= National Register of Historic Places listings in Stokes County, North Carolina =

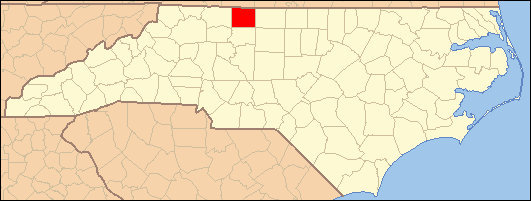

This list includes properties and districts listed on the National Register of Historic Places in Stokes County, North Carolina. Click the "Map of all coordinates" link to the right to view a Google map of all properties and districts with latitude and longitude coordinates in the table below.

== Current listings ==
This National Park Service list is complete through NPS recent listings posted March 14, 2025.

	Name on the Register	Image	Date listed	Location	City or town	Description
1	Christ Episcopal Church	Christ Episcopal Church	January 28, 2005 (#04001586)	412 Summit Ave. 36°18′00″N 80°08′22″W	Walnut Cove	
2	Danbury Historic District	Danbury Historic District	July 15, 1986 (#86001686)	Main St. between Danbury Cemetery Rd. and NC 89; 36°24′30″N 80°12′24″W	Danbury	
3	R. W. George Mill	R. W. George Mill	October 10, 1997 (#97001199)	NC 89, 0.6 mi NE of jct. of NC 89 and NC 66; 36°29′33″N 80°23′33″W	Francisco	
4	Germanton Methodist Church and Cemetery		March 19, 1998 (#98000259)	Main St., jct. of Main St. and Willow St. 36°15′39″N 80°14′00″W	Germanton	
5	Hanging Rock State Park Bathhouse	Hanging Rock State Park Bathhouse	October 24, 1991 (#91001507)	End of NC 2015 S of jct. with NC 1001, Hanging Rock State Park; 36°23′25″N 80°16′10″W	Danbury	
6	Jessup's Mill	Jessup's Mill	July 15, 1982 (#82003515)	1565 Collinstown Road; 36°31′32″N 80°22′17″W	Collinstown	
7	King Historic District	King Historic District	September 6, 2002 (#02000941)	Dalton Rd., Main St., School St. and Railroad Right of Way; 36°16′50″N 80°21′33″W	King	
8	Leak-Chaffin-Browder House		September 6, 2002 (#02000943)	NC 8, 0.1 miles S of jct. with NC 1941; 36°16′33″N 80°13′14″W	Germanton	
9	Matthew Moore House	Matthew Moore House	October 29, 1974 (#74001375)	W of Danbury; 36°26′06″N 80°17′32″W	Moores Springs	
10	Moratock Iron Furnace	Moratock Iron Furnace	July 30, 1974 (#74001376)	East of Danbury off North Carolina Highway 89; 36°24′32″N 80°11′49″W	Danbury	
11	Pine Hall	Pine Hall	July 16, 1979 (#79003350)	SR 1901 and NC 772; 36°19′40″N 80°02′31″W	Pine Hall	
12	Rock House	Rock House	October 1, 1975 (#75001292)	N of King on SR 1186; 36°24′17″N 80°21′44″W	King	
13	St. Philip's Episcopal Church	St. Philip's Episcopal Church	July 15, 1982 (#82003516)	NC 65 and 8 and SR 1957; 36°15′35″N 80°14′11″W	Germanton	
14	Stokes County Courthouse	Stokes County Courthouse	May 10, 1979 (#79001750)	Main St. between North St. and Courthouse Rd. 36°24′34″N 80°12′22″W	Danbury	
15	Walnut Cove Colored School	Walnut Cove Colored School	February 24, 1995 (#95000161)	Jct. of Brook and Dalton Sts., NW corner 36°18′12″N 80°08′39″W	Walnut Cove	

== See also ==
- National Register of Historic Places listings in North Carolina
- List of National Historic Landmarks in North Carolina
