= Pinnacle, North Carolina =

Pinnacle
- Census-designated place
- Location within the state of North Carolina
- Coordinates: 36°19′23″N 80°25′27″W
- Country: United States
- State: North Carolina
- County: Stokes
- Incorporated: 1901 (repealed 1903)

Area
  - Total: 3.63 sq mi (9.40 km^{2})
  - Land: 3.61 sq mi (9.35 km^{2})
  - Water: 0.019 sq mi (0.05 km^{2})
- Elevation: 1,034 ft (315 m)

Population (2020)
  - Total: 786
  - Density: 217.6/sq mi (84.03/km^{2})
- Time zone: UTC-5 (Eastern (EST))
  - Summer (DST): UTC-4 (EDT)
- ZIP code: 27043
- Area code: 336
- FIPS code: 37-52500
- GNIS feature ID: 2628648

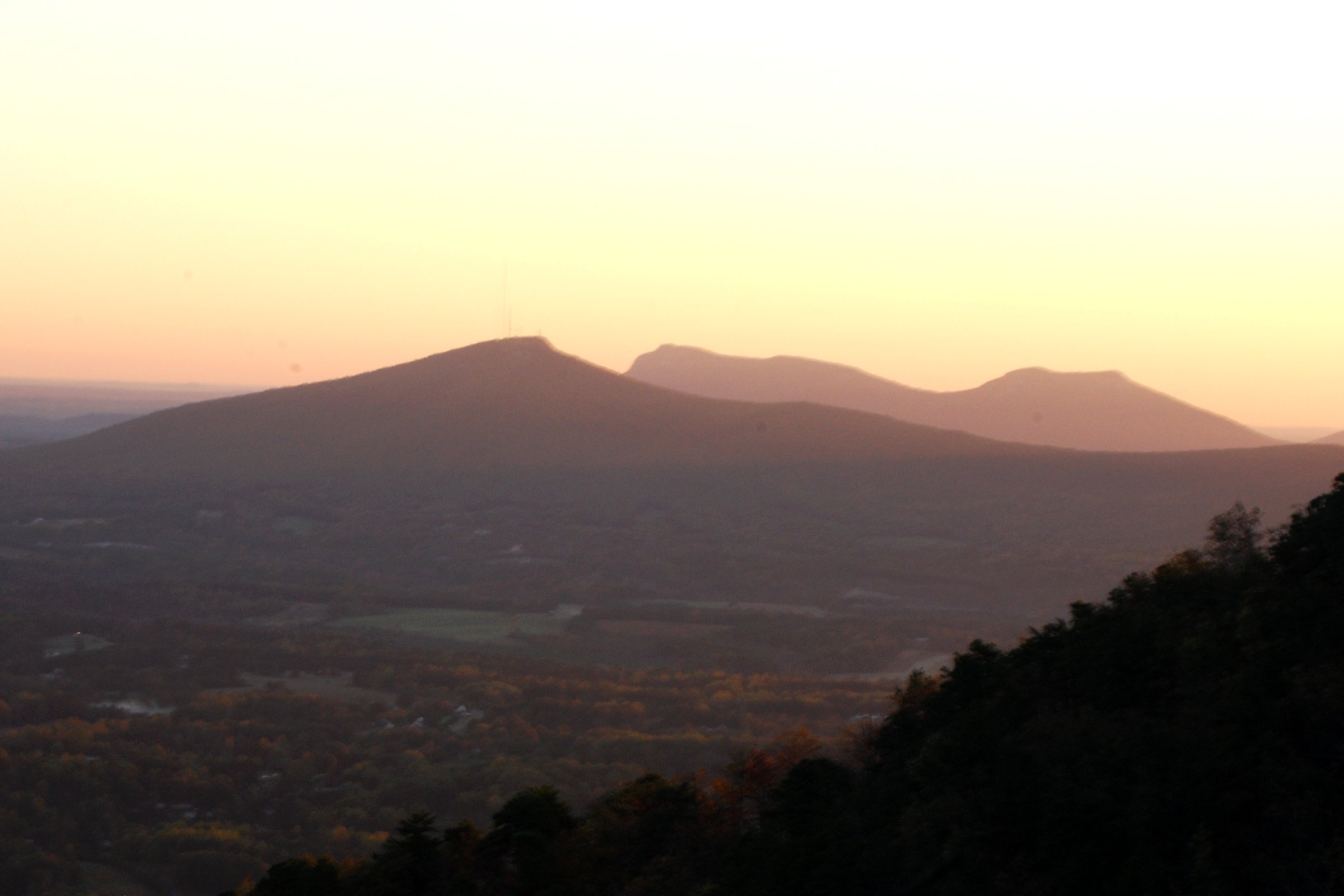
View of Pinnacle (foreground), Sauratown Mountain, and Hanging Rock State Park (background)

Pinnacle is an unincorporated community and census-designated place in southwestern Stokes County, North Carolina, United States, approximately 5 miles (8.0 km) SSE of the town of Pilot Mountain, between Pilot Mountain State Park and Hanging Rock State Park. As of the 2020 census, Pinnacle had a population of 786.

== History ==
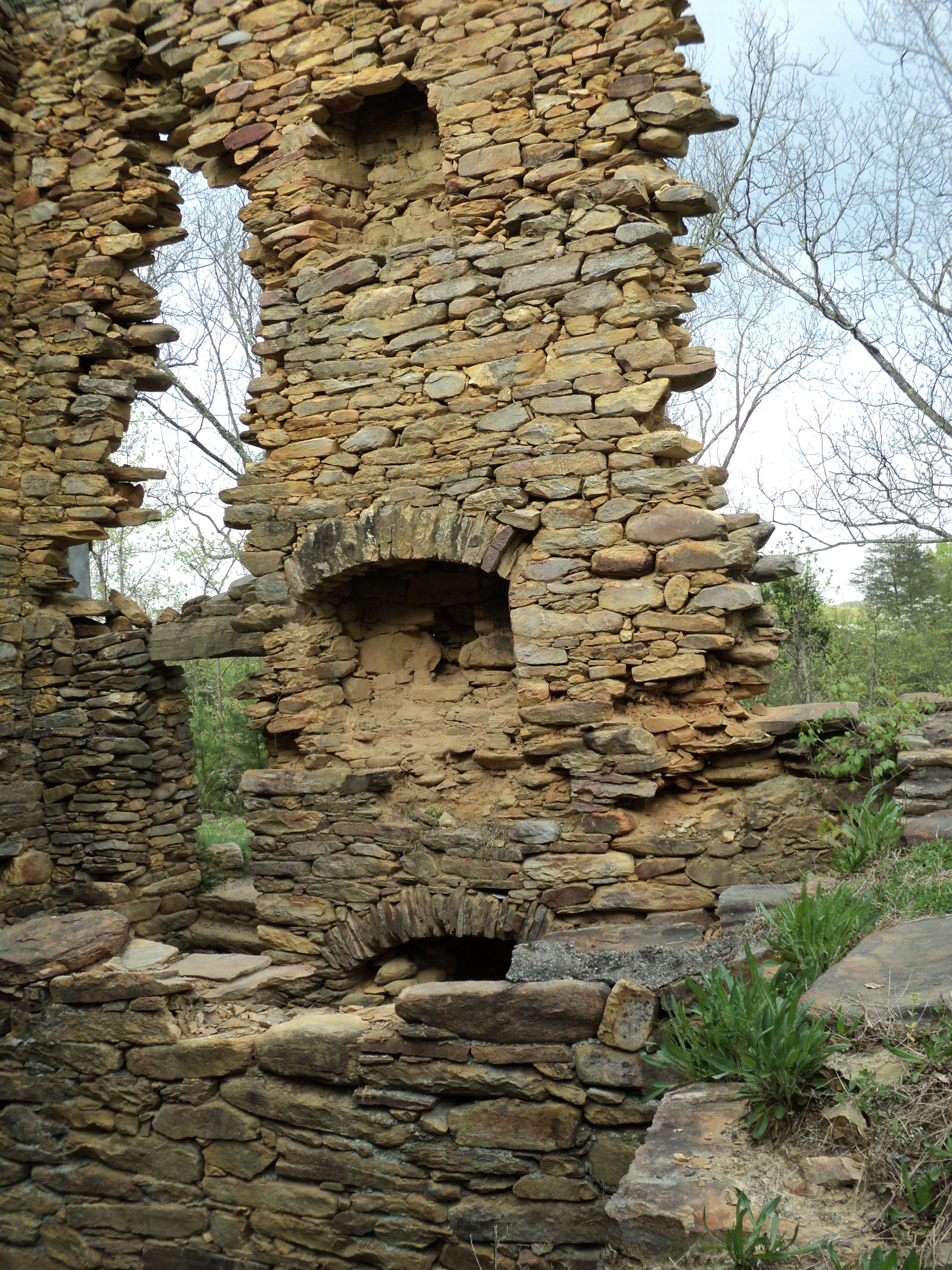
The Rock House, built by Capt. 'Jack' Martin, ca. 1770

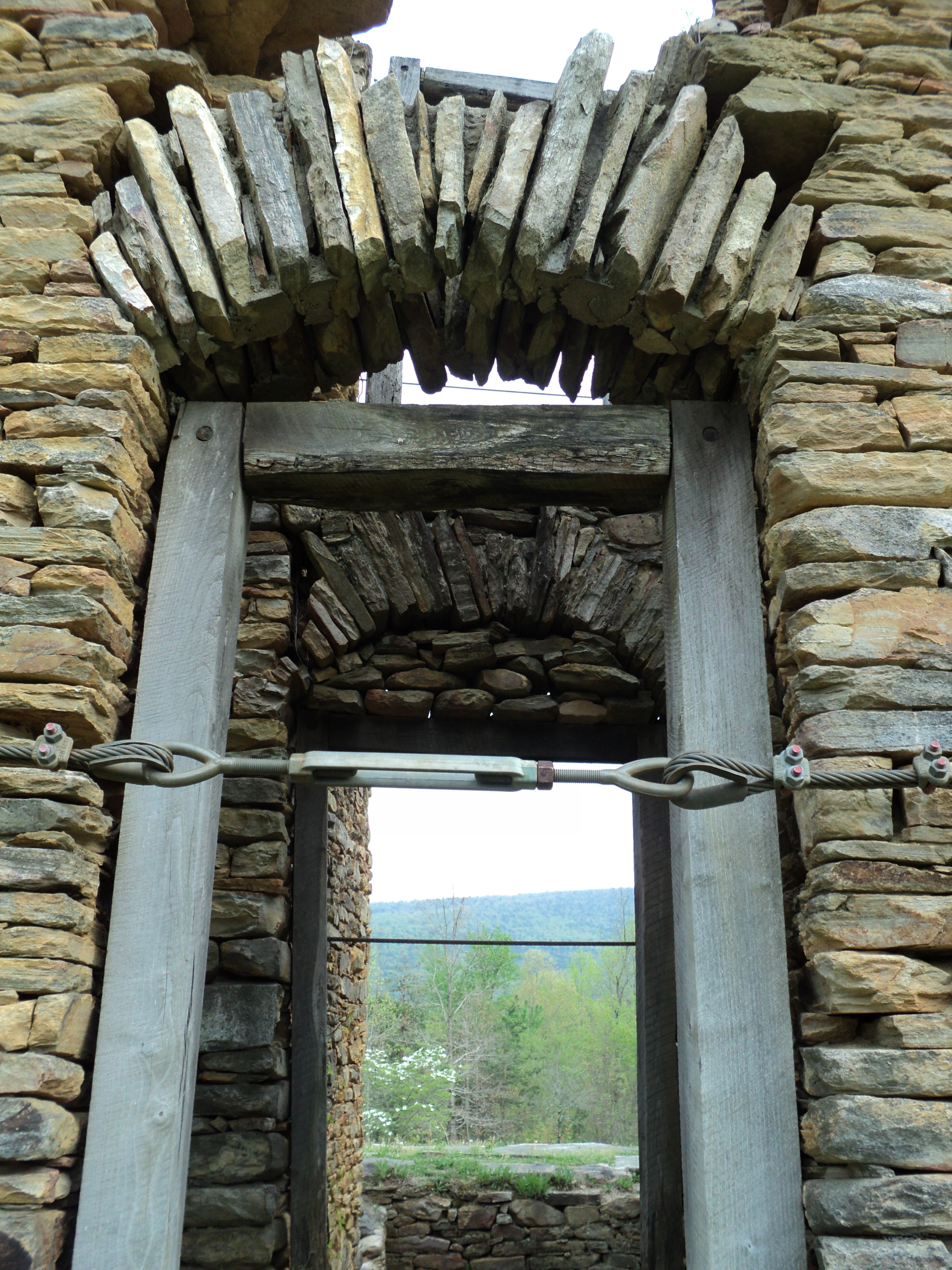
Detail of window, Rock House

The town was originally known as Culler, named for Emanuel W. Culler who owned the land on which a railroad station was built and served as the town's first mayor. The present name was adopted in 1894. Pinnacle was incorporated in 1901 but the charter was repealed in 1903.

Some 20 miles (32 km) east of Pinnacle on State Route 1186 is the Rock House, the remains of a massive four-story stone structure with three-foot-thick walls built in 1770 by Capt. John 'Jack' Martin, one of the first two settlers of Stokes County, on a 8,000-acre (32 km^{2}) grant from the Crown. Martin served in the North Carolina House of Representatives and as presiding judge of Stokes County court for over 30 years. The house was built by slaves using local flint stones, with a fireplace large enough to roast an ox and stuccoed white plaster on the exterior, and was used as a blockhouse by early settlers. Colonel Martin, who was born in Essex County, Virginia, and became a fierce fighter for the Continental cause during the Revolutionary War. Targeted by Tories during and following the War, when he was badly wounded while spying for American forces on the eve of the Battle of Kings Mountain, Martin was the brother of militia General Joseph Martin, namesake of Martinsville, Virginia. Col. Jack Martin saw action at the battles of Chestnut Ridge, Surrey County, Colsons, Old Fields, Alamance and Guilford Courthouse. The Rock House served as the mustering ground for colonial forces during the Revolutionary War as well as the War of 1812. One of the oldest structures in Stokes County and listed on the National Register of Historic Places in 1975, the house burned in 1890, and only the great rock walls remain. Rock House was acquired in 1975 by the Stokes County Historical Society, which has struggled recently to protect the ruins from vandals.

In addition to the Rock House, the Hauser Farm was listed on the National Register of Historic Places in 2002.

== Demographics ==
Historical population
Census	Pop.	Note	%±
2020	786		—
U.S. Decennial Census
