= Walnut Cove, North Carolina =

- Town
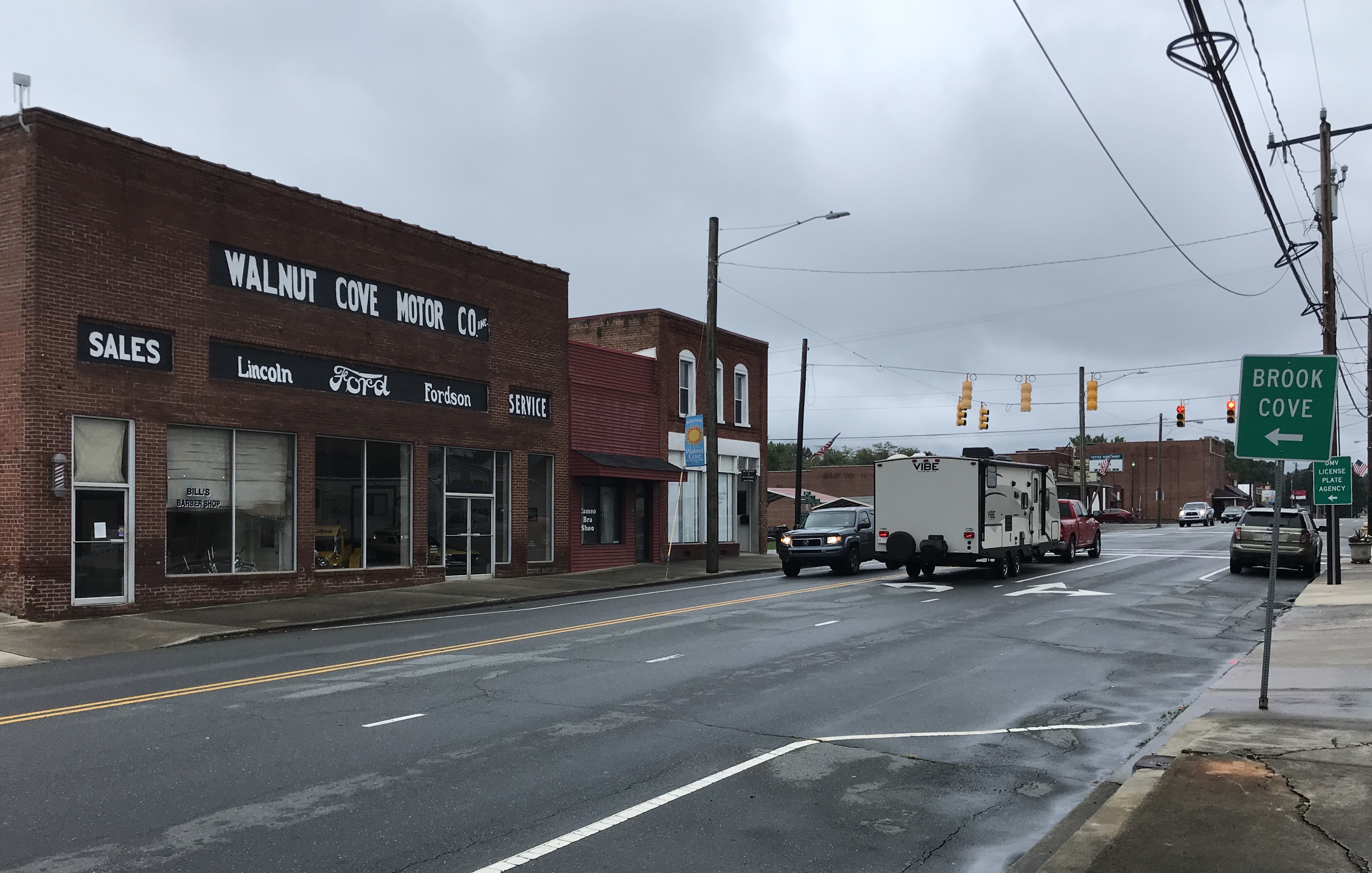
- North Main Street in Walnut Cove
- Nickname: The Cove
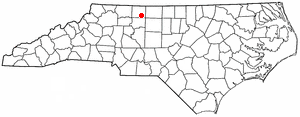
- Location of Walnut Cove, North Carolina
- Coordinates: 36°17′38″N 80°08′27″W
- Country: United States
- State: North Carolina
- County: Stokes
- Founded: 1883
- Incorporated: 1889
- Named for: A grove of walnut trees

Government
  - Type: Mayor-Council
  - Mayor: Nellie Brown

Area
  - Total: 2.56 sq mi (6.62 km^{2})
  - Land: 2.52 sq mi (6.53 km^{2})
  - Water: 0.035 sq mi (0.09 km^{2})
- Elevation: 646 ft (197 m)

Population (2020)
  - Total: 1,586
  - Density: 628.8/sq mi (242.78/km^{2})
- Time zone: UTC-5 (Eastern (EST))
  - Summer (DST): UTC-4 (EDT)
- ZIP code: 27052
- Area code: 336
- FIPS code: 37-70780
- GNIS feature ID: 2406826
- Website: www.townofwalnutcove.org

Walnut Cove is a town in Stokes County, North Carolina, United States. The population was 1,536 at the 2020 census.

It is the home of the Walnut Cove Springfest, which draws many visitors to the area. Festival-organizers marked 1889, the town's incorporation date, but the town's roots date to the mid-18th century when it was known as Town Fork. Town Fork settlers formed a bond with Moravians in Bethania and Bethabara. Eventually, William Lash, a Moravian settler at Bethania, bought land along the Town Fork Creek, which later developed into a large plantation named Walnut Cove. The Town was a railroad center in its former years, and today remnants of the old Train Depot still stand on Depot Street.

It is also home to historic Covington House (built in 1821), Fulp-Marshall Home (built in 1836), Culler Roller Mill now known as Monitor Roller Mill (built in 1900).

Walnut Cove is also home to South Stokes High School, a big part of the town is located to the west of town, near NC 8 and Hawkins Road. Belews Lake and Hanging Rock State Park are located nearby. Winston-Salem is 23 miles (37 km) to the southeast via US 311, US 158 and Salem Parkway (US 421). Danbury is 10 miles (16 km) to the north via NC 89. Germanton is 6.6 miles to the west-southwest via NC 65. Madison and Mayodan are 14 miles (23 km) to the northeast via US 311. Other nearby cities include Kernersville, Walkertown, Rural Hall, Stokesdale, and the small community of Pine Hall.

== History ==
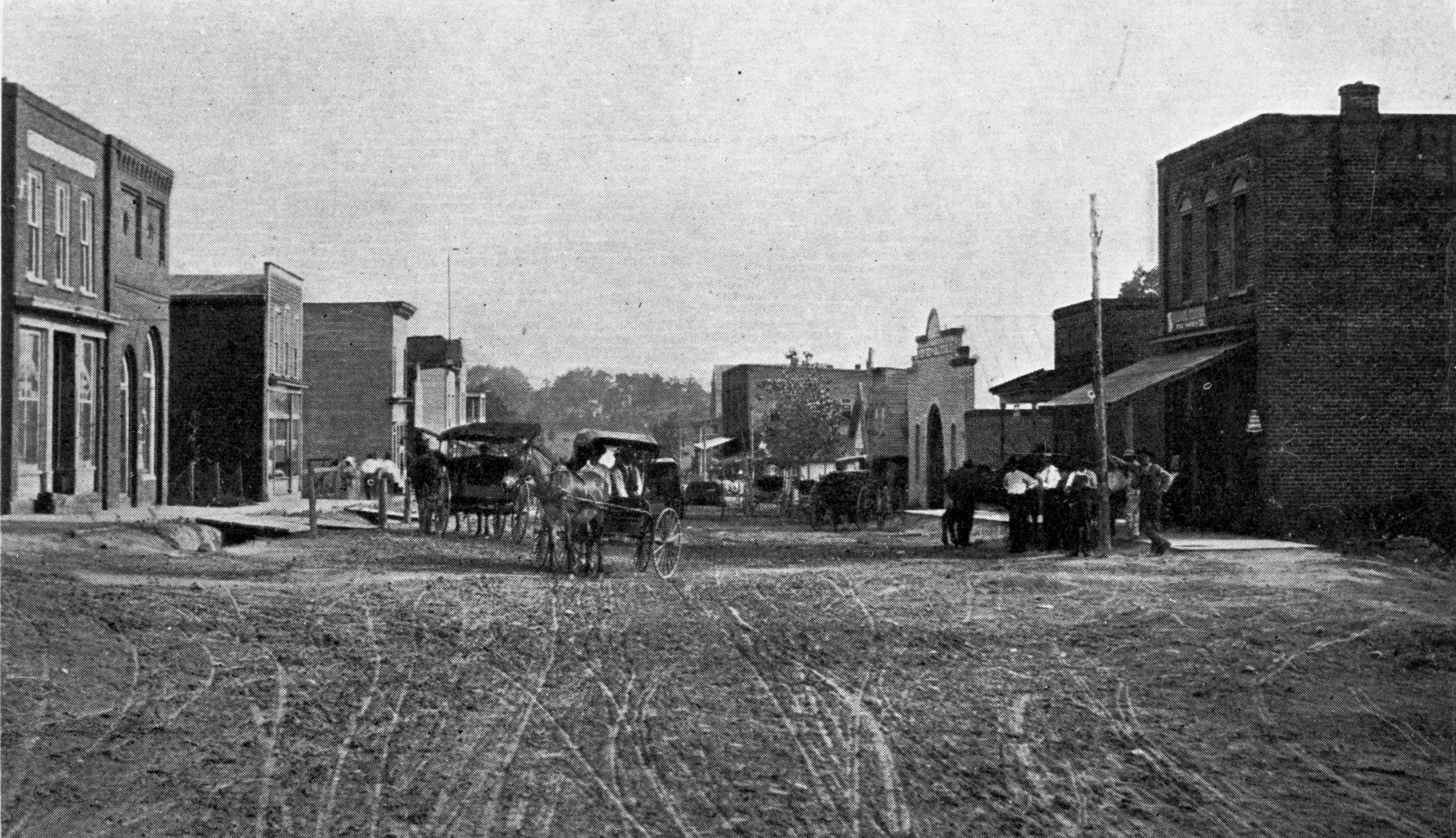
Main Street, 1900s

The Christ Episcopal Church and Walnut Cove Colored School are listed on the National Register of Historic Places.

Burt Myers, a race car driver for NASCAR Whelen Southern Modified Tour is from Walnut Cove.

American country music artist Joe Nichols lived in Walnut Cove, attending South Stokes High School.

== Geography ==
According to the United States Census Bureau, the town has a total area of 2.4 square miles (6.2 km^{2}), all of it land.

== Demographics ==
Historical population
Census	Pop.	Note	%±
1890	320		—
1900	336		5.0%
1910	480		42.9%
1920	651		35.6%
1930	1,081		66.1%
1940	1,084		0.3%
1950	1,132		4.4%
1960	1,288		13.8%
1970	1,213		−5.8%
1980	1,147		−5.4%
1990	1,088		−5.1%
2000	1,465		34.7%
2010	1,425		−2.7%
2020	1,586		11.3%
2021 (est.)	1,532	▼	−3.4%
U.S. Decennial Census

=== 2020 census ===
Walnut Cove racial composition
Race	Number	Percentage
White (non-Hispanic)	1,083	68.28%
Black or African American (non-Hispanic)	358	22.57%
Native American	9	0.57%
Asian	3	0.19%
Pacific Islander	1	0.06%
Other/Mixed	85	5.36%
Hispanic or Latino	47	2.96%

As of the 2020 United States census, there were 1,586 people, 802 households, and 493 families residing in the town.

=== 2000 census ===
As of the census of 2000, there were 1,465 people, 585 households, and 374 families residing in the town. The population density was 608.5 inhabitants per square mile (234.9/km^{2}). There were 636 housing units at an average density of 264.2 per square mile (102.0/km^{2}). The racial makeup of the town was 79.39% White, 19.11% African American, 0.14% Native American, 0.14% Asian, 0.34% from other races, and 0.89% from two or more races. Hispanic or Latino of any race were 0.96% of the population.

There were 585 households, out of which 26.7% had children under the age of 18 living with them, 46.2% were married couples living together, 15.6% had a female householder with no husband present, and 35.9% were non-families. 32.6% of all households were made up of individuals, and 15.9% had someone living alone who was 65 years of age or older. The average household size was 2.24 and the average family size was 2.83.

In the town, the population was spread out, with 19.5% under the age of 18, 6.3% from 18 to 24, 24.6% from 25 to 44, 22.8% from 45 to 64, and 26.8% who were 65 years of age or older. The median age was 45 years. For every 100 females, there were 80.0 males. For every 100 females age 18 and over, there were 73.1 males.

The median income for a household in the town was $31,944, and the median income for a family was $41,250. Males had a median income of $31,953 versus $24,871 for females. The per capita income for the town was $16,117. About 8.3% of families and 12.5% of the population were below the poverty line, including 10.0% of those under age 18 and 17.8% of those age 65 or over.
