= Rodenbough =

Surname

Rodenbough is a surname. Notable people with the surname include:

- Grace Taylor Rodenbough, American politician
- Libby Rodenbough, American fiddle player and member of the band Mipso
- MK Rodenbough, American guitarist and member of the band Bombadil
- Theophilus Francis Rodenbough, American military officer
