= Danbury Historic District =

Historic district in North Carolina, United States

- U.S. National Register of Historic Places
- U.S. Historic district
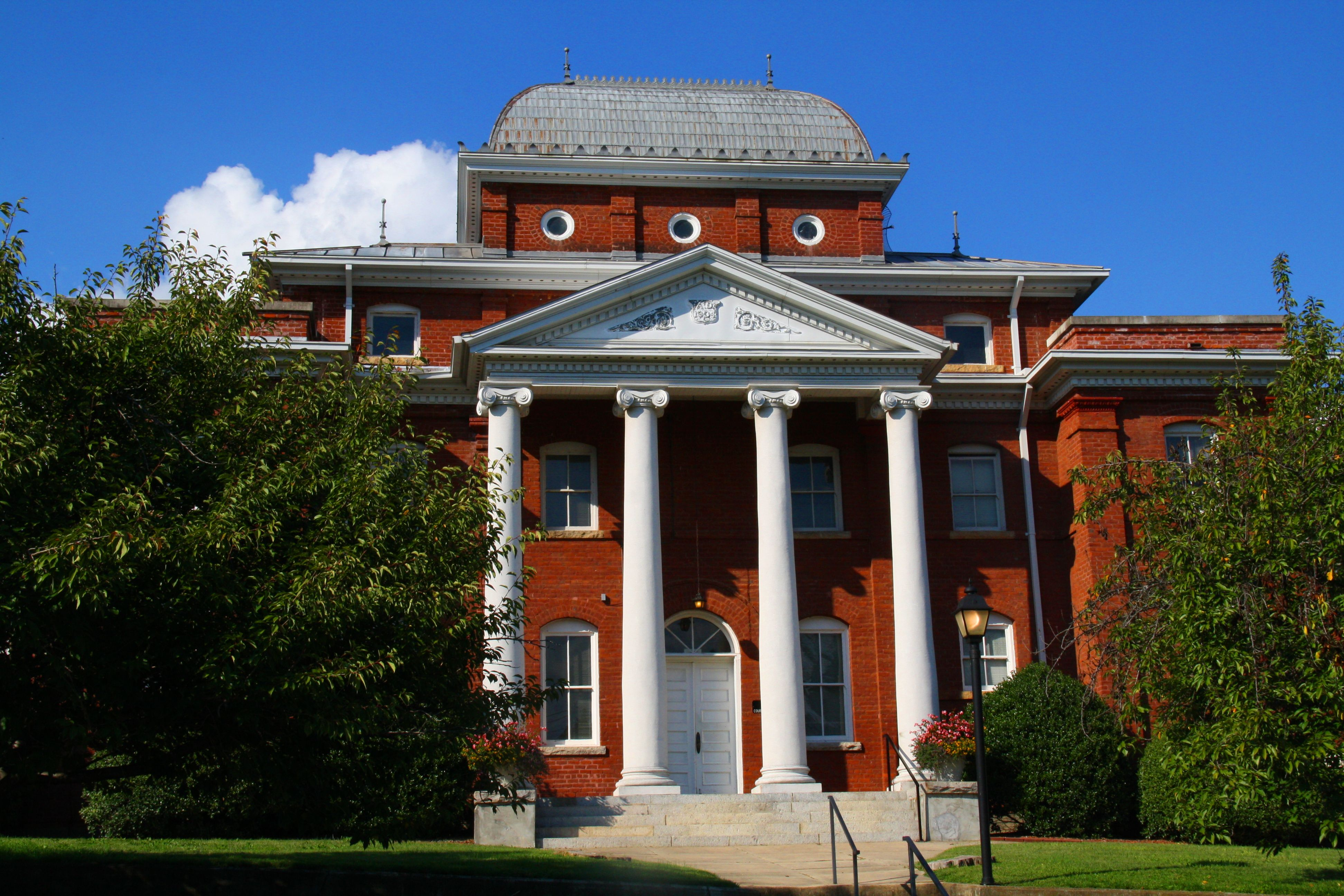
- Old Stokes County Courthouse, September 2014

- Location within North Carolina Location within the United States
- Location: Main St. between Danbury Cemetery Rd. and NC 89, Danbury, North Carolina
- Coordinates: 36°24′30″N 80°12′24″W
- Area: 88 acres (36 ha)
- Built: 1860
- Architect: Pepper, N.M.; Et al.
- Architectural style: Queen Anne, Romanesque, Bungalow
- NRHP reference No.: 86001686
- Added to NRHP: July 15, 1986

Danbury Historic District is a national historic district located at Danbury, Stokes County, North Carolina. The district encompasses 44 contributing buildings in the central business district and surrounding residential section of Danbury. They were built between about 1860 and 1930 and include notable examples of Queen Anne, Romanesque Revival, and Bungalow architecture. Located in the district and separately listed is the Stokes County Courthouse. Other notable buildings include the County Jail (1904), Petree Store, the Martin Store, Stack-Bickett Law office (1888), Bank of Stokes County (c. 1910), McCannless Hotel (c. 1860s), James Pepper House (c. 1860), Wilson Fulton brick house (c. 1860), Samuel H. Taylor House/Hotel, the N. E. Wall House (c. 1921), Baptist Mission Church, Clark Memorial Presbyterian Church (c. 1893), and the Methodist Church.

It was added to the National Register of Historic Places in 1986.
