= Horne Creek Living Historical Farm =

Historic farm in North Carolina, United States

- Hauser Farmhouse
- U.S. National Register of Historic Places
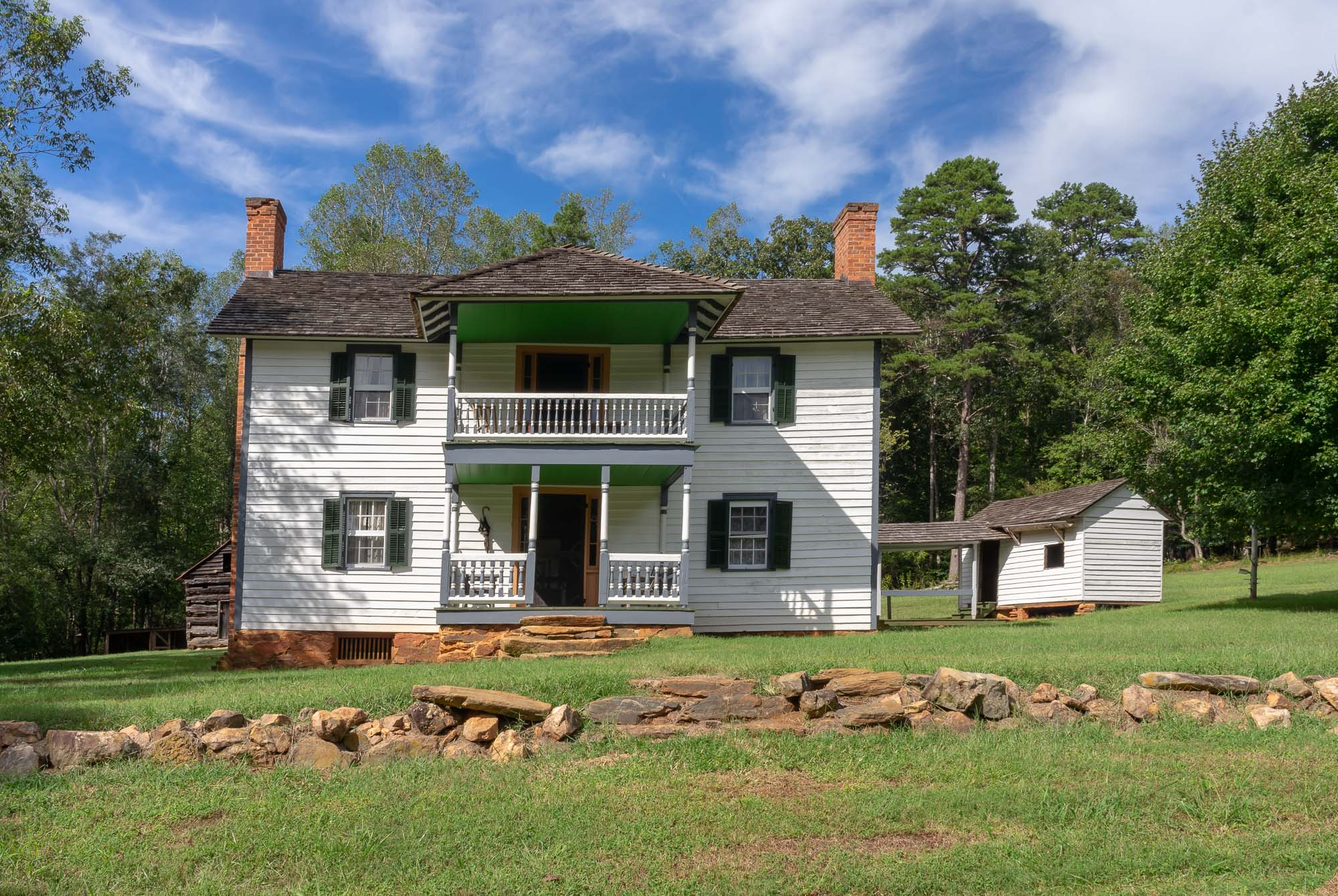
- Hauser Farmhouse with washhouse

- Location within North Carolina Location within the United States
- Location: 308 Horne Creek Farm Rd.
- Nearest city: Pinnacle, North Carolina
- Coordinates: 36.2659°N 80.4861°W
- Area: 20 acres (8.1 ha)
- Built: 1880
- Built by: John & Thomas Hauser
- Architectural style: Log house
- Website: https://historicsites.nc.gov/all-sites/horne-creek-farm
- NRHP reference No.: 02000113
- Added to NRHP: March 1, 2002

Horne Creek Farm is a historical farm near Pinnacle, Surry County, North Carolina. The farm is a North Carolina State Historic Site that belongs to the North Carolina Department of Natural and Cultural Resources, and it is operated to depict farm life in the northwest Piedmont area c. 1900. The historic site includes the late 19th century Hauser Farmhouse, which has been furnished to reflect the 1900-1910 era, along with other supporting structures. The farm raised animal breeds that were common in the early 20th century. The site also includes the Southern Heritage Apple Orchard, which preserves about 800 trees of about 400 heritage apple varieties. A visitor center includes exhibits, a gift shop and offices.

The State Historic Site regularly hosts special events, which focus on farm life and techniques from the early 20th century, and include sheep shearing, corn shucking, ice cream socials, heritage crafts, music and pie baking.

The farmhouse was built about 1880, and is a two-story, three-bay, single-pile log building with weatherboard sheathing and a wood-shingled gable roof. Also on the property are the contributing double-crib log barn (c. 1846), wellhouse/washhouse (c. 1880), log smokehouse (c. 1880), log tobacco barn (c. 1910), corncrib (c. 1930), a fruit house (c. 1900) and family cemetery (c. 1853). A reconstructed fruit and vegetable drying house was placed where the original once stood.

Circa 1970, the State of North Carolina acquired the Hauser farm lands as part of the River section of Pilot Mountain State Park. It considered including the farm as part of the state park. Instead, the homestead was transferred to the State Historic Site system, while much of the farm land remains in the state park.

It was listed on the National Register of Historic Places in 2002.

== See also ==
- Open-air museum
