= Grace Taylor Rodenbough =

American politician and educator

Member of the North Carolina House of Representatives
- In office 1953–1966

Personal details
- Born: Grace Pemberton Taylor; October 5, 1897 Danbury, North Carolina, U.S.
- Died: January 8, 1967 (aged 69) Winston-Salem, North Carolina, U.S.
- Party: Democratic Party
- Spouse(s): Rex Exum Stuart (1929–1936; divorced); Stanley Leigh Rodenbough Jr. (1947–1967; her death)
- Education: Guilford College (AB); UNC Greensboro (MEd)

Grace Pemberton Taylor Rodenbough (October 5, 1897 – January 8, 1967) was an American educator and politician. She was elected to the North Carolina House of Representatives in 1953 and was the first woman from Stokes County to serve in a state office.

== Early life and education ==
Rodenbough was born Grace Pemberton Taylor on October 5, 1897 in Danbury, North Carolina to James Spotswood Taylor, a wealthy tobacco farmer, and Nellie Pemberton Moon, a Quaker and daughter of the evangelist and missionary Mary Moon Meredith. Her father was the second-largest grower of fluecured tobacco in the world. She spent her summers at the Piedmont Springs Hotel, a mineral resort owned by her parents. Two of her brothers, Ed and John, were members of the North Carolina General Assembly. Rodenbough was raised in both her mother's Quaker faith and her father's Methodist faith.

She was educated in public schools. She graduated from Guilford College with an bachelor of arts degree in 1917. She earned a masters degree in education from the University of North Carolina at Greensboro in 1952. She was a member of Delta Kappa Gamma.

== Career ==
Following graduating from Guilford College, Rodenbough worked as a teacher in Stokes County and Rockingham County. She moved to Winston-Salem in 1929 and was employed as a history and government teacher at Salem College. She served as president of the North Carolina Education Association chapter in Stokes County from 1939 to 1940.

During World War II, she served as chairwoman of the War Savings Bonds committee and as the Stokes County Red Cross. In 1943, she was appointed the head of the county's recruiting campaign for the Women's Army Corps by Governor J. Melville Broughton. That same year, Rodenbough became a trustee of the University of North Carolina as the first trustee from Stokes County. In 1948, she was appointed schools supervisor for Stokes County.

=== Politics ===
Rodenbough was active in politics as a member of the Democratic Party. From 1936 to 1937, she served as president of a county chapter of the Young Democrats of America and the following year served as the state society's president.

In 1952, Rodenbough successfully ran for a seat in the North Carolina House of Representatives. She took office in 1953 as the first woman from Stokes County to serve in a state office, the only woman of the legislature at that time, and the eleventh woman ever to sit in the legislature. She served as a state representative for thirteen years. During this time, she served as a delegate to the Democratic National Convention and became the first woman to serve as vice-chair of the House Finance Committee. In 1953, Governor William B. Umstead appointed Rodenbough to the commission on higher education, where she introduced a bill to create the State Board of Higher Education. In 1956, she served on a special subcommittee that considered racial integration in schools. In 1960, she was one of three incumbent women representatives that were reelcted to the general assembly. During her last term in office, in 1965, she served as chairwoman of the Committee on the Statues of Women. She focused on education and agriculture and was a supporter of Governors William B. Umstead, Luther H. Hodges, and Terry Sanford. She initially supported L. Richardson Preyer in the 1964 gubernatorial election but later endorsed Dan K. Moore.

== Personal life ==
On November 12, 1929, she married Rex Exum Stuart and divorced him on November 24, 1936. She married a second time, to Stanley Leigh Rodenbough Jr., on August 4, 1947. They purchased and restored the Covington House near Walnut Cove. Upon her second marriage, she converted to Presbyterianism.

Rodenbough was active in civic endeavors and was a member of the Daughters of the American Revolution, the United Daughters of the Confederacy, North Carolina Literary and Historical Association, North Carolina Society for the Preservation of Antiquities, and the American Association of University Women.

She died on January 8, 1967 at the Baptist Hospital in Winston-Salem.
