= Tory's Falls (Hanging Rock) =

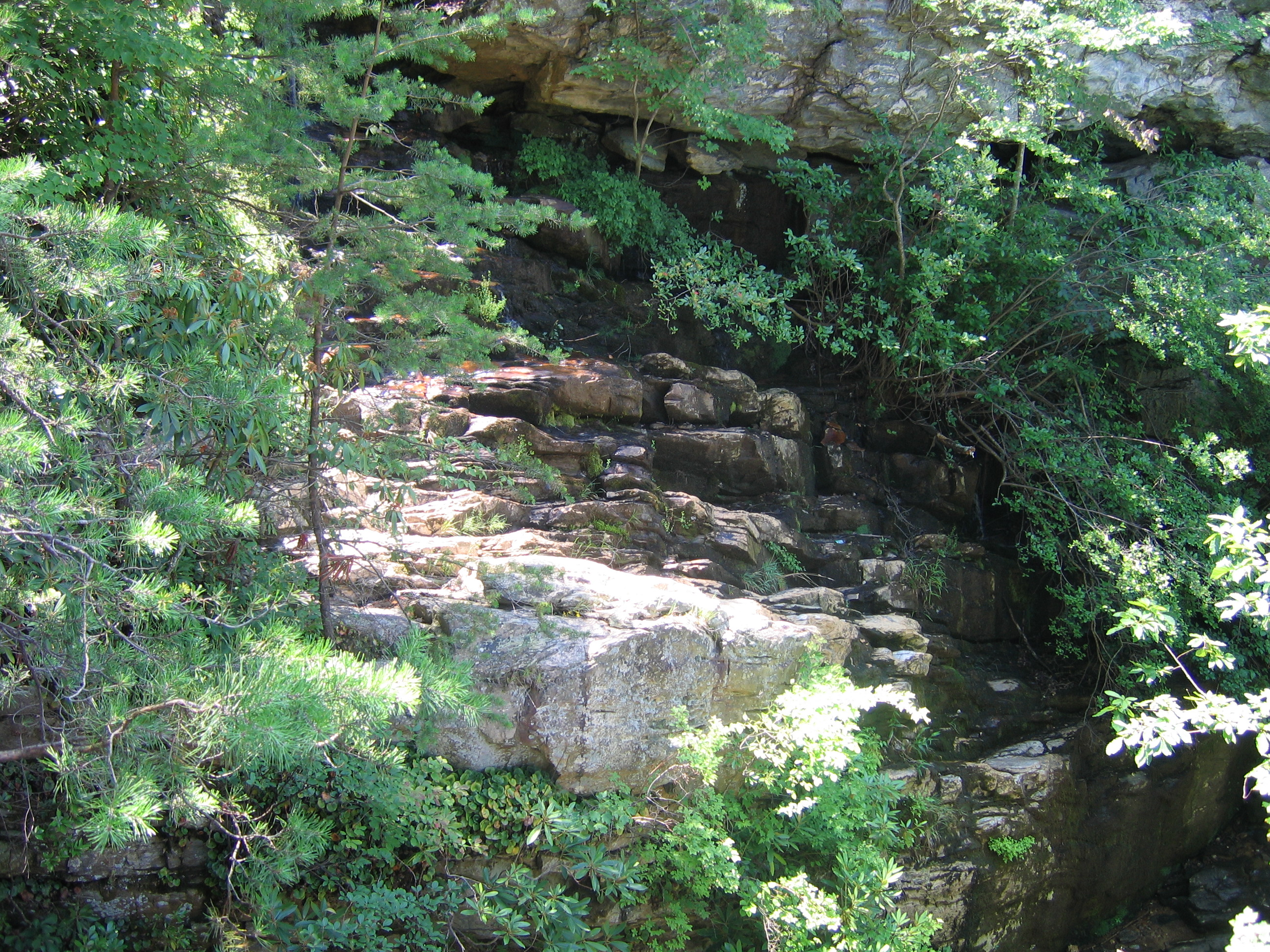
- Interactive map of Tory's Falls
- Location: Hanging Rock State Park, Stokes County, North Carolina
- Coordinates: 36°24′05″N 80°17′53″W
- Type: Cascade
- Total height: 100 ft (30 m)
- Number of drops: 1, with cascades

Tory's Falls, also called Tory Falls and Torys Falls is a waterfall in North Central North Carolina, located in Hanging Rock State Park in Stokes County.

== History ==
The falls are located near an area called "Tory's Den", a cave that was purportedly used by Tories during the American Revolution.

== Visiting the falls ==
The falls are open to the public and are accessible beginning at a parking area on the side of Charlie Young Road. Visitors may take a moderate-difficulty 300 yard (275m) trail to the falls. It is difficult to see the entire falls from any one location, and the water source occasionally dries up to a trickle.

== Nearby falls ==
Hanging Rock State Park hosts four other waterfalls:

- Lower Cascades
- Upper Cascades
- Window Falls
- Hidden Falls

== See also ==
- List of waterfalls
- List of waterfalls in North Carolina
