= Upper Cascades (Hanging Rock) =

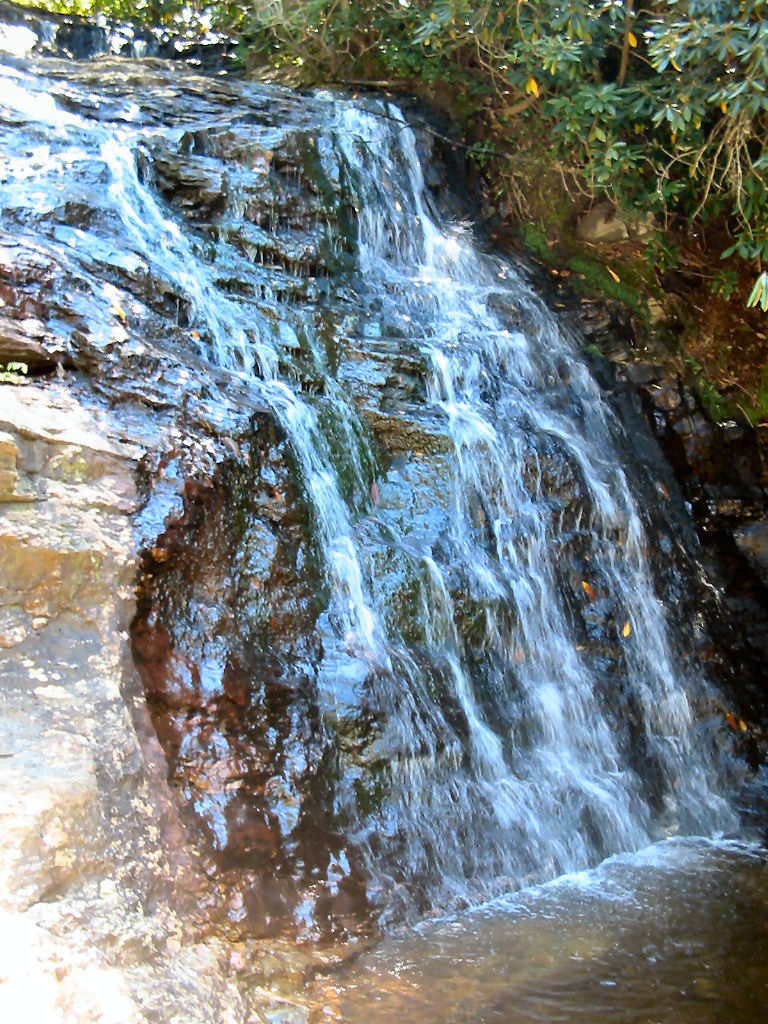
- Upper Cascades, September 2005
- Interactive map of Upper Cascades
- Location: Hanging Rock State Park, Stokes County, North Carolina
- Coordinates: 36.396177°N 80.269823°W
- Type: Cascade
- Total height: 25 ft (8 m)
- Number of drops: 1

Upper Cascades is a waterfall in North Central North Carolina, located in Hanging Rock State Park, in Stokes County.

== Geology ==
The waterway is Cascades Creek, which flows through Hanging Rock State Park. The falls flow over a steep cascade before continuing down Cascades Creek to Lower Cascades.

== Visiting the Falls ==
The falls are open to the public and are accessible from the visitor center at Hanging Rock State Park. Visitors may take a 0.3-mile (0.5 km) trail to the falls. There is a wooden observation deck with a view of the falls, as well as wooden steps which lead to the base of the falls.

== Nearby falls ==
Hanging Rock State Park hosts four other waterfalls:

- Tory's Falls
- Lower Cascades
- Window Falls
- Hidden Falls

== See also ==
- List of waterfalls
- List of waterfalls in North Carolina
