= Hidden Falls (Hanging Rock, North Carolina) =

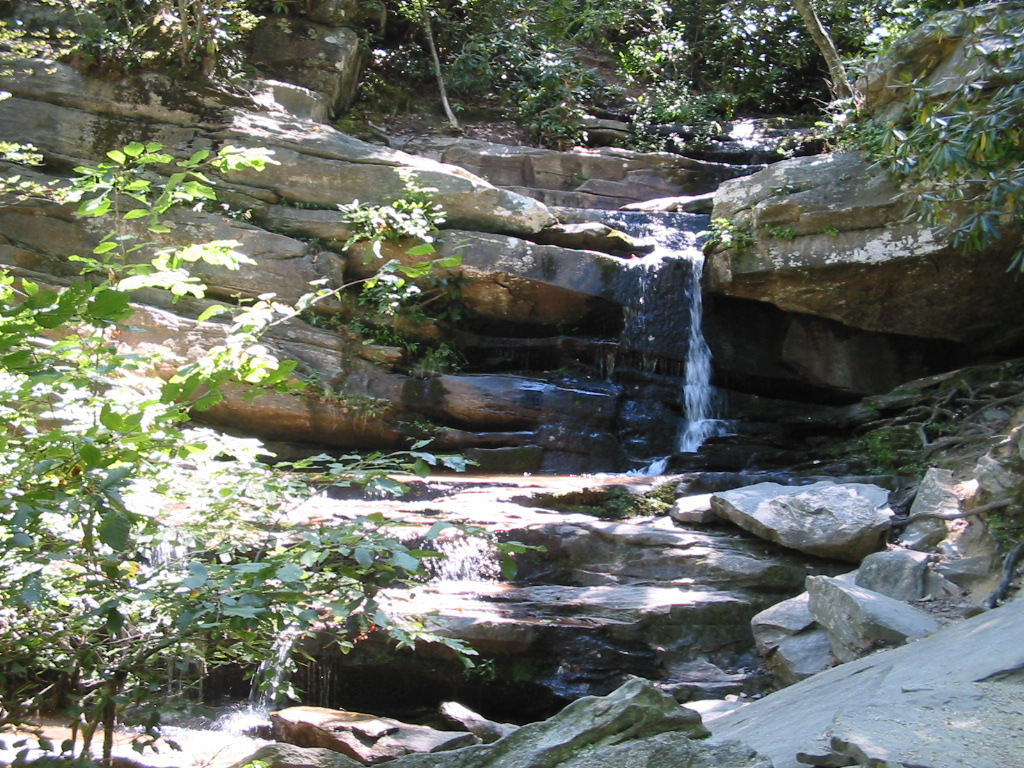
- Hidden Falls, September 2005
- Interactive map of Hidden Falls
- Location: Hanging Rock State Park, Stokes County, North Carolina
- Coordinates: 36.398899°N 80.260332°W
- Type: Cascade
- Total height: 13 ft (4.0 m)
- Number of drops: 3

Hidden Falls is a waterfall in the U.S. state of North Carolina, located in Hanging Rock State Park in Stokes County.

== Geology ==
The waterway is Indian Creek, which flows through Hanging Rock State Park, which continues down to Window Falls.

== Visiting the Falls ==
The falls are open to the public and are accessible beginning at a parking area on the side of Hall Road. Visitors may take a moderate-difficulty 0.5-mile (.9 km) trail to the falls. Visitors may continue past Hidden Falls' viewing area for .1 miles to view Window Falls.

== Nearby falls ==
Hanging Rock State Park hosts four other waterfalls:

- Tory's Falls
- Lower Cascades
- Upper Cascades
- Window Falls

== See also ==
- List of waterfalls
- List of waterfalls in North Carolina
