= Window Falls (Hanging Rock) =

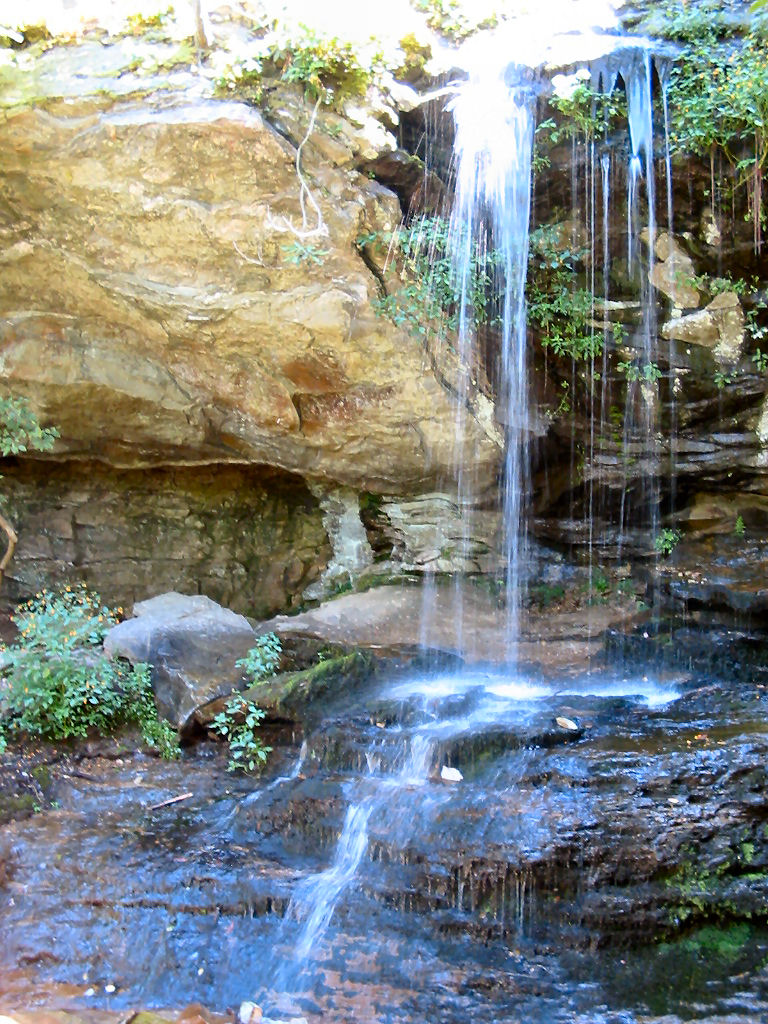
- Window Falls, September 2005
- Interactive map of Window Falls
- Location: Hanging Rock State Park, Stokes County, North Carolina
- Coordinates: 36.400918°N 80.259479°W
- Type: Plunge, Cascade
- Total height: 27 ft (8.2 m)
- Number of drops: 2

Window Falls is a waterfall in North Central North Carolina, located in Hanging Rock State Park in Stokes County.

== Geology ==
The subject watercourse is Indian Creek, which flows through Hanging Rock State Park. The falls is situated adjacent to a rock formation that has a small aperture that visitors can peer through, giving the falls its name.

== Visiting the Falls ==
The falls are open to the public and are accessible beginning at a parking area on the side of Hall Road. Visitors may take a moderate-difficulty 0.6-mile (1 km) trail to the falls. Visitors will pass the viewing area for Hidden Falls along the way.

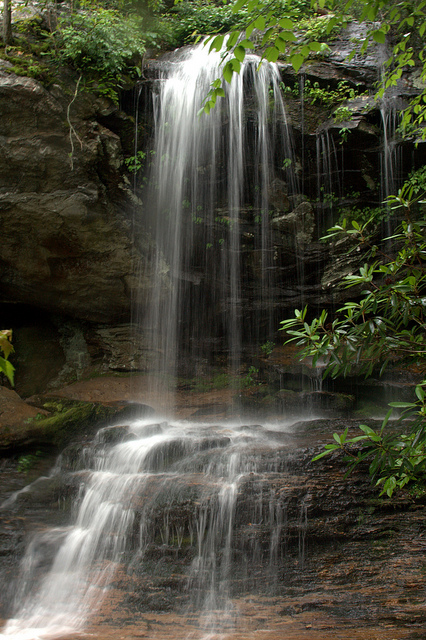
Window Falls in Hanging Rock State Park

== Nearby falls ==
Unlisted on park maps is a small, unnamed, 15 ft. (4 m.) high waterfall directly above Window Falls.

Hanging Rock State Park hosts four other waterfalls:

- Tory's Falls
- Lower Cascades
- Upper Cascades
- Hidden Falls

== See also ==
- List of waterfalls
- List of waterfalls in North Carolina
