= Lower Cascades (Hanging Rock) =

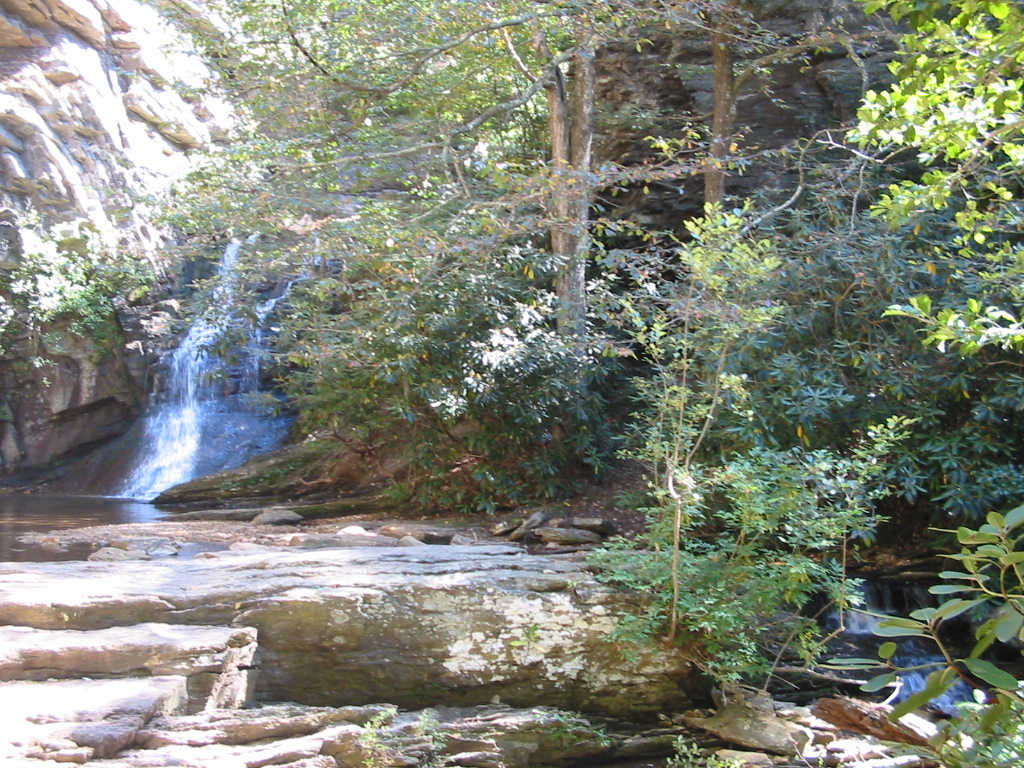
- Lower Cascades, September 2005
- Interactive map of Lower Cascades
- Location: Hanging Rock State Park, Stokes County, North Carolina
- Coordinates: 36.414907°N 80.268480°W
- Type: Cascade
- Total height: 35 ft (11 m)
- Number of drops: 1

Lower Cascades is a waterfall in North Central North Carolina, located in Hanging Rock State Park in Stokes County.

== History ==
The falls were first seen by Europeans when they were discovered by German naturalist Lewis David von Schweinitz. They were originally named Schweinitz Falls (or Cascades).

== Geology ==
The waterway is Cascades Creek, which flows through Hanging Rock State Park. The falls have a large plunge pool at the base with an overhanging bluff.

== Visiting the Falls ==
The falls are open to the public and are accessible beginning at a parking area on the side of Hall Road. Visitors may take a moderate-difficulty 0.3-mile (.5 km) trail to the falls. The trail used to be extremely difficult at the end with a dangerous cliff scramble, but has been made much easier by the addition of a set of stairs to the plunge pool.

== Nearby falls ==
Hanging Rock State Park hosts four other waterfalls:

- Tory's Falls
- Upper Cascades
- Window Falls
- Hidden Falls

== See also ==
- List of waterfalls
- List of waterfalls in North Carolina
