= Christ Episcopal Church (Walnut Cove, North Carolina) =

Historic church in North Carolina, United States

- U.S. National Register of Historic Places
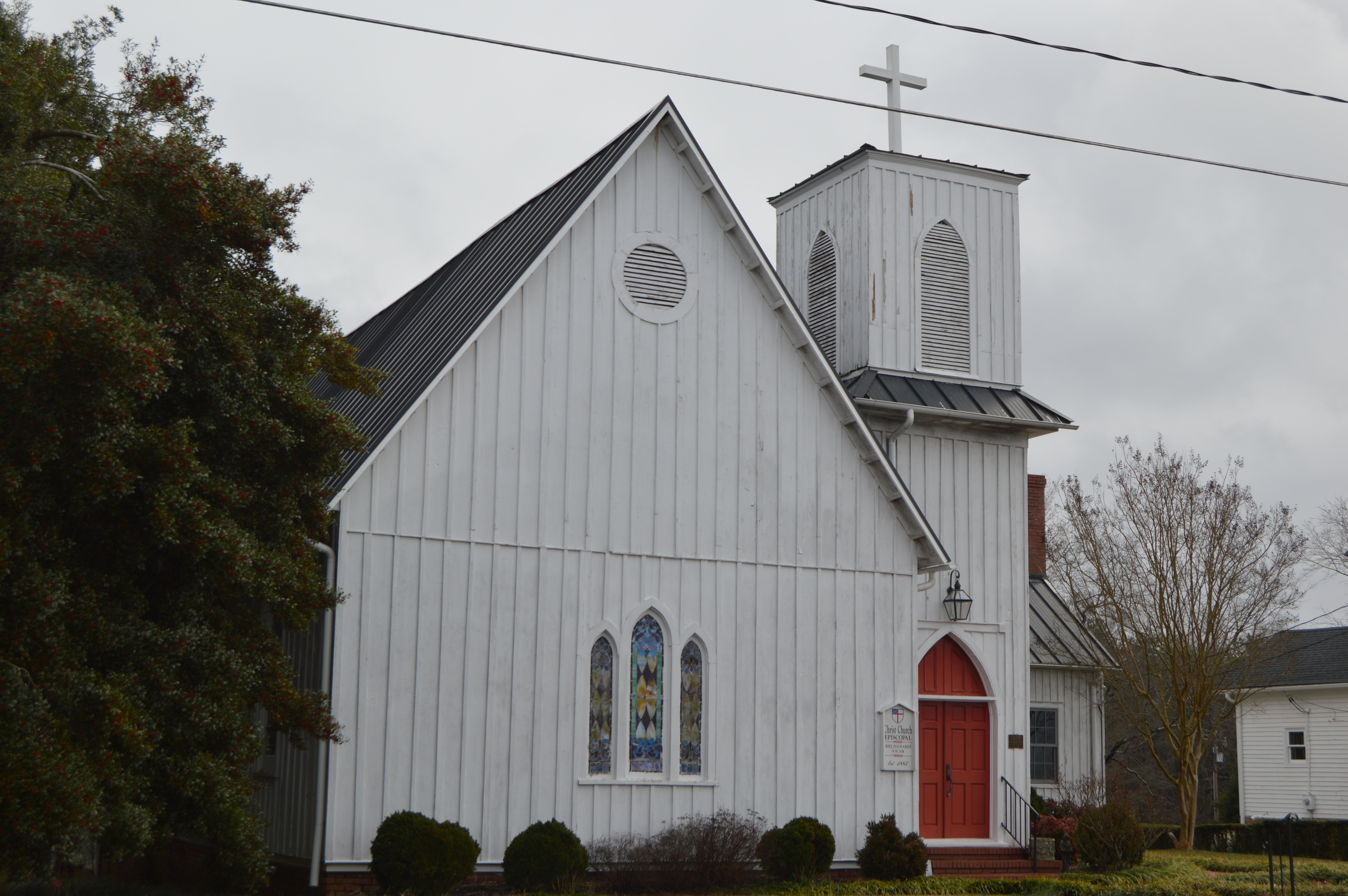
- Facade

- Location within North Carolina Location within the United States
- Location: 412 Summit Ave., Walnut Cove, North Carolina
- Coordinates: 36°17′59″N 80°8′22″W
- Area: 1 acre (0.40 ha)
- Built: 1886-1887, 1909
- Architectural style: Gothic Revival
- NRHP reference No.: 04001586
- Added to NRHP: January 28, 2005

Christ Episcopal Church is a historic Episcopal church located at 412 Summit Avenue in Walnut Cove, Stokes County, North Carolina. It was built in 1886–1887, and is a one-story, Gothic Revival style board-and-batten frame building. It was moved to its present located in 1909. It features lancet-arched windows and a two-stage entrance tower and belfry. An addition was built in 1943.

It was added to the National Register of Historic Places in 2005.
