= Collinstown, North Carolina =

Collinstown
- Unincorporated community
- Location within the state of North Carolina
- Coordinates: 36°32′43″N 80°20′13″W
- Country: United States
- State: North Carolina
- County: Stokes
- Time zone: UTC-5 (Eastern (EST))
  - Summer (DST): UTC-4 (EDT)
- ZIP code: 27053

Collinstown is an unincorporated community in Stokes County, North Carolina, United States.

Jessup's Mill was listed on the National Register of Historic Places in 1982.
