= Moratock Park =

- Moratock Iron Furnace
- U.S. National Register of Historic Places
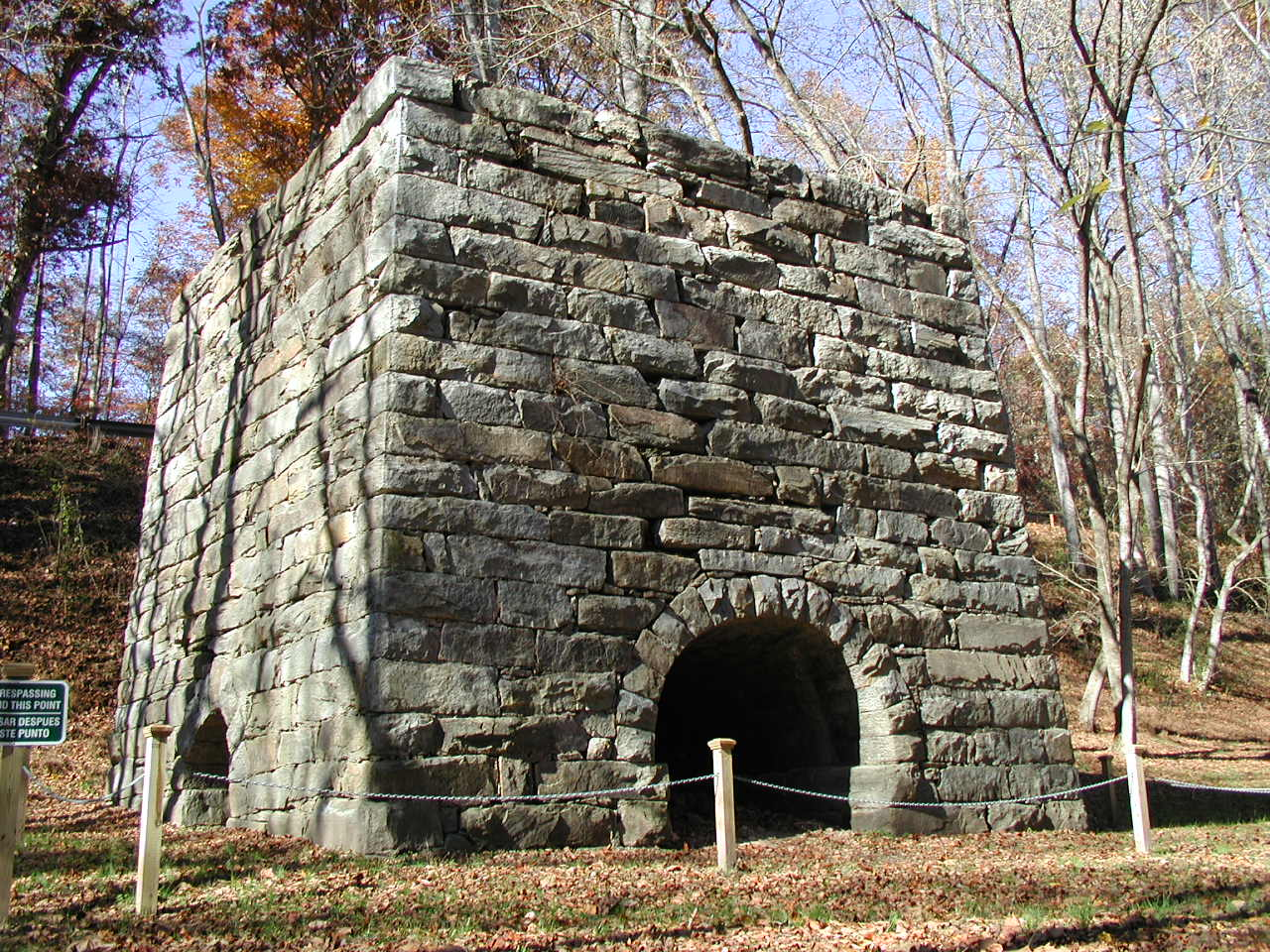
- Moratock Iron Furnace

- Location within North Carolina Location within the United States
- Location: On the Dan River in Danbury, North Carolina, just off Hwy 89.
- Coordinates: 36°24′27″N 80°11′59″W
- Area: 9 acres (3.6 ha)
- Built: 1843
- NRHP reference No.: 74001376
- Added to NRHP: July 30, 1974

Moratock Iron Furnace during the American Civil War

Moratock Park is a public park in Danbury, North Carolina that includes the site of Moratock Iron Furnace. Union cavalry, under the command of George Stoneman, destroyed most of the original foundryworks while conducting raids through the area in 1865 during the American Civil War.

It was added to the National Register of Historic Places in 1974.

== Gallery ==
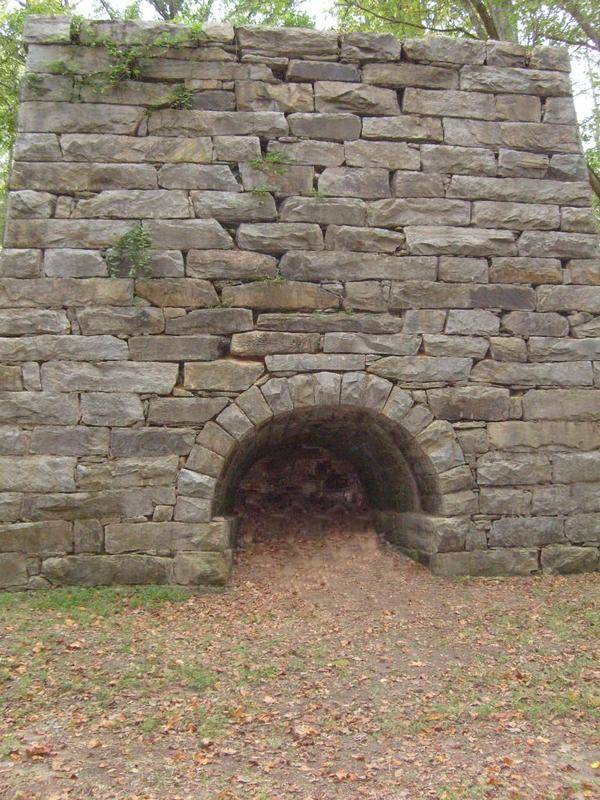

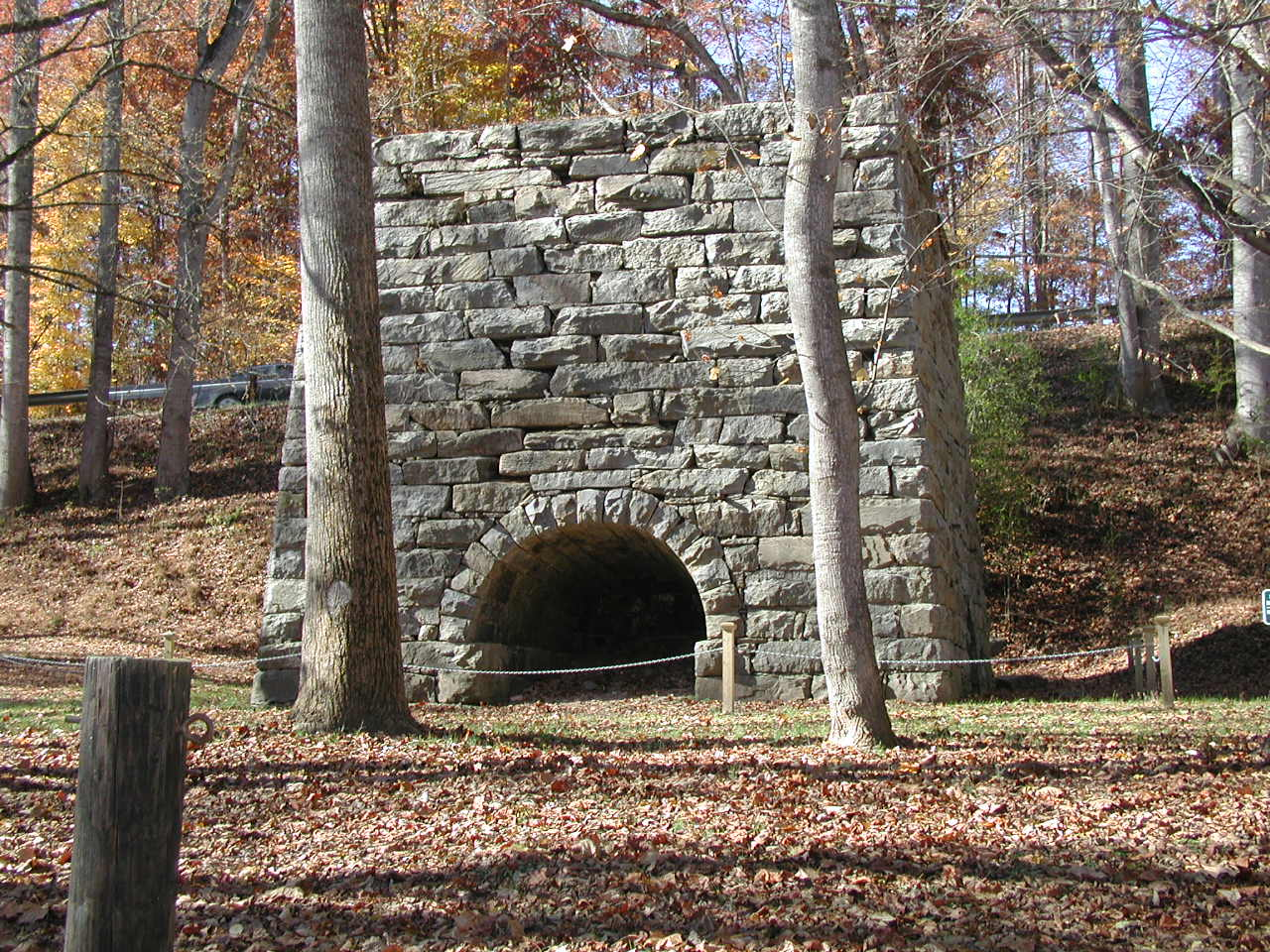

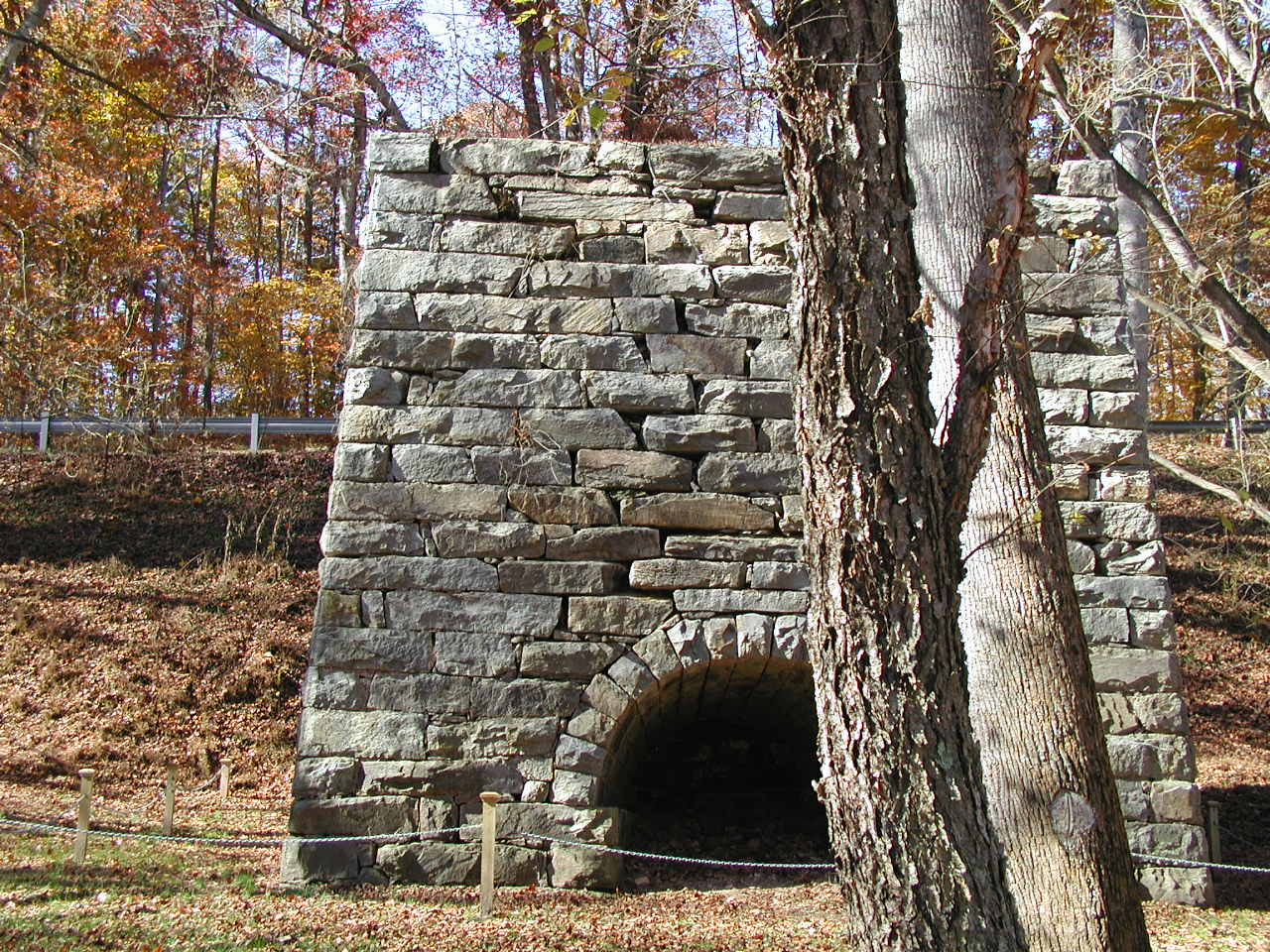
