= Jessup's Mill =

- U.S. National Register of Historic Places
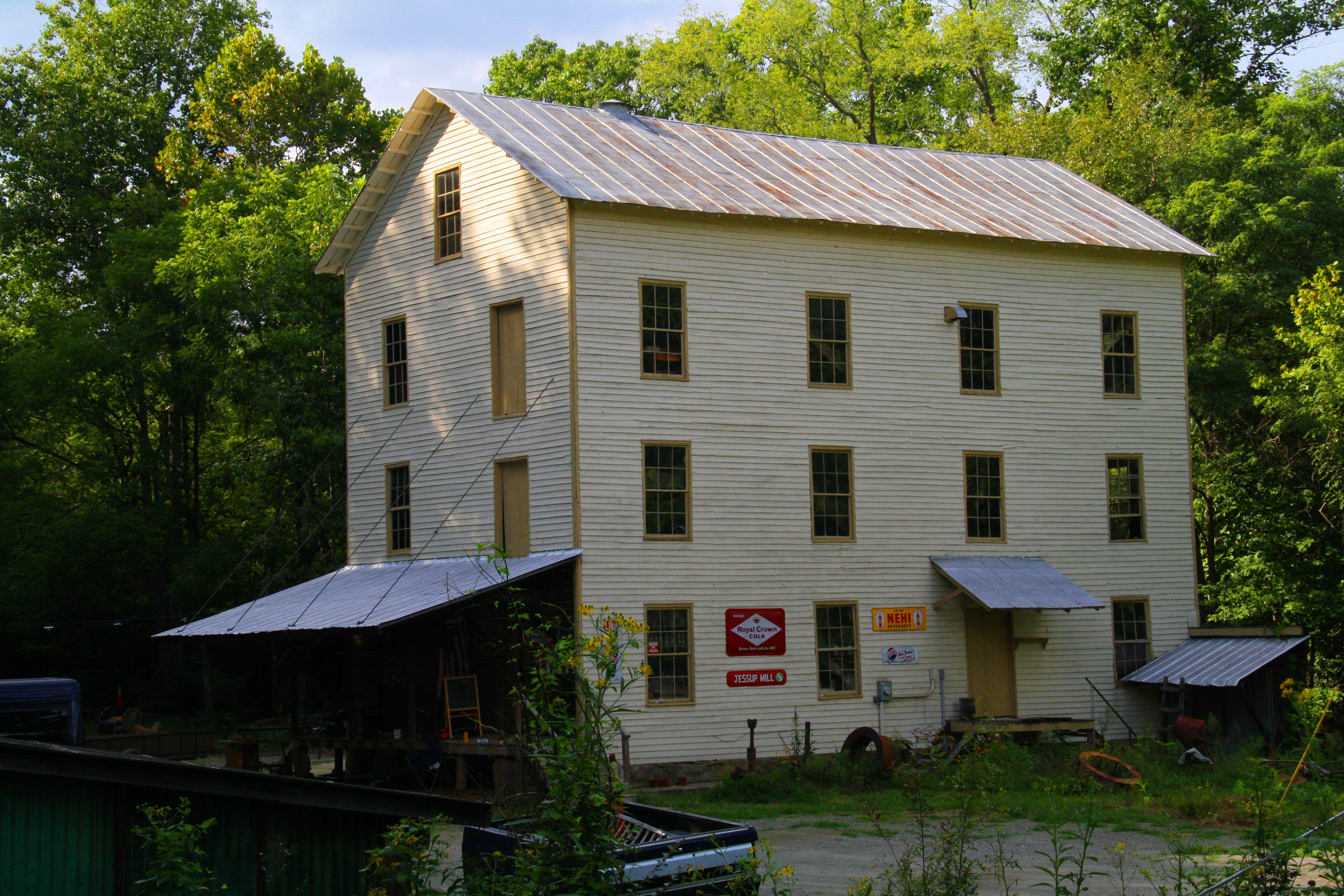

- Location within North Carolina Location within the United States
- Location: 1565 Collinstown Road, near Collinstown, North Carolina
- Coordinates: 36°31′32″N 80°22′17″W
- Area: 7 acres (2.8 ha)
- Built: 1910
- NRHP reference No.: 82003515
- Added to NRHP: July 15, 1982

Jessup's Mill, also known as Stokes County Union Milling Company, is historic grist mill, standing on the banks of the Dan River, in the community of Collinstown in northwest Stokes County, North Carolina. It was built in 1910, and is a tall 3 1/2-story, rectangular, heavy timber-frame building sheathed in weatherboard. Associated with the mill are the contributing warming room; the original miller's house, also known as "honeymoon cottage"; and outhouse.

It was added to the National Register of Historic Places in 1982.
