= Germanton, North Carolina =

- Census-designated place
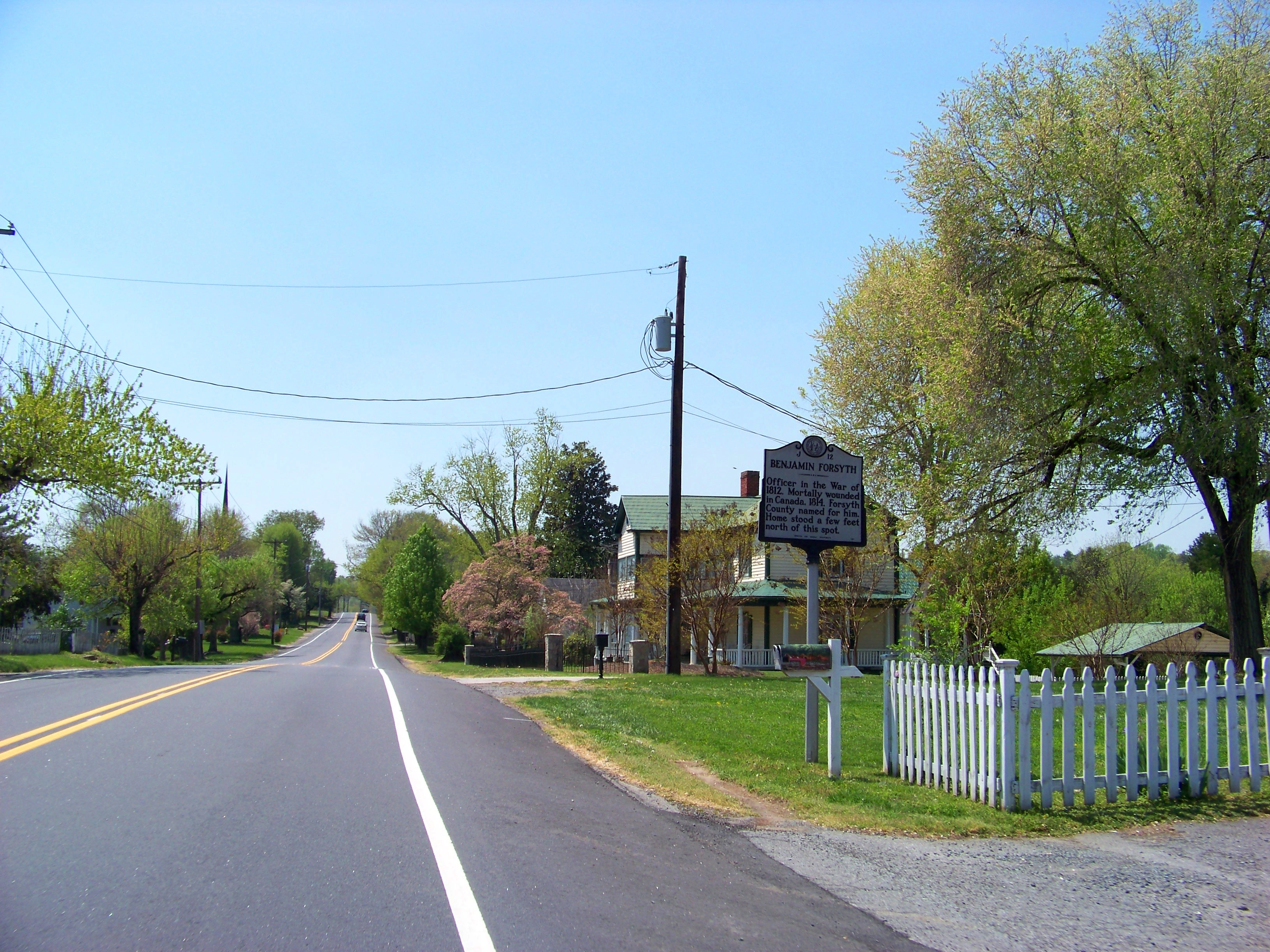

- Location within the state of North Carolina Germanton (the United States)
- Coordinates: 36°15′46″N 80°13′51″W
- Country: United States
- State: North Carolina
- Counties: Forsyth, Stokes
- Founded: 1790
- Incorporated: 1874 (repealed 1895)
- Named for: Germanic immigrants

Area
  - Total: 1.77 sq mi (4.58 km^{2})
  - Land: 1.75 sq mi (4.54 km^{2})
  - Water: 0.015 sq mi (0.04 km^{2})
- Elevation: 696 ft (212 m)

Population (2020)
  - Total: 790
  - Density: 451.1/sq mi (174.18/km^{2})
- Time zone: UTC-5 (Eastern (EST))
  - Summer (DST): UTC-4 (EDT)
- ZIP code: 27019
- FIPS code: 37-25880
- GNIS feature ID: 1020419

Germanton is an unincorporated community and census-designated place (CDP) in Forsyth and Stokes counties in the U.S. state of North Carolina, primarily in Stokes County. As of the 2020 census, the community had a population of 790.

It is located 13 miles (21 km) south of the Stokes County seat of Danbury, on North Carolina State Highways 8 and 65 at an altitude of 662 feet (202 m). Downtown Winston-Salem is 13 miles (21 km) to the south. Germanton was the county seat of Stokes County prior to Forsyth County being created from southern Stokes. Before the creation of Forsyth County, Germanton was centrally located within the Stokes County limits.

== History ==
Germanton was established in 1790 and is the oldest community in Stokes County. The town's original 23 acres (93,000 m^{2}) were part of a 700-acre (2.8 km^{2}) tract that was granted to Jacob Lash by the Earl of Granville in 1762. The 23 acres were deeded from brothers Michael and Henry Frey. The town was named after an influx of Germanic immigrants, who had served as veterans of the American Revolution, were given incentives to settle the area. These settlers included both Germans who fought against the crown, and Hessians who had been loyal to the crown. American Revolutionary War Major Joseph Winston, later a U.S. congressman, was a famous Germanton resident with a plantation nearby.

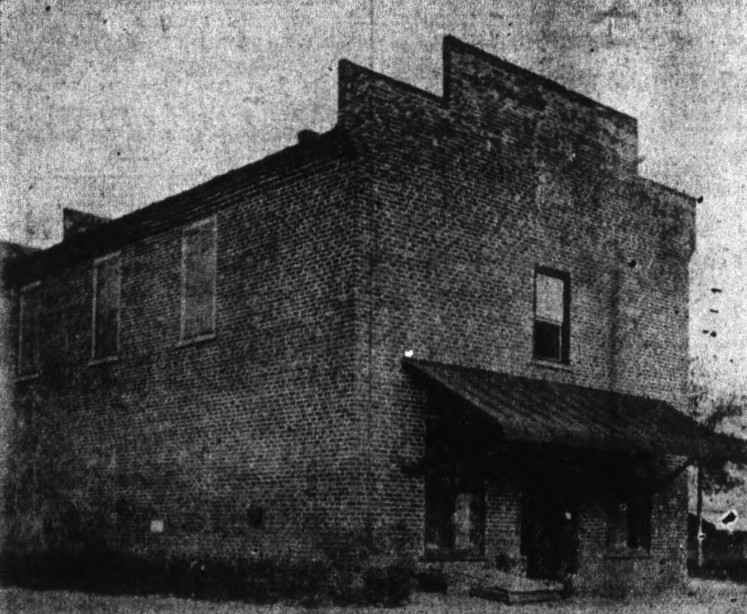
Stokes County Courthouse built in Germanton in about 1825

Germanton is located near the older Moravian settlements of Bethabara and Bethania, which were part of the Wachovia Tract settlement. The etymology of the "Germanton" name is often mistakenly attributed to this proximity. While Wachovia was settled for religious reasons by people originally from what is today the Czech Republic, the settlers of the Germanton area were primarily Lutheran, originally from areas in what is today Germany, and settled the area for non-religious purposes. Early Stokes county settlers were the result of land incentives by the State in 1790 given as a reward to those Germanic people who had fought for Independence.

The use of German as a mother tongue died out by the 1850s.

Coal was mined in the Germanton area in the late 19th century but was of low quality.

The Germanton Methodist Church and Cemetery, Leak-Chaffin-Browder House, and St. Philip's Episcopal Church are listed on the National Register of Historic Places.

== Demographics ==
Historical population
Census	Pop.	Note	%±
2020	790		—
U.S. Decennial Census

== Education ==
The portion in Forsyth County is within the Winston-Salem/Forsyth County Schools school district.

The portion in Stokes County is within the Stokes County Schools school district.
