= St. Philip's Episcopal Church (Germanton, North Carolina) =

Historic church in North Carolina, United States

- U.S. National Register of Historic Places
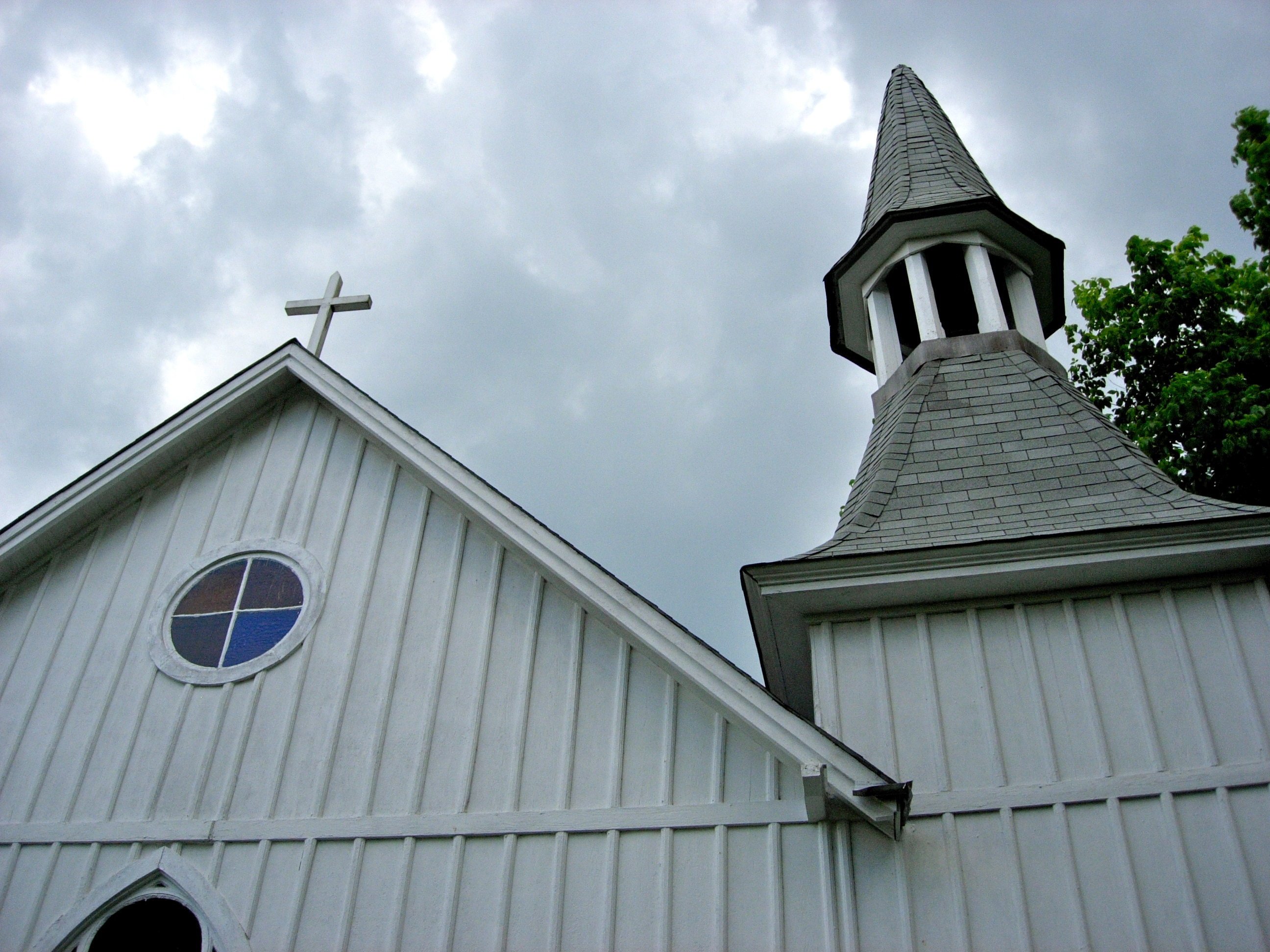

- Location within North Carolina Location within the United States
- Location: Building was removed by Episcopal Church
- Coordinates: 36°15′35″N 80°14′11″W
- Area: less than one acre
- Built: 1894
- Architectural style: Gothic Revival
- NRHP reference No.: 82003516
- Added to NRHP: July 15, 1982

St. Philip's Episcopal Church, also known as St. Philip's Church, is a historic Episcopal church located on NC 65 and 8 and SR 1957 in Germanton, Stokes County, North Carolina. It was built in 1890, consecrated in 1894, and is a one-story, Gothic Revival style board-and-batten frame building. It features a two-stage corner tower and belfry.

It was added to the National Register of Historic Places in 1982.

== Move to Chapel Hill ==
Due to the lack of a regular congregation to care for the building since the early 1980s, one or two annual services were held during Thanksgiving and at other special events from the 1990s to 2008. Endowments for the maintenance held by the Winston-Salem Foundation left by St. Philip's former members helped fund the maintenance since the 1930s, as well as grants from the Episcopal Diocese of North Carolina, all of which was overseen by a Historic Property Committee of the Diocese. As the clergy who organized the committee that cared for St. Philip's moved away and no one else stepped forward when Winston-Salem area Episcopal churches sought new leadership within Episcopal circles, that committee was dissolved by the diocese. The diocese considers the relocation of the building to be an instance of preservation via adaptive reuse.

In February 2012, the Winston-Salem Journal and WGHP reported that the diocese was planning to move the church to Chapel Hill, NC, where it will house the Episcopal Church of the Advocate. Bishop Michael Curry of the Episcopal Diocese explained the rationale for the move in a public letter, stating “The St. Philip’s Episcopal Church building was constructed, and later consecrated and dedicated, as a house of prayer and worship for an Episcopal community of faith. The priority of the Diocese of North Carolina is for that purpose to be honored if at all possible. In this way, the building’s history and heritage will be most fully and faithfully preserved."

In response, a group of Stokes and Forsyth County citizens formed the nonprofit Friends of St. Philips Church of Germanton, in hopes of providing an alternative to removal of the church. Friends of St. Philips Church of Germanton hopes to continue the church's life in Germanton as a place of worship and reverent celebration of the arts. A separate group has also formed an ecumenical congregation interested in worshiping in the Episcopal tradition in Germanton was formed in June 2012 and currently meets weekly, but was unable to get permission to use the church building before it was removed in the fall of 2012.
