= Pilot Mountain State Park =

State park in North Carolina, United States

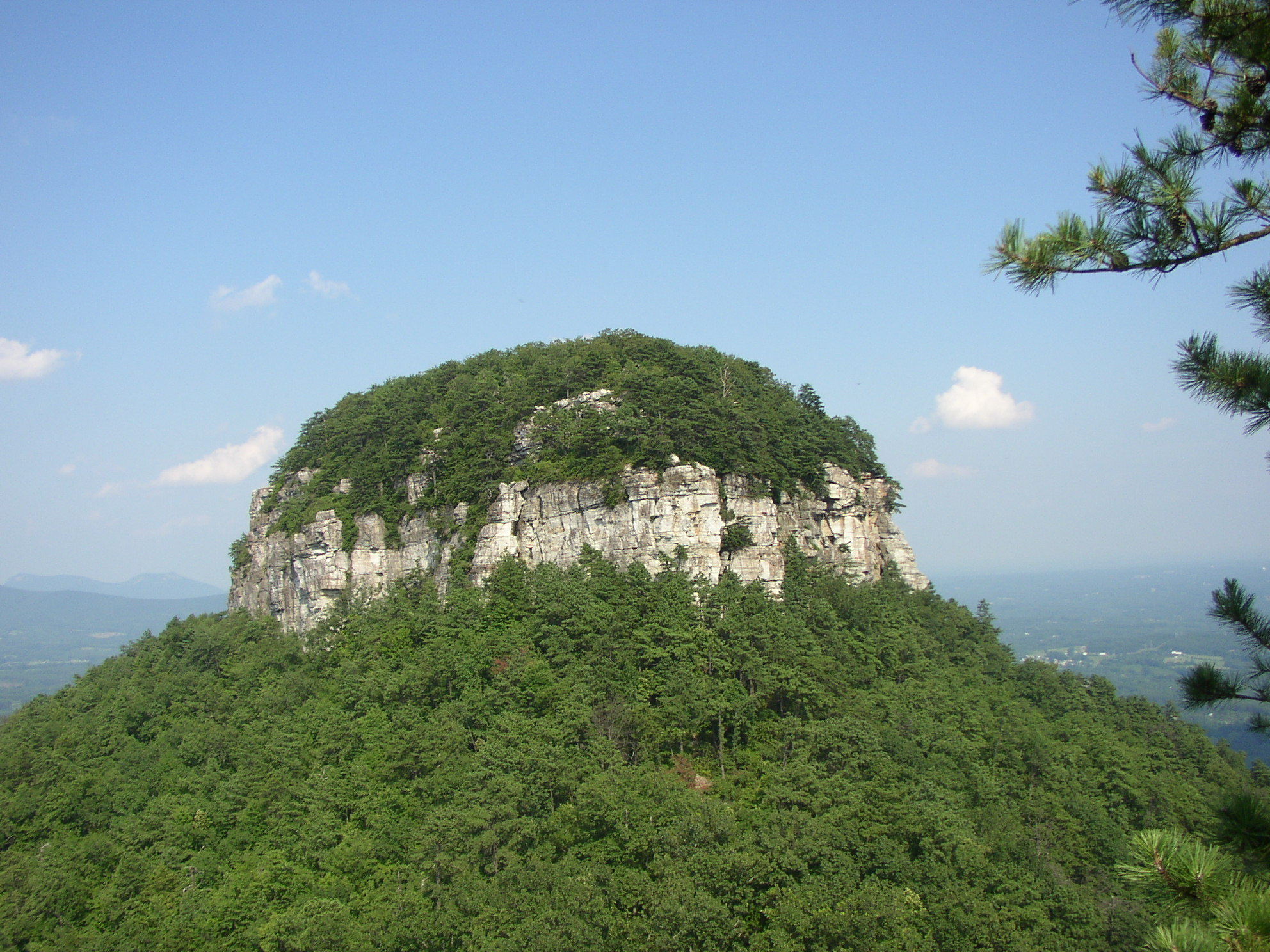
- The distinctive Big Pinnacle of Pilot Mountain

- Location within North Carolina Location within the United States
- Interactive map of Pilot Mountain State Park
- Location: Surry and Yadkin counties, North Carolina, United States
- Coordinates: 36°20′29″N 80°27′47″W
- Area: 3,872 acres (1,567 ha)
- Established: 1968
- Administrator: North Carolina Division of Parks and Recreation
- Website: Official website

Pilot Mountain State Park is a North Carolina state park in Surry and Yadkin Counties, North Carolina in the United States. Located near Pinnacle, North Carolina on highway US 52, it covers 3,872 acres (15.67 km^{2}) and includes the distinctive 2,241 foot (683 m) peak of Pilot Mountain.

== History ==
The Saura, a Native American tribe of the North Carolina Piedmont region, knew the mountain as Jomeokee meaning the Great Guide. It served as a guidepost also for the European settlers of the Carolina who similarly named it Pilot.

Due to the effects of European diseases and attacks by northern Indians, particularly the Seneca, the Saura Indians abandoned the area around 1700. The first European settlers in the area arrived in the late 1740s from Pennsylvania. Settlement in the area was slow due to its isolation. There are numerous accounts in the Records of the Moravians in North Carolina which related to groups of highwaymen, or bandits, who used the mountains as a refuge throughout the 1750s and 1760s.

After serving as a commercial tourist attraction, Pilot Mountain became a North Carolina state park in 1968. It was established as a state park in order to protect the mountain and surrounding lands from being overdeveloped. The Pilot Mountain Preservation and Park Committee purchased the land from Mrs. J. W. Beasley by raising funds and acquired a grant from the federal government. Additional lands along the Yadkin River were purchased in 1970. Further purchases have brought Pilot Mountain State Park to a total size of 3,703 acres (14.99 km^{2}).

On November 8, 2012, a prescribed burn of 70 acres got out of control leading to a wildfire on the mountain's steep western slope.

In November 27, 2021, a massive wildfire broke out across Pilot Mountain State Park that burned 1,050 acres.

== Recreation ==
Pilot Mountain State Park is for year-round recreation. Activities at the park include, camping, canoeing, fishing, rock climbing, picnicking, hiking, and environmental education.

The Yadkin River provides opportunities for visitors to the park to fish and canoe. The Yadkin River Canoe Trail is 165 mile (265 km) long and follows the course of the river to its confluence with the Uwharrie River at the Pee Dee River in south central North Carolina. Two miles (3.22 km) of the river pass through Pilot Mountain State Park. The river is broad and shallow at the park with two islands that can be reached by canoe or by wading when the water level is low. All anglers need to have a license from the North Carolina Wildlife Resource Commission. The common game fish are sunfish, catfish and crappie.

A family camping area is on the lower slopes of Pilot Mountain. It has 49 campsites that are open to tents or trailers that are scattered in a forest of hickory and oak trees. Each campsite comes equipped with a charcoal grill, picnic table and tent pad. Modern restroom facilities with hot water and showers are located nearby. A large and rustic youth group camping area is located on the north side of the park's Yadkin River Section. Canoeists are not permitted to camp on the islands of the river. A designated canoe campsite on the bank is available by reservation by contacting the park office.

There are three picnic areas at Pilot Mountain State Park. One picnic area is near the summit parking lot and two are near the Yadkin River. The area has many picnic tables and grills. No drinking water is available in this area. Pit toilets are available.

Rock climbing is permitted in some designated sections of the park. All climbers must register with park staff. Climbing and rappelling are not permitted on the face of Pilot Mountain, Big Pinnacle. A list of rules and regulations can be obtained from the park offices. Many miles of trail at Pilot Mountain State Park are open to hiking and horse back riding. Rules and regulations can be obtained at the park offices.

== Ecology ==
The ecology of Pilot Mountain State Park is similar to the ecology of the Blue Ridge Mountains which are west of Surry County. Big Pinnacle is ringed by Catawba rhododendron which has pink blossoms in the spring, making the mountain appear as if it is wearing a "pink crown". Mountain laurel can be found throughout the park as can wild blueberry, huckleberry and grapes. The forests are mainly chestnut oak, Table Mountain pine and pitch pine trees.

Wildlife consists of animals that are typical to an eastern woodland environment including the American toad, Carolina wren, white-tailed deer, opossums and raccoons. There are often vultures soaring on the updrafts from Pilot Knob, and may be joined by the occasional common raven which are not common east of the Blue Ridge Mountains

== See also ==
- Pilot Mountain
- Horne Creek State Historic Site
