= Walnut Cove Colored School =

Historic school building in North Carolina, United States

- U.S. National Register of Historic Places
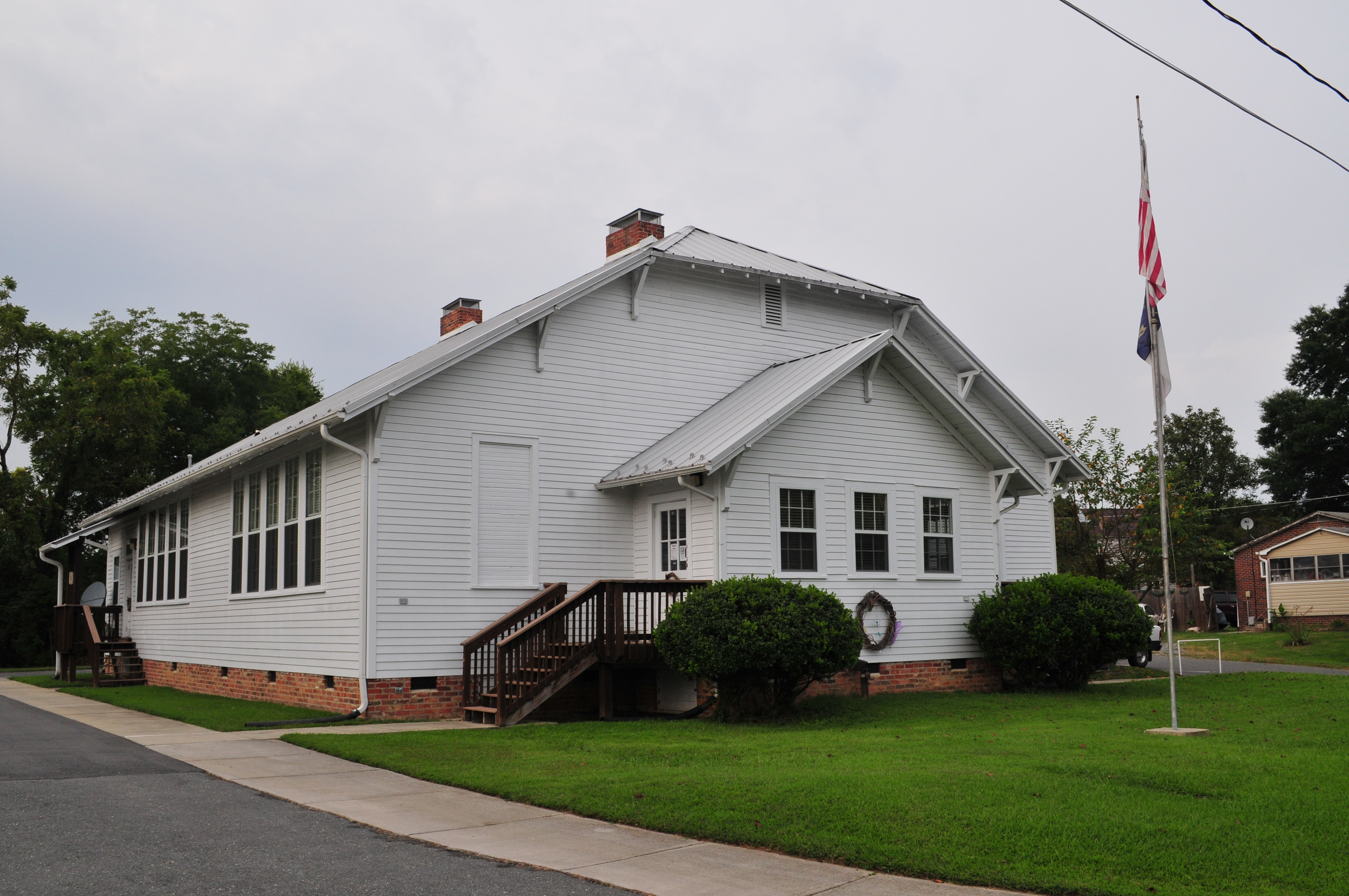
- The Historic Walnut Cove Colored School, August 2013

- Location within North Carolina Location within the United States
- Location: Jct. of Brook and Dalton Sts., NW corner, Walnut Cove, North Carolina
- Coordinates: 36°18′12″N 80°8′39″W
- Area: less than one acre
- Built: 1921
- Built by: Rosenwald Fund Plan; Dan River Lumber and Milling Co.
- Architectural style: Bungalow/craftsman
- NRHP reference No.: 95000161
- Added to NRHP: February 24, 1995

The Walnut Cove Colored School is a historic Rosenwald School located in Walnut Cove, Stokes County, North Carolina. It was built in 1921 with seed funds from Sears & Roebuck financier, Julius Rosenwald with advice and counsel of the great educator, Booker t. Washington. A condition of the funding was that communities had to provide local matching funds. Communities which built the Rosenwald schools actually provided more funding than Julius Rosenwald's initial seed funds. It is a one-story, rectangular frame building with five classrooms and Bungalow / American Craftsman design elements. It has weatherboard siding, a broad clipped gable roof, large sash windows, and a projecting front vestibule. The building measures approximately 49 feet wide by 73 feet deep and rests on a brick foundation. It housed a school until 1952. It was later renovated for use as a senior citizens' community center.

It was added to the National Register of Historic Places in 1995.
