= Leak-Chaffin-Browder House =

Historic house in North Carolina, United States

- U.S. National Register of Historic Places
- Location within North Carolina Location within the United States
- Location: NC 8, 0.1 miles S of jct. with NC 1941, near Germanton, North Carolina
- Coordinates: 36°16′33″N 80°13′14″W
- Area: 3 acres (1.2 ha)
- Built: 1853-1860
- Architectural style: Greek Revival, Colonial Revival
- NRHP reference No.: 02000943
- Added to NRHP: September 6, 2002

Leak-Chaffin-Browder House is historic home located near Germanton, Stokes County, North Carolina. It was built between about 1853 and 1860, and is a large two-story, Greek Revival-style brick dwelling. It has a Colonial Revival style front porch that dates from the early 20th century. Also on the property are the contributing kitchen-slave/servants' house, granary/tobacco pack house, wood shed, privy, shed, barn, and combination corn crib, equipment shed, and meat house.

It was added to the National Register of Historic Places in 2002.
