= R. W. George Mill =

- U.S. National Register of Historic Places
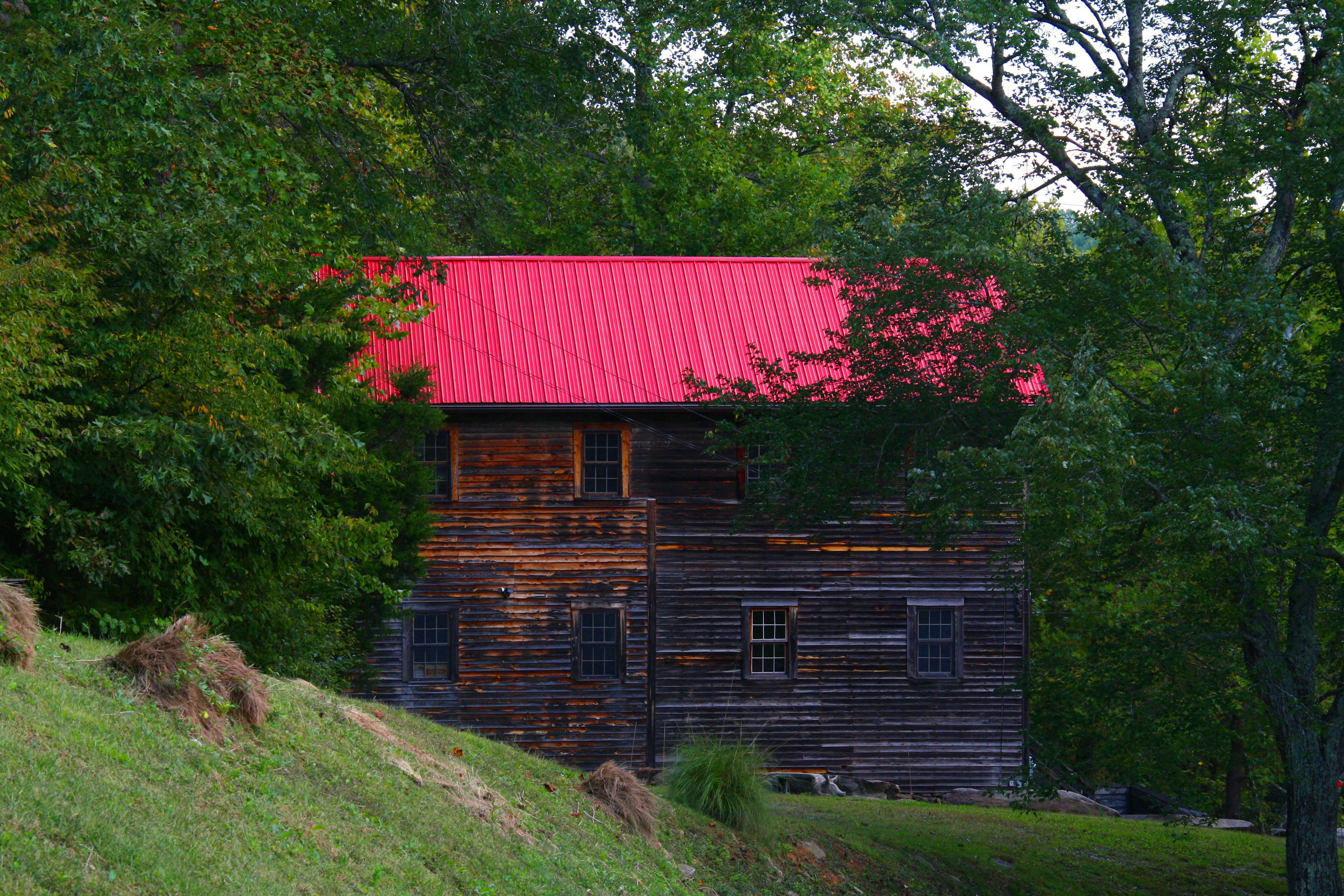
- R. W. George Mill, September 2014

- Location within North Carolina Location within the United States
- Location: NC 89, 0.6 mi NE of jct. of NC 89 and NC 66, near Francisco, North Carolina
- Coordinates: 36°29′33″N 80°23′33″W
- Area: 4.2 acres (1.7 ha)
- Built: 1881
- NRHP reference No.: 97001199
- Added to NRHP: October 10, 1997

R. W. George Mill, also known as Bob George's Mill and Spencer Mill, is historic corn mill located near Francisco, Stokes County, North Carolina. It was built in 1881, and is a two-story, rectangular, frame building sheathed in weatherboard. It has a gable roof and three frame additions dating from the mid-1940s. Also on the property is the contributing concrete mill dam. During World War II, it was converted from a corn mill to a small textile mill, known as Spencer Mills, that produced parachute fabric for the federal government.

It was added to the National Register of Historic Places in 1997.
