= Germanton Methodist Church and Cemetery =

Historic church in North Carolina, United States

- U.S. National Register of Historic Places
- Location within North Carolina Location within the United States
- Location: Main St., jct. of Main St. and Willow St., Germanton, North Carolina
- Coordinates: 36°15′39″N 80°14′0″W
- Area: 1.1 acres (0.45 ha)
- Built: 1856
- Architectural style: Greek Revival, Prairie School
- NRHP reference No.: 98000259
- Added to NRHP: March 19, 1998

Germanton Methodist Church and Cemetery is a historic Methodist church and cemetery located on Main Street at the junction of Main Street and Willow Street in Germanton, Stokes County, North Carolina. It was built in 1856, and is a simple two-story, rectangular brick building with a front gable roof, with Greek Revival detailing. It features a central three-part belfry atop the roof. The cemetery contains markers dated to the 1820s.

It was added to the National Register of Historic Places in 1998.
