= Hanging Rock State Park =

State park in North Carolina, United States

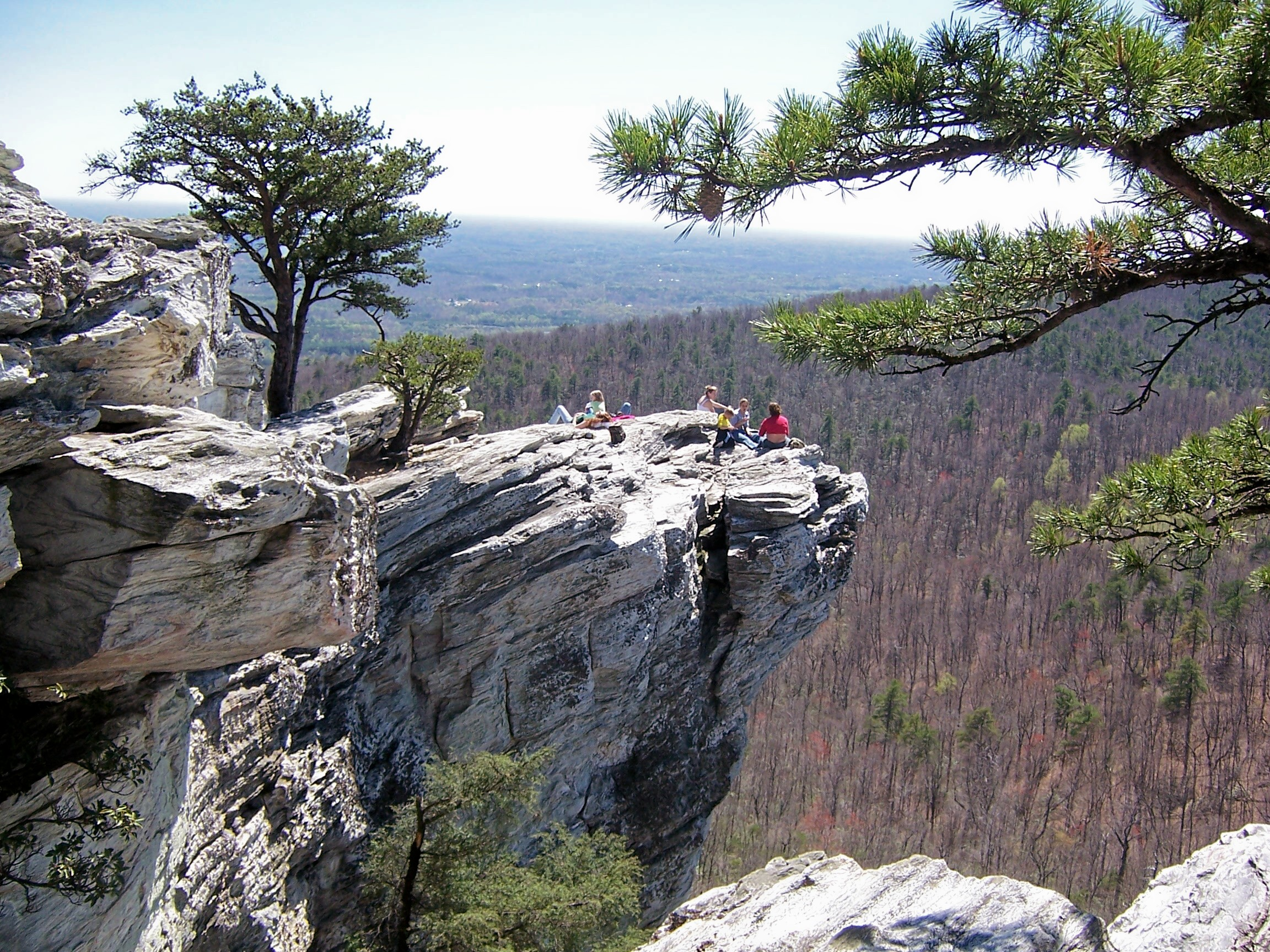

- Location within North Carolina Location within the United States
- Interactive map of Hanging Rock State Park
- Location: Stokes County, North Carolina, United States
- Coordinates: 36°24′43″N 80°15′15″W
- Area: 9,011 acres (3,647 ha)
- Established: 1936
- Administrator: North Carolina Division of Parks and Recreation
- Website: Official website
- Hanging Rock State Park Bathhouse
- U.S. National Register of Historic Places
- U.S. Historic district
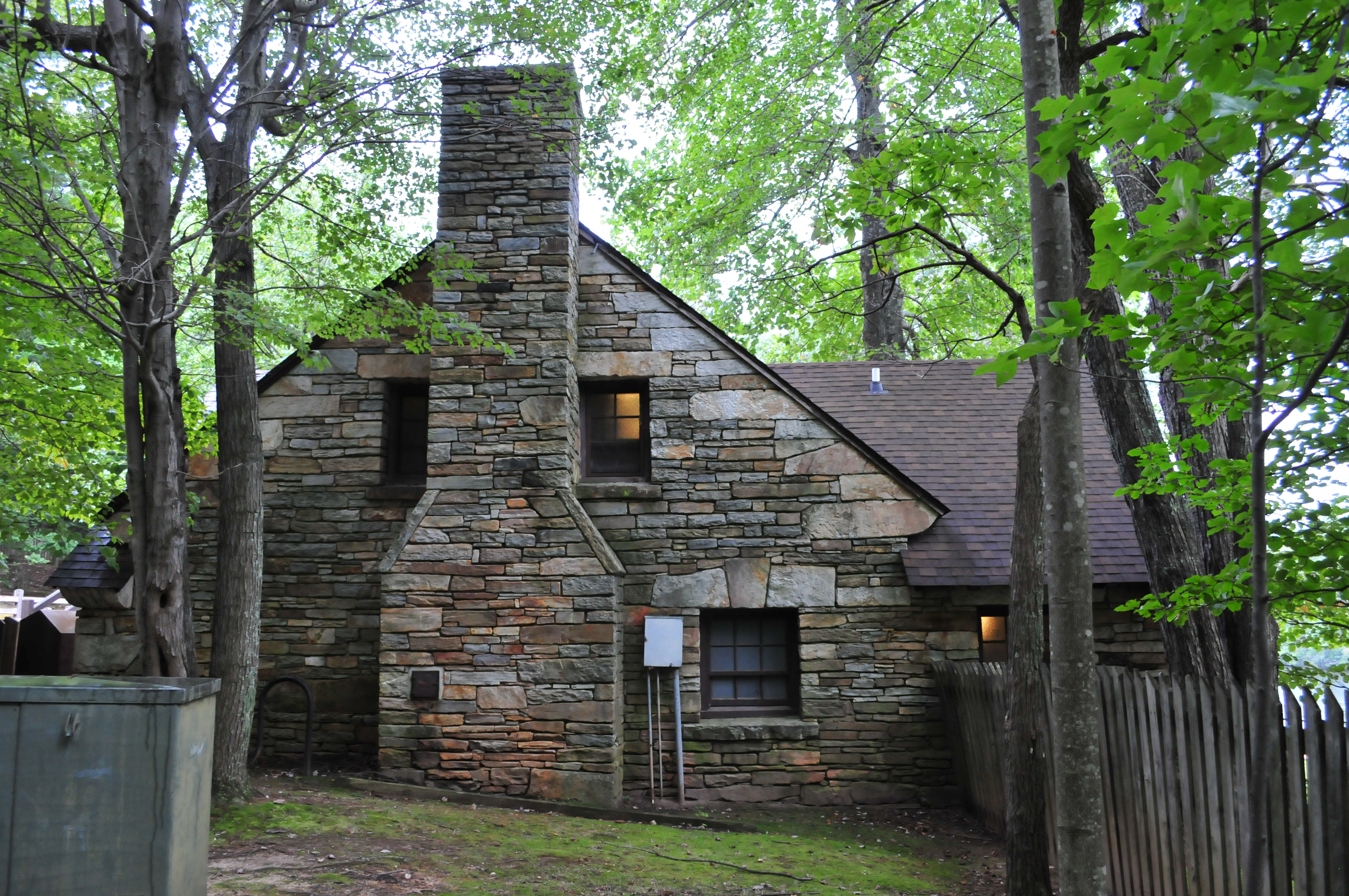
- Hanging Rock State Park Bathhouse, September 2013
- Nearest city: Danbury, North Carolina
- Area: 24 acres (9.7 ha)
- Built: 1939
- Built by: Civilian Conservation Corps
- Architect: Robert S. Ormand
- Architectural style: Rustic
- NRHP reference No.: 91001507
- Added to NRHP: October 24, 1991

Hanging Rock State Park is a 9,011-acre (3,647 ha) North Carolina state park in Stokes County, North Carolina in the United States. The park is 30 miles (48 km) north of Winston-Salem and is located approximately 2 miles (3.2 km) from Danbury in Stokes County.

== History ==
On April 20, 1936, the Winston-Salem Foundation and the Stokes County Committee for Hanging Rock donated 3,096 acres (1,253 ha) to North Carolina for establishing a state park. Prior to this, the land had been owned by developers intent on creating a mountain resort on its highest summit. The plans fell through when the developers went bankrupt during the initial construction. After the state acquired the property, the Civilian Conservation Corps built the original facilities between 1935 and 1942, including the construction of a 12-acre (4.9 ha) lake and bathhouse that was listed on the National Register of Historic Places in 1991. Additional land acquisitions in the 1970s added to the park the Lower Cascades, a spectacular 40-foot (12 m) waterfall, and the Tory's Den, a rock outcropping rumored to have served as a hideout for British Loyalists during the American Revolutionary War. Another large land purchase in 2000 added Flat Shoals Mountain, a smaller summit visible from the top of Hanging Rock, to the park.

== Location ==
Hanging Rock State Park is located in the Sauratown Mountain Range, one of the most easterly mountain ranges in the state. Often called "the mountains away from the mountains," the Sauratown range is made up of monadnocks that are separated from the nearby Blue Ridge Mountains. The Sauratown Mountains lie completely within the borders of Stokes and Surry counties. Prominent peaks in the Sauratown range rise from 1,700 feet (520 m) to more than 2,500 feet (760 m) in elevation and stand in bold contrast to the surrounding countryside, which averages only 800 feet (240 m) in elevation. The most well known peak in the range is Pilot Mountain in nearby Pilot Mountain State Park. The highest point in the park – and the highest point in the Sauratown Mountain range – is Moore's Knob. It rises to 2,579 feet (786 m) above sea level.

== Geology ==
Named for the Saura Native Americans who were early inhabitants of the region, the rocky tops of the Sauratown Mountains consist of quartzite remnants of a once-broad layer of rock that covered the region. Two main hypotheses for the original deposition of this quartzite sand are the early-rift and drift models. The early-rift model suggests that the sand was deposited on a raised underwater ridge during the early formation of the Iapetus Ocean in the Late Proterozoic era. The drift model suggests that this sand was deposited later, during the Early Cambrian period, by shallow waters as the North American continental fragment drifted during the widening of the Iapetus Ocean.

Over many years, wind, water and other forces eroded the surrounding blanket of rock, forming a tectonic window. What remains of these ancient mountains is the erosion-resistant quartzite, which now supports scenic ridges and knobs, including Moore's Knob, Moore's Wall, Cook's Wall, Devil's Chimney, Wolf Rock and Hanging Rock.

== Ecology ==
Due to its unique location, the park is home to a number of species of flora that are more commonly found in the westernmost part of the state. Carolina and Canadian hemlock grow alongside each other, and in the spring visitors can view the colorful displays of rhododendron, mountain laurel, pinxter azalea, and a number of other wildflowers. Much of the park is an oak-hickory forest, with chestnut oak the dominant hardwood.

The park is also home to the rare Wehrle's salamander, and peregrine falcons have been known to nest in the crags on the park's high peaks. Ravens and vultures may be seen calling and circling overhead. Visitors might see white-tailed deer, wild turkey, and rarely American Black Bears while walking the park trails.

Two venomous snakes, the copperhead and timber rattlesnake, live in the park, but they do not bother unless provoked. All wildlife is protected at Hanging Rock just as in all other North Carolina State Parks.

== Activities ==
Hanging Rock State Park offers over 48 miles (77 km) of trails where visitors can hike to its numerous peaks and waterfalls. The park has a 73-site tent and trailer campground (minus R/V hookups) and 10 vacation cabins for overnight accommodations. The lake and bathhouse, open from Memorial Day – Labor Day, offers swimming and boat rentals. Rock climbing is permitted at Moore's Wall and Cook's Wall but is not allowed at the Hanging Rock summit. The visitor center and museum room is open daily. There is no admission fee to the park.

The Mountains-to-Sea Trail pass through the park and joins with the Sauratown Trail.

== Waterfalls ==
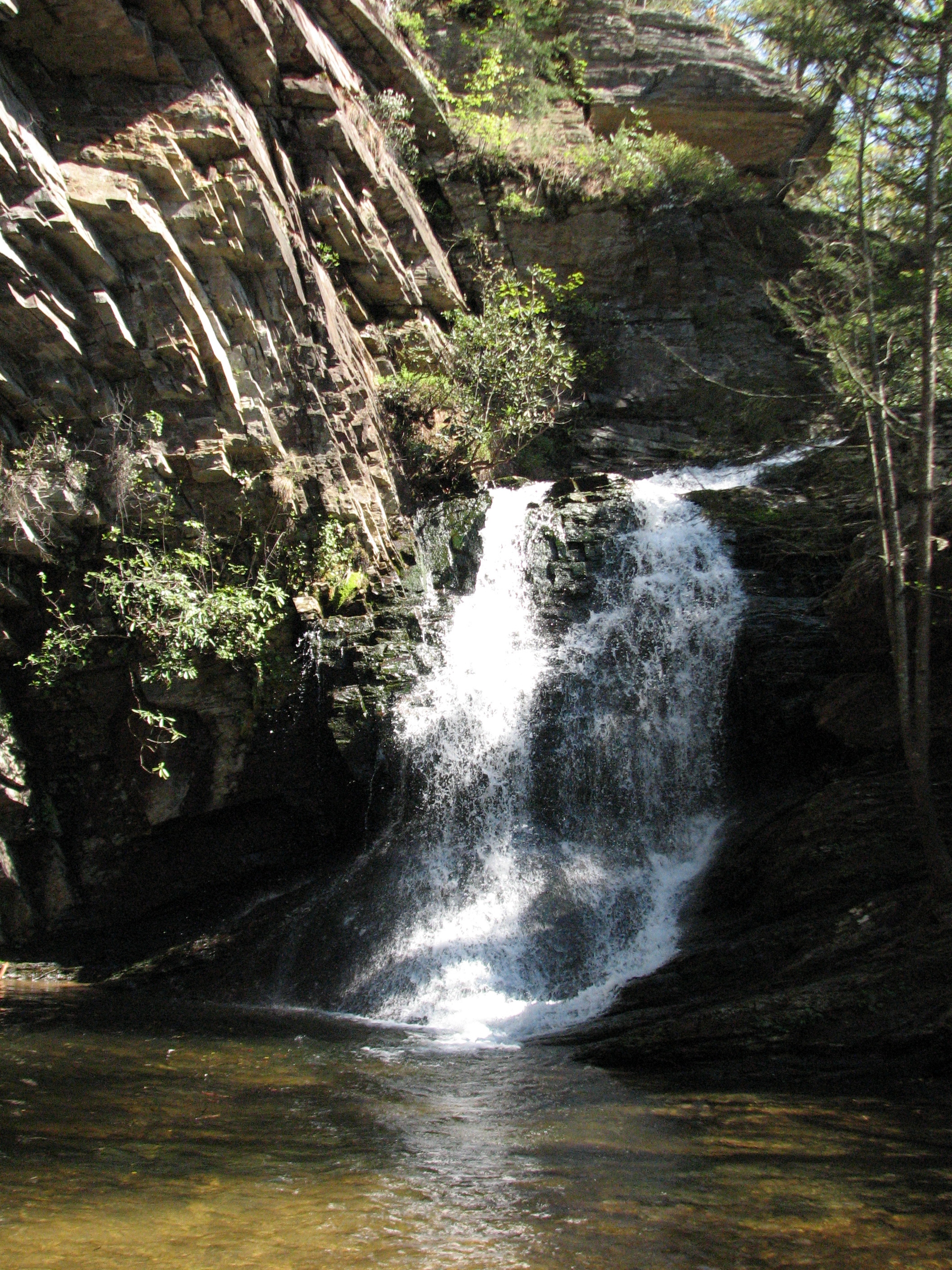
Lower Cascades

The park is the home to at least 5 significant waterfalls (listed in order of height):

- Tory's Falls
- Upper Cascades
- Lower Cascades
- Window Falls
- Hidden Falls
