= Rock House (King, North Carolina) =

Historic house in North Carolina, United States

- U.S. National Register of Historic Places
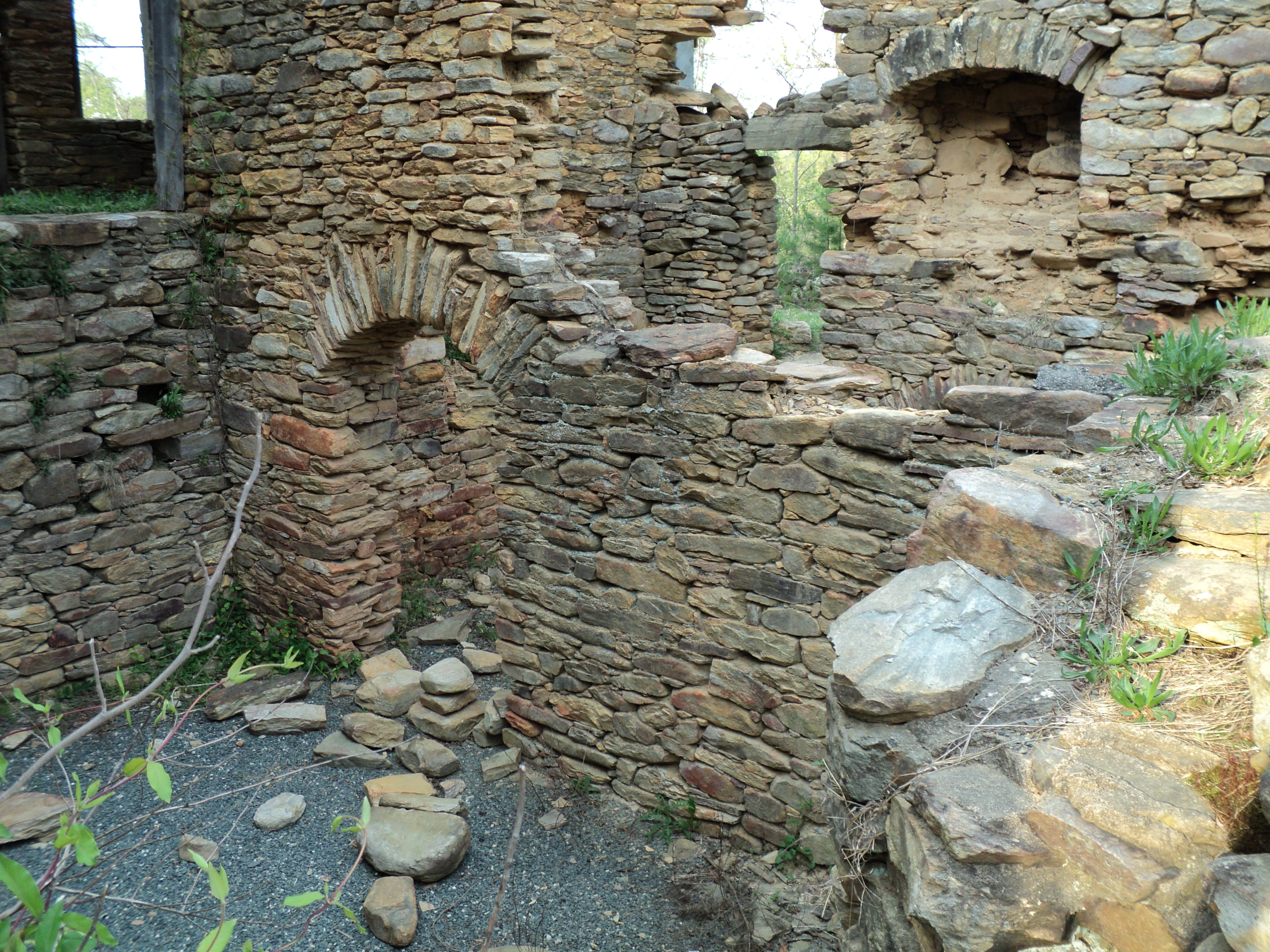
- Detail interior Rock House, April 2010

- Location within North Carolina Location within the United States
- Location: N of King on SR 1186, near King, North Carolina
- Coordinates: 36°24′17″N 80°21′44″W
- Area: 4 acres (1.6 ha)
- Built: 1785
- NRHP reference No.: 75001292
- Added to NRHP: October 1, 1975

Rock House, also known as the John Martin House, is a historic home located near King, Stokes County, North Carolina. It was built about 1785, and is a two-story, fieldstone ruin. It has been a ruin since the late-19th century. It is believed to have been built by Colonel John Martin, an early landowner in Stokes County. The property is maintained by the Stokes County Historical Society.

It was added to the National Register of Historic Places in 1975.
