= Stokes County Courthouse =

Historic courthouse in North Carolina

- U.S. National Register of Historic Places
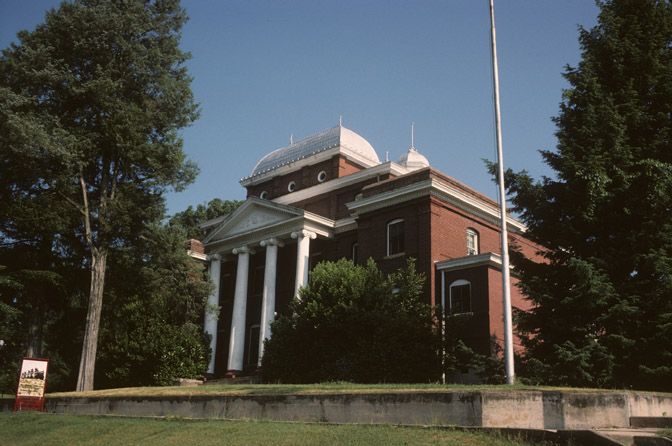
- Stokes County Courthouse, July 1975

- Location within North Carolina Location within the United States
- Location: Main St. between North St. and Courthouse Rd., Danbury, North Carolina
- Coordinates: 36°24′34″N 80°12′22″W
- Area: less than one acre
- Built: 1904
- Architect: Wheeler & Runge
- Architectural style: Classical Revival, Beaux Arts
- MPS: North Carolina County Courthouses TR
- NRHP reference No.: 79001750
- Added to NRHP: May 10, 1979

The Stokes County Courthouse in Danbury, North Carolina, United States was designed by Wheeler & Runge in Classical Revival and Beaux Arts styles. It was built in 1904.

It was listed on the National Register of Historic Places in 1979. The listing included three contributing buildings on 3.1 acres (1.3 ha).
