= Danbury, North Carolina =

- Town
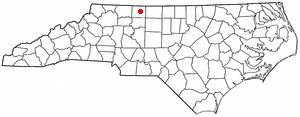
- Location of Danbury, North Carolina
- Coordinates: 36°24′40″N 80°12′43″W
- Country: United States
- State: North Carolina
- County: Stokes
- Founded: 1851
- Incorporated: 1957
- Named for: A plantation owned by Alexander Martin

Government
  - Type: Mayor-Council
  - Mayor: Janet Whitt

Area
  - Total: 0.75 sq mi (1.95 km^{2})
  - Land: 0.75 sq mi (1.94 km^{2})
  - Water: 0.0039 sq mi (0.01 km^{2})
- Elevation: 778 ft (237 m)

Population (2020)
  - Total: 189
  - Density: 252/sq mi (97.3/km^{2})
- Time zone: UTC-5 (Eastern (EST))
  - Summer (DST): UTC-4 (EDT)
- ZIP code: 27016
- Area code: 336
- FIPS code: 37-16240
- GNIS feature ID: 2406352
- Website: www.townofdanbury.org

Danbury is a town located in Danbury Township, Stokes County, North Carolina, United States. As of the 2020 census, the town had a total population of 142. It is the county seat of Stokes County. Danbury is located on North Carolina Highway 8/89 approximately 20 miles (32 km) north of Winston-Salem and is the "Gateway to Hanging Rock". The Stokes County Government Center, Arts Council, school board, county jail, a public library, a post office, and other public services are found within the town limits. LifeBrite Community Hospital of Stokes is located about a half mile northwest of the town. North Stokes High School, a big part of town, is located 7.4 miles to the northwest (North NC Highway 89 to Piney Grove Church Road, then left onto North Stokes School Road).

Danbury is a popular rest stop for bicyclists, motorcyclists, and driving enthusiasts due to the numerous scenic roads in Stokes County. Danbury also attracts outdoor enthusiasts because of its location on the Dan River and near the entrance to Hanging Rock State Park.

There are no regional or national franchises in Danbury, only local shops like the Danbury General Store, and small restaurants. J.E.Priddy's General Store, a local historic landmark dating from the late 19th century, is still in business selling goods old and new. It is located about 2 miles (3.2 km) east of town on Sheppard Mill Rd.

== History ==
Danbury was founded in 1851 specifically to serve as the new centrally located county seat after Stokes County was divided in 1849, creating Forsyth County to the south (with the new county seat of Winston, later Winston-Salem) and a smaller Stokes County. Danbury was briefly known as Crawford.

No battles occurred in Danbury during the Civil War, but it housed and supported the war efforts of the Confederate Army. The Moratock Iron Furnace, which is still found in Moratock Park, was used in the smelting of iron ore. General George Stoneman's raid passed through Danbury on April 9, 1865, the day of the surrender of Confederate forces at Appomattox Court House, Va. Other historical features in the town include the Wilson Fulton House, the Old Stokes County Court House, and Moody's Tavern (later McCanless Hotel).

In addition to the Moratock Iron Furnace, the Danbury Historic District, Hanging Rock State Park Bathhouse, and Stokes County Courthouse are listed on the National Register of Historic Places.

== Geography ==
According to the United States Census Bureau, the town has a total area of 0.6 square miles (1.6 km^{2}).

=== Climate ===
Climate data for Danbury, North Carolina (1991–2020)
Month	Jan	Feb	Mar	Apr	May	Jun	Jul	Aug	Sep	Oct	Nov	Dec	Year
Mean daily maximum °F (°C)	47.9 (8.8)	51.6 (10.9)	59.3 (15.2)	69.5 (20.8)	76.5 (24.7)	83.7 (28.7)	87.2 (30.7)	85.1 (29.5)	79.4 (26.3)	70.2 (21.2)	59.9 (15.5)	51.1 (10.6)	68.5 (20.2)
Daily mean °F (°C)	38.2 (3.4)	41.0 (5.0)	47.9 (8.8)	57.0 (13.9)	65.5 (18.6)	73.4 (23.0)	77.4 (25.2)	75.6 (24.2)	69.4 (20.8)	58.5 (14.7)	48.0 (8.9)	41.2 (5.1)	57.8 (14.3)
Mean daily minimum °F (°C)	28.6 (−1.9)	30.3 (−0.9)	36.4 (2.4)	44.5 (6.9)	54.5 (12.5)	63.1 (17.3)	67.6 (19.8)	66.1 (18.9)	59.4 (15.2)	46.7 (8.2)	36.0 (2.2)	31.4 (−0.3)	47.1 (8.4)
Average precipitation inches (mm)	3.75 (95)	2.93 (74)	4.09 (104)	3.93 (100)	4.41 (112)	4.17 (106)	4.28 (109)	4.38 (111)	4.98 (126)	3.49 (89)	3.07 (78)	3.96 (101)	47.44 (1,205)
Average snowfall inches (cm)	2.6 (6.6)	2.8 (7.1)	1.1 (2.8)	0.1 (0.25)	0.0 (0.0)	0.0 (0.0)	0.0 (0.0)	0.0 (0.0)	0.0 (0.0)	0.0 (0.0)	0.0 (0.0)	2.1 (5.3)	8.7 (22.05)
Source: NOAA

== Demographics ==
Historical population
Census	Pop.	Note	%±
1880	144		—
1960	175		—
1970	152		−13.1%
1980	140		−7.9%
1990	119		−15.0%
2000	108		−9.2%
2010	189		75.0%
2020	142		−24.9%
2021 (est.)	141	▼	−0.7%
U.S. Decennial Census

As of the census of 2010, there were 189 people, 47 households, and 32 families residing in the town. The population density was 170.7 inhabitants per square mile (65.9/km^{2}). There were 53 housing units at an average density of 83.7 per square mile (32.3/km^{2}). The racial makeup of the town was 95.37% White, 2.78% African American, 0.00% Native American, 0.00% Asian, 0.00% Pacific Islander, 0.00% from other races, and 1.85% from two or more races. 0.00% of the population were Hispanic or Latino of any race.

There were 47 households, out of which 29.8% had children under the age of 18 living with them, 57.4% were married couples living together, 12.8% had a female householder with no husband present, and 29.8% were non-families. 29.8% of all households were made up of individuals, and 19.1% had someone living alone who was 65 years of age or older. The average household size was 2.30 and the average family size was 2.79.

In the town the population was spread out, with 22.2% under the age of 18, 4.6% from 18 to 24, 26.9% from 25 to 44, 30.6% from 45 to 64, and 15.7% who were 65 years of age or older. The median age was 44 years. For every 100 females, there were 92.9 males. For every 100 females age 18 and over, there were 82.6 males.

The median income for a household in the town was $45,000, and the median income for a family was $44,688. Males had a median income of $31,250 versus $25,938 for females. The per capita income for the town was $26,053. 11.2% of the population and 9.7% of families were below the poverty line. Out of the total population, 5.3% of those under the age of 18 and 26.3% of those 65 and older were living below the poverty line.

== Notable people ==
- J. P. Carter, politician (died in Danbury)
- Carl Ray, baseball player
- Grace Taylor Rodenbough, North Carolina state representative
- Ralph James Scott, U.S. representative from North Carolina

== See also ==
- Danbury Township
