= Yadkin Township, Stokes County, North Carolina =

Township in North Carolina, United States

Coordinates: 36.3298682°N 80.3881333°W

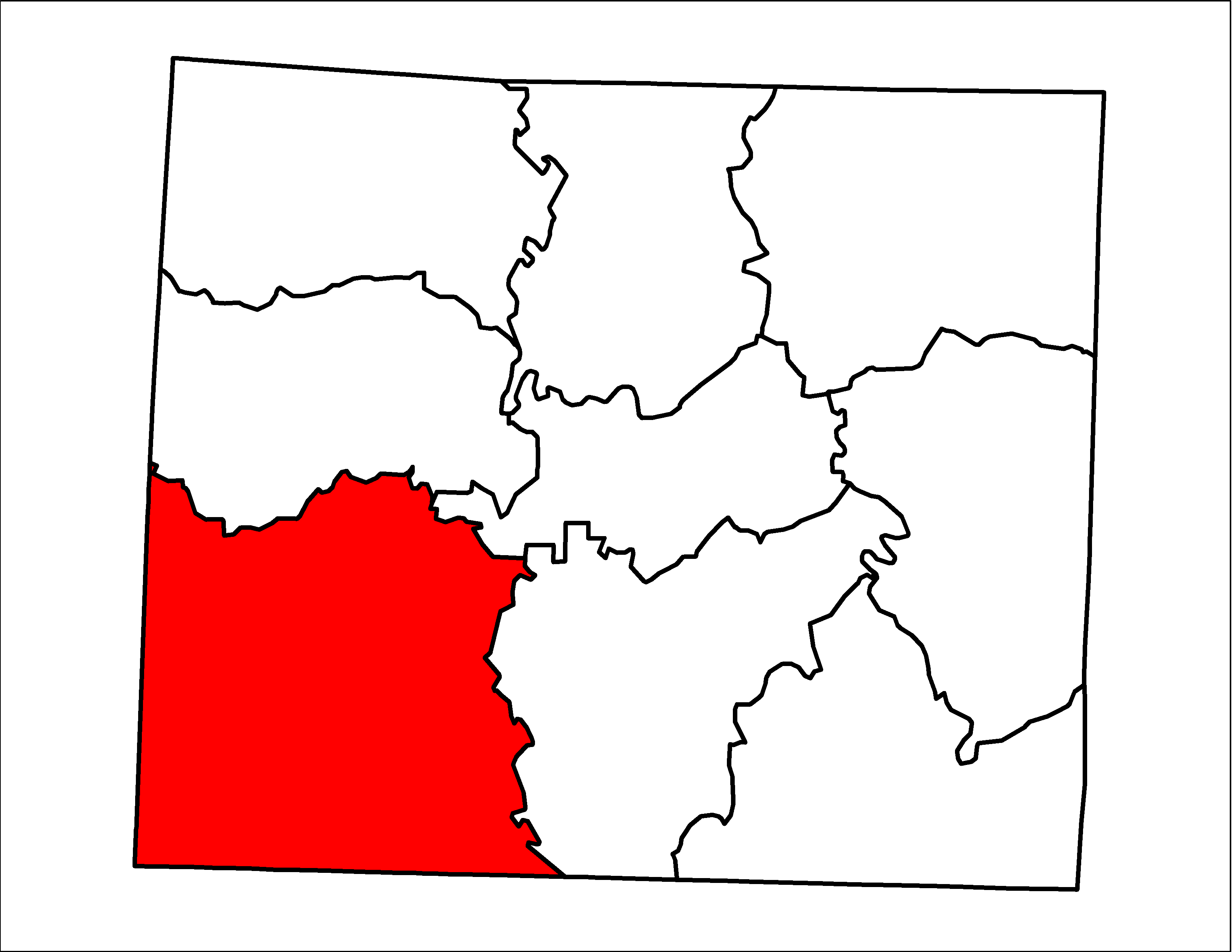
Location of Yadkin Township in Stokes County, N.C.

Yadkin Township is one of nine townships in Stokes County, North Carolina, United States. The township had a population of 19,592 according to the 2000 census and is by the far the largest township by population in Stokes County.

Geographically, Yadkin Township occupies 83 square miles (210 km^{2}) in southwestern Stokes County and is also the largest township by land area in Stokes County. The township's western border is with Surry County and the southern border is with Forsyth County. The incorporated municipality of King is located here as well as parts of the Forsyth County town of Tobaccoville. Additionally, Yadkin Township has many unincorporated communities, including, Chestnut Grove, Dalton, Mountain View, Mount Olive, Pinnacle, Poplar Springs and Volunteer.
