= Pine Hall =

Pine Hall may refer to:

- Pine Hall, North Carolina, an unincorporated community in Stokes County, North Carolina
- Pine Hall (Pine Hall, North Carolina), listed on the NRHP in North Carolina
- Pine Hall (Raleigh, North Carolina), listed on the NRHP in North Carolina
- Pine Hall, Pennsylvania, an unincorporated community in Centre County
