= Peters Creek Township, Stokes County, North Carolina =

Township in Stokes County, North Carolina, U.S.

Peters Creek Township
- Township
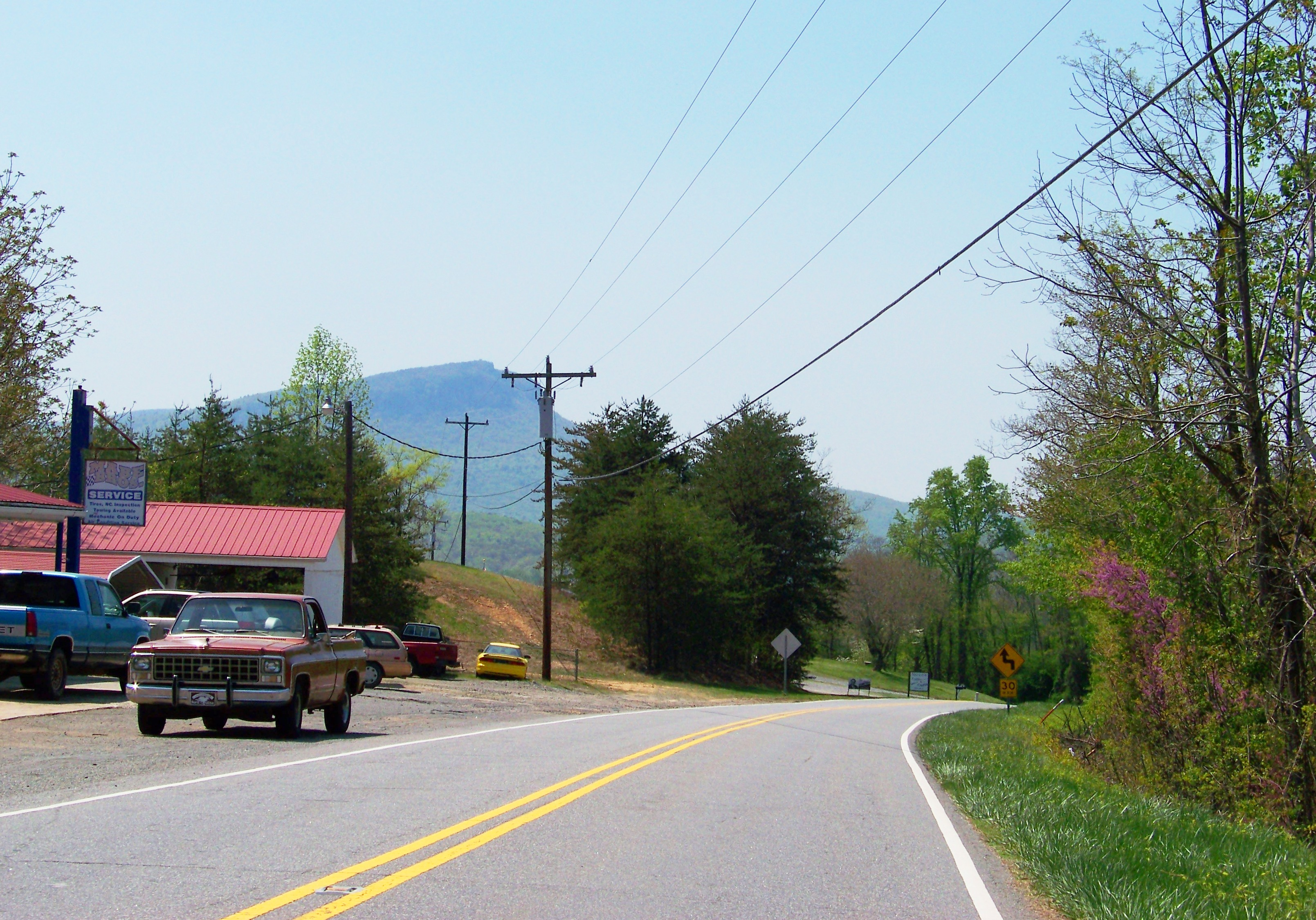
- Roadside scene in Peters Creek Township
- Interactive map of Peters Creek Township
- Coordinates: 36.4789423°N 80.2432839°W
- Country: United States
- State: North Carolina
- County: Stokes

Area
  - Total: 42.4 sq mi (109.7 km^{2})

Population (2000)
  - Total: 2,053

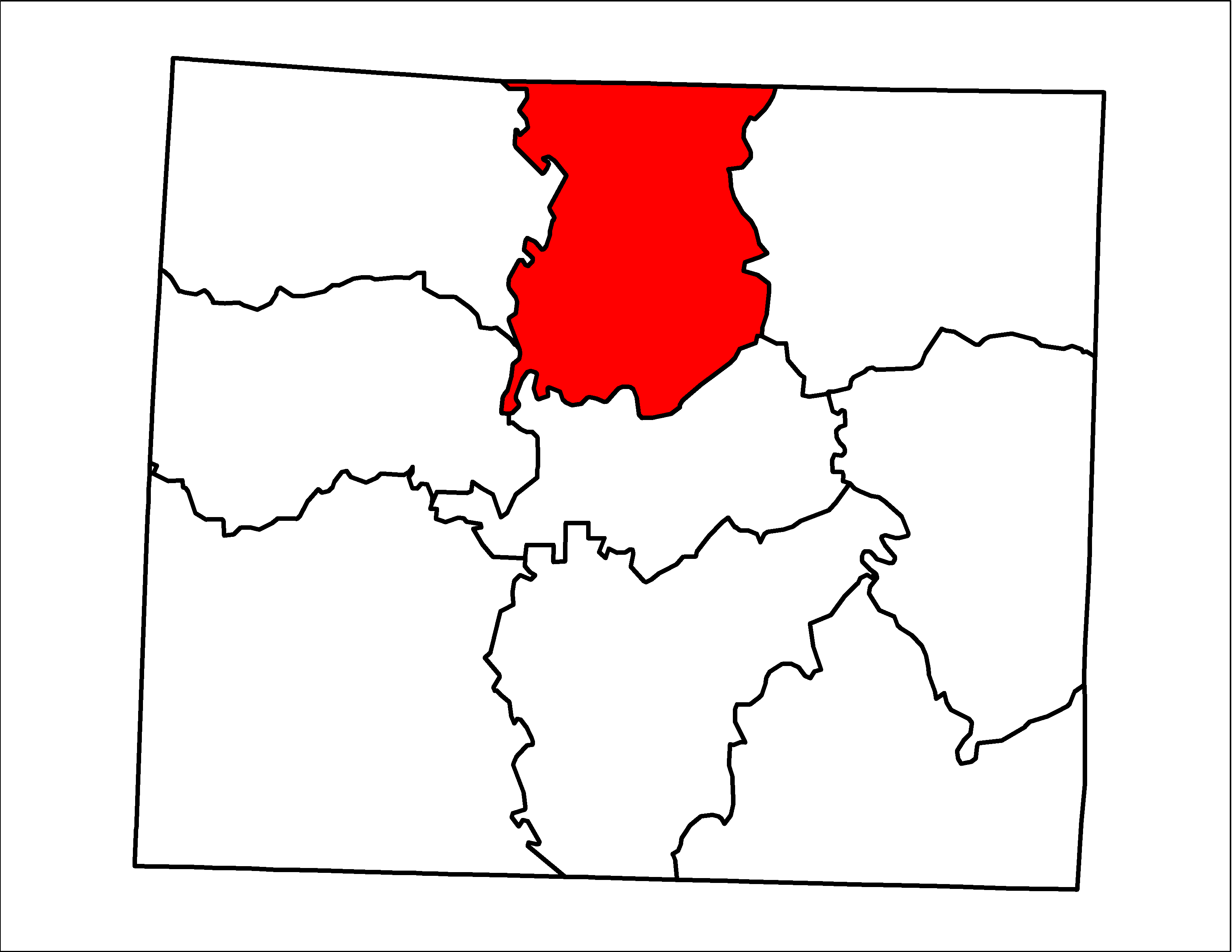
Location of Peters Creek Township in Stokes County, N.C.

Peters Creek Township is one of nine townships in Stokes County, North Carolina, United States. The township had a population of 2,053 according to the 2000 census.

Geographically, Peters Creek Township occupies 42.37 square miles (109.7 km^{2}) in northern Stokes County. The township's northern border is with the state of Virginia. There are no incorporated municipalities in Peters Creek Township but there are several unincorporated communities, including Lawsonville.
