= North Carolina Highway 772 =

State highway in Stokes County, North Carolina, US

North Carolina Highway 772

Route information
- Maintained by NCDOT
- Length: 10.3 mi (16.6 km)
- Existed: 1933–present

Major junctions
- South end: US 311 near Pine Hall
- North end: NC 704 in Prestonville

Location
- Country: United States
- State: North Carolina
- Counties: Stokes

Highway system
- North Carolina Highway System; Interstate; US; State; Scenic
← NC 770	→ I-785

North Carolina Highway 772 (NC 772) is a primary state highway in the U.S. state of North Carolina. NC 772 is a two-lane rural highway that traverses 10.3 miles (16.6 km) from U.S. Route 311 (US 311) north of Pine Hall to NC 704 in Prestonville.

== Route description ==
The highway starts at the intersection of US 311 and Pine Hall Road and then continues north from the intersection. At Madison Road, NC 772 bears left but shortly begins the curve toward the northeast. The road makes another westerly turn at K-Fork Road but again turns back toward the north before reaching NC 704. NC 772 ends at NC 704 south of Sandy Ridge. The road is a rural two lane road throughout the entire length of the highway.

== History ==
Established in 1933 as a new primary routing from Pine Hall, 1.5 miles (2.4 km) south of US 311/NC 77, to NC 704 in Prestonville. In 1978, NC 772 was truncated to its current southern terminus with US 311, leaving its spur into Pine Hall a secondary road.

== Junction list ==
The entire route is in Stokes County.

Location	mi	km	Destinations	Notes
	0.0	0.0	US 311 / Pine Hall Road – Walnut Cove, Madison, Pine Hall	
Prestonville	10.3	16.6	NC 704 – Stuart, Madison	
1.000 mi = 1.609 km; 1.000 km = 0.621 mi
