= Campbell, North Carolina =

Campbell
- Unincorporated community
- Location within the state of North Carolina
- Coordinates: 36°31′40″N 80°14′14″W
- Country: United States
- State: North Carolina
- County: Stokes
- Time zone: UTC-5 (Eastern (EST))
  - Summer (DST): UTC-4 (EDT)
- ZIP code: 27022

Campbell is an unincorporated community in Stokes County, North Carolina, United States.

State highway 704 is the main road in Campbell.

Campbell had a post office in the 19th century, but it closed and the only reminder of its existence is Campbell P.O. Road, which connects State Highways 8 and 704. It now shares a post office and Zip Code, 27022, with Lawsonville, North Carolina.

A rural community, the only employers in Campbell are a few small farms and a local feed store.

South of the hamlet, close to the small city of Danbury, North Carolina, is Hanging Rock State Park.
