= Danbury Township =

Danbury Township may refer to the following townships in the United States:

- Danbury Township, Stokes County, North Carolina
- Danbury Township, Ohio
