= Meadows Township, Stokes County, North Carolina =

Township in Stokes County, North Carolina, U.S.

Coordinates: 36°18′15″N 80°16′32″W

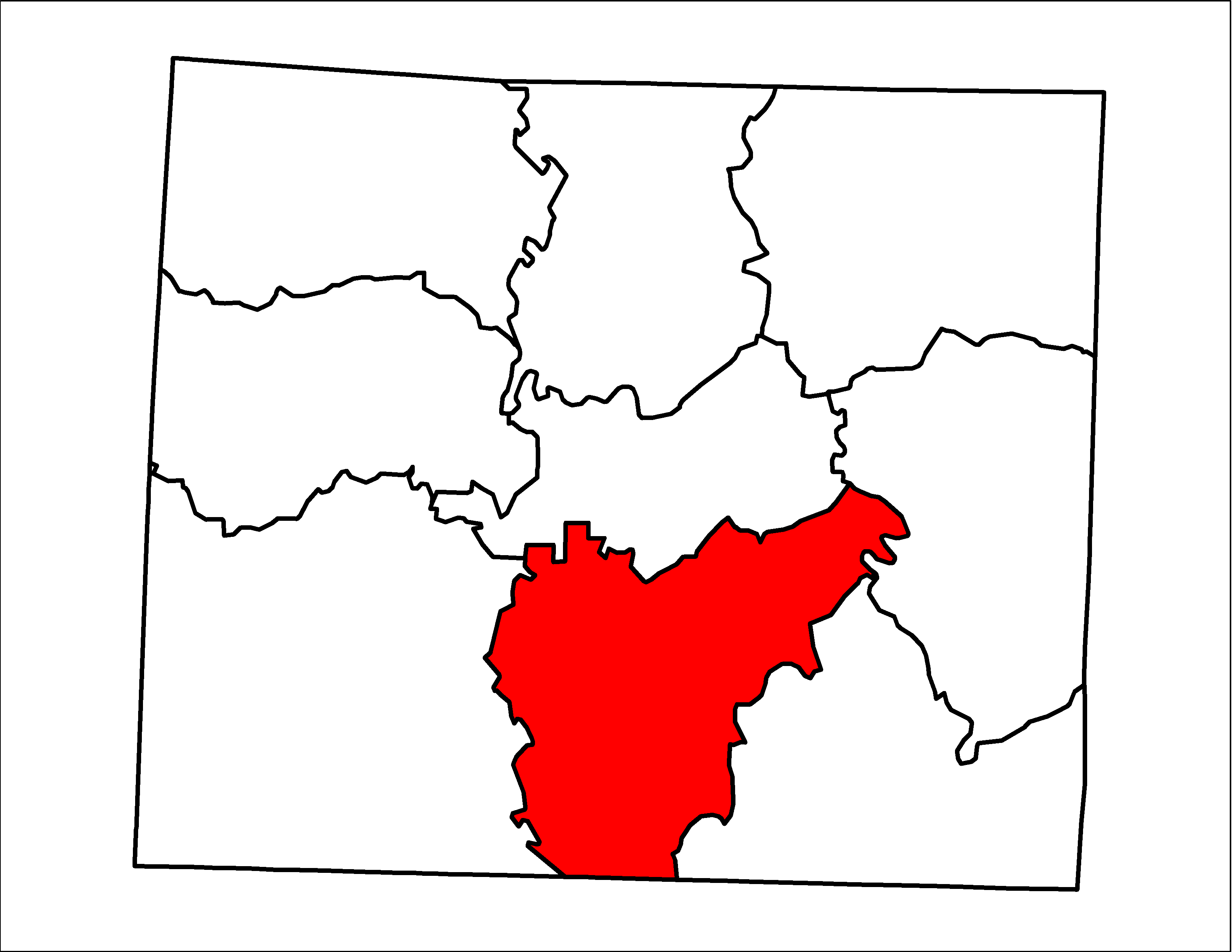
Location of Meadows Township in Stokes County, N.C.

Meadows Township is one of nine townships in Stokes County, North Carolina, United States. The township had a population of 5,279 according to the 2000 census.

Geographically, Meadows Township occupies 53.4 square miles (138 km^{2}) in south-central Stokes County. The township's southern border is with Forsyth County. There are no incorporated municipalities in Meadows Township but there are several unincorporated communities, including Brook Cove and Germanton. Meadows is the home of JT Outfitters, Inc.; a large mail order auto parts house.
