= Dodgetown, North Carolina =

Dodgetown
- Unincorporated community
- Location within the state of North Carolina
- Coordinates: 36°25′57″N 80°6′6″W
- Country: United States
- State: North Carolina
- County: Stokes
- Elevation: 984 ft (300 m)
- Time zone: UTC-5 (Eastern (EST))
  - Summer (DST): UTC-4 (EDT)
- ZIP codes: 27025 & 27052

Dodgetown is an unincorporated community in Stokes County in the U.S. state of North Carolina, a little over a mile south of Prestonville on North Carolina State Highway 772, and about five miles east of the county seat, Danbury.
