= Ceramic (disambiguation) =

A ceramic is an inorganic, nonmetallic solid material comprising metal, nonmetal or metalloid atoms primarily held in ionic and covalent bonds.

Ceramic may also refer to:

== Objects ==
- Ceramic art, art made from ceramic materials
- Ceramic building material, an umbrella term used in archaeology to cover all building materials made from baked clay
- Ceramic capacitor, an electronic component with ceramic dielectric
- Ceramic heater, a space heater with a ceramic heating element
- Ceramic knife, a knife with a ceramic blade
- Ceramic pottery

== Other uses ==
- Ceramic, North Carolina, a ghost town in the US
- SS Ceramic, a British ocean liner, built 1912–1913, sunk 1942 by German torpedo attack

== See also ==
- Ceramic foam, a tough foam made from ceramics
- Ceramic resonator, an electronic component with a piezoelectric ceramic material
- Ceramic membrane, used in liquid filtration
- Ceramic houses, buildings made of an earth mixture high in clay and fired to become ceramic, a technique developed in Iran in the 1970s
- Ceramic engineering, the science and technology of creating ceramic objects
- Ceramic petrography, a laboratory-based scientific archaeological technique in which ceramics and other inorganic materials are examined using polarized light microscopy
- Ceramic chemistry, the chemistry of ceramics and glazes
