= Dillard, North Carolina =

Dillard
- Unincorporated community
- Location within the state of North Carolina
- Coordinates: 36°24′08″N 80°05′37″W
- Country: United States
- State: North Carolina
- County: Stokes
- Elevation: 928 ft (283 m)
- Time zone: UTC-5 (Eastern (EST))
  - Summer (DST): UTC-4 (EDT)
- GNIS feature ID: 984183

Dillard is an unincorporated community in Stokes County, North Carolina. The center of Dillard is where Highway 772 and Dillard Road cross. Nearby communities include Pine Hall, Walnut Cove, Madison, Prestonville, and Danbury.
