= Snow Creek Township, Stokes County, North Carolina =

Snow Creek Township, Stokes County, N.C.
- Township
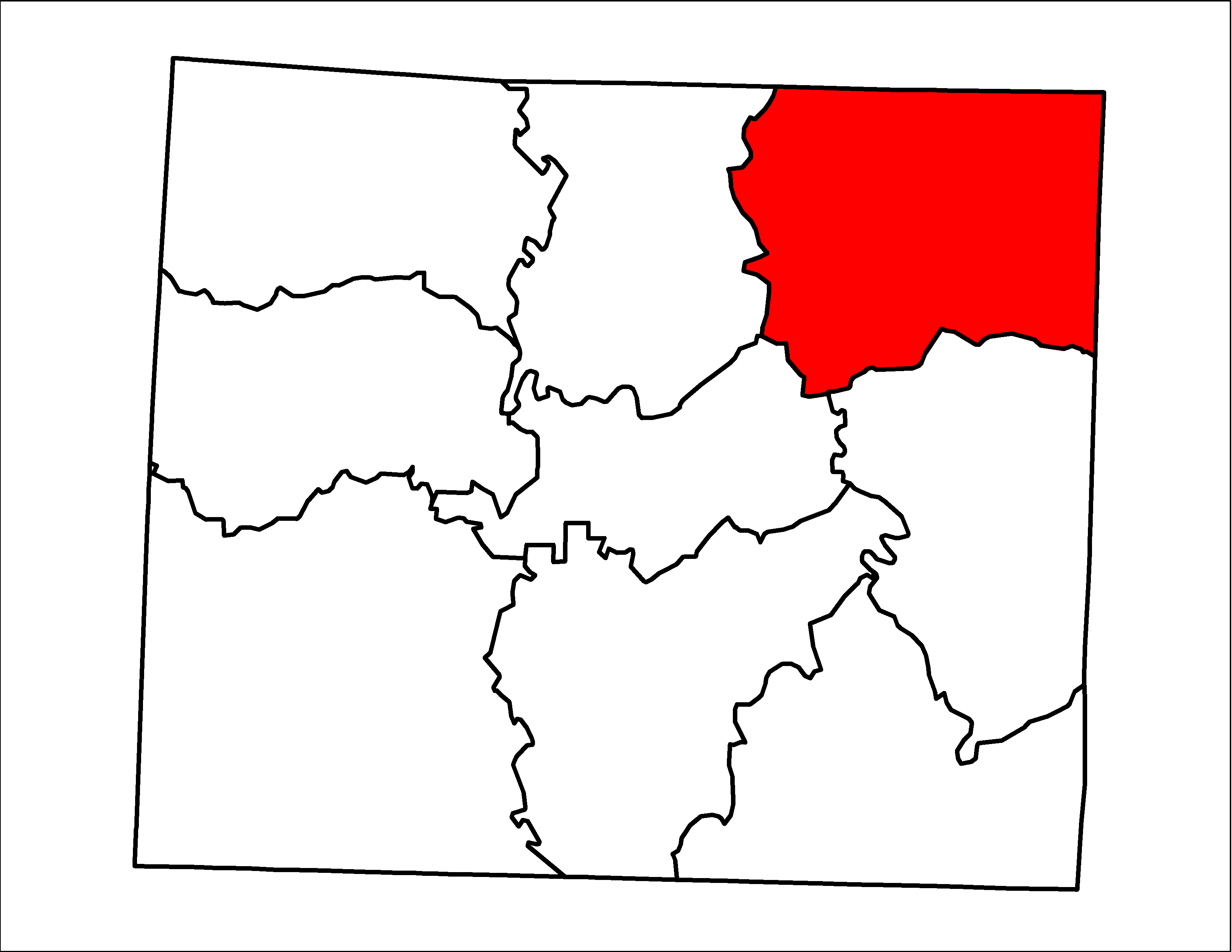
- Location in Stokes County, North Carolina

- Location of Snow Creek Township within North Carolina
- Coordinates: 36°31′6.95″N 80°4′33″W
- Country: United States
- State: North Carolina
- County: Stokes

Area
  - Total: 55.9 sq mi (144.7 km^{2})

Population (2000)
  - Total: 2,653
- Time zone: UTC-5 (Eastern)
  - Summer (DST): UTC-4 (Eastern)
- Area code: 336

Snow Creek Township is one of nine townships in Stokes County, North Carolina, United States. The township had a population of 2,653 according to the 2000 census.

Geographically, Snow Creek Township occupies 55.87 square miles (144.7 km^{2}) in northeastern Stokes County. The township's eastern border is with Rockingham County and the northern border is with the state of Virginia. There are no incorporated municipalities in Snow Creek Township but there are several unincorporated communities, including Delta, Oak Ridge, and Sandy Ridge.
