= Belews Creek Power Station =

Coal-fired power station in Stokes County, North Carolina

Belews Creek Steam Station
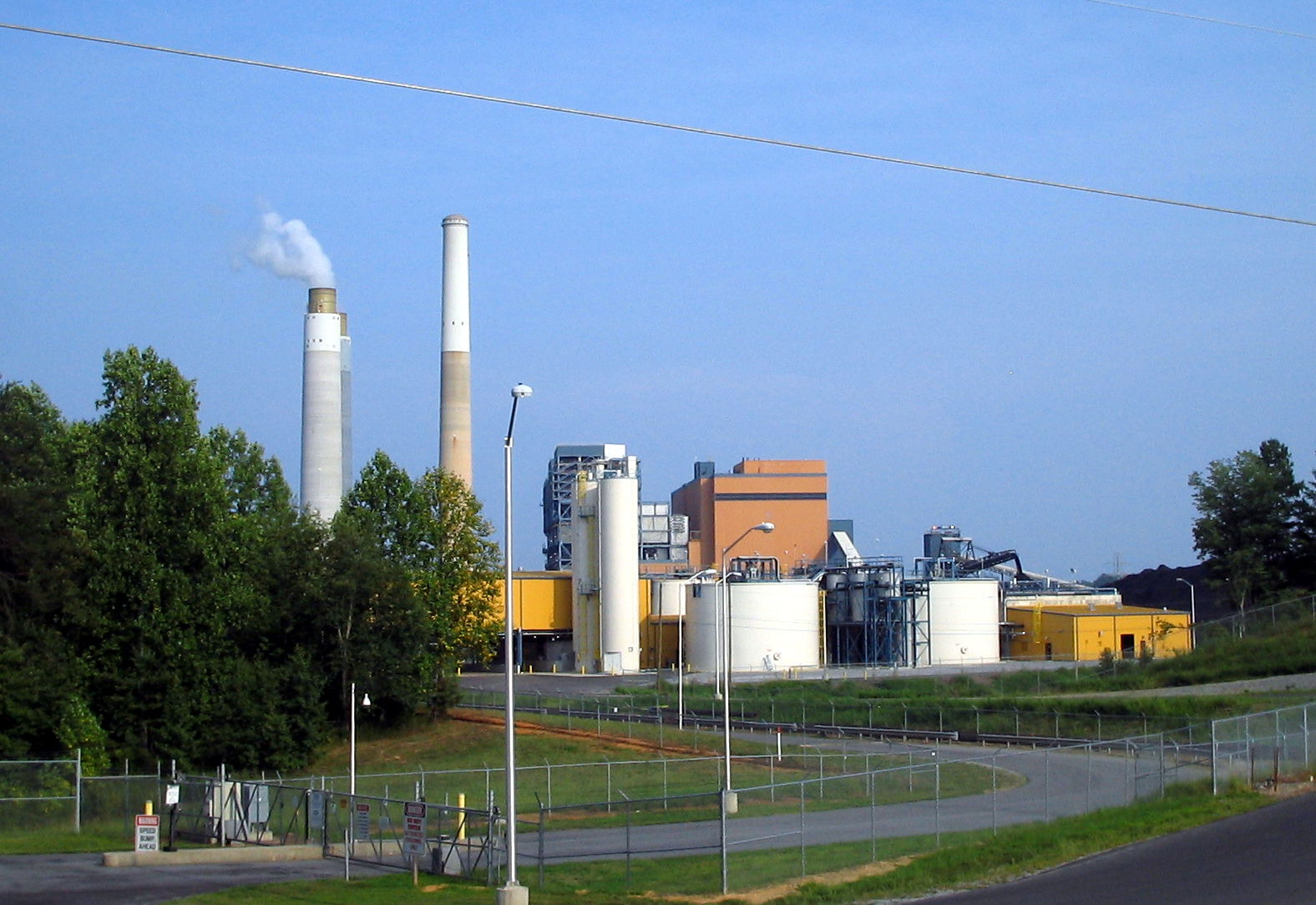
- Belews Creek Steam Station
- Country: USA
- Location: Stokes County, North Carolina
- Coordinates: 36°16′53″N 80°3′37″W
- Status: Operational
- Owner: Duke Energy

Thermal power station
- Primary fuel: Coal

Power generation
- Units operational: 2 × 1,120 MW
- Nameplate capacity: 2,240 MW
- Annual net output: 8,021 MWh (2018)

Belews Creek Steam Station is a 2.24-GW, two-unit coal-fired generating facility located on Belews Lake in Stokes County, North Carolina. It is Duke Energy’s largest coal-burning power plant in the Carolinas and consistently ranks among the most efficient coal facilities in the United States. During 2006, it was the fifth most efficient coal power plant in the United States with a heat rate of 9,023 Btu/kWh (37.8% conversion efficiency). The remaining 62.2% of energy released by the burning coal is in the form of heat. It is dumped into Belews Lake, a man-made lake created by Duke Power for cooling water purposes in the early 1970s. In 2008, it was the #1 most efficient coal power plant in the United States with a heat rate of 9,204 British thermal units per kilowatt-hour (2.697 kWh/kWh) or 37.1% conversion efficiency. In 2018 a complete redesign of the back-pass on Unit-1 significantly boosted this efficiency, ranking it the 2nd most efficient coal-fired power plant in the world.

The plant consists of two nearly identical units, launched into operation in 1974 and 1975. Each furnace, a Babcock & Wilcox boiler, heats steam to 1,000 °F (538 °C) in both the secondary superheater and reheater sections. The boilers are supercritical units, operating up to 3,400 pounds per square inch (230 atm) of pressure. All four generators (two low pressure generators and two high pressure/intermediate pressure generators) are Westinghouse generators. The low pressure, intermediate pressure and high pressure steam turbines were originally Westinghouse units, but were replaced over time with Alstom steam-path upgraded components. The turbine valves are the originally installed Westinghouse equipment.

The plant employs multiple pollution control systems, including a selective catalytic reducer which removes nitrogen oxides, an electrostatic precipitator which removes fly ash, and low NO_{x} burners in the boiler. The plant has completed a $500 million flue-gas desulfurization project which came online during the beginning of 2008. This project has reduced the plant's sulfur dioxide emissions by 95%.

== Retirement ==
The plant was originally scheduled to shut down in 2035, but was delayed to 2040 in October 2025 due to increased power demand from AI, and changes in federal policy. This was because Donald Trump has prioritized fossil fuels in the U.S. The old plant is to be replaced with modular nuclear reactors (SMR), and non-light-water reactors (NLWR), which is planned to come as a replacement as early as 2037. This was mostly confirmed after they filed for an Early Site Permit (ESP) to the US nuclear regulatory commission (NRC) while a technology can be selected later in the development process. Duke energy said that its application will be four SMRs and two NLWRs. They are aiming for the first reactor to come online by 2036.

== See also ==
- List of largest power stations in the United States
