= Big Creek Township, Stokes County, North Carolina =

Township in Stokes County, North Carolina, U.S.

Coordinates: 36.4978583°N 80.3435908°W

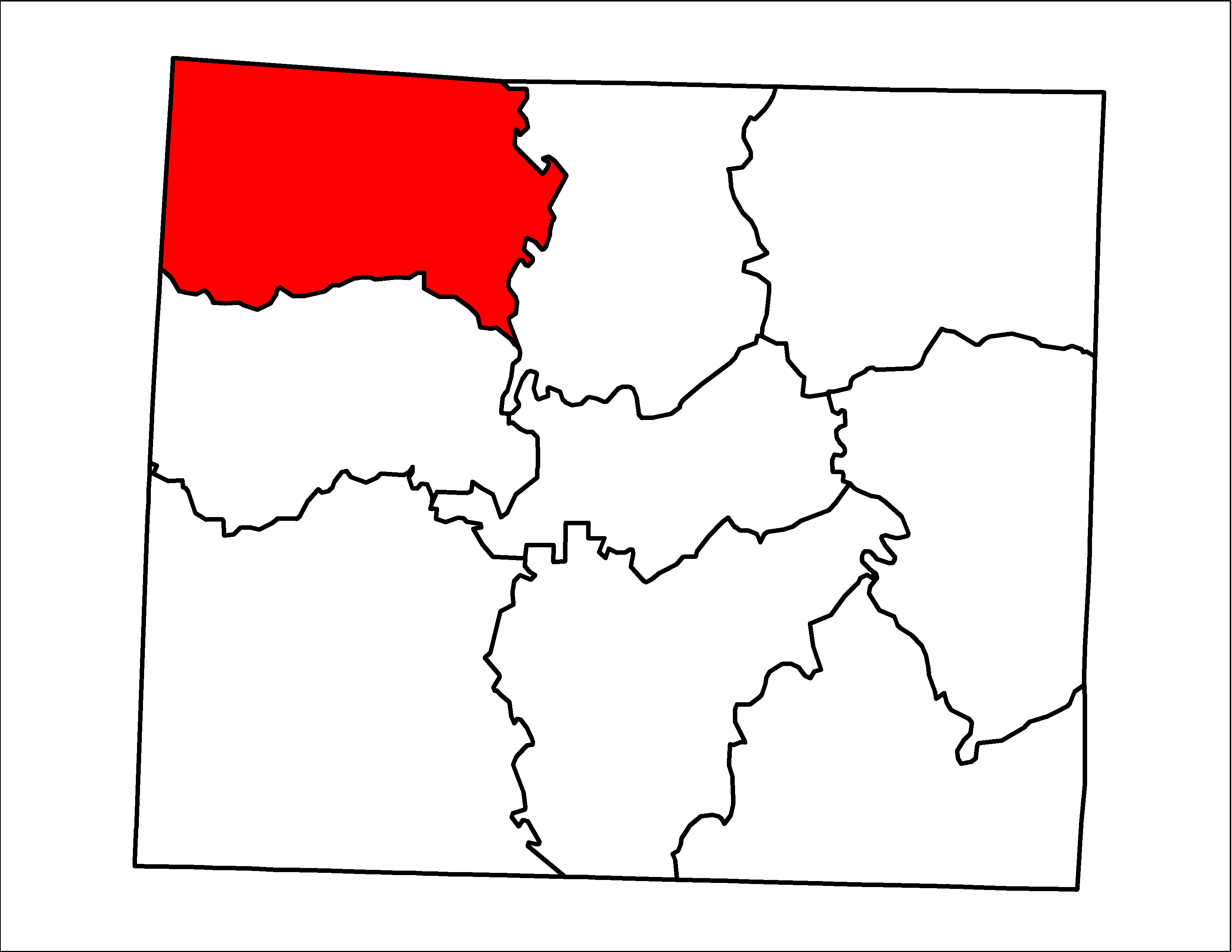
Location of Big Creek Township in Stokes County, N.C.

Big Creek Township is one of nine townships in Stokes County, North Carolina, United States. The township had a population of 2,094 in 2024.

Geographically, Big Creek Township occupies 50.06 square miles (129.7 km^{2}) in northwestern Stokes County. The township's western border is with Surry County and the northern border is with the state of Virginia. There are no incorporated municipalities in Big Creek Township but there are several unincorporated communities, including Asbury, Collinstown and Francisco.
