= Rosebud, North Carolina =

Rosebud
- Unincorporated community
- Location within the state of North Carolina
- Coordinates: 36°18′25″N 80°10′51″W
- Country: United States
- State: North Carolina
- County: Stokes
- Elevation: 791 ft (241 m)
- Time zone: UTC-5 (Eastern (EST))
  - Summer (DST): UTC-4 (EDT)
- ZIP code: 27052
- GNIS feature ID: 993706

Rosebud is an unincorporated community in Stokes County, North Carolina, United States, approximately two miles west-northwest of Walnut Cove.
