= Quaker Gap Township, Stokes County, North Carolina =

Township in Stokes County, North Carolina, U.S.

Coordinates: 36°26′26″N 80°21′54″W

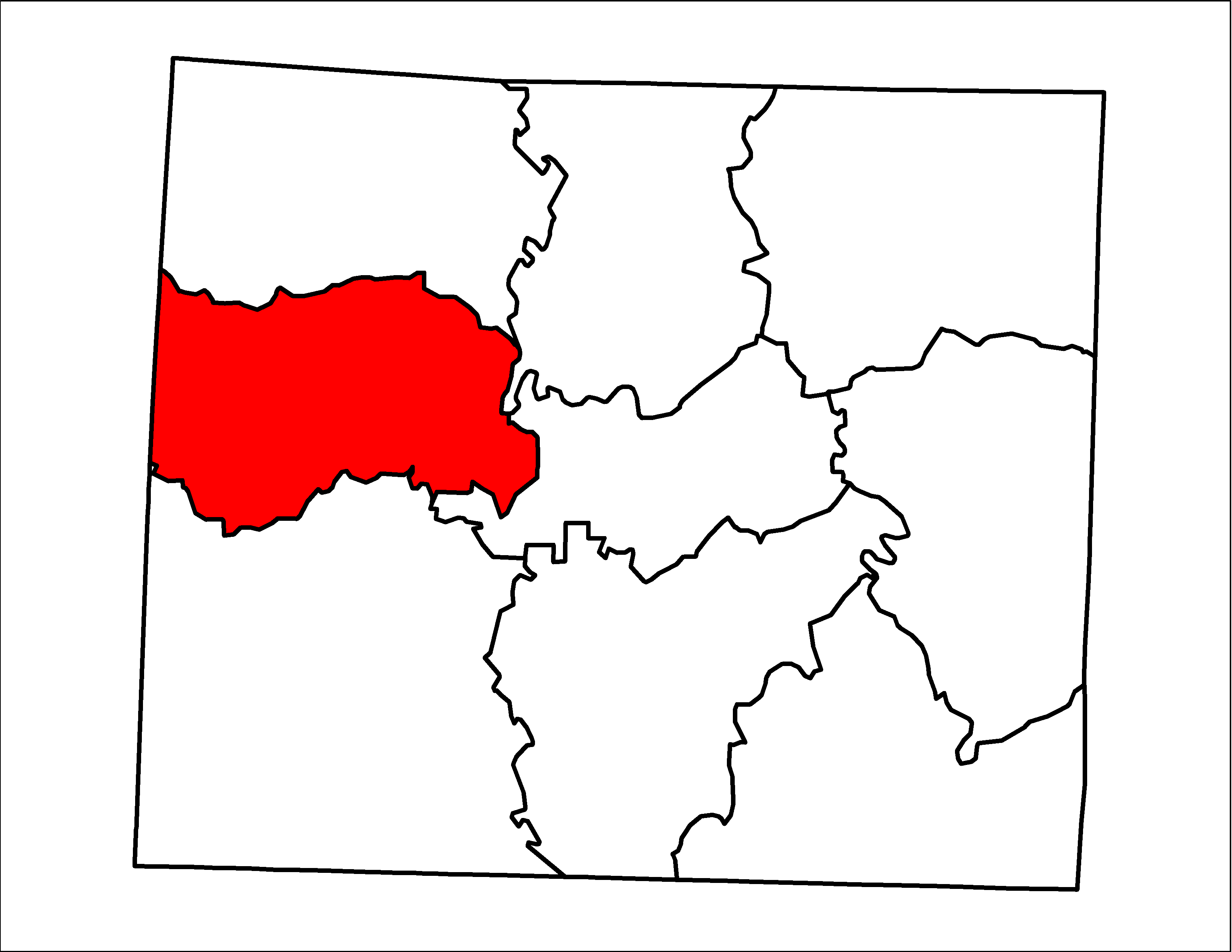
Location of Quaker Gap Township in Stokes County, N.C.

Quaker Gap Township is one of nine townships in Stokes County, North Carolina, United States.

Geographically, Quaker Gap Township occupies 44.91 square miles (116.3 km^{2}) in western Stokes County. The township's western border is with Surry County. There are no incorporated municipalities in Quaker Gap Township but there are several unincorporated communities located here.

== Demographics ==
The township had a population of 2,796 according to the 2000 census. The township had a population of 2,096 according to the 2020 census.
