= Prestonville, North Carolina =

Prestonville
- Unincorporated community
- Location within the state of North Carolina
- Coordinates: 36°27′27″N 80°5′53″W
- Country: United States
- State: North Carolina
- County: Stokes
- Time zone: UTC-5 (Eastern (EST))
  - Summer (DST): UTC-4 (EDT)
- ZIP codes: 27025 & 27046
- Area code: 336

Prestonville is an unincorporated community in Stokes County, North Carolina, United States, approximately five miles northeast of county seat Danbury, at the junction of State Highways 704 and 772. Nearby communities include Dillard, Sandy Ridge, Stoneville, and Danbury.
