= Ceramic, North Carolina =

Ceramic
- Ghost town
- Location within the state of North Carolina
- Coordinates: 36°18′24″N 80°5′8″W
- Country: United States
- State: North Carolina
- County: Stokes
- Time zone: UTC-5 (Eastern (EST))
  - Summer (DST): UTC-4 (EDT)
- GNIS feature ID: 1023600

Ceramic is a ghost town in Stokes County, North Carolina, United States, approximately ten miles southeast of the county seat of Danbury, near Belews Lake.

Ceramic as a community ceased to exist at least 6 decades ago. The community was started by a ceramic pipe and drain tile manufacturing company, presently the "Pine Hall" brick company. Only remnants of the factory exist. It appears that fire may have caused its demise. The huge clay pits are surrounded by overgrown trees and underbrush and are nearly impossible to find. The only residents are small game and coyotes.
