= Sauratown Township, Stokes County, North Carolina =

Township in Stokes County, North Carolina

Coordinates: 36.2962698°N 80.109357°W

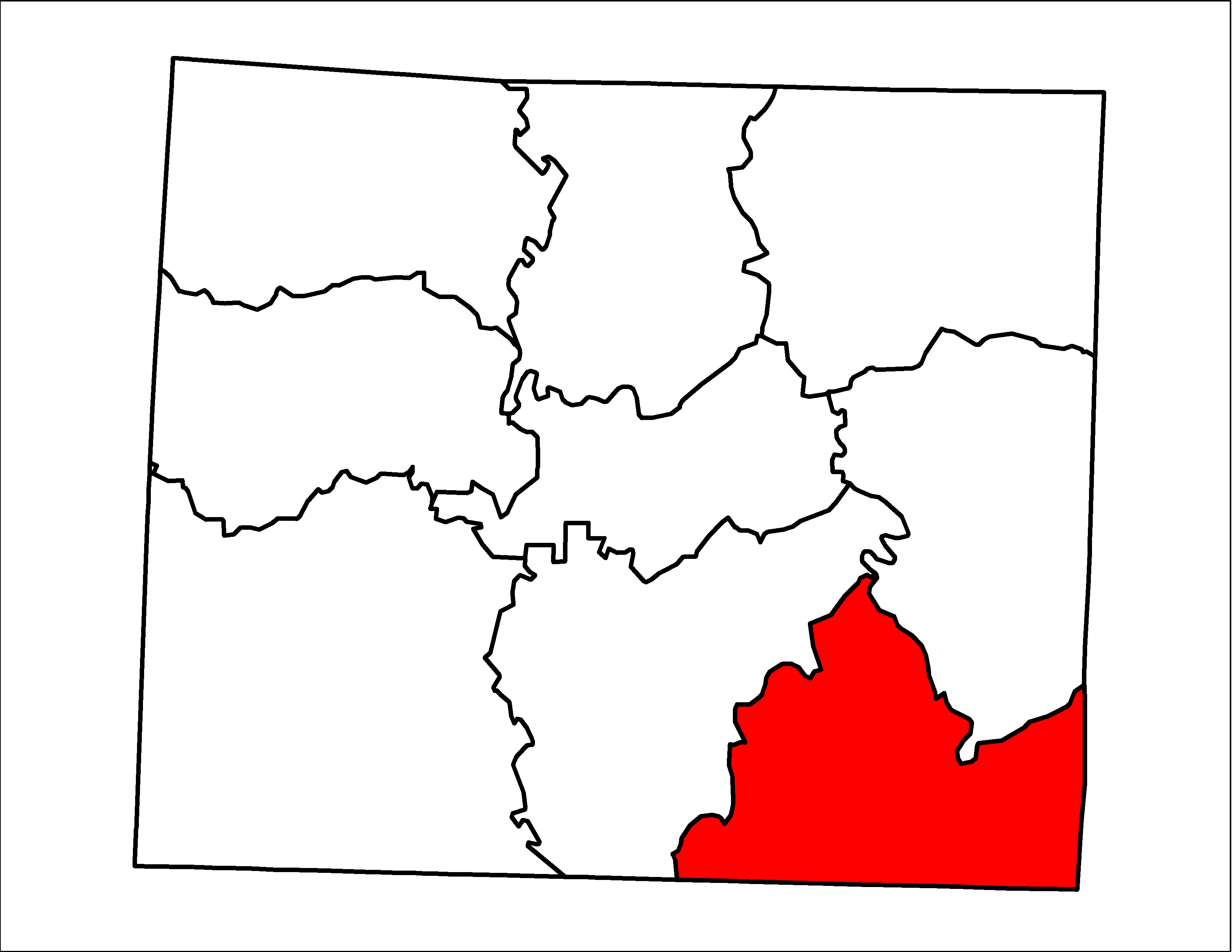
Location of Sauratown Township in Stokes County, N.C.

Sauratown Township is one of nine townships in Stokes County, North Carolina, United States. The township had a population of 5,560 according to the 2000 census.

Geographically, Sauratown Township occupies 46.35 square miles (120.0 km^{2}) in central Stokes County. The township's southern border is with Forsyth County and the eastern border is with Rockingham County. The only incorporated municipality within Sauratown Township is Walnut Cove. There are also several unincorporated communities located here.
