= Old Richmond Schoolhouse and Gymnasium =

Historic school building in North Carolina, United States

- U.S. National Register of Historic Places
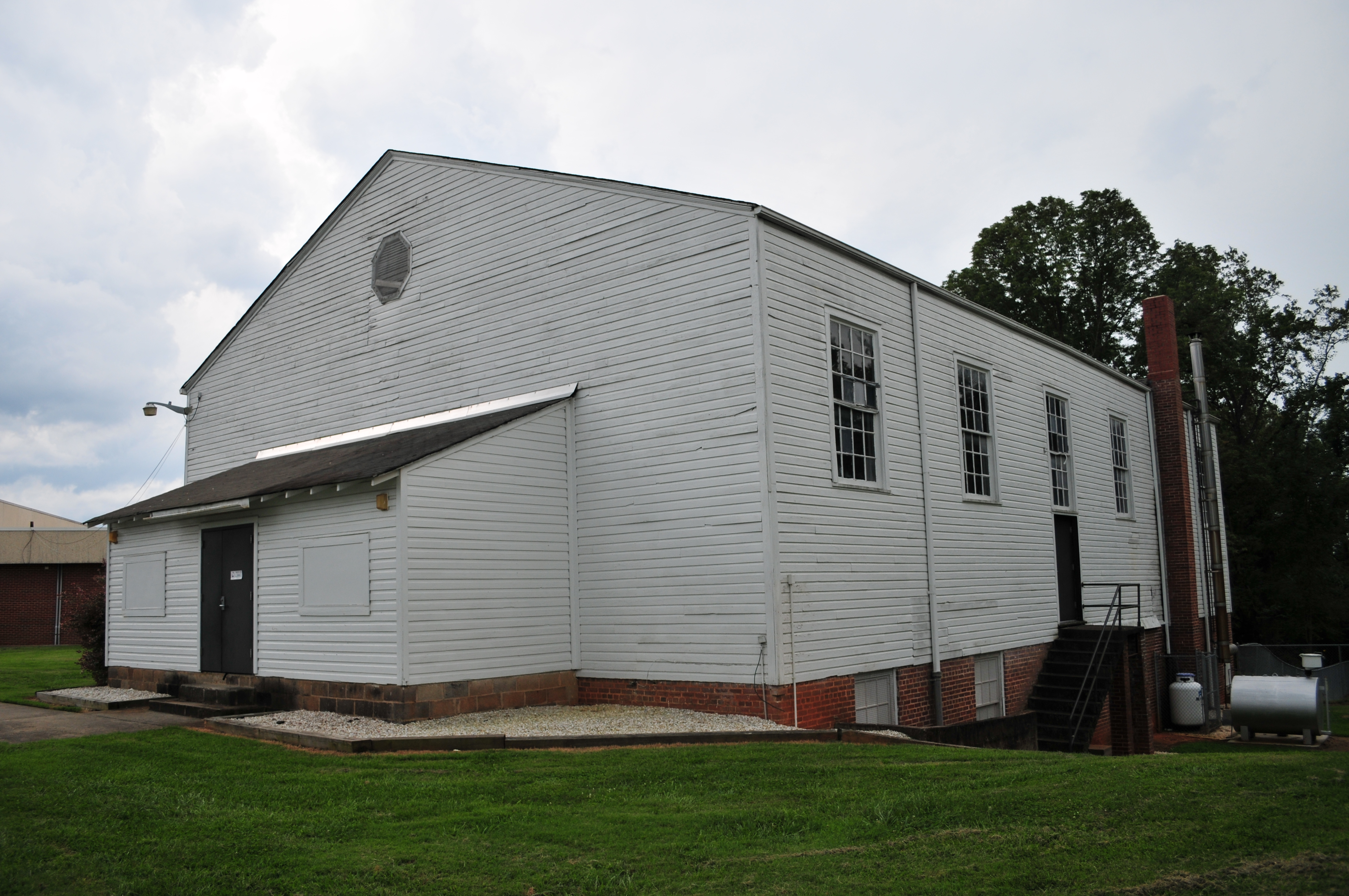
- Old Richmond Schoolhouse and Gymnasium, August 2013

- Location within North Carolina Location within the United States
- Location: 6315 and 6375 Tobaccoville Rd., near Tobaccoville, North Carolina
- Coordinates: 36°12′17″N 80°23′26″W
- Area: 1.7 acres (0.69 ha)
- Built: 1914
- NRHP reference No.: 08001362
- Added to NRHP: January 21, 2009

Old Richmond Schoolhouse and Gymnasium is a historic school building and gymnasium located near Tobaccoville, Forsyth County, North Carolina. The Old Richmond Schoolhouse was built about 1914, and is a one-story, three-bay, rectangular frame building with a projecting center bay. It sits on a brick pier foundation and has a side gable roof with exposed rafter ends. The gymnasium was built about 1940 with fund by the Works Progress Administration, and is a tall one-story, weatherboard-clad frame building with a gable roof. The Old Richmond Schoolhouse was restored in 1980 for use as a museum.

It was listed on the National Register of Historic Places in 2009.
