= Beaver Island Township, Stokes County, North Carolina =

Township in Stokes County, North Carolina, U.S.

Coordinates: 36.3900393°N 80.0758425°W

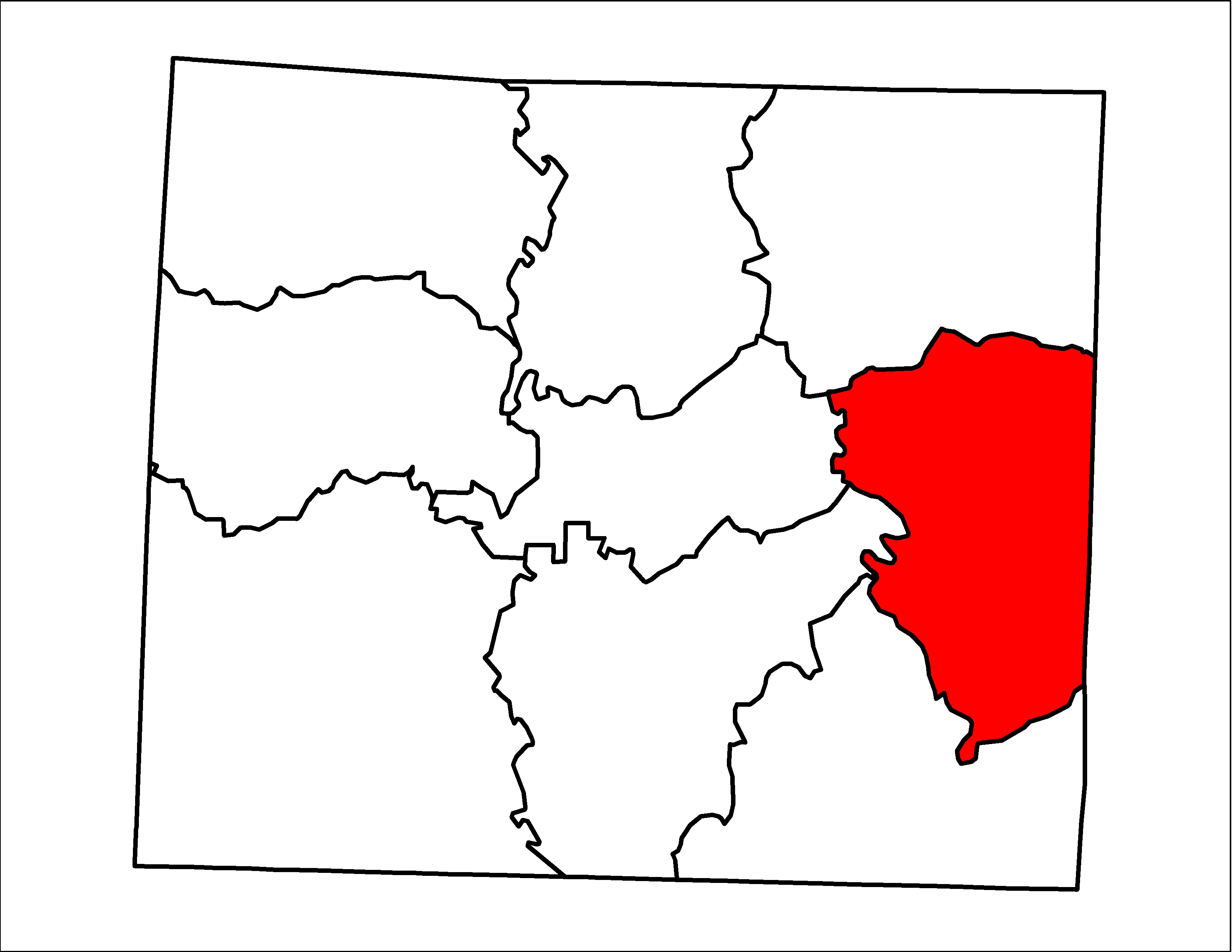
Location of Beaver Island Township in Stokes County, N.C.

Beaver Island Township is one of nine townships in Stokes County, North Carolina, United States. The township had a population of 3,565 according to the 2000 census.

Geographically, Beaver Island Township occupies 47.66 square miles (123.4 km^{2}) in eastern Stokes County. There are no incorporated municipalities located inside Beaver Island Township. The township's eastern border is with Rockingham County, North Carolina.
