= Aarons Corner, North Carolina =

Aarons Corner
- Unincorporated community
- Location within the state of North Carolina Aarons Corner (the United States)
- Coordinates: 36°32′17″N 80°17′45″W
- Country: United States
- State: North Carolina
- County: Stokes
- Time zone: UTC-5 (Eastern (EST))
  - Summer (DST): UTC-4 (EDT)
- ZIP codes: 27022 & 27053

Aarons Corner is an unincorporated community in Stokes County, North Carolina, United States, near the Virginia border. It was named after a local church. There is a cemetery called the Aarons Corner Primitive Baptist Church Cemetery.

The Aaron family settled the area sometime before the 1760s. At one time it had a store and a post office.
