= Brown Mountain, North Carolina =

Unincorporated community in North Carolina, US

Coordinates: 36.4540267°N 80.3392213°W

Brown Mountain is an unincorporated community in Stokes County, North Carolina, United States. Located north of the Sauratown Mountain range with a peak of 1580 feet above sea level, the Brown Mountain community lays claim to one of only two privately owned "peaks" in Stokes County; all others are within the NC State Park system. Sauratown Mountain, Stokes County's other private peak, allows no public access to its peak due to being a major radio communications site. Visitors to the top of Brown Mountain via Vineyard Road can enjoy unrestricted views of Virginia's Blue Ridge Mountains to the north; the Sauratown Mountain range and Hanging Rock State Park to the south and southeast, respectively; and Surry County's Pilot Mountain to the southwest.

Brown Mountain has a variety of notable landmarks including Brown Mountain Baptist Church, a structure built entirely of locally acquired rock, and Nancy Reynolds School, an elementary (K-5th grade) public school primarily built with funding from the estate of R.J. Reynolds of R.J. Reynolds Tobacco Company.

In 1923, the newly formed Reynolds Foundation fully financed the construction of Nancy Reynolds Memorial School built at the birthplace of his and Will Reynolds' mother, Nancy Jane Cox Reynolds, in the Brown Mountain community. In 1930, the Reynolds Foundation paid for the construction of two wings adjoining the original building. During the Depression, Will Reynolds covered the costs for an additional month of school in order for Nancy Reynolds to become accredited. In the 1950s, the foundation financed and built the school's freestanding gymnasium and built and equipped its large agricultural building. A memorial gift that still provides for the school today is an endowment set up after the death of Kate Bitting Reynolds, Will's wife, with the yearly dividends to be used solely for the upkeep of grounds, exterior beautification projects and playground equipment. As of 2008, the endowment's total value is now more than three-quarters of a million dollars and easily supports its intended use.
