= Danbury Township, Stokes County, North Carolina =

Township in Stokes County, North Carolina, U.S.

Coordinates: 36°23′39″N 80°12′56″W

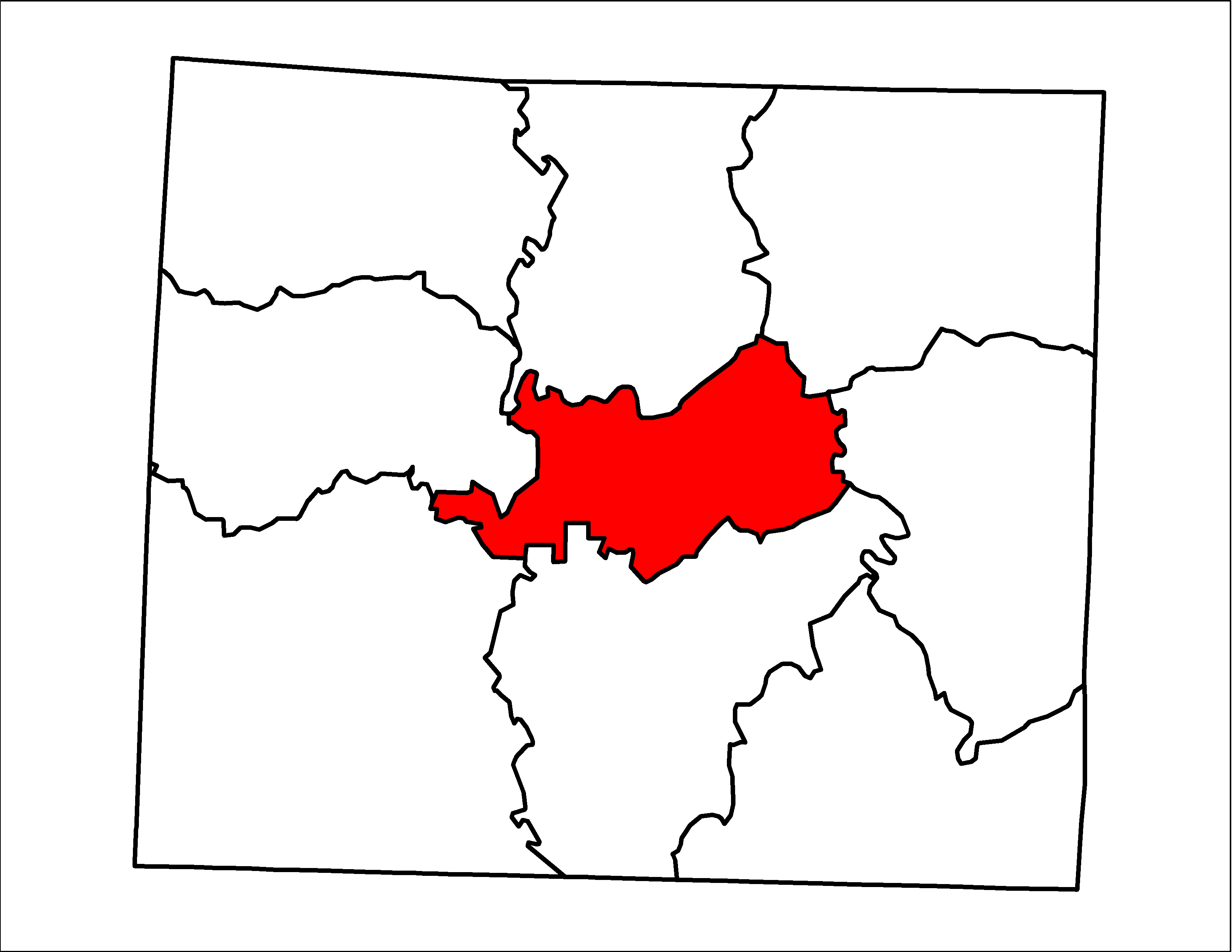
Location of Danbury Township in Stokes County, N.C.

Danbury Township is one of nine townships in Stokes County, North Carolina, United States. The township had a population of 1,229 according to the 2000 census.

Geographically, Danbury Township occupies 32.04 square miles (83.0 km^{2}) in central Stokes County. The only incorporated municipality within Danbury Township is the Town of Danbury, the county seat of Stokes County. However, there are also unincorporated communities located here, including Hartman.
