= Quaker Gap, North Carolina =

Quaker Gap
- Unincorporated community
- Location within the state of North Carolina
- Coordinates: 36°21′20″N 80°17′16″W
- Country: United States
- State: North Carolina
- County: Stokes
- Elevation: 1,089 ft (332 m)
- Time zone: UTC-5 (Eastern (EST))
  - Summer (DST): UTC-4 (EDT)
- ZIP code: 27021
- GNIS feature ID: 992931

Quaker Gap is an unincorporated community in Stokes County, North Carolina, United States, approximately five miles southwest of county seat Danbury, near Hanging Rock State Park.

There are a few amenities in Quaker Gap, including a Baptist Church, event center and wedding hall, and a cemetery.
