= Tobaccoville, North Carolina =

- Village
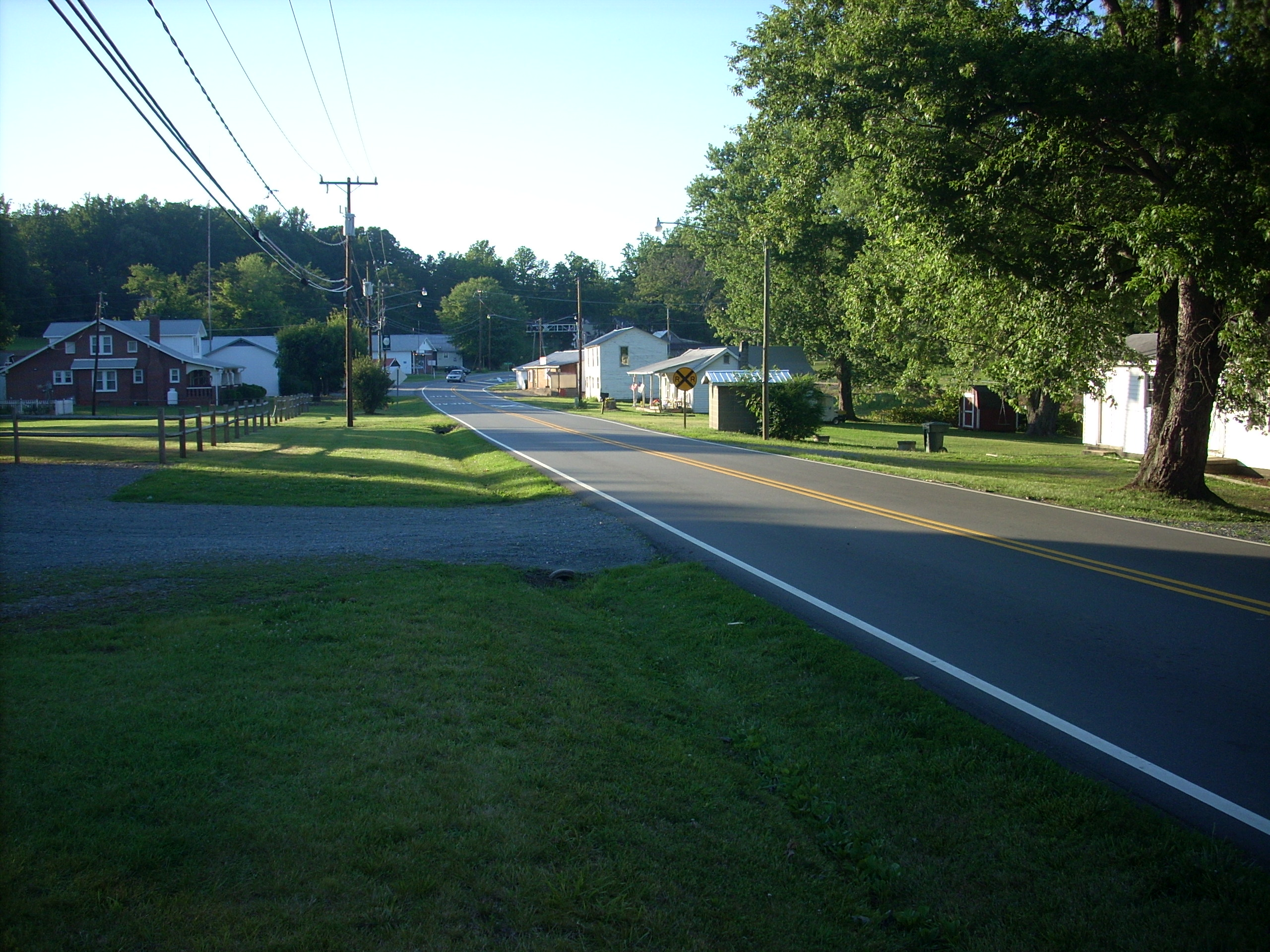
- Doral Drive in Tobaccoville

- Location in Forsyth County and the state of North Carolina.
- Coordinates: 36°13′32″N 80°21′33″W
- Country: United States
- State: North Carolina
- Counties: Forsyth, Stokes
- Founded: 1879
- Incorporated: 1991
- Named for: Chewing-tobacco factory built there

Government
  - Mayor: Myron Marion

Area
  - Total: 7.68 sq mi (19.89 km^{2})
  - Land: 7.65 sq mi (19.81 km^{2})
  - Water: 0.027 sq mi (0.07 km^{2})
- Elevation: 1,011 ft (308 m)

Population (2020)
  - Total: 2,578
  - Density: 337.0/sq mi (130.11/km^{2})
- Time zone: UTC-5 (Eastern (EST))
  - Summer (DST): UTC-4 (EDT)
- ZIP code: 27050
- Area code: 336
- FIPS code: 37-67720
- GNIS feature ID: 2407562
- Website: tobaccovillenc.org

Tobaccoville is a village in Forsyth and Stokes counties in the U.S. state of North Carolina. The population was 2,209 at the 2020 census. While a Tobaccoville post office was established in 1879, the village was not incorporated until 1991, as a defense against forced annexation of the area by the nearby city of King.

== History ==
The Old Richmond Schoolhouse and Gymnasium was listed on the National Register of Historic Places in 2009.

== Geography ==
Tobaccoville is located in northwestern Forsyth County. Small portions of the village limits extend north into Stokes County. The village is 15 miles (24 km) northwest of downtown Winston-Salem.

According to the United States Census Bureau, the village has a total area of 7.7 square miles (19.9 km^{2}), of which 0.027 square miles (0.07 km^{2}), or 0.37%, is water.

== Demographics ==
Historical population
Census	Pop.	Note	%±
2000	2,209		—
2010	2,441		10.5%
2020	2,578		5.6%
2021 (est.)	2,622	▲	1.7%
U.S. Decennial Census

=== 2020 census ===
Tobaccoville racial composition
Race	Number	Percentage
White (non-Hispanic)	1,555	60.35%
Black or African American (non-Hispanic)	771	29.91%
Native American	3	0.12%
Asian	16	0.62%
Other/Mixed	114	4.42%
Hispanic or Latino	118	4.58%

As of the 2020 census, Tobaccoville had a population of 2,578. The median age was 45.8 years. 19.4% of residents were under the age of 18 and 22.4% of residents were 65 years of age or older. For every 100 females there were 99.7 males, and for every 100 females age 18 and over there were 96.3 males age 18 and over.

9.9% of residents lived in urban areas, while 90.1% lived in rural areas.

There were 1,081 households in Tobaccoville, of which 29.7% had children under the age of 18 living in them. Of all households, 56.0% were married-couple households, 16.7% were households with a male householder and no spouse or partner present, and 22.2% were households with a female householder and no spouse or partner present. About 23.9% of all households were made up of individuals and 11.7% had someone living alone who was 65 years of age or older. There were 762 families residing in the village.

There were 1,157 housing units, of which 6.6% were vacant. The homeowner vacancy rate was 2.0% and the rental vacancy rate was 6.5%.

=== 2000 census ===
As of the census of 2000, there were 2,209 people, 889 households, and 661 families residing in the village. The population density was 311.6 inhabitants per square mile (120.3/km^{2}). There were 944 housing units at an average density of 133.1 per square mile (51.4/km^{2}). The racial makeup of the village was 65.07% White, 34.16% African American, 0.18% Asian, 0.14% from other races, and 0.45% from two or more races. Hispanic or Latino of any race were 0.77% of the population.

There were 889 households, out of which 32.6% had children under the age of 18 living with them, 65.0% were married couples living together, 7.1% had a female householder with no husband present, and 25.6% were non-families. 21.6% of all households were made up of individuals, and 8.0% had someone living alone who was 65 years of age or older. The average household size was 2.48 and the average family size was 2.89.

In the village, the population was spread out, with 24.0% under the age of 18, 6.5% from 18 to 24, 31.6% from 25 to 44, 27.3% from 45 to 64, and 10.6% who were 65 years of age or older. The median age was 39 years. For every 100 females, there were 97.1 males. For every 100 females age 18 and over, there were 93.9 males.

The median income for a household in the village was $48,233, and the median income for a family was $56,034. Males had a median income of $34,554 versus $27,288 for females. The per capita income for the village was $21,620. About 3.4% of families and 5.2% of the population were below the poverty line, including 5.7% of those under age 18 and 9.2% of those age 65 or over.

== Education ==
The portion in Forsyth County is within the Winston-Salem/Forsyth County Schools school district.

Old Richmond Elementary, rebuilt in 1978, is the current elementary school that serves students in grades K-5. Northwest Middle School serves the 6-8 grades while North Forsyth High School primarily serves students in grades 9-12. Tobaccoville has a very strong alumni base from North Forsyth. Newly constructed Ronald W. Reagan High School in Pfafftown also serves many students who live in Tobaccoville.

The portion in Stokes County is within the Stokes County Schools school district.

Other schools that serve the citizens of Tobaccoville are Vienna Elementary in Winston-Salem, Rural Hall Elementary, East Bend Elementary, Forbush High School, West Stokes High School, South Stokes High School, Woodland Christian School, Old Town Elementary School, King Elementary, Calvary Christian School, and Forsyth Country Day School.
