= Meadows, North Carolina =

Meadows
- Unincorporated community
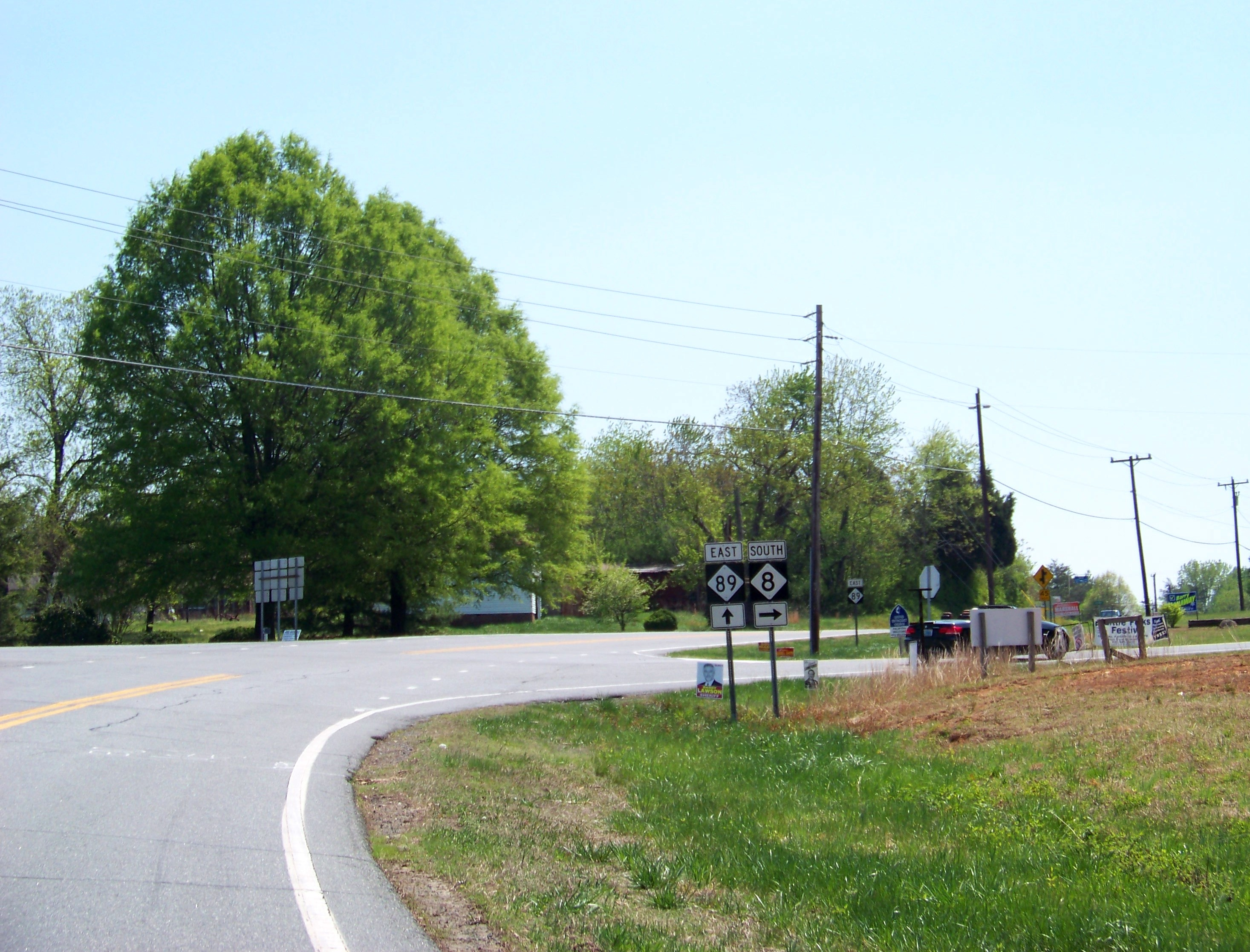
- Meadows, North Carolina at the intersection of NC 8 and NC 89

- Location within the state of North Carolina
- Coordinates: 36°22′10″N 80°10′54″W
- Country: United States
- State: North Carolina
- County: Stokes
- Elevation: 1,014 ft (309 m)
- Time zone: UTC-5 (Eastern (EST))
  - Summer (DST): UTC-4 (EDT)
- ZIP code: 27052
- GNIS feature ID: 989684

Meadows is an unincorporated community in Stokes County, North Carolina, United States, about four miles southeast of the county seat, Danbury, on North Carolina State Highway 8. Meadows at one time had its own community school, which was later consolidated with other community schools into the Walnut Cove schools in the 1920s. Stokes Early College High School has been located in Meadows in 2010.
