= Pine Hall (Pine Hall, North Carolina) =

Historic house in North Carolina, United States

- U.S. National Register of Historic Places
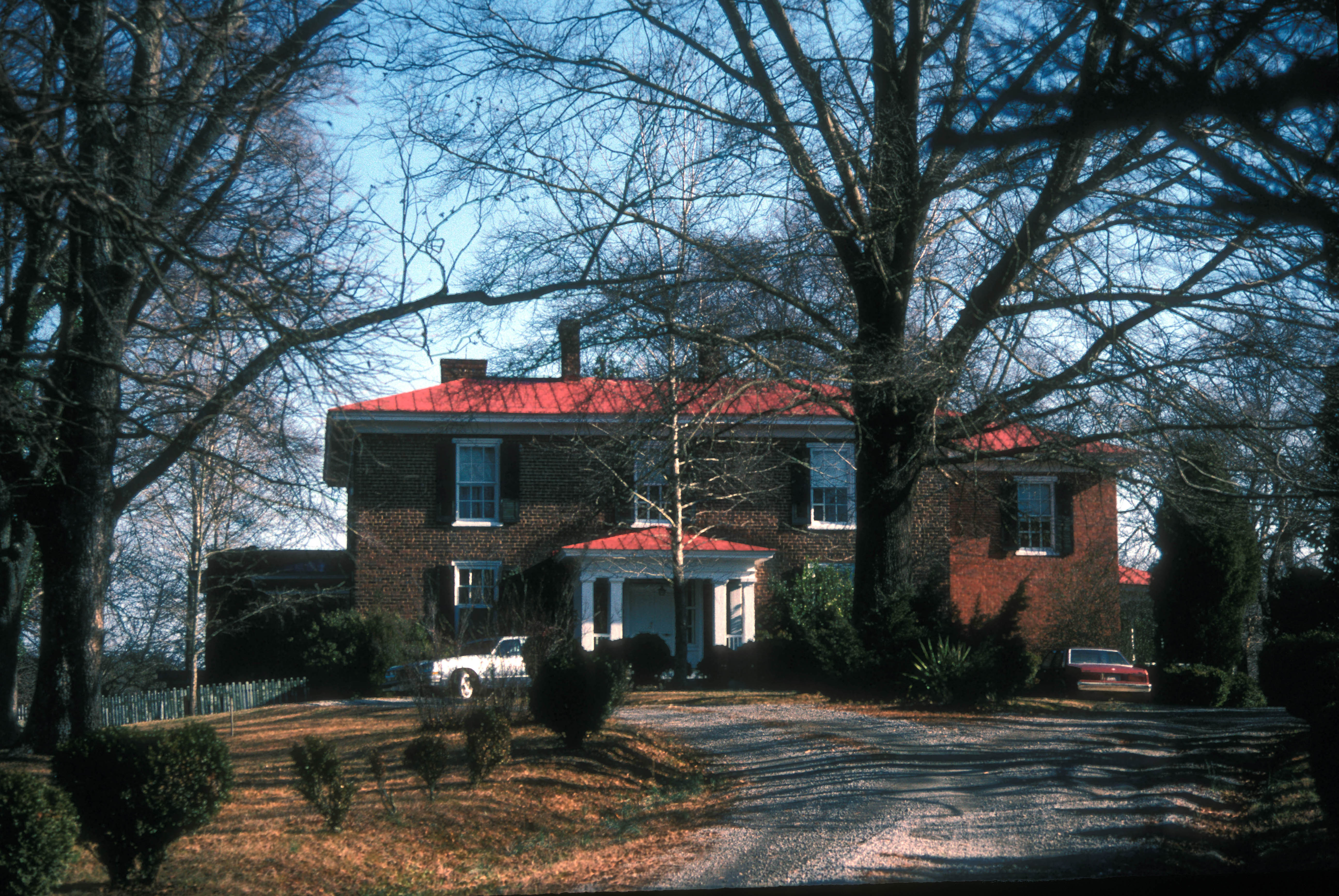

- Location within North Carolina Location within the United States
- Location: SR 1901 and NC 772, Pine Hall, North Carolina
- Coordinates: 36°19′40″N 80°2′31″W
- Built: 1859
- Architectural style: Greek Revival
- NRHP reference No.: 79003350
- Added to NRHP: July 16, 1979

Pine Hall, also known as Anderson-Hanes House, is a historic plantation house located at Pine Hall, Stokes County, North Carolina. It was built in 1859, and is a two-story, three bay by two bay, Greek Revival-style brick dwelling. The front facade features a one-story portico with a hip roof and paired heavy Doric order pillars. Also on the property are a number of contributing outbuildings and a family cemetery.

It was listed on the National Register of Historic Places in 1979.
