= Asbury, North Carolina =

Asbury, North Carolina may refer to:

- Asbury, Stokes County, North Carolina
- Asbury, Wake County, North Carolina, in Wake County, North Carolina
