= Stokes County, North Carolina =

County in North Carolina, United States

- County
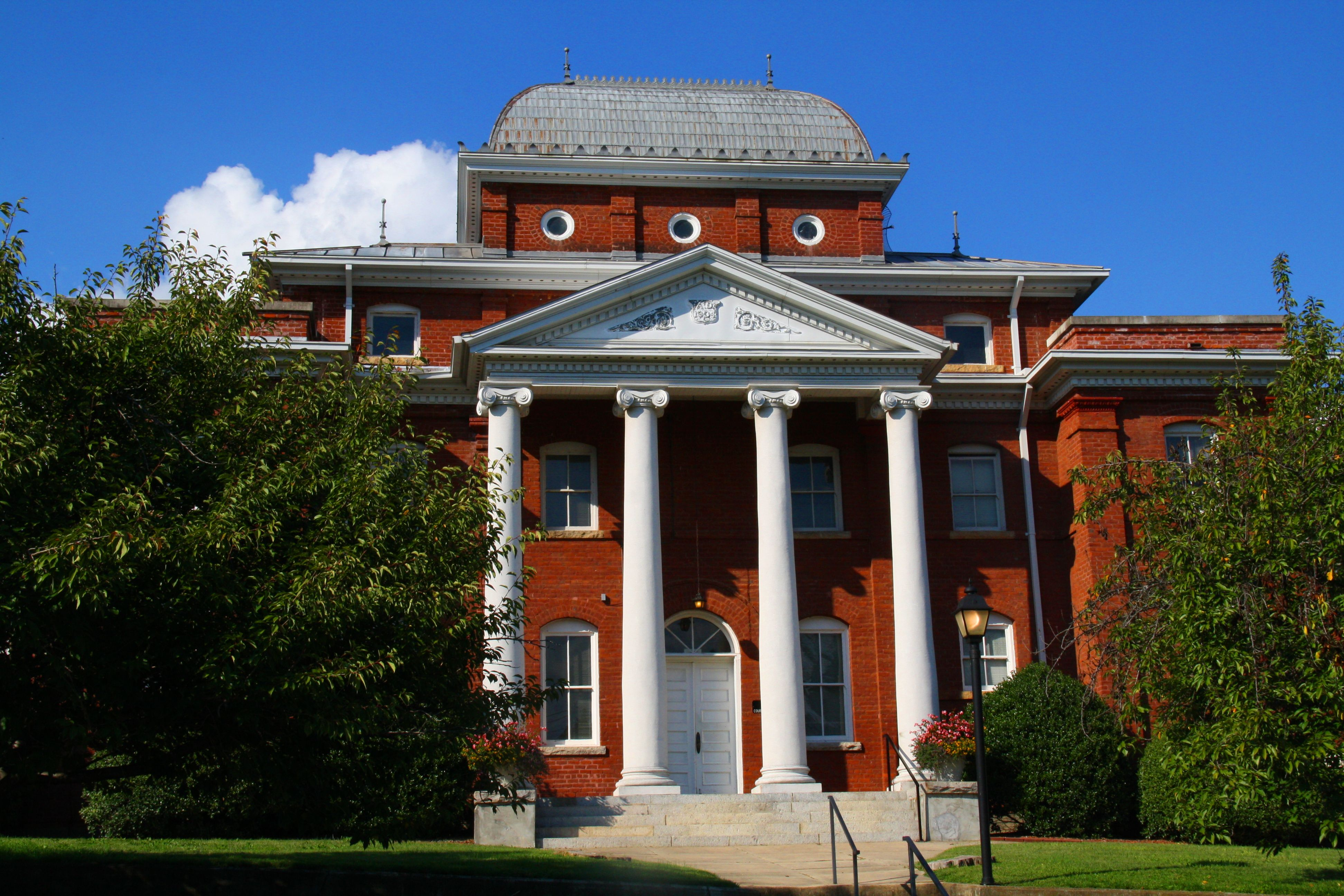
- Stokes County Courthouse in Danbury

- Flag Seal

- Location within the U.S. state of North Carolina
- Coordinates: 36.39°N 80.27°W
- Country: United States
- State: North Carolina
- Founded: 1789
- Named for: John Stokes
- Seat: Danbury
- Largest community: King

Area
  - Total: 456.14 sq mi (1,181.4 km^{2})
  - Land: 449.35 sq mi (1,163.8 km^{2})
  - Water: 6.79 sq mi (17.6 km^{2}) 1.49%

Population (2020)
  - Total: 44,520
  - Estimate (2025): 46,126 ▲
  - Density: 99.08/sq mi (38.26/km^{2})
- Time zone: UTC−5 (Eastern)
  - Summer (DST): UTC−4 (EDT)
- Congressional district: 5th
- Website: www.co.stokes.nc.us

Stokes County is a county located in the U.S. state of North Carolina. As of the 2020 census, the population was 44,520. Its county seat is Danbury.

Stokes County is included in the Winston-Salem, NC, Metropolitan Statistical Area, which is also included in the Greensboro–Winston-Salem–High Point, NC, Combined Statistical Area.

== History ==
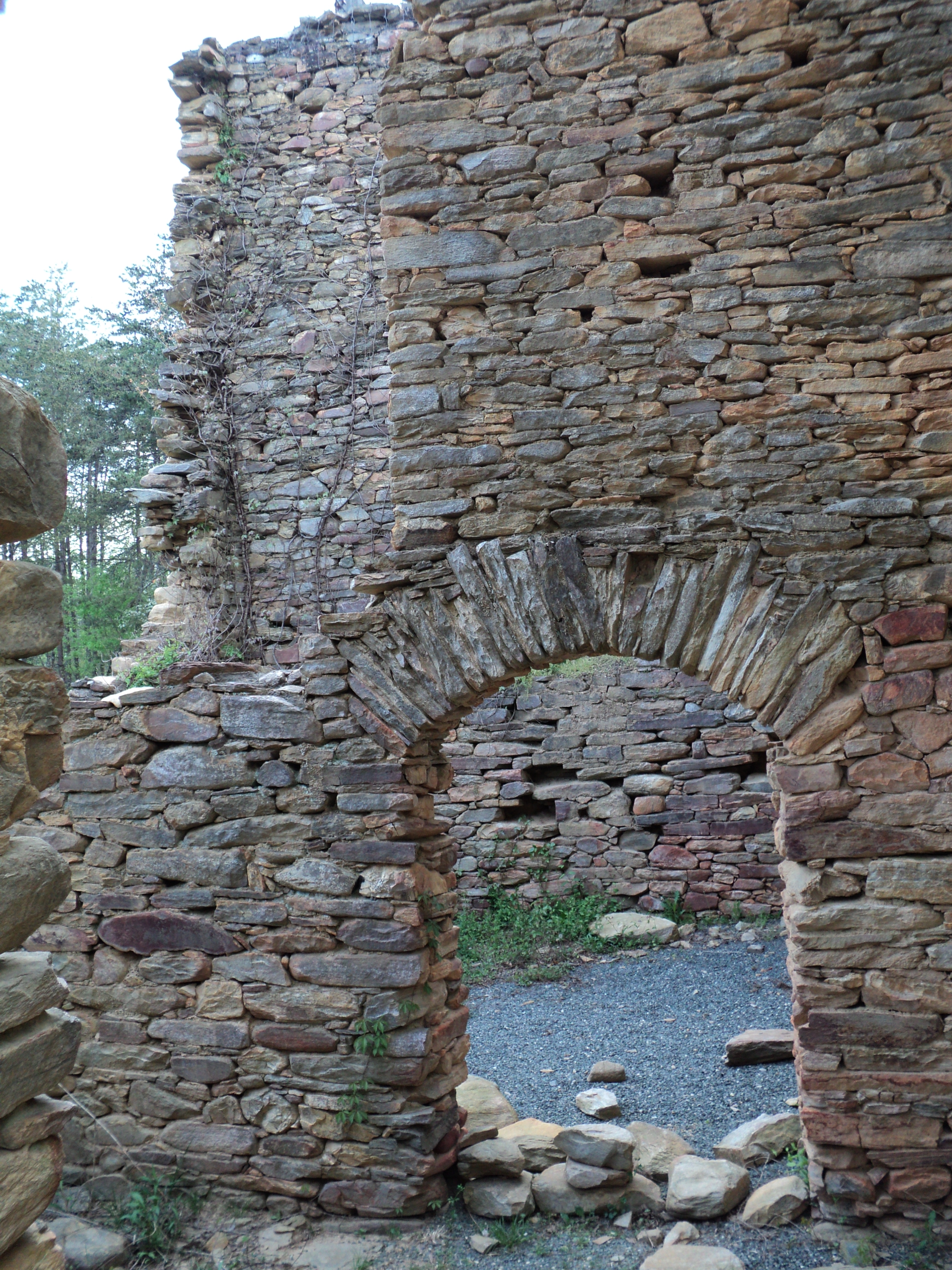
Ruins of the Rock House, c. 1770, built by Capt. Jack Martin, Revolutionary War soldier and pioneer

The county was formed in 1789 from Surry County, and before 1770, it was part of Rowan County. It was named for John Stokes, an American Revolutionary War captain severely wounded when British Colonel Banastre Tarleton's cavalry practically destroyed Col. Abraham Buford's Virginia regiment in the Waxhaws region in 1780. After the war, Captain Stokes was appointed a judge of the United States district court for North Carolina. In 1849 the southern half of Stokes County became Forsyth County.

Stokes was most heavily settled from 1750 to 1775. The Great Wagon Road passed through the eastern portion of the county, and this influenced the pattern of European settlement so that most settlers came from the Virginia Piedmont, and some came from further away in Pennsylvania and other colonies.

As North Carolina held their Secession Convention in May 1861, John Hill represented Stokes County. Unfortunately, while attending the convention in Raleigh, Hill had a stroke and died. He is buried in the Old Hill Burying Ground near Germanton.

During the American Civil War, Moratock Iron Furnace located near Danbury served as a foundry for the Confederate Army. It was destroyed in April 1865 when Union cavalry under the command of General George Stoneman conducted extensive raiding through the region.

Hanging Rock State Park was formed primarily from blocks of land donated in 1936 and contained 6,921 acres (28.01 km^{2}) in 2005. Many of the facilities in the park were built by the Civilian Conservation Corps between 1935 and 1942. The park is located atop the Sauratown Mountains, and contains a visitor center, a manmade lake, and plenty of hiking trails, climbing trails, picnic areas, and primitive campgrounds.

== Geography ==
Interactive map of Stokes County

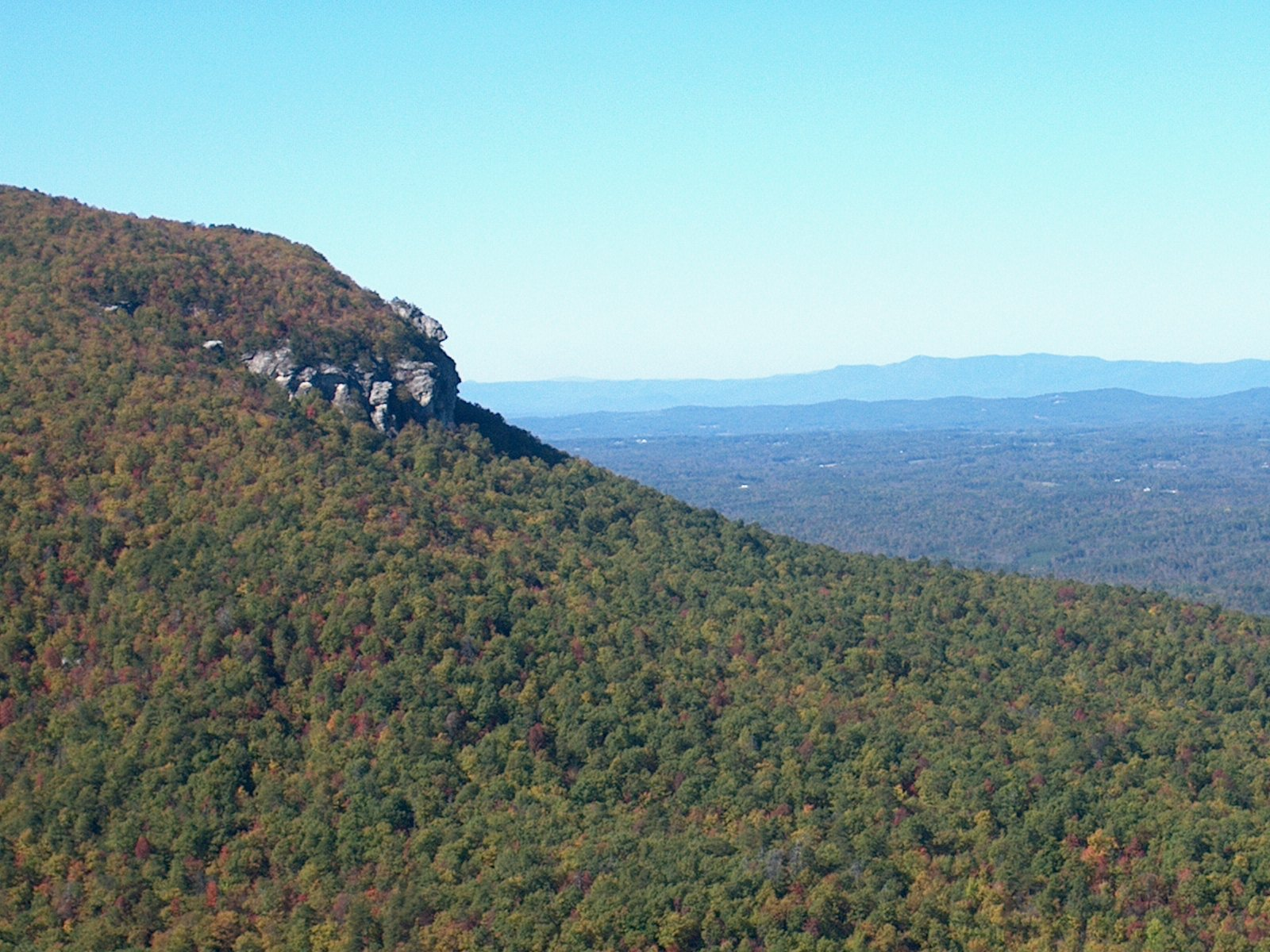
The Sauratown Mountains cut through Stokes County which is otherwise gently rolling piedmont hills. The Blue Ridge Mountains in the background lie to the west of Stokes County.

According to the U.S. Census Bureau, the county has a total area of 456.14 square miles (1,181.4 km^{2}), of which 449.35 square miles (1,163.8 km^{2}) is land and 6.79 square miles (17.6 km^{2}) (1.49%) is water.

The county lies within the Piedmont region of western North Carolina, and most of the terrain consists of gently rolling countryside. The county is part of Appalachia and the Sauratown Mountains run across the center of the county. The Sauras are named after the Saura Native American tribe which lived in the county before European settlement. A chain of jagged ridges, the Sauratown Mountains are an isolated remnant of the Blue Ridge Mountains far to the west. Although the Sauratown Mountains occupy only 5% of Stokes County, they dominate the scenery from almost any direction, abruptly rising from 800 to 1,700 feet (520 m) above the surrounding terrain. Moore's Knob, the highest point in the chain, rises to 2,579 feet (786 m). Most of the county is less than 1,000 feet (300 m) above sea level. The Dan River runs from the northwest corner to the southeastern section of Stokes County (covering over 56 miles of river recreation). Stokes County is home to Hanging Rock State Park and also has the vast majority of Belews Lake (located in the southeast corner).

=== Climate and weather ===
Danbury, NC

Climate chart (precipitation, max. and min. temperature)
J	F	M	A	M	J	J	A	S	O	N	D
3.7 48 24	3 52 26	4.3 60 32	3.6 70 40	4 77 49	4 84 59	5 88 64	4.3 86 62	4.6 80 54	3.6 71 42	3.3 62 33	3.6 51 26
- █ Average max. and min. temperatures in °F
- █ Precipitation totals in inches
- Source: Applied Climate Information System
Metric conversion
J	F	M	A	M	J	J	A	S	O	N	D
93 9 −4	77 11 −3	109 16 0	90 21 4	102 25 10	102 29 15	127 31 18	109 30 17	116 27 12	91 22 5	83 17 0	91 11 −3
- █ Average max. and min. temperatures in °C
- █ Precipitation totals in mm

The climate in Stokes County can be described as mixed-humid, with the Köppen Climate Classification subtype being Cfa. In the county seat of Danbury an average of 39.73" of rain and 9.0" of snow falls per year. Temperatures normally range between a low of 24.2 °F (−4.3 °C) in January to a high of 89 °F 87.7 °F (30.9 °C) in July. Record extremes include: A maximum temperature reading of 103.0 °F (39.4 °C) on August 21, 1983. A minimum temperature reading of −10 °F (−23 °C) on January 21, 1985. A three-day accumulated snowfall record of 34.0" was set during the Blizzard of 1996.

=== State and local protected areas ===
- East Walnut Cove Community Park
- Hanging Rock State Park
- Hill Farm Game Land

=== Major water bodies ===
- Belews Creek
- Belews Lake
- Big Beaver Island Creek
- Big Creek
- Buffalo Creek
- Crooked Creek
- Dan River
- Flat Shoal Creek
- Little Dan River
- Little Neatman Creek
- Little Peters Creek
- Little Yadkin River
- Mill Creek
- Neatman Creek
- Oldfield Creek
- Peters Creek
- Pinch Gut Creek
- Snow Creek
- Vade Mecum Creek

=== Adjacent counties ===
- Patrick County, Virginia – north
- Henry County, Virginia – northeast
- Rockingham County – east
- Guilford County – southeast
- Forsyth County – south
- Surry County – west

=== Major highways ===
- Future I-74
- US 52
- US 311
- NC 8
- NC 65
- NC 66
- NC 89
- NC 268
- NC 704
- NC 770
- NC 772

== Demographics ==
Historical population
Census	Pop.	Note	%±
1790	8,423		—
1800	11,026		30.9%
1810	11,645		5.6%
1820	14,033		20.5%
1830	16,196		15.4%
1840	16,265		0.4%
1850	9,206		−43.4%
1860	10,402		13.0%
1870	11,208		7.7%
1880	15,353		37.0%
1890	17,199		12.0%
1900	19,866		15.5%
1910	20,151		1.4%
1920	20,575		2.1%
1930	22,290		8.3%
1940	22,656		1.6%
1950	21,520		−5.0%
1960	22,314		3.7%
1970	23,782		6.6%
1980	33,086		39.1%
1990	37,223		12.5%
2000	44,712		20.1%
2010	47,401		6.0%
2020	44,520		−6.1%
2025 (est.)	46,126	▲	3.6%
U.S. Decennial Census; 1790–1960 1900–1990; 1990–2000 2010 2020

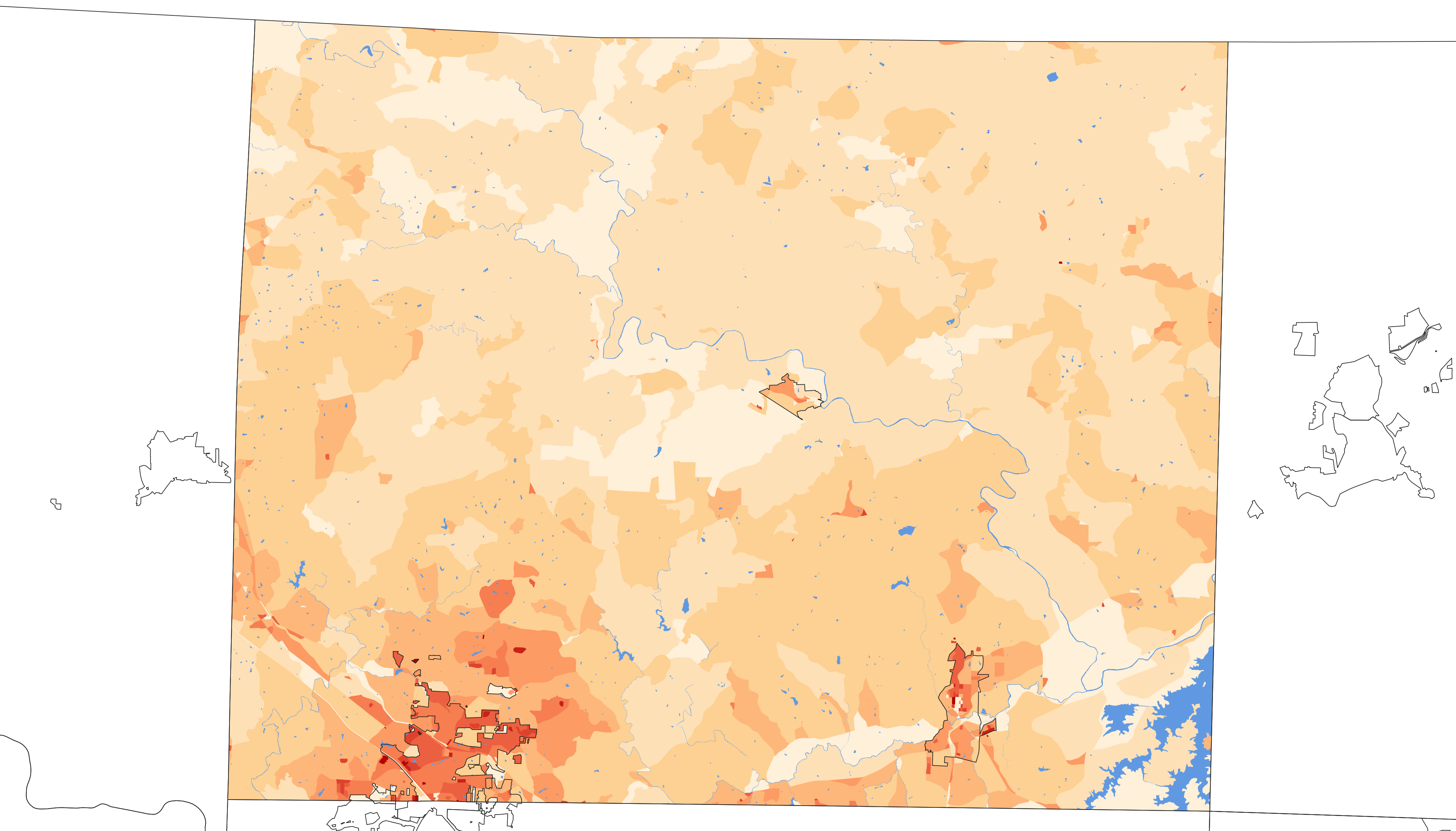
2020 population density of Stokes County NC by census block

=== Racial and ethnic composition ===
Stokes County, North Carolina – Racial and ethnic composition Note: the US Census treats Hispanic/Latino as an ethnic category. This table excludes Latinos from the racial categories and assigns them to a separate category. Hispanics/Latinos may be of any race.
Race / Ethnicity (NH = Non-Hispanic)	Pop 1980	Pop 1990	Pop 2000	Pop 2010	Pop 2020	% 1980	% 1990	% 2000	% 2010	% 2020
White alone (NH)	30,387	34,787	41,379	43,447	39,609	91.84%	93.46%	92.55%	91.66%	88.97%
Black or African American alone (NH)	2,353	2,063	2,068	1,897	1,619	7.11%	5.54%	4.63%	4.00%	3.64%
Native American or Alaska Native alone (NH)	35	45	105	138	140	0.11%	0.12%	0.23%	0.29%	0.31%
Asian alone (NH)	43	73	82	125	158	0.13%	0.20%	0.18%	0.26%	0.35%
Native Hawaiian or Pacific Islander alone (NH)	x	x	17	7	11	x	x	0.04%	0.01%	0.02%
Other race alone (NH)	28	1	14	39	77	0.08%	0.00%	0.03%	0.08%	0.17%
Mixed race or Multiracial (NH)	x	x	210	494	1,450	x	x	0.47%	1.04%	3.26%
Hispanic or Latino (any race)	240	254	836	1,254	1,456	0.73%	0.68%	1.87%	2.65%	3.27%
Total	33,086	37,223	44,711	47,401	44,520	100.00%	100.00%	100.00%	100.00%	100.00%

=== 2020 census ===
As of the 2020 census, the county had a population of 44,520 people, 18,893 households, and 13,348 families residing in the county. The median age was 47.7 years; 19.0% of residents were under the age of 18 and 22.3% of residents were 65 years of age or older. For every 100 females there were 95.4 males, and for every 100 females age 18 and over there were 93.3 males age 18 and over.

The racial makeup of the county was 89.8% White, 3.7% Black or African American, 0.4% American Indian and Alaska Native, 0.4% Asian, <0.1% Native Hawaiian and Pacific Islander, 1.4% from some other race, and 4.3% from two or more races. Hispanic or Latino residents of any race comprised 3.3% of the population.

19.5% of residents lived in urban areas, while 80.5% lived in rural areas.

There were 21,160 housing units, of which 10.7% were vacant. Among occupied housing units, 77.8% were owner-occupied and 22.2% were renter-occupied. The homeowner vacancy rate was 1.1% and the rental vacancy rate was 5.4%.

=== 2000 census ===
At the 2000 census, there were 44,712 people, 17,579 households, and 13,043 families residing in the county. The population density was 99 people per square mile (38 people/km^{2}). There were 19,262 housing units at an average density of 43 units per square mile (17 units/km^{2}). The racial makeup of the county was 93.43% White, 4.66% Black or African American, 0.24% Native American, 0.19% Asian, 0.05% Pacific Islander, 0.88% from other races, and 0.54% from two or more races. 1.87% of the population were Hispanic or Latino of any race.

There were 17,579 households, out of which 33.80% had children under the age of 18 living with them, 60.60% were married couples living together, 9.70% had a female householder with no husband present, and 25.80% were non-families. 22.80% of all households were made up of individuals, and 8.90% had someone living alone who was 65 years of age or older. The average household size was 2.51 and the average family size was 2.94.

In the county, the population was spread out, with 24.50% under the age of 18, 7.30% from 18 to 24, 31.40% from 25 to 44, 25.00% from 45 to 64, and 11.80% who were 65 years of age or older. The median age was 37 years. For every 100 females there were 96.10 males. For every 100 females age 18 and over, there were 92.60 males.

The median income for a household in the county was $38,808, and the median income for a family was $44,615. Males had a median income of $30,824 versus $24,319 for females. The per capita income for the county was $18,130. About 6.90% of families and 9.10% of the population were below the poverty line, including 10.00% of those under age 18 and 15.90% of those age 65 or over.

== Government and politics ==
=== Government ===
Stokes County is a member of the Piedmont Triad Council of Governments, a regional voluntary association of 12 counties. Stokes County government is made up of five elected County Commissioners with an appointed County Manager, Clerk to the Board of County Commissioners, Finance Director, and Tax Administrator.

Stokes County lies within the bounds of the 23rd Prosecutorial District, the 17B Superior Court District, and the 17B District Court District.

=== Politics ===
United States presidential election results for Stokes County, North Carolina
Year	Republican		Democratic		Third party(ies)	
Year	No.	%	No.	%	No.	%
1912	1,450	51.31%	1,144	40.48%	232	8.21%
1916	1,852	53.81%	1,569	45.58%	21	0.61%
1920	2,926	59.41%	1,999	40.59%	0	0.00%
1924	2,482	51.33%	2,309	47.76%	44	0.91%
1928	3,759	65.61%	1,970	34.39%	0	0.00%
1932	2,577	40.69%	3,721	58.76%	35	0.55%
1936	3,259	42.64%	4,384	57.36%	0	0.00%
1940	2,712	38.82%	4,274	61.18%	0	0.00%
1944	3,376	45.10%	4,110	54.90%	0	0.00%
1948	3,291	41.71%	4,431	56.15%	169	2.14%
1952	3,792	45.71%	4,504	54.29%	0	0.00%
1956	4,341	52.37%	3,948	47.63%	0	0.00%
1960	4,872	52.06%	4,487	47.94%	0	0.00%
1964	4,664	48.78%	4,898	51.22%	0	0.00%
1968	4,781	45.25%	2,374	22.47%	3,410	32.28%
1972	7,118	66.86%	3,254	30.57%	274	2.57%
1976	6,029	47.43%	6,647	52.29%	35	0.28%
1980	7,275	54.93%	5,764	43.52%	206	1.56%
1984	9,515	65.63%	4,950	34.14%	33	0.23%
1988	8,661	61.81%	5,319	37.96%	32	0.23%
1992	7,979	47.90%	6,463	38.80%	2,215	13.30%
1996	9,471	61.82%	4,769	31.13%	1,080	7.05%
2000	12,028	70.00%	5,030	29.27%	124	0.72%
2004	13,583	69.96%	5,767	29.71%	64	0.33%
2008	14,488	66.63%	6,875	31.62%	380	1.75%
2012	15,237	70.48%	6,018	27.84%	364	1.68%
2016	17,116	75.90%	4,665	20.69%	769	3.41%
2020	20,142	78.37%	5,286	20.57%	273	1.06%
2024	21,548	79.29%	5,380	19.80%	247	0.91%

Stokes is at present a powerfully Republican county. The last Democratic presidential nominee to carry Stokes County was Jimmy Carter in 1976, and no Democrat since 1980 has reached forty percent of the county's vote. Hillary Clinton barely cracked twenty percent in 2016, receiving a proportion smaller than Hubert Humphrey obtained in the three-way 1968 race. In earlier years Stokes swung from Democratic-leaning during the Third Party System to Republican enough to be alongside Yadkin and Surry as the only North Carolina counties to stick with William Howard Taft during his disastrous 1912 campaign, back to Democratic enough to support Adlai Stevenson II in 1952. In the November 2020 elections, Republican candidates across the county took between 70 and 80 percent of the vote.

== Economy ==
Stokes County has long been a "bedroom community" or "commuter town" for larger towns surrounding, such as Winston-Salem, Greensboro, Mount Airy, etc. Stokes County has struggled with economic development for several reasons such as infrastructure. Several medium and small businesses have found success in Stokes, as well as retail stores, restaurants, and service professionals. The largest employer in the county is the government/school system. For 2023, the North Carolina Department of Commerce rated Stokes as a Tier 2 county, between the state's most prosperous and economically distressed.

== Education ==
All of Stokes County is within the Stokes County Schools school district. The district operates 11 elementary schools, 3 middle schools, and 5 high schools, including The Stokes Early College.

== Communities ==
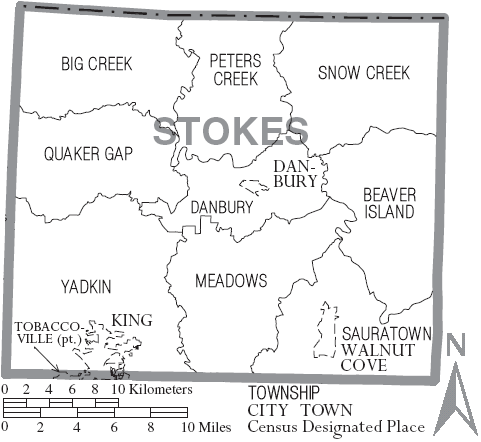
Map of Stokes County with municipal and township labels

=== Cities ===
- Danbury (county seat)
- King (largest community; also in Forsyth County)

=== Town ===
- Walnut Cove
- Stokesdale (mostly in Guilford County)

=== Village ===
- Tobaccoville (also in Forsyth County)

=== Census-designated places ===
- Germanton (also in Forsyth County)
- Pinnacle

=== Unincorporated communities ===
- Aarons Corner
- Asbury
- Boyles Chapel
- Brook Cove
- Brown Mountain
- Campbell
- Capella
- Ceramic
- Chestnut Grove
- Collinstown
- Dalton
- Dillard
- Dodgetown
- Flat Rock
- Flat Shoals
- Francisco
- Gap
- Hartman
- Lawsonville
- Meadows
- Moores Springs
- Mountain View
- Mount Olive
- Neatman
- Oak Ridge
- Pine Hall
- Poplar Springs
- Prestonville
- Quaker Gap
- Rosebud
- Sandy Ridge
- Volunteer
- Westfield (part; mostly in Surry County)

=== Townships ===
- Beaver Island
- Big Creek
- Danbury
- Meadows
- Peters Creek
- Quaker Gap
- Sauratown
- Snow Creek
- Yadkin

== Notable people ==
- William P. Bynum, associate justice of the North Carolina Supreme Court and member of the North Carolina Senate

== See also ==
- List of counties in North Carolina
- National Register of Historic Places listings in Stokes County, North Carolina
- Yadkin Valley AVA, wine region partially located in the county
