= Stokesdale, North Carolina =

- Town
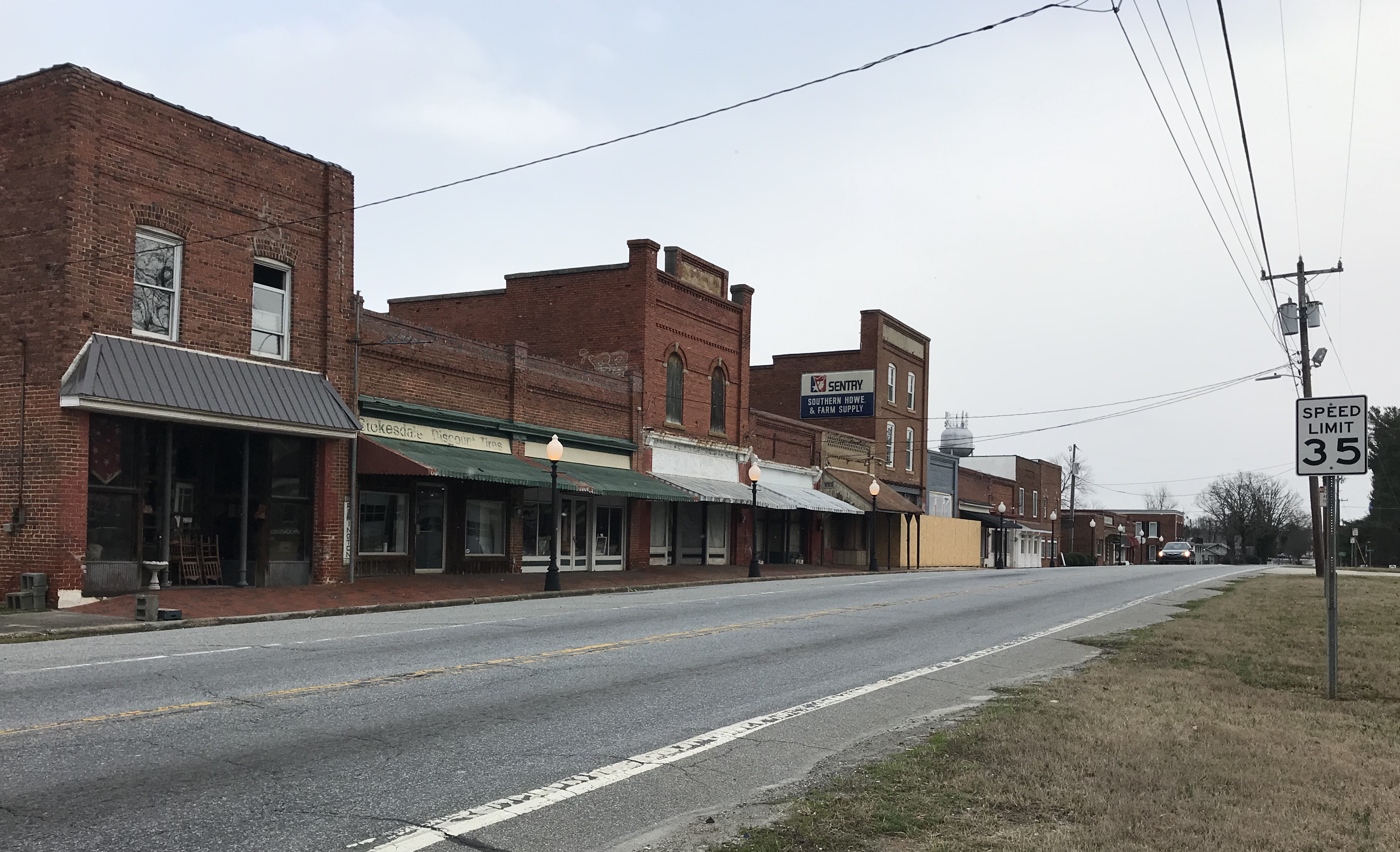

- Flag Seal
- Motto: "Amor Vincit Omnia" (Latin) (Love conquers all)
- Location in Guilford County, Rockingham County and the state of North Carolina.
- Coordinates: 36°13′54″N 79°59′00″W
- Country: United States
- State: North Carolina
- County: Guilford County, Rockingham County, Forsyth County, Stokes County
- Incorporated: 1907

Government
  - Type: Mayor-council
  - Mayor: Tee Stephenson

Area
  - Total: 19.18 sq mi (49.68 km^{2})
  - Land: 19.03 sq mi (49.29 km^{2})
  - Water: 0.15 sq mi (0.38 km^{2})
- Elevation: 935 ft (285 m)

Population (2020)
  - Total: 5,924
  - Density: 311.2/sq mi (120.17/km^{2})
- Time zone: UTC-5 (Eastern (EST))
  - Summer (DST): UTC-4 (EDT)
- ZIP code: 27357
- Area code: 336
- FIPS code: 37-65040
- GNIS feature ID: 2406668
- Website: www.stokesdale.org

Stokesdale is a town in Guilford County, North Carolina, United States with small parts in the counties of Rockingham, Forsyth, and Stokes. The population was 5,924 at the 2020 census. Belews Lake is located nearby, and North Carolina Highway 68 and North Carolina Highway 65 both intersect U.S. Route 158 near the town's center.

== Geography ==
According to the United States Census Bureau, the town has a total area of 19.5 square miles (51 km^{2}), of which 19.4 square miles (50 km^{2}) is land and 0.1 square miles (0.26 km^{2}) (0.56%) is water. The town is located in the most northwesterly corner of Guilford County, right where the four counties of Forsyth, Stokes, Rockingham, and Guilford come together.

== Demographics ==
Historical population
Census	Pop.	Note	%±
1910	159		—
1920	179		12.6%
1930	238		33.0%
1990	2,134		—
2000	3,267		53.1%
2010	5,047		54.5%
2020	5,924		17.4%
U.S. Decennial Census

=== 2020 census ===
As of the 2020 census, there were 5,924 people, 2,121 households, and 1,439 families residing in the town.

The median age was 42.3 years. About 24.8% of residents were under the age of 18 and 14.6% were 65 years of age or older. For every 100 females, there were 100.6 males, and for every 100 females age 18 and over, there were 95.9 males age 18 and over.

0.0% of residents lived in urban areas, while 100.0% lived in rural areas.

Among households in Stokesdale, 40.1% had children under the age of 18 living in them. Of all households, 67.8% were married-couple households, 11.4% were households with a male householder and no spouse or partner present, and 16.8% were households with a female householder and no spouse or partner present. About 15.1% of all households were made up of individuals, and 7.2% had someone living alone who was 65 years of age or older.

There were 2,244 housing units, of which 5.5% were vacant. The homeowner vacancy rate was 1.4%, and the rental vacancy rate was 11.1%.

Stokesdale racial composition
Race	Number	Percentage
White (non-Hispanic)	4,969	83.88%
Black or African American (non-Hispanic)	275	4.64%
Native American	28	0.47%
Asian	134	2.26%
Other/Mixed	192	3.24%
Hispanic or Latino	326	5.5%

=== 2010 census ===
As of the census of 2010, there were 5,047 people, 1,201 households, and 962 families residing in the town. The population density was 168.5 inhabitants per square mile (65.1/km^{2}). There were 1,268 housing units at an average density of 65.4 per square mile (25.3/km^{2}). The racial makeup of the town was 90.69% White, 6.95% African American, 0.31% Native American, 0.67% Asian, 0.46% from other races, and 0.92% from two or more races. Hispanic or Latino of any race were 1.93% of the population.

There were 1,201 households, out of which 38.3% had children under the age of 18 living with them, 68.9% were married couples living together, 7.7% had a female householder with no husband present, and 19.9% were non-families. 16.5% of all households were made up of individuals, and 8.7% had someone living alone who was 65 years of age or older. The average household size was 2.67 and the average family size was 2.99.

In the town, the population was spread out, with 26.2% under the age of 18, 5.7% from 18 to 24, 33.7% from 25 to 44, 21.2% from 45 to 64, and 13.3% who were 65 years of age or older. The median age was 38 years. For every 100 females, there were 97.9 males. For every 100 females age 18 and over, there were 94.1 males.

The median income for a household in the town was $51,484, and the median income for a family was $58,185. Males had a median income of $37,167 versus $28,875 for females. The per capita income for the town was $22,548. About 5.2% of families and 5.3% of the population were below the poverty line, including 5.7% of those under age 18 and 12.9% of those age 65 or over.

== Education ==
Stokesdale is home to Stokesdale Elementary School, which serves as the primary school for Pre-K to fifth grade students in the town. Students in Stokesdale continue to attend Northwest Guilford Middle School and Northwest Guilford High School, located to the south in Greensboro. All three schools have Vikings as their mascot and school colors of red, black and white.
