= Stokes Early College =

Stokes Early College High School

Location
- 1165 Dodgetown Road; Walnut Cove, North Carolina 27052; United States
- 36°22′29″N 80°10′57″W

Information
- Established: 2009 (17 years ago)
- School district: Stokes County Schools
- Principal: David Durham
- Grades: 9–12 (optional 13th year)
- Average class size: 18–20
- Colors: Red and black
- Athletics: None
- Mascot: Falcon
- Website: www.earlycollege.stokes.k12.nc.us

Stokes Early College High School is located in Walnut Cove, North Carolina, in the Meadows community, on the Stokes County Campus of Forsyth Technical Community College. It is part of the Stokes County Schools and is financed and coordinated in cooperation of the New Schools Project of the North Carolina State Department of Public Instruction.

== History ==
The Stokes Early College High School (SECHS) is a North Carolina Cooperative Innovative High School that serves to offer students the opportunity to advance their educational career by being a “Dually Enrolled” student through Forsyth Technical Community College.

The school’s first year of operation was the 2009-2010 school year, where 50 freshmen, admitted to the school, gathered at the Forsyth Tech Northwest Center. In Fall 2010 the school moved to its current location. Initially, the High School and College shared the same building. The next year a second building was added to the campus.

In Spring of 2013, the first graduating class of 29 Seniors graduated from both the Early College and Forsyth Tech, marking the beginning of an outstanding track record with students graduating, far above that of other schools.

During the 2016-2017 school year, the Forsyth Tech Stokes Center building was opened, making the High School, and select County Departments, the exclusive occupants of the modern day High School A and B buildings. Then, in 2019-2020, the Forsyth Tech Trades Building was completed, although classes did not officially begin until the next year. This allowed for new opportunities and avenues for students to take advantage of in the pursuit of their future, no longer making an Associates Degree the only option for students of SECHS.

Modern Day, SECHS is home for between 160-180 students. Per the website, the goal for the Early College is “[...] providing rich, personalized opportunities for a diverse body of students, to be challenged academically and engaged creatively, in order to cultivate educational and occupational success and to maximize the potential of each and every learner.” Students who enter the Early College Program now have a wide variety of options at their fingertips, having access to many of the programs through Forsyth Tech, along with the options to pursue an Associates Degree in either Art or Science, pursue a Career Certificate, or at the very least College Credit, on top of their traditional High School Diploma.

== Curriculum ==
Students at Stokes Early College High School experience a rigorous academic schedule throughout all four/five years.

The underclass schedule is very rigorous with the expectation that most of their high school credits will be attained by the time they enter their junior year. Classes are taught on a modified block schedule with holidays that align with Forsyth Tech's schedule. All students have dual enrollment; they are enrolled in both Forsyth Tech and in the Stokes County school system. Juniors and Seniors take classes largely at Forsyth Tech, which count towards their remaining high school credits as well as college credits. Upon admission within the University of North Carolina system, many enter as freshmen with credit and become a junior their second year in the university.
