= Stokes County Schools =

Public school system in North Carolina

Address
- PO Box 50; 100 Courthouse Circle; Danbury, North Carolina 27016 Stokes County, North Carolina

District information
- Grades: pre-K – 12
- Superintendent: Dr. Phillip Bradley "Brad" Rice
- Accreditation: AdvancED
- Schools: 19

Students and staff
- Students: 5828 (2018/2019 school year)

Other information
- Website: www.stokes.k12.nc.us

Stokes County Schools is a public school system in Stokes County, North Carolina, serving students in grades pre-K – 12, in 19 public schools.

The district's boundaries parallel those of the county.

== Schools ==
=== High schools (9 – 12) ===
- North Stokes High School
- South Stokes High School
- West Stokes High School

=== Dual enrollment high school ===
- Stokes Early College (9 – 12, with optional 13th year)

=== Middle schools (6 – 8) ===
- Chestnut Grove Middle School
- Piney Grove Middle School
- Southeastern Stokes Middle School

=== Elementary schools (K – 5) ===
- Germanton Elementary School
- King Elementary School (pre-K available)
- Lawsonville Elementary School
- London Elementary School (pre-K available)
- Mount Olive Elementary School
- Nancy Reynolds Elementary School
- Pine Hall Elementary School
- Pinnacle Elementary School (pre-K available)
- Poplar Springs Elementary School (pre-K available)
- Sandy Ridge Elementary School
- Walnut Cove Elementary School

=== Alternative school ===
- Meadowbrook Academy (6 – 12)
