= Brook Cove, North Carolina =

Brook Cove
- Unincorporated community
- Location within the state of North Carolina
- Coordinates: 36.2865263°N 80.1894916°W
- Country: United States
- State: North Carolina
- County: Stokes
- Elevation: 663 ft (202 m)
- Time zone: UTC-5 (Eastern (EST))
  - Summer (DST): UTC-4 (EDT)
- Area code: 336
- GNIS feature ID: 1019315

Brook Cove is an unincorporated community in Stokes County, North Carolina, United States. It is a couple of miles from the towns of Walnut Cove and Germanton.
