= Dalton, North Carolina =

Dalton
- Unincorporated community
- Location within the state of North Carolina
- Coordinates: 36°18′32″N 80°24′04″W
- Country: United States
- State: North Carolina
- County: Stokes
- Time zone: UTC-5 (Eastern (EST))
  - Summer (DST): UTC-4 (EDT)
- ZIP codes: 27043

Dalton is an unincorporated community in Stokes County, North Carolina, United States.
