= Belews Lake =

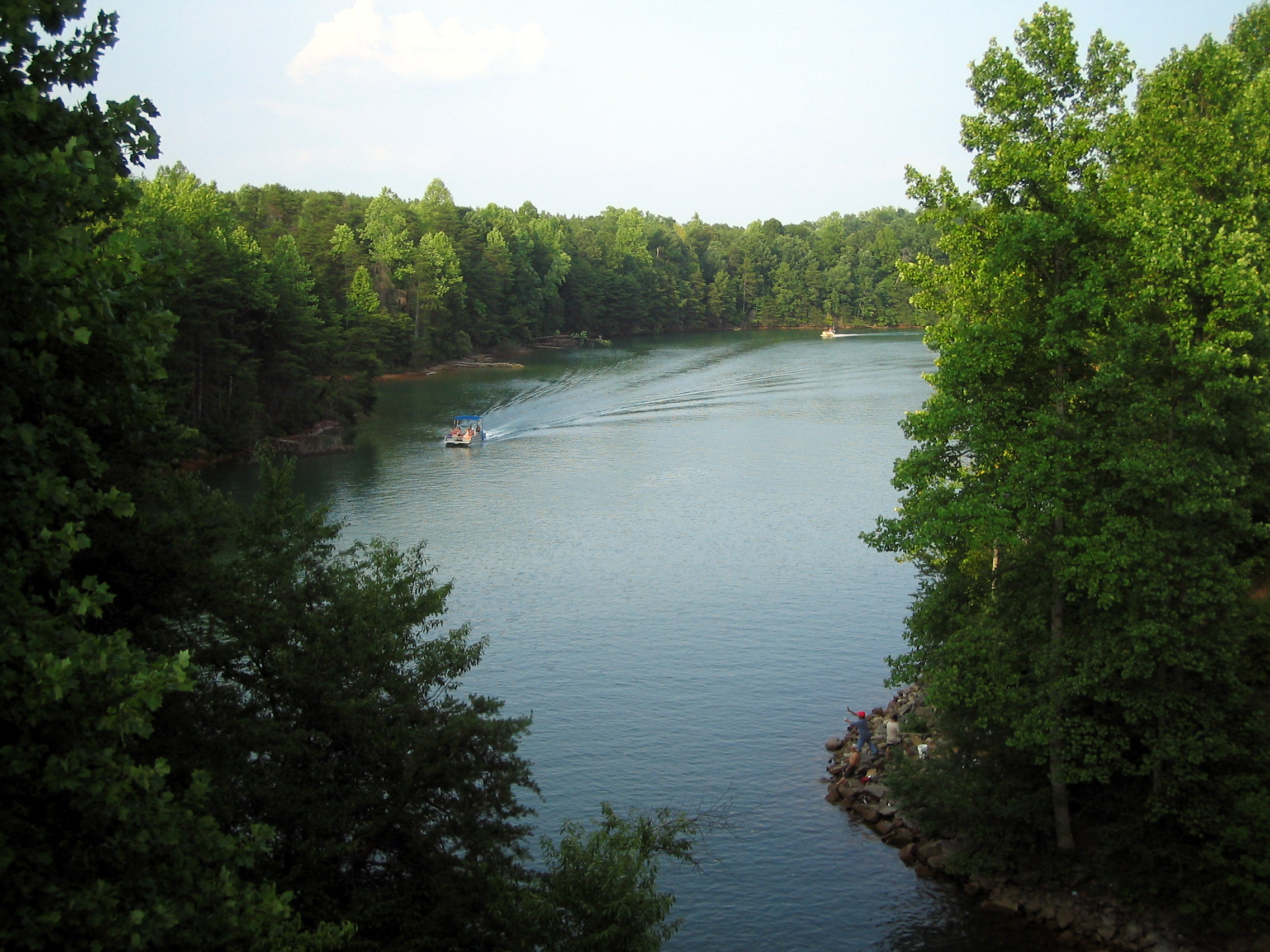

- Location within North Carolina Location within the United States
- Location: Stokes / Rockingham / Guilford / Forsyth counties, North Carolina, United States
- Coordinates: 36°17′56″N 80°02′15″W
- Type: reservoir
- Primary inflows: Belews Creek
- Primary outflows: Belews Creek
- Basin countries: United States
- Max. length: 5.15 miles (8.29 km)
- Max. width: 0.96 miles (1.54 km)
- Surface area: 3,864-acre (16 km^{2})
- Surface elevation: 722 feet (220 m)
- Islands: numerous islets

Belews Lake is a reservoir in Stokes, Rockingham, Guilford and Forsyth counties of North Carolina, near the towns of Stokesdale and Pine Hall. It was created in 1973 by the Duke Energy corporation as a cooling basin for the corporation's Belews Creek Steam Station, a coal-burning power plant. Belews Lake faced a hardship as selenium contaminated the lake, affecting human use, wildlife, and other ecological concerns. Through a long recovery journey, it now stands as a multi-purpose lake, supporting the Belews Creek Steam Station and providing recreation use for the popular surrounding community.

== Background ==
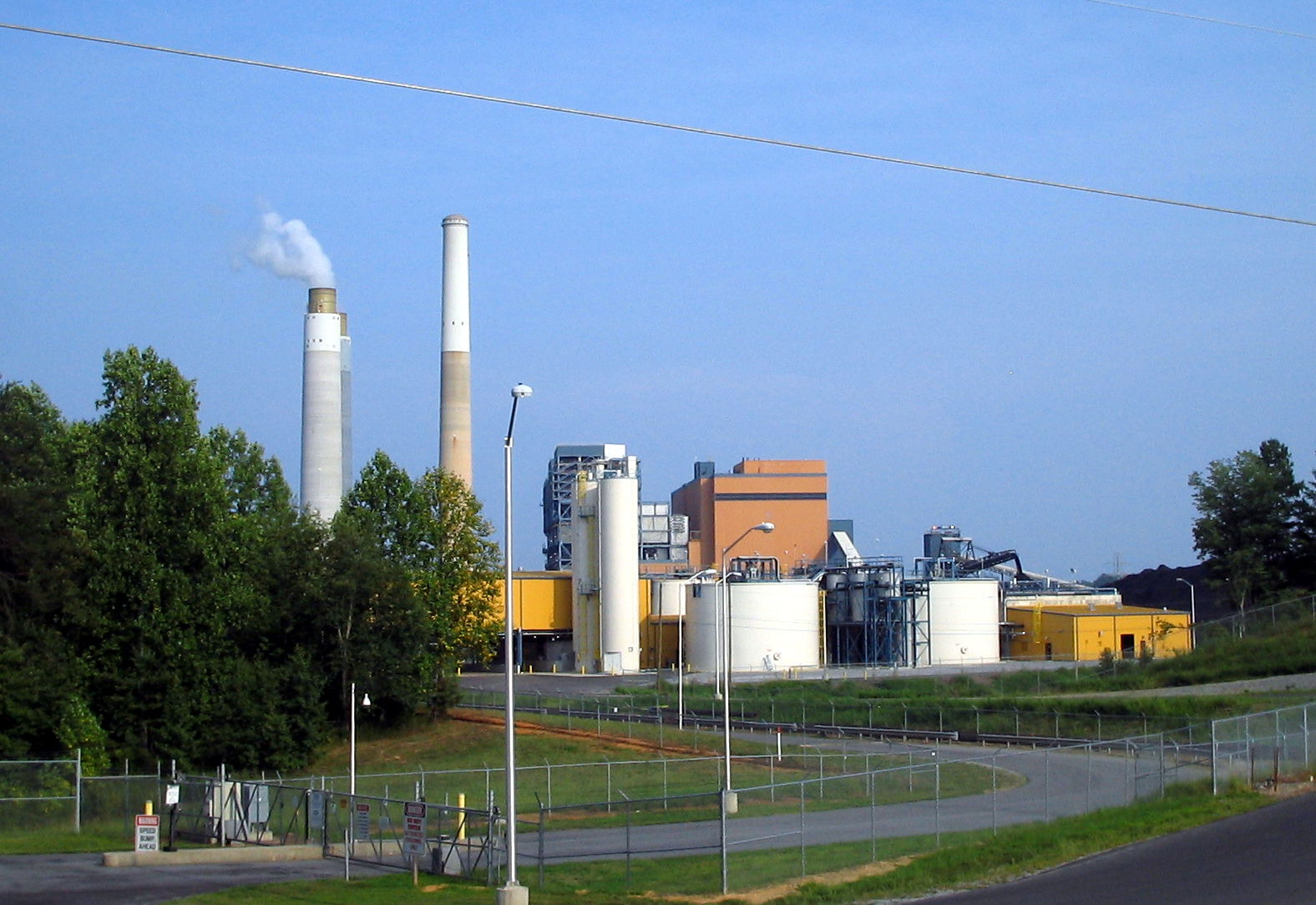
Belews Creek Steam Station

The power plant was created in the early 1970s for Duke Energy, so the lake was dug and opened in 1973. Belews Lake was formed from Belews Creek, a small tributary of the Dan River. U.S. Route 158 and North Carolina Highway 65, as well as a number of secondary roads provide access to the lake. The lake has a surface area of 3,864 acres (16 km^{2}) and an 88-mile (142 km) shoreline. It is held back by a rolled earth dam and a concrete spillway. The northern portion of the lake commonly has depths of over 100 feet (30 m) and the lake reaches up to 130 feet (40 m) deep in the vicinity of the dam. There is no hydroelectric power generation at this dam, so the lake is not bound by many FERC regulations.

Cooling water was pumped back and forth between the plant and reservoir until 1986 when the corporation decided to use other methods to dispose of their coal ash waste. From 1974 to 1986, contaminants such as vanadium, nickel, cobalt, barium, and arsenic were introduced into the lake through the release of contaminated cooling water from the power plant back into the lake. Many scientific studies were undertaken at Belews Lake and their findings, along with those conducted at the Kesterson Reservoir, are fundamental to today's understanding of the ecological risks associated with elevated selenium concentrations in aquatic systems.

There are four public boat ramps on the lake, with two being commissioned by the North Carolina Wildlife Resources Commission (NCWRC). Piney Bluff is located on the southern part of the lake, in Forsyth County, with an entrance on NC Highway 65. Pine Hall Boat Launch is the closest to the plant, located in Stokes County, with the ramp being located on the west-northwest part of the lake, with entrance from Pine Hall Rd. Carolina Marina is located in the northern part of the lake, in Rockingham County, with a fee for use. Humphreys Ridge has a boat ramp located on the eastern side of the lake, in Rockingham County.

== Contamination ==
Belews Lake was contaminated with selenium as a result of the repeated release of wastewater generated by the adjacent Duke Energy coal-fired power plant into the lake beginning in 1974. Selenium, when ingested in high concentrations, is toxic to animals. Selenium bioaccumulates in both terrestrial and aquatic food chains and in animals found at high trophic levels. Elevated levels of selenium cause reproductive and teratogenic defects in fish populations and also inhibit gill, liver, kidney, heart, and eye function.

The number of species of fish in the main basin of Belews Lake fell from 24 to 6 between 1975 and 2002. One explanation for the decrease in species diversity is the sharp decline in reproduction rates of piscivorous fish, such as largemouth bass and green sunfish, after 1975 following the introduction of selenium rich coal ash sluice into the lake. Another study found that 19 of the 20 original species found in Belews Lake experienced reproductive failure and no offspring successfully survived due to selenium poisoning. The species composition of the lake changed from a mix of fish species at several trophic levels to a near complete dominance by fish at lower trophic levels that consume plankton and were not greatly impacted by selenium bioaccumulation. Mosquitofish were found to be tolerant of heightened selenium levels and were able to thrive as other fish species were eradicated.

Hundreds of analyses were run at Belews Lake as part of a 1988 study measuring potentially hazardous substances in the lake such as metals, metalloids, and pesticides, in addition to other physiochemical properties, but none were found to be of a level of concern except for selenium. This led the scientists to conclude that selenium was the direct cause of fish kills in the lake. Selenium was found to be the only inorganic element of an elevated concentration among the 16 elements that were measured in a 1985 review.

In 1986, the coal-fired power plant stopped releasing selenium rich wastewater into the lake and instead sent dry ash waste to a landfill for disposal. In the following years, sport fish, like bluegill and largemouth bass, were stocked and were successfully re-established in the lake. Selenium concentrations in the water were measured at less than 1 microgram per liter in 1996 compared to a high of 20 micrograms per liter during the period of selenium loading into the system. Additionally, selenium concentrations in fish tissues were found to be 85-95% lower in 1996 compared with the period of active wastewater loading into the lake. Despite the decrease in selenium concentrations in the water and in fish tissue, reproductive impairment was still observed in fish ten years after the wastewater release was halted. This was due to the tendency selenium has to accumulate in sediments and slowly release back into the food web. The presence of high selenium concentrations in sediments at the bottom of the lake also poses risk for quick reintroduction into the lake's food web if there were a disturbance event like a storm that mobilized the sediments. Other factors extending the time it took the lake to recover was how long it takes the lake to flush out contaminated water because of its long retention time and the low rates of new water inflow both of which helped selenium persist in the lake ecosystem.

=== Selenium Pollution ===
Selenium pollution

=== Recovery ===
A 1996 report written by A. Dennis Lemly documented the recovery status of Belews Lake with reference to water and surrounding ecosystems. Although selenium concentrations have declined substantially in the water and fish, evidence of toxicity remains even ten years after the selenium inputs were stopped. There is still a possibility that selenium could affect fish due to the longevity of exposure; however, there has been slow recovery towards a thriving ecosystem. Time remains the most important factor in supporting the full recovery of the lake and its ecosystem, as the community has regained a mix of species. Most of the numbers demonstrate that recovery is fully completed, and the lake is safe for human recreation and a balanced ecosystem.

== Ecology ==
=== Wildlife ===
Wildlife found in the waters of Belews Lake, along the shore, and in the dense hardwood and pine forest surrounding the lake all contribute to a thriving ecological community. Many unique animals and species play crucial roles in maintaining the health of the environment. The most commonly observed animals are species of birds, especially since local conservancies have been established to protect the woodland habitats. Waterbird species that can be found closest to the water consist of loons, great blue herons, great egrets, and mallards. The surrounding forests support woodpeckers, goldfinches, nuthatches, wrens, towhees, wild turkeys, and bald eagles and ospreys, which can be spotted along the shoreline.

In addition to birds, mammals make up a significant portion of the wildlife in the forests around the lake. White-tailed deer are commonly spotted grazing among the tree lines in the early morning and around dusk. Squirrels, rabbits, chipmunks, groundhogs, foxes, coyotes, and skunks scamper across the forests as well. Moving closer to the shoreline, we can find beavers and river otters, as they are swimming or building lodges.

These ecosystems work together to provide a flourishing environment, as without the wildlife around the lake the reptiles and amphibians wouldn't be able to survive. These consist of Eastern Box and Snapping Turtles, as well as, a few types of snakes. The lake also contains a variety of fish, with the most common being several species of bass, along with types of catfish, crappie, sunfish, and occasionally white perch.

=== Plant life ===
Belews Lake flourishes with the abundance of plant life, characterized by its surrounding forests, native wildflowers, and aquatic vegetation. As mentioned above, the shoreline is bordered by hardwood forests; the native species known to dominate are oak, hickory, and beech trees. Alongside the trees, native ferns, grasses, and short-stature woodland species thrive under the tree canopy, contributing to the lake and Piedmont forest ecosystems.

=== Other ecological concerns ===
In 2011, a species of bass called Alabama bass was illegally introduced to Belews Lake for sportfishing. In 2017, a dramatic decrease in the Largemouth bass population in Belews Lake was observed while the number of invasive Alabama bass rose quickly. There are concerns that smallmouth bass may also be eradicated from the lake because of interbreeding and competition with Alabama Bass. To address this issue, North Carolina officials eliminated catch limits on the number and size of Alabama bass that can be caught from Belews Lake to help mitigate the ecological damage these invasive fish cause. A study undertaken at Lake Norman, another reservoir in North Carolina created by Duke Energy, found the introduction of Alabama bass caused a significant shift in species composition and a decline in Largemouth bass population over ten years that never recovered.

== Human use and recreation ==
Belews Lake serves as a mutli-purpose reservoir, with not only supplying cooling water for the Power Station but providing key aspects of popularity for the community. As previously stated, the lake has four main boat ramps that provide access for people to launch boats, paddleboards, and kayacks. These access points support common activities that are common along the lake, such as swimming, water sports, and fishing.

There are not many houses along the shorelines of the lake due to the Belews Creek Power Station owning most of the shoreline for industrial purposes. Despite the limited residential areas surrounding the lake, the presence of human use and recreation is still significant. J. Dudley Watts Jr. Belews Lake Park was established in 2025 to support for the community to partake in walking trails, fishing, and sitting along the lake.
