= Poplar Springs, Stokes County, North Carolina =

Poplar Springs
- Unincorporated community
- Location within the state of North Carolina Poplar Springs (the United States)
- Coordinates: 36°16′48″N 80°19′15″W
- Country: United States
- State: North Carolina
- County: Stokes
- Elevation: 1,060 ft (320 m)
- Time zone: UTC-5 (Eastern (EST))
  - Summer (DST): UTC-4 (EDT)
- ZIP code: 27021
- Area code: 336
- GNIS feature ID: 1022045

Poplar Springs is an unincorporated community in Stokes County, North Carolina, United States, approximately two miles east of King, on North Carolina State Highway 66.
