= Mount Olive, Stokes County, North Carolina =

Mount Olive
- Unincorporated community
- Location within the state of North Carolina Mount Olive (the United States)
- Coordinates: 36°19′40″N 80°20′11″W
- Country: United States
- State: North Carolina
- County: Stokes
- Elevation: 1,129 ft (344 m)
- Time zone: UTC-5 (Eastern (EST))
  - Summer (DST): UTC-4 (EDT)
- ZIP code: 27021
- GNIS feature ID: 990458

Mount Olive is an unincorporated community in Stokes County, North Carolina, United States, approximately five miles north of King on North Carolina State Highway 66.

It is not to be confused with the headquarters of the Mount Olive Pickle Company, which is located in Mount Olive, Wayne County, North Carolina.
