= Hartman, North Carolina =

Hartman
- Unincorporated community
- Location within the state of North Carolina
- Coordinates: 36°25′19″N 80°10′19″W
- Country: United States
- State: North Carolina
- County: Stokes
- Time zone: UTC-5 (Eastern (EST))
  - Summer (DST): UTC-4 (EDT)

Hartman is an unincorporated community in Stokes County, North Carolina, United States, near Danbury and Hanging Rock State Park.
