= Asbury, Stokes County, North Carolina =

Asbury
- Unincorporated community
- Location within the state of North Carolina
- Coordinates: 36°31′46″N 80°25′16″W
- Country: United States
- State: North Carolina
- County: Stokes
- Time zone: UTC-5 (Eastern (EST))
  - Summer (DST): UTC-4 (EDT)
- ZIP codes: 27030 & 27053

Asbury is a rural unincorporated community in the northwestern corner of Stokes County, North Carolina, United States. It is located about 10 miles north of Pilot Mountain, 11 miles east of Mount Airy, and 1.5 miles south of the Virginia border.

The Smith-Simmons house is a well known Neo-Classical Revival house in the Asbury community.

== See also ==
- Asbury, North Carolina (disambiguation)
