= Pine Hall, North Carolina =

Pine Hall
- Unincorporated community
- Location within the state of North Carolina
- Coordinates: 36°19′28″N 80°2′58″W
- Country: United States
- State: North Carolina
- County: Stokes
- Elevation: 643 ft (196 m)
- Time zone: UTC-5 (Eastern (EST))
  - Summer (DST): UTC-4 (EDT)
- ZIP code: 27042
- GNIS feature ID: 992247

Pine Hall is an unincorporated community in Stokes County, North Carolina, United States, approximately ten miles southwest of county seat Danbury, near Belews Lake. Danbury and Sandy Ridge are to the north, with Stokesdale to the east. Kernersville and Walkertown are to the south, with Winston-Salem to the southwest. Walnut Cove and Germanton are located to the west. On March 20, 1998, an EF-1 tornado touched down briefly in the northern part of Pine Hall, north of Route 311 near Morning Star Baptist Church. The walls were knocked from the foundation of the church and windows were blown out because of the pressure. Trees were also knocked and blown over and 3 people were injured. It was on the ground for 1.5 miles before lifting near the Stokes/Rockingham County line. This tornado and system would eventually become the Stoneville Tornado from the 1998 Gainesville-Stoneville tornado outbreak.

Pine Hall, a historic plantation house, bearing the same name was listed on the National Register of Historic Places in 1979.

In 1922, Flake Steele took over Consolidated Brick Co. and bought hundreds of acres containing Triassic shale. Pine Hall Brick Co. moved its offices to Winston-Salem, North Carolina, two years later. In 2021, the company has two plants in Madison, North Carolina, and two in Fairmount, Georgia, and sells its brick products in 35 U.S. states and in other countries.
