= Sandy Ridge, North Carolina =

Sandy Ridge
- Unincorporated community
- Location within the state of North Carolina
- Coordinates: 36°29′56″N 80°6′15″W
- Country: United States
- State: North Carolina
- County: Stokes
- Time zone: UTC-5 (Eastern (EST))
  - Summer (DST): UTC-4 (EDT)
- ZIP codes: 27046
- Area code: 336

Sandy Ridge is an unincorporated community in Stokes County, North Carolina, United States, approximately 8 miles (13 km) northeast of county seat Danbury. Sandy Ridge is 18 miles from Walnut Cove via NC Highway 704 South, NC 772 south, and US 311. It is 8.7 miles from Lawsonville via NC 704. It is 4 miles from the state line with Virginia.
