= Lawsonville, North Carolina =

Lawsonville
- Unincorporated community
- Location within the state of North Carolina
- Coordinates: 36°29′20″N 80°13′57″W
- Country: United States
- State: North Carolina
- County: Stokes
- Time zone: UTC-5 (Eastern (EST))
  - Summer (DST): UTC-4 (EDT)
- ZIP codes: 27022

Lawsonville is an unincorporated community in Stokes County, North Carolina, United States, approximately ten miles north-northwest of the county seat of Danbury on North Carolina State Highway 8. Lawsonville has a dedicated, county-funded fire department, and residents have 24-hour access to emergency services.

== Education ==
Lawsonville's public school system is overseen by the Stokes County Schools Board of Education. In 2023, the Board of Education voted to close the Lawsonville elementary school at the end of the 2023-24 school year. Current students were reassigned to one of the two other local elementary schools, based on home addresses.

The Lawsonville elementary school building became the new home to Meadowbrook Academy, a public educational facility that serves middle and high schoolers who struggle in traditional public school settings. In 2024, the Board of Education voted to rename Meadowbrook Academy to Stokes County Academy.

== Culture ==
In the fall Lawsonville hosts an annual Foothill Farm Festival.
