= Great Wagon Road =

Trail used by settlers in colonial America to go south

The Great Wagon Road, also known as the Philadelphia Wagon Road, is a historic trail in the Eastern United States that was first traveled by indigenous tribes and later by explorers, settlers, soldiers, and travelers during the colonial era. It extended more than 800 miles (1,300 km) north to south along the eastern seaboard, from British Pennsylvania to North Carolina via the Great Appalachian Valley and from there further south to Georgia.

== History ==
1751 Fry-Jefferson map depicting the Virginia Colony and surrounding provinces.

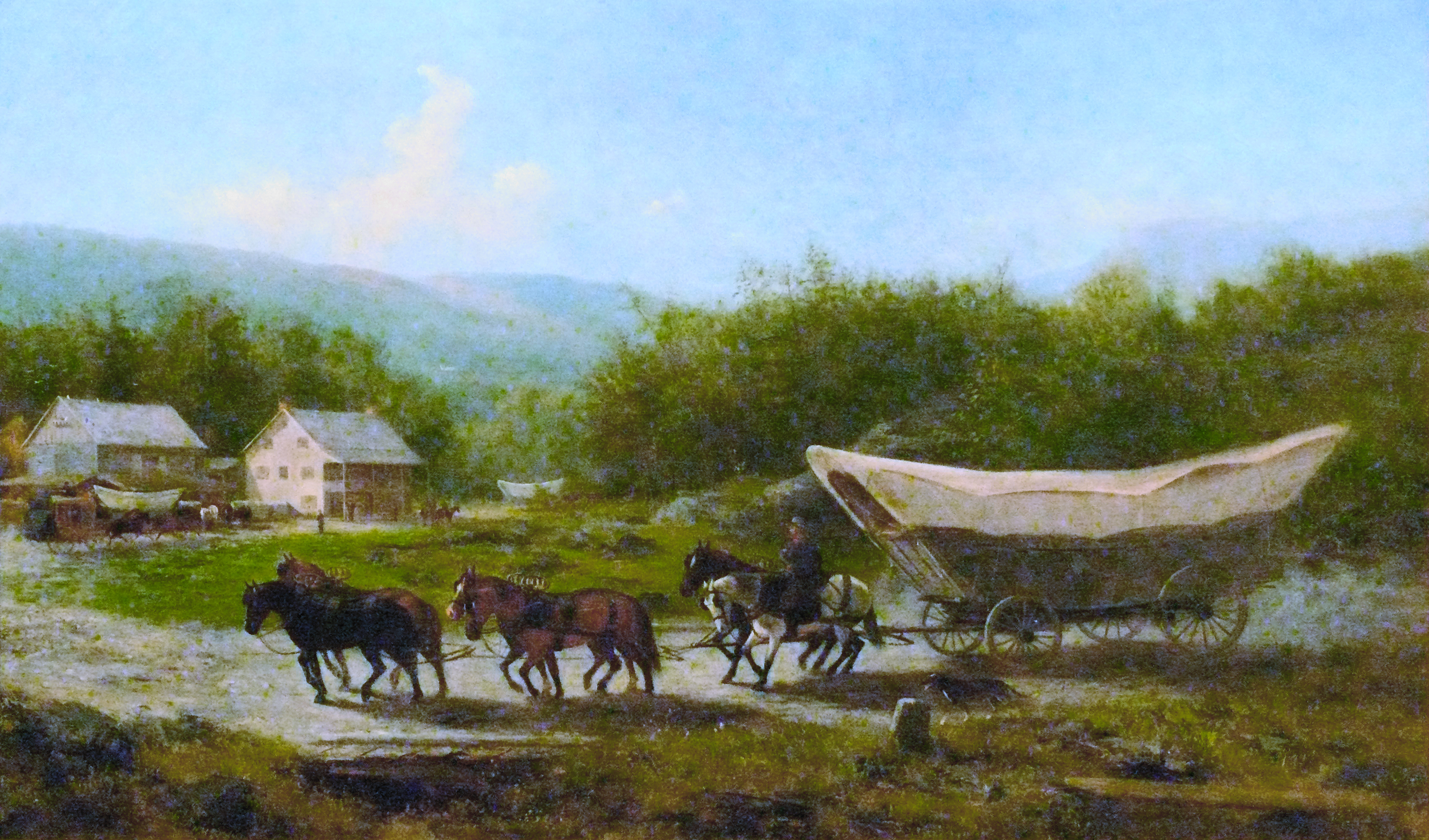
Conestoga wagons on the Great Road

The heavily traveled Great Wagon Road was the primary route for the early settlement of the Southern United States, particularly the "backcountry". Although a wide variety of settlers traveled southward on the road, two dominant cultures emerged. The German Palatines and Scotch-Irish immigrants arrived in huge numbers because of bloody religious conflicts and persecution of Protestants by monarchies in Great Britain and Europe. The mostly Protestant German Palatines (also known as Pennsylvania Dutch) tended to find rich farmland and work it zealously to become stable and prosperous. The other group, mostly Protestant Presbyterians known as Scotch-Irish, tended to be restless, clannish, fiercely independent, and nurtured a centuries old animosity with the British Crown. The Scotch-Irish made up a substantial portion of the Continental Army and the state militia in the American Revolutionary War. They went on to form what became the backbone of Appalachian Culture. Partly because of the language difference, the two groups tended to keep to themselves.

Beginning at the port of Philadelphia, where many immigrants entered the colonies, the Great Wagon Road passed through the towns of Lancaster and York in southeastern Pennsylvania. Turning southwest, the road crossed the Potomac River and entered the Shenandoah Valley near present-day Martinsburg, West Virginia. It continued south in the valley via the Great Warriors' Trail (also called the Indian Road), an existing route established by centuries of Indian travel over ancient trails created by migrating buffalo herds. The Shenandoah portion of the road is also known as the Valley Pike. In 1744, the Treaty of Lancaster established colonists' rights to settle along the Indian Road. Although traffic on the road increased dramatically after 1744, it was reduced to a trickle during the French and Indian War (Seven Years' War) from 1756 to 1763. After the war ended, it was said to be the most heavily traveled main road in America.

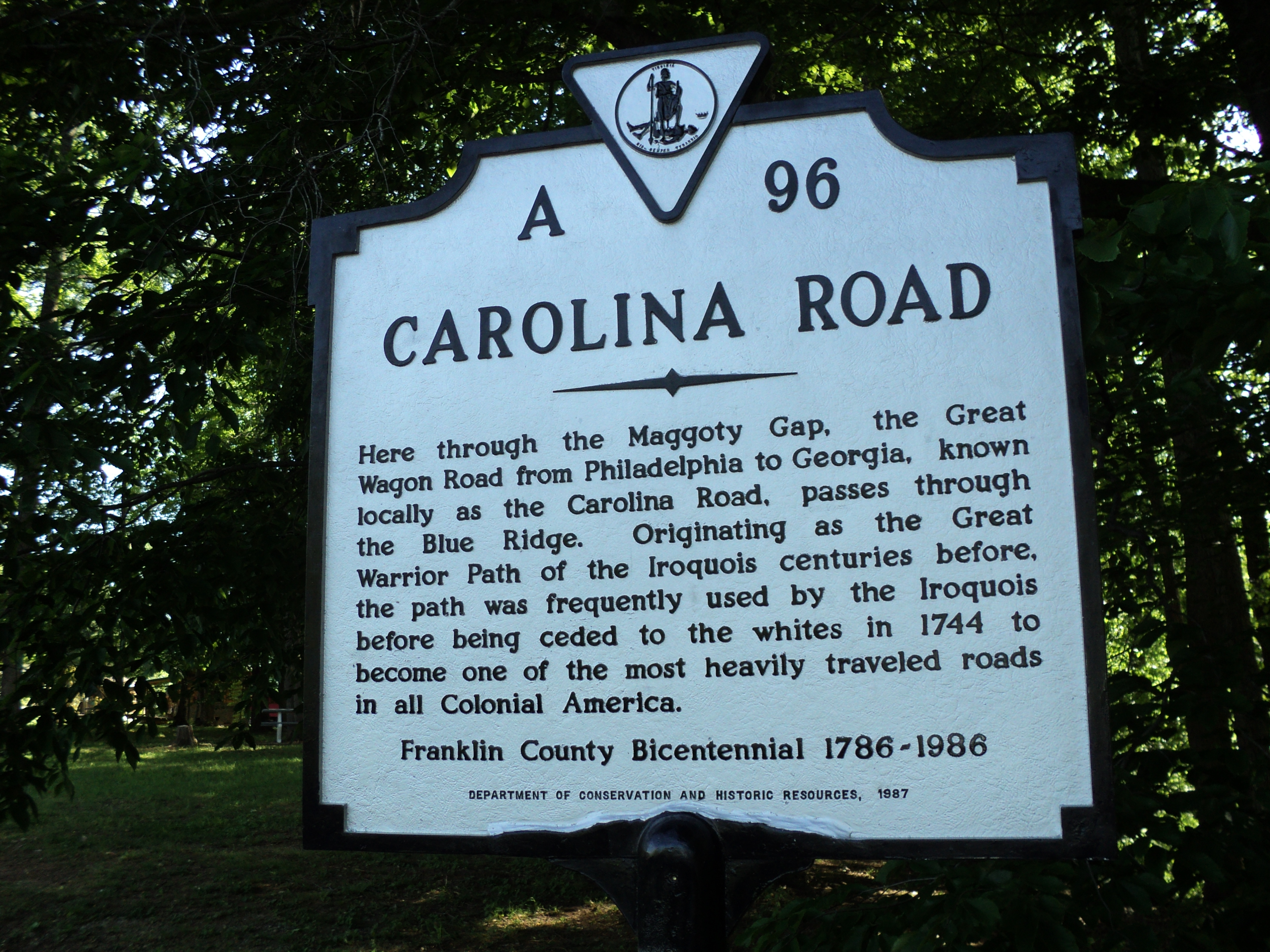
Historic marker for the Carolina Road, Franklin County, Virginia

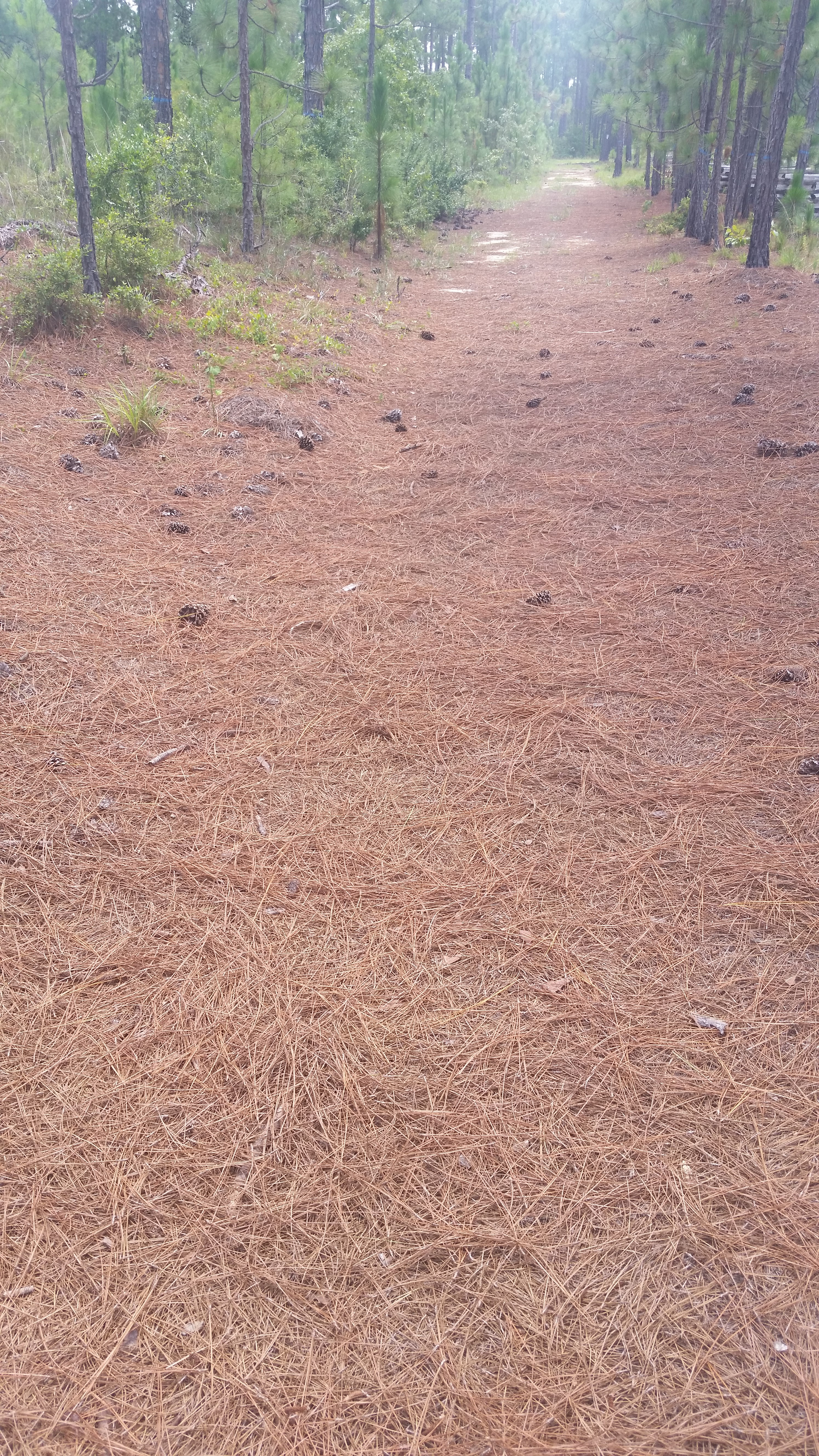
Remnant of the Great Wagon Road at Camden Battlefield, South Carolina

South of the Shenandoah Valley, the road reached the Roanoke River at the town of Big Lick (present-day Roanoke). South of Roanoke, the Great Wagon Road was also called the Carolina Road. At Roanoke, a road forked southwest, leading into the upper New River Valley and on through Abingdon, Virginia, to the Holston River in the upper Tennessee Valley. From there, the Wilderness Road led into Kentucky, ending at the Ohio River where flatboats were available for further travel into the Midwest and downriver to New Orleans.

After 1748, from Big Lick/Roanoke the Great Wagon Road passed through the Maggoty Gap (also called Maggodee) to the east side of the Blue Ridge Mountains. Continuing south through the Piedmont region, it passed through the present-day North Carolina towns of Winston-Salem, Salisbury, and Charlotte, and sites of earlier Indian settlements on the historic Indian Trading Path. The Great Wagon Road ultimately reached Augusta, Georgia, on the Savannah River, a distance of more than 800 miles (1,300 km) from Philadelphia.

Despite its current name, the southern part of this road was not passable by wagons until later colonial times. The 1751 Fry-Jefferson map on this page notes the term "Waggon" only north of Winchester, Virginia. In 1753, a group of wagon travelers reported that "the good road ended at Augusta" (now Staunton, Virginia), although they did keep going all the way to Winston-Salem. By all accounts, it was never a comfortable route. The lines of settlers' covered wagons moving south were matched by a line of wagons full of agricultural produce heading north to urban markets; these were interspersed with enormous herds of cattle, hogs, and other livestock being driven north to market. Although there surely would have been pleasant areas for travel, road conditions also could vary from deep mud to thick dust, mixed with animal waste. In general, travelers preferred high and dry roads, but they also needed regularly spaced water sources for their horses (and for themselves). Inns were generally built near flowing springs, but provided only the most basic food and a space to sleep.

Today, it is possible to experience many segments of the old road by car, by bike, or even on foot. Although most of the road has seen profound changes, some areas retain scenery much as the pioneers encountered it.

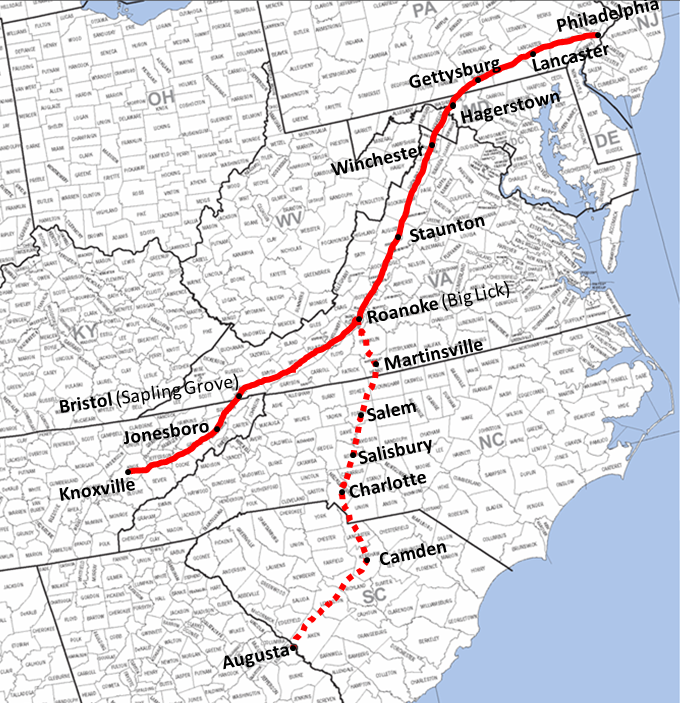
The Great Valley Road used by settlers in the 1700s America. See Google map of this area.

== Road description ==
The following tables summarize the segments of the Great Wagon Road, with links to details on each section and a Google map showing the current roads and a satellite view of the area.

Note: The segments and distances are approximations; actual paths varied constantly with fallen trees, floods, etc.

Order	Segment	Date	Approximate distance (miles)	Approximate distance (km)	Google Maps link
1	#Philadelphia to York, Pennsylvania	circa 1754	94	151	Map
2	#York, Pennsylvania to Winchester, Virginia via Old Monocacy Road	circa 1730	117	188	Map
3	#York, Pennsylvania to Winchester, Virginia via Nichols Gap	circa 1754	114	183	Map
4	#York, Pennsylvania to Winchester, Virginia via Black's Gap	circa 1754	112	180	Map
5	#Winchester to Roanoke, Virginia	circa 1754	187	301	Map
6	#Roanoke, Virginia to Wachovia, North Carolina	circa 1754	128	206	Map
7	#Wachovia to Salisbury, North Carolina via the Trading Ford	circa 1765	46	74	Map
8	#Wachovia to Salisbury, North Carolina via the Shallow Ford	circa 1765	55	89	Map
9	#Salisbury, North Carolina to Charlotte, North Carolina	circa 1775	38	61	Map
10	#Charlotte, North Carolina to Augusta, Georgia via Camden and Columbia, South Carolina	circa 1775	190	310	Map
11	#Charlotte, North Carolina to Augusta, Georgia via Union and Columbia, South Carolina	circa 1775	209	336	Map
12	#Alternate path from Union, South Carolina to Augusta, Georgia, via Pelzer, South Carolina	circa 1775	187	301	Map

=== Philadelphia to York, Pennsylvania ===
Location	Present-day road segment number	Present-day road segment name	Distance covered	Remarks
Philadelphia, Market Street, at Delaware River				
	State Road 3 (PA-3)	Market St		By about 1740, milestones were placed along the side of the Great Wagon Road to Lancaster (known as the "King's Road", or occasionally the "Conestoga Road"), each with a chiseled number, indicating the distance in miles from the Quaker meeting house at Second Street and High Street (now Market Street) in Philadelphia (example: "20 M to P").
Schuylkill River Ferry (now a bridge)				
	PA-3	Market St	0.7 miles (1.1 km)	The Strasburg Wagon Road (first used 1716, rebuilt 1790) branched here, continuing along present-day PA-3, PA-162, PA-372, and PA-741 through West Chester, Parkesburg, Gap, and Strasburg, Pennsylvania, from where a track continued through Willow Street village to the Susquehanna River at the mouth of the Conestoga River. This road followed roughly the ancient Great Minquas Path, also known occasionally as the Conestoga Path. In 1716, John Miller became the first regular wagon driver between Philadelphia and Lancaster County; he used this Strasburg Road. By 1717, there were two or three more wagons in use, including the first "Conestoga" wagon.
	PA-3005	Lancaster Ave	2 miles (3 km)	Detour around Drexel University (founded 1891). This is where the 1795 Philadelphia and Lancaster Turnpike began.
Crossing of Girard Avenue, Philadelphia				
	US-30	Lancaster Ave	2.4 miles (3.9 km)	
Montgomery County line; at US-1 (City Ave)				The Lincoln Highway (1916) from Trenton, New Jersey (US-1) joined the Lancaster Turnpike (1790) here.
	US-30	Lincoln Hwy	10 miles (16 km)	This section (Old Lancaster Road) was relocated in many places in 1830 by construction of the Pennsylvania Railroad "Main Line".
Delaware County line; at County Line Rd				
	US-30	Lincoln Hwy	9 miles (14 km)	
Chester County line; at Sugartown Rd				
	US-30	Lancaster Ave	11 miles (18 km)	
Crossing of US-202				
	US-30 Business Route	Lincoln Hwy	7 miles (11 km)	
Downingtown (formerly Milltown), Pennsylvania (estab. c. 1716); Brandywine Creek Ford (now a bridge)				The Philadelphia and Lancaster Turnpike (built 1795) branched here, continuing along US-30 Business until rejoining US-30 12 miles (19 km) west of here. US-30 now follows its path until meeting PA-462 at Lancaster. The turnpike continued along PA-462 to end at the Susquehanna River in Columbia, Pennsylvania. After 1913, the turnpike was renamed as a section of the Lincoln Highway.
	US-322	Manor Ave	0.7 miles (1.1 km)	In 1803, the Horseshoe Pike (now US-322) was built from here to Ephrata and Harrisburg, Pennsylvania.
	PA-4015	Edges Mill Rd	1.7 miles (2.7 km)	
	PA-340	Kings Road	12 miles (19 km)	The King's Road was built from Philadelphia to Lancaster in 1733. It became a section of the Great Wagon Road.
	PA-340	Old Philadelphia Pike	10 miles (16 km)	PA-340 departs from the original Harrisburg Road at White Horse, Pennsylvania. Called "Old Peter's Road" (for Peter Bezaillon, who had a trading post at the end of the road), this packhorse road turned northwest through Springville, Groffdale, and Center Square, then over a future quarry to ford the Conestoga River, continuing south of Lancaster Airport to Mount Joy, then along Donegal Springs Road and Stackstown Road to the Susquehanna River at Bainbridge (formerly Conoy), Pennsylvania. Much of it is obliterated now by cultivated fields and residential developments.
Lancaster, Pennsylvania (estab. 1730); Conestoga River Ford (now a bridge); Historic Fork of the Great Wagon Road				Lancaster is where blacksmiths fabricated the famous heavy Conestoga wagons and supplied horses that were locally bred especially to pull them in lieu of oxen, commonly with a team of six animals. In 1734, a segment of the original Great Wagon Road, the King's Road, now PA-230 (Old Harrisburg Pike), was built from the center of Lancaster through Mount Joy to Pine Ford (now a bridge) across Swatara Creek at Middletown, and past the Harris ferry (established 1712, now Harrisburg). Also, in 1736 there was built a well-used wagon road (now US-222 and US-422) from Bethlehem, Pennsylvania, to Harris ferry. Eventually from Harrisburg the King's Road continued to Carlisle, Shippensburg, and Chambersburg, then on to the Potomac River. In 1758 the Forbes military wagon road was built, branching west from Chambersburg to Fort Loudon, Pennsylvania, and on to Pittsburgh. Heavy wagon traffic carried supplies from Philadelphia through Lancaster and Harrisburg to the General Forbes army, which was based in Carlisle. (The 1751 Fry-Jefferson map is inaccurate for western Pennsylvania, showing only the approximate placement of segments of roads. For example, it shows the road from Shippensburg running too far west and ending at present-day Fort Frederick, Pennsylvania.) Much later, in 1806, a group of Conestoga wagon craftsmen moved from Lancaster to the Harrisburg area where they set up business; the settlement was named Mechanicsburg in 1820 because of all their shops there.
	PA-462	King St + Columbia Ave + Lancaster Ave + Chestnut St	14 miles (23 km)	
Columbia, Pennsylvania (estab. 1726); Susquehanna River Ferry (now a bridge)				The road from Philadelphia to here was paved with stones in 1795, and the railroad from Philadelphia to here was completed in 1834.
Wrightsville, Pennsylvania (estab. 1806) (formerly Wright's Ferry) -- York County line (estab. 1749)				
	PA-462	Lincoln Hwy + Market St	13 miles (21 km)	
York, Pennsylvania (estab. 1741); Codorus Creek ford (now a bridge)				

=== York, Pennsylvania to Winchester, Virginia via Old Monocacy Road ===
Continuing west at York, Pennsylvania:

Location	Present-day road segment number	Present-day road segment name	Distance covered	Remarks
York, Pennsylvania (estab. 1741); Codorus Creek ford (now a bridge)				
	PA-462	Market St	4 miles (6 km)	
	US-30		1.4 miles (2.3 km)	
Historic Fork of the Great Wagon Road; Junction of PA-116 at US-30				The later Great Wagon Road (built 1747) continued on from here along US-30. But the old Monocacy Road via Frederick, Maryland, continued as described below.
	PA-116	York Road	13.4 miles (21.6 km)	
Hanover, Pennsylvania (estab. 1763); Adams County				
	PA-194	Frederick St + Hanover Pike + King St	7.2 miles (11.6 km)	
Littlestown, Pennsylvania (estab. 1760)				
	PA-194	King St + Francis Scott Key Highway	2.7 miles (4.3 km)	
Maryland State Line (estab. 1767); Carroll County				This is the historic Mason–Dixon line.
	MD-194	Francis Scott Key Highway + York St	5.2 miles (8.4 km)	
Taneytown, Maryland (estab. 1754)				
	MD-194	Frederick St + Francis Scott Key Highway + Woodsboro Pike	4.6 miles (7.4 km)	
Big Pipe Creek				
		Keysville Bruceville Rd + Sixes Bridge Rd + Mumma Ford Rd	3.7 miles (6.0 km)	
Monocacy River; Mumma Ford (now a bridge); Frederick County				
		Mumma Ford Rd + Appolds Rd + Old Frederick Rd + Rocky Ridge Rd (MD-77) + Long Rd + Jimtown Rd (MD-550) + Hessong Bridge Rd	11 miles (18 km)	A map published by Tracey and Dern shows a road, referred to as the "Manor" Monocacy Road, continuing south on Old Frederick Rd to Frederick. The map, however, shows the "German" Monocacy Road (to the Opequon Settlement at Winchester) turning onto Rocky Ridge Rd and continuing as described below.
Lewistown, Maryland (estab. 1841)				
		Fish Hatchery Rd + Bethel Rd + Yellow Springs Rd	9.4 miles (15.1 km)	
Frederick, Maryland (estab. 1745); Fort Detrick				The original path of the Monocacy wagon road is presently unknown for this vicinity.
		Montevue Ln + Shookstown Rd + Waverly Dr	2 miles (3.2 km)	
Junction of US-40 and Alt US-40				From Frederick, there was also another route to the south, generally followed by US-15. This was called the "Carolina Road" or occasionally the "High Road" through Virginia; it crossed the Potomac River via Noland's ferry south of Point of Rocks. At its southern end, from Clarksville, Virginia, it entered North Carolina about 15 miles (24 km) west of the Fall Line Road (now US-1) and 80 miles (130 km) east of the Great Wagon Road. From that entry point, it was possible to travel west through Hillsborough and Greensboro, to Salem or Salisbury, North Carolina, and rejoin the Great Wagon Road. However, the Monocacy Road continued as described below.
		Old National Pike (Alt US-40) + Main St	5 miles (8.0 km)	
Middletown, Maryland (estab. 1767) -- Catoctin Creek ford (now a bridge)				After Harpers Ferry began operating legally in 1761 (intermittent ferry service existed there since 1730), the road through Middletown was no longer needed; wagon traffic followed the path of US-340 from Frederick to Harpers Ferry. From there, it joined the road from Alexandria, Virginia, west of Vestal's Pass (now Keyes Gap) at Charles Town; next, south of Middleway, it connected with the old Monocacy Road and proceeded directly on it to Winchester, Virginia. It was about 105 miles (169 km) from York to Winchester via Harpers Ferry.
		Main St + Marker Rd. + Bolivar Rd. + Reno Monument Rd.	3.7 miles (6.0 km)	
Fox's Gap (at Appalachian Trail crossing)				
		Reno Monument Rd + Mt. Carmel Church Rd (MD-858) + Dogstreet Rd +	4.5 miles (7.2 km)	Fording Dog Creek (twice) and Little Antietam Creek (all now bridged).
Fork in the road				Northward from the fork, following Dogstreet Rd, another wagon road continued on through the future Keedysville and Williamsport, but the Monocacy road continued southward as follows.
		Geeting Rd + Porterstown Rd + Shepherdstown Pike + Main St	3.2 miles (5.1 km)	Fording Antietam Creek (now a bridge).
Sharpsburg, Maryland (estab. 1763)				
	MD-34	Main St + Shepherdstown Pike	3.3 miles (5.3 km)	
Potomac River; West Virginia state line; Berkeley County;				Samuel Taylor's ferry originally operated here (1734) and later Thomas Swearingen's ferry (1755). "Packhorse Ford" is nearby. A 1736 Benjamin Winslow map and the 1751 Fry-Jefferson map show the ferry crossing at the Spurgent property.
Shepherdstown, West Virginia (estab. 1762)				
	MD-34	Duke St + Kearneysville Pike (WV-380) + Leetown Rd + Queen St	13 miles (21 km)	
Middleway, West Virginia (estab. 1734)				Settlement was originally called Smithfield
		Queen St + Box Factory Rd + Leetown Rd + Summit Point Rd	5.4 miles (8.7 km)	
Virginia State Line; Clarke County				
	VA-672	Swimley Rd	1 mile (1.6 km)	
Junction with Road from Alexandria (through Vestal's Gap, now Keyes Gap)				This is shown on the 1751 Fry Jefferson map. After 1761, traffic from Harpers Ferry also arrived here.
		Old Charlestown Rd (VA-761) + Crums Church Rd (VA-632)	7.4 miles (11.9 km)	
Junction with Road from Alexandria (through Williams Gap, now Snickers Gap)				This is shown on the 1751 Fry Jefferson map.
	VA-7	Harry Byrd Highway	2.9 miles (4.7 km)	
Opequon Creek Ford; Frederick County				Now bridged
	VA-7	Berryville Pike + National Ave + Piccadilly St	5 miles (8.0 km)	
Winchester, Virginia (orig. Frederick Town, estab. 1738); at US-11, Cameron St—Historic junction of the Great Wagon Road				This is where the Monocacy Road (and also the Harper's Ferry Road) from York, Pennsylvania, joined the Great Wagon Road.

=== York, Pennsylvania to Winchester, Virginia via Nichols Gap ===
Continuing west at York, Pennsylvania:

Location	Present-day road segment number	Present-day road segment name	Distance covered	Remarks
York, Pennsylvania (estab. 1741); Codorus Creek ford (now a bridge)				
	PA-462	Market St	4 miles (6 km)	
	US-30		1.4 miles (2.3 km)	
Historic Fork of the Great Wagon Road; Junction of PA-116 at US-30				Another early wagon route, the "Monocacy Road" (built before 1739), went from here to Winchester, Virginia. It was about 114 miles (183 km) from York to Winchester, using this road. From York, however, the Great Wagon Road continued west (US-30) as described below.
	US-30		11 miles (18 km)	
Beaver Creek ford (now a bridge); Adams County line				
	US-30		9 miles (14 km)	
Historic Fork of the Great Wagon Road; Swift Run Road at US-30				Another equally important path of the Great Wagon Road, the Black's Gap Road continued west from here (after 1747) as described in the next table below. It was shown on a 1775 version of a 1770 map by William Scull.
	US-30	Lincoln Highway	7 miles (11 km)	
Gettysburg (estab. 1780)				
	PA-116	Lincoln Highway + Baltimore St + Middle St + Fairfield Rd + Main St	8.4 miles (13.5 km)	
Fairfield (estab. 1784)				
		Main St (PA-116) + Iron Springs Rd + Gum Springs Rd + Furnace Rd + Charmian Rd	8 miles (13 km)	
Nichols Gap (also called Willoughby's Gap in the past, now Monterey Pass or Blue Ridge Summit); Charmian Rd intersection with Buchanan Trail (PA-16)				
		Old Rte 16	2.3 miles (3.7 km)	
Rouzerville (Waynesboro)				
		Waterloo Rd + Harbaugh Church Rd + Midvale Rd	1.9 miles (3.1 km)	
Maryland State Line (estab. 1767); Washington County				This is the historic Mason–Dixon line.
	MD-418	Ringgold Pike	3.5 miles (5.6 km)	
Ringgold				
		Ringgold Pike (MD-418) + Ringgold St + Leiter St (MD-805)	3.1 miles (5.0 km)	
Leitersburg				
		Leiter St (MD-805) + Leitersburg Pike (MD-60) + Potomac Avenue + Potomac St	6.8 miles (10.9 km)	
Hagerstown				
		Franklin St (US-40) + Prospect St + Virginia Ave (US-11)	5 miles (8.0 km)	
Exit from US-11				This is probably a detour. The original path to Falling Water Road may have been closer to present-day Williamsport.
		Governor Lane Blvd + Spielman Rd + Falling Water Rd + a dirt road	7 miles (11 km)	The last half mile is now an inaccessible dirt road on private property with locked gates. But it is possible now to continue across the river via a detour over the bridge at Williamsport.
Potomac River; Williams Ferry; West Virginia state line; Berkeley County;				Williams Ferry was shown here on a 1736 map by Benjamin Winslow. However, no trace remains of any direct route to here from Hagerstown. Most wagons from Nichol's Gap may have crossed the Potomac at Williamsport instead of here.
		Foster Drive + Encampment Road	0.3 miles (0.48 km)	
Foster Drive (access via Encampment Road), Falling Waters, West Virginia; Historic junction of the Great Wagon Road				This is the vicinity where the Nichol's Gap Road from York, Pennsylvania, presumably joined the combined Harrisburg Road and Black's Gap Road (which was also from York). Williams Ferry was shown here on a 1736 map by Benjamin Winslow.
	US-11	Williamsport Pike + Queen St	9.5 miles (15.3 km)	
Martinsburg, West Virginia (estab. 1778)				
	US-11	King St + Winchester Ave	13 miles (21 km)	
Virginia state line; Frederick County				
	US-11	Martinsburg Pike + Cameron St	10 miles (16 km)	
Winchester, Virginia (orig. Frederick Town, estab. 1738); Historic junction of the Great Wagon Road				This is where the Monocacy Road (and after 1761 the Harper's Ferry Road) from York, Pennsylvania, joined the Great Wagon Road.

=== York, Pennsylvania to Winchester, Virginia via Black's Gap ===
Continuing west at York, Pennsylvania:

Location	Present-day road segment number	Present-day road segment name	Distance covered	Remarks
York, Pennsylvania (estab. 1741); Codorus Creek ford (now a bridge)				
	PA-462	Market St	4 miles (6 km)	
	US-30		1.4 miles (2.3 km)	
Historic Fork of the Great Wagon Road; junction of PA-116 at US-30				Another early wagon route, the "Monocacy Road" (built before 1739), went from here to Winchester, Virginia. It was about 114 miles (183 km) from York to Winchester, using this road. From York, however, the Great Wagon Road continued west (US-30) as described below.
	US-30		11 miles (18 km)	
Beaver Creek ford (now a bridge); Adams County line				
	US-30		9 miles (14 km)	
Historic Fork of the Great Wagon Road; Swift Run Road at US-30				Another equally important path of the Great Wagon Road, the Nichol's Gap Road (built 1747) went from here to reach Winchester, Virginia. This route was shown on the 1751 Fry-Jefferson map. The alternate path of the Great Wagon Road, however, continued west from here (after 1747) as described below. It was shown on a 1776 version of a 1770 map by William Scull.
		Swift Run Rd + Shrivers Corner Rd	0.7 miles (1.1 km)	It was about 110 miles (180 km) from York, Pennsylvania, to Winchester, Virginia, using this road. In 1811, it was replaced by the Gettysburg and Chambersburg Turnpike.
		Goldenville Rd	4.4 miles (7.1 km)	
		Hilltown Rd	5.3 miles (8.5 km)	
		Lincoln Hwy	3.3 miles (5.3 km)	In 1811, the Gettysburg and Chambersburg Turnpike was built through here, moving the Great Wagon Road to present-day US-30. It was renamed as a section of the Lincoln Highway in 1916.
	US-30	Lincoln Hwy	2.2 miles (3.5 km)	
Black's Gap (also called Cashtown Pass or Wetherspoon's Gap) in South Mountain; Franklin County (estab. 1784), previously Cumberland County (estab. 1750)				In 1744, the Treaty of Lancaster, an agreement with the five Iroquois nations, legalized settlement in the Great Appalachian Valley west of here.
	US-30	Lincoln Hwy	2.9 miles (4.7 km)	
Intersection of PA-997 (Anthony Highway) at US-30				After 1790, another main wagon road (now Black Gap Road, PA-997) ran northwest from here through Upper Strasburg, Fannettsburg, and Burnt Cabins, then followed the present-day Pennsylvania Turnpike as far as Breezewood and followed US-30 from there to Pittsburgh. This route bypassed Chambersburg and Fort Loudon, saving considerable toll and forage expenses for Conestoga wagon teamsters traveling between Philadelphia and Pittsburgh. In 1768, valley settlers petitioned for a road from here to Chambersburg; it was approved in 1772 and ordered built in 1786. Eventually, in 1811 it became part of the Gettysburg to Chambersburg Turnpike (now US-30), a principal route to Pittsburgh. Chambersburg, Pennsylvania (estab. 1730), 11 miles (18 km) west of here, became a fork of the Great Wagon Road after 1786. This is the junction with the Harrisburg-Carlisle-Shippensburg-Chambersburg (US-11) branch of the Great Wagon Road that had been built to the Potomac River in 1744. The French and Indian War (Seven Years' War) disrupted traffic on the Great Wagon Road from 1756 to 1763. The population of Franklin County (the Chambersburg area) in 1756 was 3,000; by 1760 it was down to 300. The Forbes military wagon road (now US-30), built in 1758 to attack the French, branched west from Chambersburg through Fort Loudon and McConnellsburg to present-day Pittsburgh. Improved in 1785, it then carried heavy pioneer traffic to Ohio until the National Road (US-40) was completed to the Ohio River in 1818 and the Erie Canal was completed to the Great Lakes in 1834. The earlier Great Wagon Road to the south from here, however, continued as described below. A 1770 map by William Scull showed the road bypassing Chambersburg and running directly from here to intersect with the Harrisburg road (built 1744) in the vicinity of Marion, Pennsylvania (north of Back Creek and Muddy Run). A 1775 version of the map by Robert Sayer and J. Bennett showed John Mushet's tavern at this Marion intersection. Jeremiah Dixon (of Mason-Dixon fame) suggested this be a wagon road in 1767. This route would correspond roughly to present-day Bikle Road to Duffield and onward, south of Falling Spring, to the vicinity of present-day New Franklin and Marion. (The original path of the road has been broken by the construction of a railroad and interstate highway.)
	PA-997	Anthony Hwy	0.6 miles (0.97 km)	
		Bickle Road	1.7 miles (2.7 km)	
		Mont Alto Road	1.2 miles (1.9 km)	
	PA-2020	New Franklin Road	3.3 miles (5.3 km)	
New Franklin, Pennsylvania (settled 1795)				
		New Franklin Road	2.4 miles (3.9 km)	
		Alleman Road	0.8 miles (1.3 km)	
		3rd Street	0.8 miles (1.3 km)	
		Kennedy Street	0.3 miles (0.48 km)	
		Main Street	0.3 miles (0.48 km)	
Marion, Pennsylvania (estab. 1810); Historic junction of the Great Wagon Road				This appears to be the approximate location of John Mushet's inn and the intersection of the road from Philadelphia with the road from Harrisburg, as shown on a 1775 map by Robert Sayer and J. Bennett based on a 1770 map by William Scull. John Mushet's tavern apparently stood near the present-day intersection of Main Street and US-11; a brick house still stands there with a spring-fed stream behind it. John Mushet's property (deeded August 10, 1743) was adjacent to Adam Hoops's property (deeded September 30, 1751), but the 1751 tax rolls had Mushet in Guilford Township and Hoops in Antrim Township; this indicates that the junction was almost at the township boundary line. The map also implies that the Hoops inn was on the west side of the road, approximately at present-day address 6451 S. Main St (US-11). Fifteen Moravian settlers, traveling with a large wagon, noted that they passed by the tavern and stopped briefly at the "German" inn on October 16, 1753; they were on their way from Bethlehem, Pennsylvania, to Wachovia (now Winston-Salem), North Carolina.
	US-11	South Main St + Antrim Way	5.2 miles (8.4 km)	
Greencastle, Pennsylvania (estab. 1782)				
		Williamsport Pike	2 miles (3.2 km)	
Milnor Road Intersection				This was the location of the historic Pawling's Tavern where great amounts of cargo were transferred from wagons to pack horse trains for travel westward into the mountains and from pack horses to wagons for travel east to the cities. There is nothing left of the original buildings.
		Williamsport Pike	2.7 miles (4.3 km)	
Maryland state line (estab. 1767); Washington County				
	MD-63 + US-11	Greencastle Pike + Artizan St + W Potomac St	9.5 miles (15 km)	
Williamsport, Maryland (estab. 1787); Potomac River; Watkins Ferry (now a bridge)				Evan Watkins' ferry was established by law in 1744. At times it was possible to ford Conococheague Creek at the present-day railroad bridge and then to ford the Potomac River just above the mouth of the creek. After 1795, Watkins Ferry became Peter Light's ferry; in 1854 it became Robert Lemen's ferry, which was an improvement because of its attachment to a cable strung across the river. (Before that, they would tow the boat upstream to a release point from which they hoped the current would carry the boat to the right spot on the opposite bank.) Williamsport was named after General Otho Williams, who laid out the town in 1787. Earlier, a settler named John Williams operated a different Potomac River ferry (1731) at Falling Waters near the mouth of Opequon Creek, 5 miles (8 km) downstream from here. (The frequently mentioned "Opequon Settlement" area, in contrast, extended as far south as the headwaters of the creek, at Bartonsville, about 6 miles (10 km) south of Winchester, Virginia.)
West Virginia state line; Berkeley County				
	US-11	Williamsport Pike	4.5 miles (7.2 km)	
Foster Drive (access via Encampment Road), Falling Waters, West Virginia; Historic junction of the Great Wagon Road				This is the vicinity where the Nichol's Gap Road from York, Pennsylvania, presumably joined the combined Harrisburg Road and Black's Gap Road (which was also from York). Williams Ferry was shown here on a 1736 map by Benjamin Winslow.
	US-11	Williamsport Pike + Queen St	9.5 miles (15.3 km)	
Martinsburg, West Virginia (estab. 1778)				
	US-11	King St + Winchester Ave	13 miles (21 km)	
Virginia state line; Frederick County				
	US-11	Martinsburg Pike + Cameron St	10 miles (16 km)	
Winchester, Virginia (orig. Frederick Town, estab. 1738); Historic junction of the Great Wagon Road				This is where the Monocacy Road (and after 1761 the Harper's Ferry Road) from York, Pennsylvania, joined the Great Wagon Road.

=== Winchester to Roanoke, Virginia ===
Continuing south at Winchester, Virginia:

Location	Present-day road segment number	Present-day road segment name	Distance covered	Remarks
Winchester, Virginia (orig. Frederick Town, estab. 1738); Historic junction of the Great Wagon Road				This is where the Monocacy Road (and after 1761 the Harper's Ferry Road) from York, Pennsylvania, joined the Great Wagon Road. Winchester was considered the gateway to the Shenandoah Valley, leading to the Carolina Piedmont, Tennessee, and Kentucky. In the period after the French and Indian War until the Revolutionary War, this Great Wagon Road was said to have been the most heavily traveled main road in all of America. Its eventual decline can be traced to the construction of railroads in the second half of the nineteenth century.
	US-11	Cameron St + Gerard St + Valley Ave + Valley Pike	14 miles (23 km)	
Shenandoah County line (estab. 1772); at Cedar Creek ford (now a bridge)				Brief passage (0.5 mile) through Warren County (estab. 1836) just before the ford.
	US-11	Old Valley Pike + Massanutten St	3 miles (5 km)	
Strasburg, Virginia (estab. 1749)				
	US-11	King St + Old Valley Pike	17 miles (27 km)	There are fords at Tumbling Run, Toms Brook, Jordan Run, Pughs Run, and Narrow Passage Creek. The "Narrow Passage" ridge is just 1 mile north of Edinburg.
Edinburg, Virginia (estab. 1852); Stony Creek ford (now a bridge)				
	US-11	Old Valley Pike	7 miles (11 km)	
Mill Creek ford (now a bridge at Mt. Jackson, Virginia)				
	US-11	Old Valley Pike	1 mile (1.6 km)	
Shenandoah River ford (now a bridge)				
	US-11	Old Valley Pike	10 miles (16 km)	
Rockingham County line (estab. 1778); at Whereman's Run				
	US-11	Lee Hwy	3 miles (5 km)	
Fork in Road; Brocks Gap Road (now VA-259) to West Virginia				
	US-11	Lee Hwy + Main St	11 miles (18 km)	
Harrisonburg, Virginia (estab. 1780)				
	US-11	Main St + Lee Hwy	10 miles (16 km)	
Augusta County line; at VA-690 (estab. 1738)				
	US-11	Main St + Lee Hwy + US-11BUS + Augusta St	14 miles (23 km)	
Staunton, Virginia (orig. Augusta) (estab. 1747)				Fork in road: Left to Waynesboro (US-250), right to Carolina (US-11).
	US-11		0.8 miles (1.3 km)	Lewis Creek ford (now a culvert)
	VA-613 + VA-697	Old Greenville Rd	14 miles (23 km)	Fork at VA-694 (Waynesboro-Middlebrook road); ford at Folly Mills Creek
Greenville, Virginia (estab. 1794); South River ford (now a bridge)				
	US-11	Lee Hwy	6 miles (10 km)	
Rockbridge County line (estab. 1777); Marl Creek ford (now a bridge)				
	US-11	Lee Hwy	22 miles (35 km)	Ford Moores Creek, Marlbrook Creek, Mill Creek
Maury River ford (now a bridge)				
	US-11	Lee Hwy	1 mile (1.6 km)	
Lexington, Virginia (estab. 1777)				
	US-11	Lee Hwy	13 miles (21 km)	
Natural Bridge, Virginia				Over Cedar Creek
	US-11	Lee Hwy	4 miles (6 km)	
Botetourt County line (estab. 1770); at VA-610 (Chambers Rd)				
	US-11	Lee Hwy	7 miles (11 km)	
Buchanan, Virginia (estab. 1832); James River ford (now a bridge)				Looney's ferry was between I-81 and Looney Creek. The ford was between Looney Creek and the present-day US-11 bridge.
	US-11	Main St + Lee Hwy	2.6 miles (4.2 km)	Wagons using the ferry could avoid fording Looney's Creek by following VA-772 (Long Run Road) from the ferry to Looney's mill.
Looney Creek ford (now a bridge)				
	US-11	Lee Hwy	1.5 miles (2.4 km)	
Junction US-11 & VA-772 (Long Run Road)				The old Looney mill reportedly was at the present-day junction of US-11 and VA-772.
	US-11	Lee Hwy	1.3 miles (2.1 km)	
Beaverdam Creek ford (now a bridge)				At VA-636 (Beaverdam Rd) intersection
	US-11	Lee Hwy	6.7 miles (10.8 km)	Fording Mill Creek twice
Junction US-11 and VA-796 (Gravel Hill Road)				In November 1753, a road was cut to follow the path straight from here (now US-11) to Cloverdale (bypassing Amsterdam). It later became part of the Southwest Turnpike. Before November 1753, however, the Great Wagon Road turned westward here (VA-796) as described below.
	VA-796 + VA-676 + VA-670 + VA-673	Gravel Hill Rd + Parsons Rd + Trinity Rd + Greenfield St	4.8 miles (7.7 km)	Crossing under I-81 highway bridge. A settlement at the junction of VA-670 and VA-673 was known as Howrytown. In 1750, Greenfield Street was called the Market Road.
Amsterdam, Virginia (estab. 1745)				
	VA-720 + US-220	Amsterdam Rd + Roanoke Rd	0.8 miles (1.3 km)	On October 31, 1753, the 15 original Moravian settlers on their way to Wachovia, North Carolina, encountered Joseph McDonald at his house 0.5 miles (0.8 km) before the next fork. This land was owned later by Michael Cloyd, who lived in the same house or built a replacement, which was moved 3 miles (5 km) north in 1995 to Trinity village, where it was painstakingly restored and was a gift shop, but now is empty. Joseph McDonald moved in 1763 to present-day Blacksburg, Virginia, where he built a similar log house which is still preserved today as part of a national historic site.
Fork in the Great Wagon Road; at US-220 & VA-675 (Glebe Rd)				The old road to the New River forked here in the direction of VA-675 (Glebe Rd) to VA-779 (Catawba Rd), VA-311 (Catawba Valley Dr) & VA-785 (Blacksburg Rd), reconnecting eventually with US-11 at Radford, Virginia, near Blacksburg and Christiansburg. In 1758 the trail to Tennessee and Kentucky was improved and widened into a wagon road from the crossing at the New River to the Holston River at Long Island (now Kingsport, Tennessee). After 1761 Ingles Ferry carried the wagons across the New River (at VA-611). In 1797 the Wilderness Trail was improved into a wagon road through the Cumberland Gap to Louisville, Kentucky. The road to North Carolina continued south here, however, following US-220 as described below.
	US-220 + US-11	Roanoke Rd + Lee Hwy	3.8 miles (6.1 km)	Passing over Buffalo Creek and under I-81 Highway.
Fork in the Great Wagon Road; at VA-654 (Read Mountain Rd) & VA-605 (Sanderson Rd); Tinker Creek ford: Cloverdale, Virginia				The road toward Tennessee continued west along US-11 (originally "Carvin's New Road", built in 1753) for 3 miles (5 km), then along VA-117 (Peters Creek Rd) for 5 miles (8 km), then west 2.2 miles (3.5 km) along US-460 (Main Street) to rejoin US-11 westward at Salem, Virginia. The road to North Carolina turned south here, following VA-605 as described below. Also, there is another fork; VA-654 continues over the hill in a shortcut to join US-460, a branch of the old "Warwick Road" to Lynchburg and Richmond, Virginia.
	VA-654 and VA-605	Read Mountain Rd and Sanderson Rd	1.5 miles (2.4 km)	A "stone house" located at the junction of VA-654 and VA-605 was an early landmark for travelers and surveyors.
Roanoke County line (estab. 1838);				
	VA-605	Sanderson Rd + Shadwell Dr (detour) + Old Mountain Rd	3.5 miles (5.6 km)	The original road is now Stonegate Dr and is open only to pedestrians and bikes. The ruins of the Black Horse Tavern (two chimneys) are on Old Mountain Road at its junction with Shadwell Dr.
Tinker Creek ford (now a bridge)				
	VA-115 + US-460	Hollins Rd + Orange Ave	2 miles (3.2 km)	
Fork in the Great Wagon Road; at US-11A (Orange Ave or Salem-Lynchburg Turnpike) and VA-116 (Williamson Rd) intersection				Williamson Rd leads south from here to the Carolinas. Orange Ave (originally "Neely's Road") leads west via Salem Turnpike and Lynchburg Turnpike to Salem, Virginia, where US-11 continues past the New River to Tennessee, or to Kentucky and the Ohio River via the Cumberland Gap and Wilderness Road, which was widened enough for wagons in 1796. (Orange Avenue also leads east to Lynchburg, Virginia, via US-460. This was sometimes called the "Warwick Road" because the road ended south of Richmond at Warwick, Virginia, a seaport that was destroyed in the American Revolutionary War and never rebuilt.)
Old Buffalo Salt Lick				The historic Big Salt Lick is now an industrial area located on both sides of Hollins Road between Rhodes Avenue and Norfolk Avenue. There are numerous salt licks in the area (a large one is on the north side of the Roanoke River at the 9th Street bridge).
		Williamson Rd	0.8 miles (1.3 km)	This is a detour. The original road is now a railroad track.
Roanoke, Virginia (estab. 1834 as "Big Lick")				(At the intersection of Williamson Road and Franklin Road.)

=== Roanoke, Virginia to Wachovia, North Carolina ===
Continue south at Roanoke, Virginia:

Location	Present-day road segment number	Present-day road segment name	Distance covered	Remarks
Roanoke, Virginia (estab. 1834 as "Big Lick")				(At the intersection of Williamson Road and Franklin Road.)
		Franklin Rd	1.4 miles (2.3 km)	
Roanoke River ford (now a bridge)				A roadside historical marker here refers to this as Tosh's ford on the Great Wagon Road. Evans Mill was located nearby, between Crystal Spring and the Roanoke River, probably at the junction of Evans Mill Road and Crystal Spring Avenue. Franklin Rd (US-220 Bus) continues onward, becoming Electric Rd (VA-419), which forks south after 1 mile to Starkey Rd (VA-604) leading to Merriman Rd (VA-613). VA-613 leaves the Great Valley, crossing into Franklin County through Maggoty Gap in the Blue Ridge Mountains; this route provided wagon access to North and South Carolina and Georgia.
	US-220 Business	Franklin Rd	2 miles (3 km)	On November 2, 1753, the original 15 Moravian men on their way to start a settlement at Wachovia (present-day Winston-Salem), North Carolina, were apparently misinformed and mistakenly turned left at Evans mill. With great effort, they forced their way with a large Conestoga type of wagon through the Windy Gap packhorse road over the Blue Ridge Mountains (now VA-116). After their descent into Franklin County on the east side of the ridge and following VA-684, they rejoined the Great Wagon Road at Boones Mill, Virginia.
US-220 freeway intersection				
	VA-419	Electric Rd	1 mile (1.6 km)	
	VA-604	Starkey Rd	2 miles (3 km)	
	VA-613	Merriman Rd	0.5 miles (0.80 km)	
VA-615 (Starlight Lane) intersection				The earliest wagon road apparently turned left here, following VA-615 (Starlight Lane) southeast to Wright, Virginia, then VA-614 (Boones Chapel Road) south to Wild Turkey Road. Continuing to the end of Wild Turkey Road, it would then pass over the Maggoty Gap at Milner Place and descend (through a present-day orchard) across Maggoty Creek to VA-613 (Naff Road), where an existing brick house (at 638 Naff Road) reportedly served as an inn on the Great Wagon Road. A power line now goes through this gap, but it is probably not suitable for driving a vehicle. An alternate path is described below.
	VA-613	Merriman Rd	2 miles (3 km)	This is a detour from the earliest path of the Great Wagon Road. After 1838, this was the path of the Pittsylvania, Franklin, and Botetourt Turnpike.
Simmonds Gap (formerly Maggoty Gap); Franklin County line				
	VA-613	Naff Rd	4.5 miles (7.2 km)	(The detour ends at the VA-852 junction with VA-613.)
US-220 freeway intersection				
	US-220	Goode Hwy	1 mile (1.6 km)	
Boones Mill, Virginia (estab. 1786)				After 1838, the Great Wagon Road moved to the Franklin-Fincastle turnpike, which continued straight here and passed through Rocky Mount, Virginia.
	VA-739	Bethlehem Rd	5 miles (8 km)	Passing over Little Creek culvert. The original Moravian settlers of Wachovia camped here on Bethlehem Road at Little Creek on November 4, 1753.
	VA-643	Bethlehem Rd	2.5 miles (4.0 km)	
	VA-641	Calloway Rd	0.2 miles (0.32 km)	Detour around a cultivated field. (Callaway Post Office is 3.5 miles (5.6 km) west of here.)
	VA-643	Hickman/Hopkins Rd	2.2 miles (3.5 km)	
Blackwater River ford (now a one-lane bridge)				
	VA-643	Coles Creek Rd	2.8 miles (4.5 km)	Passing over Coles Creek culvert.
	VA-821	Calico Rock Rd	1.6 miles (2.6 km)	
Crossing of VA-640 (6 Mile Post Rd)				
	VA-980	Pepper Rd	0.1 miles (0.16 km)	Staying on northeast side of creek.
		Dirt track	0.7 miles (1.1 km)	Around cultivated fields. (May be passable now only on foot or bike.) A detour is located 3 miles (5 km) west of here; south on VA-756 (Old Forge Rd).
Pigg Creek ford				This ford is directly at the north end of VA-802.
	VA-802	Old Carolina Rd	0.8 miles (1.3 km)	(Another path of the "Old Carolina Rd" appears to run along the ridge just 0.3 miles (0.48 km) southeast of this path.)
	VA-756	Old Forge Rd	0.1 miles (0.16 km)	
	VA-864	Old Ferrum Rd	7 miles (11 km)	The original Moravian settlers of Wachovia camped here beside Story Creek one mile northeast of Ferrum on November 5, 1753.
	VA-623	Union Rd + Ingramville Rd	0.5 miles (0.80 km)	Passing over Story Creek culvert.
Ferrum, Virginia (estab. 1889)				Railroad crossing here. The Great Wagon Road south of here was obliterated by railroad construction in 1892.
	VA-767	Prillamin Switch Rd	6 miles (10 km)	Passing over Little Town Creek & Town Creek culverts.
	VA-606	Town Creek Dr	2.5 miles (4.0 km)	Passing over Town Creek Fork bridge. Later travelers could avoid some of the swamps along Town Creek by following ridges west of the valley; VA-771 (Will Hill Rd) and VA-770 (Old Henry Rd).
Henry, Virginia (estab. 1790); Town Creek ford (now a bridge); Henry County line (estab. 1777)				The original Moravian settlers of Wachovia camped here November 6, 1753.
	VA-606	Henry Fork Rd + Original Henry Rd	4 miles (6 km)	Passing over Town Creek and Grassy Fork swampy area, then a steep little hill.
	VA-606	Philpott Dr + Oak Level Rd	4 miles (6 km)	Long gradual ascent, then one mile along the ridge.
	VA-669	Colonial Hill Rd	0.6 miles (0.97 km)	Steep descent, crossing Little Reed Creek at bottom.
	US-220	Virginia Ave	1 mile (1.6 km)	The original Wachovia settlers described this section as "beautiful lowlands" with many grapes, which they enjoyed. They camped on November 7, 1753, at the mouth of Reed Creek on the bank of the Smith River. The landscape as seen by them has since been extensively altered; the Philpott Dam upstream has reduced the river to a relative trickle, and the construction of a railroad and major highway interchange further modified the topography. For these reasons it is difficult to interpret their diary notes. It seems clear, however, that although the next day was extremely strenuous, they traveled through present-day Collinsville, Virginia, and ended up at the mouth of Daniels Creek on the bank of the Smith River, across from present-day Fieldale, after traveling only 7 miles (11 km).
Smith River ford; Fieldale, Virginia (estab. 1917)				The original Wachovia settlers camped on the east bank of the Smith River ford here on November 8, 9, and 10, 1753, waiting for floodwaters to recede. The next day, after fording the river, they took a very difficult route straight ahead through a swamp and up a rough hillside to rejoin the Great Wagon Road.
Fork in the Great Wagon Road at Smith River				Later traffic across this ford appeared to take a right turn onto the Great Wagon Road which looped north briefly around the rough hills. It also appears that wagon traffic in better weather used a ford almost at the mouth of Blackberry Creek (at the end of VA-698) instead of at Fieldale. The 1751 Fry-Jefferson map shows the Blackberry Creek location.
	VA-609	Dillons Fork Rd	2.5 miles (4.0 km)	A man named John Hickey had a peddler's license and ran a store and "ordinary" here at Rangely, Virginia, in 1753. It was the last place to buy salt until beyond Winston-Salem, North Carolina.
	VA-683	The Great Rd + Meadowood Trail	4.5 miles (7.2 km)	In 1753, the original Wachovia settlers continued south along VA-683 (fording over Jordan Creek and Bassett Branch) to Preston Rd. Other travelers reportedly turned west onto VA-627 (Hodges Farm Rd) for 2 miles (3 km) and then south on VA-687 (Preston Rd) to avoid creeks and swamps.
	VA-687	Preston Rd	5.5 miles (8.9 km)	
	US-58	Philpott Hwy	0.3 miles (0.48 km)	
Horse Pasture, Virginia; Crossing of US-58 (Philpott Hwy)				The original Wachovia settlers camped here on November 11, 1753.
	VA-694	Wagon Trail Rd	3.5 miles (5.6 km)	
	VA-692	Horsepasture-Price Rd	0.2 miles (0.32 km)	
	VA-692	Wagon Trail Rd	3.3 miles (5.3 km)	Passing over Horse Pasture Creek ford (now a culvert).
	VA-695	George Taylor Rd	1.4 miles (2.3 km)	
North Mayo River ford (now a bridge)				
	VA-695	George Taylor Rd	3.6 miles (5.8 km)	
South Mayo River ford (now a bridge)				The original Wachovia settlers camped here on November 12, 1753.
	VA-695	George Taylor Rd	1.2 miles (1.9 km)	
Crooked Creek ford (now a bridge)				The ford appears to be slightly east of the road.
	VA-695	George Taylor Rd	0.4 miles (0.64 km)	
North Carolina state line (estab. 1728); Stokes County line (estab. 1789)				
	NC-1625	Amostown Rd	5.2 miles (8.4 km)	Although the early travelers seem to have been very good at estimating mileage in 1750, even on horseback, one should keep in mind that the first odometer in America wasn't invented until 1775 (by Benjamin Franklin, for laying out postal routes) and the first wagon odometers weren't used until a hundred years later (on the Oregon Trail). Until then, the reported method was to tie a rag to a spoke on a wagon wheel and count the number of revolutions; multiplying by the wheel's circumference would yield distance traveled. For a typical day's journey of 15 miles (24 km), one would need to count over 6,000 turns of the rag, which seems error prone and tedious in the extreme. (In comparison, professional surveyors obtained very accurate measurements using a 66-foot-long (20 m) chain; 80 chain lengths measured a mile. A good surveyor would try to keep the chain horizontal even on steep hills and would use a compass sighting along the chain to record the direction of each measurement.)
Sandy Ridge, North Carolina				In 1753, the original Wachovia settlers left the easily traveled ridge more than once to descend to creeks, once at Buffalo Creek, and again apparently on Dillard Road to cross Blackies Branch, presumably because they were following buffalo trails where the animals wanted water.
	NC-704	NC Hwy 704E	5.3 miles (8.5 km)	
	NC-772	NC Hwy 772	2 miles (3 km)	
Dodgetown, North Carolina; fork in the Great Wagon Road				Some wagons branched southwest here to ford the Dan River, possibly following Dodgetown Road past Dillard Road, then down Glidewell Lane to a ford and then over Bumpy Hollow Road and Stewart Road to NC-89 to reach Meadows, Danbury, or Walnut Cove. Wagons also could follow Dodgetown Road and NC-1698 (Davis Chapel Church Road), crossing Davis ford (now a bridge) to reach Meadows, Danbury, or Walnut Cove. It is possible that the original Moravian settlers forded the Dan River here in 1753 and then traveled south to present-day Walnut Cove, but this road doesn't appear on the Wachovia map of 1767. On the Wachovia maps of 1770 and 1771 it runs directly from Salem to the Dan River ford here, crossing Town Creek at present-day Walnut Cove; it is called the Limestone Road in 1770 and the Upper Road in 1771. But Moravian Bishop Spangenburg mentioned in 1752 that the surveyed Wachovia tract was on the "upper road to Pennsylvania". So the original Moravian settlers of Wachovia may well have camped at this Dan River ford on November 13, 14, and 15, in 1753, waiting for the floodwater to recede.
	NC-772	NC Hwy 772	3 miles (5 km)	
Dillard, North Carolina				
	NC-772	NC Hwy 772	4.3 miles (6.9 km)	
		Hickory Fork Rd	1.9 miles (3.1 km)	
		Willard Rd	1.5 miles (2.4 km)	4-wheel drive now recommended from Willard Rd to Walnut Cove. Otherwise continue on Hickory Fork Rd south to US-311, then west to Walnut Cove.
Dan River ford				Impassable during flooding. The road here was called Bryant's Road on the 1771 Wachovia map of "East Part of Surrey County". The original Moravian settlers of Wachovia may have camped here November 13, 14, and 15, in 1753, waiting for the floodwater to recede. The land on the west side of the Dan River has been altered significantly for agriculture, but from the 1766 Moravian map by C. B. Reuter it appears that wagons rolled through in the vicinity of NC-1718 (Saura Farm Road) and made their way up the hill (now Oldtown Road) to the Townfork settlement (now Walnut Cove and Germanton).
	NC-1718	Dirt track + Saura Farm Rd	1 mile (1.6 km)	
	NC-1717	Tuttle Rd	1 mile (1.6 km)	
	US-311	US-311 + Oldtown Rd	2.4 miles (3.9 km)	Culvert with a small creek under US-311.
Walnut Cove, North Carolina (estab. 1883)				After 1770, a road forded Town Creek here and ran directly to Salem, and then to Salisbury, North Carolina. However, the original path of the Great Wagon Road continued as described below.
		Brook Cove Rd	5 miles (8 km)	Fording at Mills, Ash Camp, Voss, Watts, and Martin creeks. This is the area of the historic Townfork Creek Settlement.
	NC-8	NC-8	1 mile (1.6 km)	
Ford at Townfork Creek (now a bridge)				
	NC-8	NC-8	0.6 miles (0.97 km)	The Moravians first encountered a new road here in 1753, presumably cut by existing settlers and leading into the Wachovia Tract toward the Yadkin River.
Germanton, North Carolina (estab. 1790); Forsyth County line (estab. 1849); Buffalo Creek ford (now a bridge)				
	NC-8	NC-8	0.6 miles (0.97 km)	
Junction NC-65				This is the present-day road from Rural Hall.
	NC-8	Germanton Rd	2.3 miles (3.7 km)	
		Stanleyville Dr	5 miles (8 km)	
		University Parkway	0.5 miles (0.80 km)	
	NC-1672	West Haynes Mill Rd	0.8 miles (1 km)	
		Bethania Station Rd	0.5 miles (1 km)	Fording Grassy Creek (now a bridge) at its fork, adjacent to Mill Creek.
Branch from the Great Wagon Road (at the intersection of Bethania Station Rd and Becks Church Rd.)				The Moravians cut a new road on November 17, 1753, from here to Bethabara, North Carolina. It is roughly followed by Bethania Station Rd to its end at Bethabara Rd for a total of 1.6 miles (3 km), including a brief detour on Bethabara Park Blvd. In 1759, the Moravians cut another new road, now NC-1681 (Bethabara Rd), to Bethania from Bethabara. As shown on a 1766 map of Bethania Town Lots by Christian Gottlieb Reuter, it passed just north of the future cemetery in Bethania and is now named Loeschs Lane at its end.
		Becks Church Rd + Murray Rd + Shattalon Rd + Bethabara Rd	2.4 miles (3.9 km)	This is a detour. A 1759 map of Wachovia by Christian Gottlieb Reuter showed the original road fording two streams as it continued almost directly southwest from the intersection of Becks Church Rd and Bethania Station Rd. The next fork was actually at the present-day intersection of NC-1681 (Bethabara Rd) and Towergate Dr.
Fork in the Great Wagon Road. Junction of Bethabara Road (NC-1681) and Towergate Drive				In 1763 a new road was ordered to be cut to Salisbury from this intersection of the Shallow Ford wagon road and Bethabara Road; it followed present-day NC-150 on the east side of the Yadkin River. At about the same time a road was ordered to be cut from Shallow Ford to Salisbury on the west side of the Yadkin River. They were both completed almost simultaneously in 1764, forming alternate paths for the Great Wagon Road. There are two alternative detours from this fork. The Shallow Ford road actually continued west from here in the vicinity of Winona St, Velinda Drive, Flyntdale Avenue and Yadkinville Road; its detour ends on Yadkinville Road at the Muddy Creek bridge. The Trading Ford road actually branched south in the vicinity of Speas Road and Midkiff Road, from where it joined present-day Reynolda Road; its detour ends at the junction of Reynolda Road and Midkiff Road.

=== Wachovia to Salisbury, North Carolina via the Trading Ford ===
Continue south at Wachovia, North Carolina:

Location	Present-day road segment number	Present-day road segment name	Distance covered	Remarks
Fork in the Great Wagon Road. Junction of Bethabara Road (NC-1681) and Towergate Drive				In a 1773 map of Wachovia by Philip Christian Gottlieb Reuter, he identified this Trading Ford branch of the road as the "Salisbury Road Continuing to Charlestown" [South Carolina], presumably through Camden, South Carolina. This road appeared earlier on a 1759 map of Wachovia by Reuter, but it may not yet have been suitable for wagons then.
		Bethabara Rd + Bethabara Park Blvd + Reynolda Rd	2.1 miles (3.4 km)	This is a detour. The Trading Ford road actually branched south in the vicinity of Speas Rd and Midkiff Rd from where it joined present-day Reynolda Rd. The detour ends at the junction of Reynolda Rd and Midkiff Rd.
		Reynolda Rd	0.5 miles (0.80 km)	
Branch from the Great Wagon Road (at the intersection of Reynolda Rd and Old Town Dr)				Old Town Dr was a shortcut from Bethabara to the Salisbury road.
		Reynolda Rd	0.7 miles (1.1 km)	
Intersection of Reynolda Rd and Polo Rd				As indicated on a 1766 Wachovia map by Reuter, a pack horse road crossed here: west via Peace Haven Rd to a ferry and the Bryant Settlement; east to Deep River and the New Garden Quaker Settlement, probably continuing on to Hillsborough and present-day US-15 north through Virginia.
		Reynolda Rd	1.9 miles (3.1 km)	
Junction of Reynolda Rd and Stratford Rd)				The Salisbury Wagon Road reportedly continued south on Stratford Rd, although later a branch appeared at the junction of Salisbury Ridge Road and Acadia Avenue.
		Stratford Rd	1.2 miles (1.9 km)	
Junction of Stratford Rd and 1st St				
		Miller St	1.9 miles (3.1 km)	In 1772, this segment was crossed by a new road from Old Salem to Lewisville (for Shallow Ford) via present-day Academy St. + Hawthorne Rd. + Old Vineyard Rd. + Country Club Dr + Shallowford Rd.
Junction of Miller Street and Silas Creek Parkway				Begin detour here.
		Silas Creek Parkway + Ebert Road + Ardmore Road	2.8 miles (4.5 km)	
Junction of Ardmore Rd and Old Salisbury Rd				End detour here.
		Old Salisbury Rd	3.6 miles (5.8 km)	
Junction of Old Salisbury Rd and NC-150				
	NC-150		4 miles (6.4 km)	
Arcadia, North Carolina—Intersection with Cape Fear Rd				This was an old Indian trading path converted to a pack horse road. It ran east to Cross Creek (now Fayetteville) which was at the navigable head of the Cape Fear River. From there, boats could run cargo to and from Wilmington.
	NC-150		20.5 miles (33.0 km)	On May 31, 1791, George Washington rode here in a carriage from Salisbury to Salem via the ferry at Trading Ford. He was traveling on the Great Wagon Road from Augusta via Camden to Salem, after which he exited toward Guilford Battleground (Greensboro, North Carolina).
Junction of NC-150 and US-29				
	NC-150 & US-29		1.1 miles (1.8 km)	
Yadkin River				Detour over a bridge crossing the Yadkin River near the Trading Ford.
	NC-150 & US-29	Salisbury Ave + Main St	6 miles (9.7 km)	
Salisbury, North Carolina—Junction of Main St (NC-150 & US-29) and Innes St				

=== Wachovia to Salisbury, North Carolina via the Shallow Ford ===
Continue south at Wachovia, North Carolina:

Location	Present-day road segment number	Present-day road segment name	Distance covered	Remarks
Fork in the Great Wagon Road. (Intersection of Bethania Station Rd and Becks Church Rd.)				The Moravians cut a new road on November 17, 1753, from here to Bethabara.
		Becks Church Rd + Murray Rd + Shattalon Rd	1.7 miles (2.7 km)	This is a detour. A 1766 map by Christian Gottlieb Reuter showed the original road continuing almost directly southwest from the intersection of Becks Church Rd and Bethany Station Rd. It forded two streams and passed in the vicinity of present-day Winona St and also Velinda Dr.
Crossing of NC-1681, Bethabara Rd				The Moravians cut a new road, now NC-1681 (Bethabara Rd), to Bethania from Bethabara in 1759. And in 1764 they cut a new branch of the Great Wagon Road to Salisbury from the present-day intersection of Bethabara Rd and Towergate Dr.
		Shattalon Rd	1.0 mile (1.6 km)	Continuing the detour.
Crossing of NC-67, Reynolda Rd				
		Shattalon Rd + Yadkinville Rd	1.8 miles (2.9 km)	Continuing the detour.
Muddy Creek ford (now a bridge)				The original road crossed Muddy Creek here.
		Yadkinville Rd	0.7 miles (1.1 km)	(Continuing a new detour from here.) The original road turned southwesterly immediately west of Muddy Creek, passing at the south end of present-day Pfaff Lane, then crossing Olivet Church Road near its intersection with Spicewood Drive, then continuing to the intersection of Robinhood Road at Glad Acres Road and traveling south along Glad Acres Road. It continued westward just north of Ballyhoo Drive and Windham Farms Lane until it met present-day Lewisville Vienna Road just north of the Shiloh Lutheran Church.
Pfafftown, North Carolina (estab. 1786)				
	NC-1525	Yadkinville Rd	2.5 miles (4.0 km)	
Vienna, North Carolina (estab. 1794)				
	NC-1308	Lewisville-Vienna Rd	3 miles (5 km)	The detour ends at the Shiloh Lutheran Church. The original road continued southward from there.
Lewisville, North Carolina (estab. c.1850); fork of the Great Wagon Road				The Moravians cut a wagon road from Salem to here in 1763 (present-day Academy St. + Hawthorne Rd. + Old Vineyard Rd. + Country Club Dr. + Shallowford Rd). This opened an alternate path for the Great Wagon Road from Germanton through Bethabara and Salem to here. The original junction was at the Old Lewisville Fire Department building on Shallowford Road. The 1776 Mouzon map has no mention of Shallow Ford, but instead shows a road continuing almost due south from Lewisville possibly to a ferry location on the Yadkin River. The Great Wagon Road continued south and west as described below.
	NC-1001	Shallowford Rd	6.6 miles (10.6 km)	
Shallow Ford (Yadkin River); Yadkin County line (estab. 1850)				This is where the Great Wagon Road ended in 1748 when Morgan Bryan finished his trip and settled south of the ford. Several years later he moved north and west, with a farm at the fork of North and South Deep Creek (near US-421). He and his family owned over 5,000 acres (2,000 ha) extending south all the way to Dutchman's Creek. At about the same time, Squire Boone (the father of Daniel Boone) settled (at present-day Mocksville) about 14 miles (23 km) south of Morgan Bryan's mansion. Edward Hughes was probably the first settler at this location. He owned the land on both sides of the road approaching the ford from the east and was already operating a tavern here in 1753, which also served travelers for many years thereafter. (Hughes lived here for over 50 years). Shallow Ford itself is a gravel bar below a natural stone ledge, smooth, wide and flat, and capable of supporting large heavy wagons and automobiles. It is normally under about 18 inches (460 mm) of water, but subject to sudden flooding that may last for days. The Shallow Ford was in regular use until a bridge was built in 1920 about a mile north of the ford. The eastern approach to the ford is now a vineyard. The wagon road on the west side was probably in the vicinity of present-day Canterbury Lane and Cornwallis Drive. The road south of Shallow Ford was ordered in 1763 to be improved from a pack horse trail to a wagon road, which was completed around 1764 to Salisbury, North Carolina. In 1770, another road was ordered cut west to "Mulberry Fields" (now Wilkesboro), which was later extended into Kentucky as the "Daniel Boone Trail" and which turned Shallow Ford into a major north-south and east-west crossroads.
	NC-1001	Courtney-Huntsville Rd	1.2 miles (1.9 km)	
Huntsville, North Carolina (estab. 1793)				
	NC-1716	Farmington Rd	2 miles (3 km)	Over Turner Creek ford (now a bridge).
Davie County line (estab. 1836)				
	NC-1410	Farmington Rd	5 miles (8 km)	
Farmington, North Carolina (estab. c.1756)				Daniel Boone and his wife lived for a time on Sugar Creek 2 miles (3 km) east of here.
	NC-1410	Farmington Rd	4 miles (6 km)	Over Cedar Creek ford (now a bridge).
	US-158	Main St	4.8 miles (7.7 km)	Over Dutchman Creek ford and Elisha Creek ford (now bridges).
Mocksville, North Carolina (estab. c. 1840)				US-64 intersection.
	US-601	Main St	4.6 miles (7.4 km)	
	NC-801	Watt St	2.4 miles (3.9 km)	
Cooleemee, North Carolina (estab. 1814); Rowan County line (estab. 1753); South Yadkin River ford (now a bridge)				The existing plantation was renamed Cooleemee in 1817. It was possible to bypass the plantation community by using Renshaw's ford, located 0.2 miles (0.32 km) west of Powell Rd (about 5 miles (8.0 km) west of Cooleemee).
	NC-801		0.4 miles (0.64 km)	For a detour, continue south on NC-801 to Woodleaf, then east on NC-1948 (Potneck Road) to rejoin the Great Wagon Road.
		Watkins Farm Rd	2 miles (3 km)	Ends now in a dirt track.
Fourth Creek ford or bridge (impassable now)				(Third Creek branch is upstream.)
		Skyview Circle	0.8 miles (1.3 km)	Now a residential development.
	NC-1948	Potneck Rd	1.4 miles (2.3 km)	End of detour.
	US-601		0.1 miles (0.16 km)	
Second Creek ford (now a bridge)				
	US-601		1.2 miles (1.9 km)	
	NC-1910	Old Mocksville Rd	2.5 miles (4.0 km)	
Deals Creek ford (now a bridge)				
	NC-1910	Old Mocksville Rd	4 miles (6 km)	
Grants Creek ford (now a bridge)				
	NC-1910	Mocksville Ave + Ellis St + Innis St	2 miles (3 km)	To US-70 and NC-150 (Main St) intersection.
Salisbury, North Carolina (estab. 1755)				Salisbury became a major east-west and north-south crossroad. (The Great Trading Path came through here.) In 1764, the Moravians cut a road from Bethabara and Salem (traced by NC-150) to the Trading Ford at the Yadkin River and which connected here as an alternate route of the Great Wagon Road. Eventually, by 1775, the Great Wagon Road continued south from here to Charlotte, North Carolina, and Augusta, Georgia.

=== Salisbury, North Carolina to Charlotte, North Carolina ===
Continue south at Salisbury, North Carolina:

Location	Present-day road segment number	Present-day road segment name	Distance covered	Remarks
Salisbury, North Carolina (estab. 1755); Intersection of US-70 and NC-150 (Main St) with Innis Street				This is where the Great Philadelphia Wagon Road ended in 1764.
	US-29	Main St	8.4 miles (13.5 km)	
	US-29A	Main St	1 mile (1.6 km)	
China Grove, North Carolina (estab. 1792)				
	US-29A	Main St	3 miles (5 km)	
Kannapolis, North Carolina (estab. 1906)				Established by J.W. Cannon for his textile mills.
	US-29A	Main St	3 miles (5 km)	
Concord, North Carolina (estab. 1750)				
	US-29	Concord Parkway	3.9 miles (6.3 km)	This is a detour. The original Great Wagon Road continued south from here along Central Drive and crossed the Irish Buffalo River somewhere in the vicinity of Funderburks Lake, then continued on the ridge along NC-1414 (Eva Dr + Rock Hill Church Rd), then Stagecoach Rd, then down a hill and along the present-day Winkler Middle School driveway, after which it is interrupted by NC-1430 (Liles Parkway) before continuing to NC-1432 (Concord Farms Rd) and following it south 0.5 miles (0.80 km) to rejoin US-29 at the end of the detour.
Fork in the Great Wagon Road (to Camden, South Carolina); Intersection with NC-1414 and with Union Cemetery Rd				The original fork actually occurred 1.7 miles (2.7 km) northwest of here on NC-1414 at the junction of Rock Hill Church Road and Stagecoach Road. Stagecoach Road led to Charlotte, while NC-1414 crossing here to Union Cemetery Road led southwest along Webb Road and Zion Church Road (NC-1155 + NC-1153 + NC-1152) to Camden, South Carolina. This path can be followed by creek crossings on the 1776 Mouzon map where his "Hinds Creek" is now named Back Creek and his "Little Creek" is now called Reedy Creek. This route bypassed Charlotte and the Catawba Indian land, and also eliminated the need to cross the Catawba River to reach Camden. At the end of Zion Church Road, the route apparently followed NC-1132 (Flowes Store Road) across the Rocky River ford, then south in Mecklenburg County and Union County via Ferguson Road, Indian Trail Road, and Mill Grove Road, through a golf course and Goose Creek Airport, then on Rocky River Road (NC-1514 + NC-1007) and Lancaster Highway (NC-200) to the South Carolina state line (Lancaster County), then SC-200 (Monroe Highway) to Lancaster, South Carolina, where it joined another branch of the Great Wagon Road to Camden, South Carolina.
	US-29	Concord Parkway	2.6 miles (4.2 km)	This continues the detour until the NC-1432 junction.
	US-29	Concord Parkway	3 miles (4.8 km)	Over Coddle Creek and Mallard Creek fords, now bridges.
Mecklenburg County line (estab. 1762)				At Hudspeth Rd. intersection.
	US-29	Salisbury Rd + Tryon St	12.6 miles (20.3 km)	
Charlotte, North Carolina (estab. 1768)				At Trade Street intersection.

=== Charlotte, North Carolina to Augusta, Georgia via Camden and Columbia, South Carolina ===
Continue south at Charlotte, North Carolina:

Location	Present-day road segment number	Present-day road segment name	Distance covered	Remarks
Charlotte, North Carolina (estab. 1768)				At Trade Street intersection
	US-29	Tryon St	1 mile (1.6 km)	
Fork in the Great Wagon Road (to Camden, South Carolina)				The road on the right led to Augusta, Georgia, via York, South Carolina, and the Broad River ford near Union, South Carolina. The road on the left led to Augusta, Georgia, via Lancaster and Camden, South Carolina, as described below.
		Camden Rd + Tremont St + South Blvd	2 miles (3 km)	Slight detour around rail tracks
	NC-1308	Old Pineville Rd	3.8 miles (6.1 km)	Slight detour around rail tracks
		South Blvd	0.2 miles (0.32 km)	Slight detour around rail tracks
	NC-1308 + NC-1138	Old Pineville Rd + Arrowood Rd	3.7 miles (6.0 km)	Slight detour around rail tracks
		South Blvd + Pineville Rd + Polk St + Lancaster Hwy	4.8 miles (7.7 km)	
		Dorman Rd	1 mile (1.6 km)	
South Carolina state line; Lancaster County line (estab. 1798)				Former boundary of Catawba Indian Nation
		Dorman Rd + Harrisburg Rd	3.4 miles (5.5 km)	
Clems Branch of Twelvemile Creek ford (now a bridge)				Great Wagon Road historical marker here at roadside
	US-521	Harrisburg Rd + Charlotte Hwy	9 miles (14 km)	
Twelvemile Creek ford (now a bridge)				
	US-521	Charlotte Hwy + Main St	13 miles (21 km)	Fording Causar Branch, Waxhaw Creek, Cane Creek and Camp Creek (now culverts).
Fork in the Great Wagon Rd; Gills Creek ford (now a bridge); Lancaster, South Carolina (estab. 1795)				A branch of the Great Wagon Road from Concord, North Carolina (SC-200, Monroe Hwy), merged here with the branch (US-521) from Charlotte to Camden. Waxhaw Presbyterian Church was built here in 1759, indicating the presence of an early Scotch-Irish settlement. Town possibly named by settlers from Lancaster, Pennsylvania.
	US-521 + US-521Bus	Main St + Kershaw Camden Hwy	18 miles (29 km)	Fording Bear Creek (now a bridge).
Kershaw, South Carolina (estab. 1732)				
	US-521 Bus + US-521	Hampton St + Kershaw Camden Hwy	3.5 miles (5.6 km)	Fording Hanging Rock Creek (now a culvert).
Kershaw County line (estab. 1791) at US-521 and SC-29-769 intersection				
	US-521	Main St + Kershaw Camden Hwy + Broad St	18 miles (29 km)	Fording Grannies Quarter Creek, Gum Swamp Creek and Sanders Creek (now culverts).
Camden, South Carolina (estab. 1732)				
	US-1	Main St	2.7 miles (4.3 km)	Fording Bolton Branch and Camp Creek (now culverts).
Wateree (Catawba) River ferry				
	US-1 + SC-12	Two Notch Rd (Fall Line Rd) + Taylor St	30 miles (48 km)	Fording Buck Creek and Little Jackson Creek (now culverts).
Columbia, South Carolina (estab. 1786); Congaree River ford (now a bridge); Lexington County line (estab. 1785)				
	SC-12 + US-1	Jarvis Klapman Blvd + Augusta Rd	3.5 miles (5.6 km)	
Fork in the Great Wagon Road; intersection of I-26 and US-1				I-26 leads north to the nearby Saluda River ford and the Broad River ford near Union, South Carolina, which carried wagon traffic from Charlotte, North Carolina.
	US-1	Augusta Rd + Main St	8.4 miles (13.5 km)	
Lexington, South Carolina (estab. 1735)				Originally named "Saxe-Gotha".
	US-1 + SC-23	Main St + Augusta Rd + Leesville Ave + Church St	16.6 miles (26.7 km)	Fording Horse Creek, Little Creek and Clouds Creek (now culverts).
Leesville, South Carolina (estab. 1875); at Lee St intersection				
	SC-23	Church St	3 miles (5 km)	
Saluda County line (estab. 1895)				
	SC-23	Church St + Calhoun St	16 miles (26 km)	
Fork in the Great Wagon Road; Johnston, South Carolina (estab. c.1750); Edgefield County line (estab. 1785)				The Great Wagon Road branches from Columbia ford and Camden joined the branch from Pelzer here at Johnston. Later, in 1795, Francis Higgins installed a ferry across the Saluda River between Newberry and Saluda (serving SC-121); this shortened the Great Wagon Road to Augusta significantly.
	SC-121	Edgefield Rd	20 miles (32 km)	
Aiken County line (estab. 1871)				At Sweetwater Rd intersection
	SC-121	Edgefield Rd	8 miles (13 km)	
Savannah River Ferry; Georgia state line; Richmond County line (estab. 1777); Augusta, Georgia (estab. 1735)				The river was navigable from here to Savannah, Georgia.
End of the Great Wagon Road

=== Charlotte, North Carolina to Augusta, Georgia via Union and Columbia, South Carolina ===
Continue south at Charlotte, North Carolina:

Location	Present-day road segment number	Present-day road segment name	Distance covered	Remarks
Charlotte, North Carolina (estab. 1768)				At Trade Street intersection
	NC-49	Tryon St	1 mile (1.6 km)	
Fork in the Great Wagon Road (to Camden, South Carolina)				The road on the left led to Augusta, Georgia, via Lancaster and Camden, South Carolina. (George Washington arrived in Charlotte from this fork in 1791.) The road on the right led to Augusta, Georgia, via Union and Columbia, South Carolina as described below.
	NC-49	Tryon St	14.8 miles (23.8 km)	
Catawba River (now Lake Wylie), South Carolina state line; York County line (estab. 1772)				Originally a ferry; now bridged.
	SC-49	Charlotte Hwy + Congress St	16.4 miles (26.4 km)	
York, South Carolina (estab. 1786); at Liberty Street intersection.				Originally called Fergus Crossroads (colonial roads led in six directions from here). Possibly renamed by settlers from York, Pennsylvania. Some wagon traffic arrived here (on present-day SC-161) from Charlotte via the Nations Ford at the Catawba River. One crossroad ran from Kings Mountain in North Carolina to Camden and Charleston, South Carolina.
	SC-49	Congress St + Sharon Rd + Lockhart Hwy	17.5 miles (28.2 km)	
Chester County line (estab. 1776)				At Mt Hopewell church.
	SC-49	Lockhart Hwy	3.5 miles (5.6 km)	
Broad River Ford (now a bridge); Lockhart, SC; Union County line (estab. 1785)				
	SC-49	Lockhart Hwy + Main St	9.6 miles (15.4 km)	
Union, South Carolina (estab. 1765)				Originally Unionville. Named after Union church, built 1765.
Fork in the Great Wagon Road				It is possible to reach Augusta by continuing west on SC-49, but it is a considerably longer alternate route. Instead, turn left onto SC-215 to reach Augusta via the Saluda River ford at Columbia, then through Leesville and Johnston, South Carolina as described below.
	SC-215	Monarch Hwy + Santuc Carlisle Hwy	12 miles (19 km)	
	US-72	Carlisle-Whitmire Hwy	5.6 miles (9.0 km)	
	SC-36-54	Tuckertown Rd	6.2 miles (10.0 km)	It is possible to trace the path from this location by following the creek crossings on the 1776 Mouzon map. (After 1795, Higgins ferry across the Saluda River was reported to provide a much shorter route via SC-121 through Newberry and Saluda, South Carolina.)
Tyger River ford (now a bridge); Newberry County line (estab. 1785)				
	SC-36-54 + SC-36-45	Tuckertown Rd + Maybinton Rd	5.2 miles (8.4 km)	
Enoree River ford (now a bridge over a lake)				
	SC-36-45 + SC-36-55 + SC-36-28	Maybinton Rd + Mt Pleasant Rd + Broad River Rd	11 miles (18 km)	
Second Creek ford (now a bridge)				
		Broad River Rd	2.7 miles (4.3 km)	
Cannons Creek ford (now a bridge over a lake)				
		Broad River Rd	3.6 miles (5.8 km)	
Crims Creek ford (now a bridge); Richland County line (estab. 1785)				
	SC-40-32 + US-176	Stoudemayer Rd + Broad River Rd	4.8 miles (7.7 km)	
Wateree Creek ford (now a bridge)				
	US-176	Broad River Rd	4.2 miles (6.8 km)	
Hollinshead Creek ford (now a bridge)				
	US-176 + US-76 + I-26	Broad River Rd + I-26	16 miles (26 km)	
Saluda River ford (now an Interstate Hwy bridge); Lexington County line (estab. 1785)				
	I-26	Interstate Hwy 26	3 miles (5 km)	
Fork in the Great Wagon Road; West Columbia, South Carolina (estab. 1894); junction with "Fall Line Rd" (US-1) from Camden, South Carolina				The Fall Line Rd was also called the "Occaneechi Path".
	US-1	Augusta Rd + Main St	8.4 miles (13.5 km)	
Lexington, South Carolina (estab. 1735)				Originally named "Saxe-Gotha"
	US-1 + SC-23	Main St + Augusta Rd + Leesville Ave + Church St	16.6 miles (26.7 km)	Fording Horse Creek, Little Creek and Clouds Creek (now culverts).
Leesville, South Carolina (estab. 1875); at Lee St intersection.				
	SC-23	Church St	3 miles (5 km)	
Saluda County line (estab. 1895)				
	SC-23	Church St + Calhoun St	16 miles (26 km)	
Fork in the Great Wagon Road; Johnston, South Carolina (estab. c.1750); Edgefield County line (estab. 1785)				The Great Wagon Road branches from Columbia ford and Camden joined the branch from Union and Pelzer here at Johnston. Later, in 1795, Francis Higgins installed a ferry across the Saluda River between Newberry and Saluda (serving SC-121); this shortened the Great Wagon Road to Augusta significantly.
	SC-121	Edgefield Rd	20 miles (32 km)	
Aiken County line (estab. 1871)				At Sweetwater Rd intersection
	SC-121	Edgefield Rd	8 miles (13 km)	
Savannah River Ferry; Georgia state line; Richmond County line (estab. 1777); Augusta, Georgia (estab. 1735)				The river was navigable from here to Savannah, Georgia.
End of the Great Wagon Road

=== Alternate path from Union, South Carolina to Augusta, Georgia, via Pelzer, South Carolina ===
Continue west from Union, South Carolina after the Broad River crossing:

Location	Present-day road segment number	Present-day road segment name	Distance covered	Remarks
Fork in the Great Wagon Road				The principal wagon road to Augusta branched south here, passing through Carlisle and Columbia. But after 1761 a peace treaty with the Cherokees allowed safe travel west of here, and many travelers settled in the area. This region became the end of the road for most migrants from Pennsylvania, but the old existing Cherokee trails were eventually widened and provided a market path to Augusta. So it is possible to continue on SC-49 toward the junction of the historic Charleston to Keowee road near Pelzer, South Carolina, then south through "Ninety Six" Village and Johnston, South Carolina, to Augusta, as described below. Total distance from Charlotte to Augusta via this route is approximately 250 miles (400 km).
Union, South Carolina (estab. 1765)				Originally Unionville. Named after Union church, built 1765.
	SC-49	Main St. + Cross Keys Hwy	6 miles (9.7 km)	
Fair Forest River Shoal				Ford is now a bridge.
	SC-49	Cross Keys Hwy	3.8 miles (6.1 km)	
Tyger River Ford				Ford is now a bridge.
	SC-49	Cross Keys Hwy	10.5 miles (16.9 km)	
Spartanburg County line (estab. 1785)				
	SC-92	Parker Rd	6.4 miles (10.3 km)	Ford at Two Mile Creek is now a bridge.
Enoree River Ford; Laurens County line (estab. 1785)				Ford is now a bridge. (River Hill Rd appears to follow the original path.)
	US-221 + SC-92 + SC-30-399 + SC-101 + SC-30-311 + SC-418	Highway 92 + Bramlett Church Rd + Durbin Church Rd + Durbin Rd + Gulliver St	16.6 miles (26.7 km)	Fords at Beaverdam Creek, nameless creek, and South Durbin Creek, now bridged.
Greenville County line (estab. 1786); Fountain Inn, South Carolina (estab. 1832)				The intersection of the wagon road with the Laurens-Greenville Road (SC-14, Main Street) and also with the county line appears on the 1814 map by Samuel Lewis.
	SC-418	McCarter Rd + Milacron Dr + Green Pond Rd + Tall Pines Rd + Fairview Rd + McKelvey Rd	8.3 miles (13.4 km)	Fords at Payne Branch and South Rabon Creek, now bridged.
Reedy River; Fork Shoals				Ford is now bypassed by twin bridges.
	SC-418 + SC-8	McKelvey Rd + Hopkins Rd + Old Hundred Rd (SC-418) + Lebby St (SC-8)	9.8 miles (15.8 km)	
Saluda River Ford; Anderson County line (estab. 1826); Pelzer, South Carolina (estab. 1882)				Ford is now a bridge.
	SC-8	Lebby St + Easley Hwy + Campbell Rd + White Oak Rd	10.8 miles (17.4 km)	
Historic junction with the Old Charleston-Keowee Rd, now Mountain View Rd (SC-4-567)				This junction is shown on the 1776 Mouzon map. The original "28 Miles Branch" (of Barker Creek) is now called "Six And Twenty Creek". The original "26 Miles Branch" is now called "West Six And Twenty Creek". The road north from this junction went to the old Cherokee town of Keowee, now at the bottom of Lake Keowee, near the mouth of Mile Creek (11 miles north of Clemson). To get there, the most likely path matching the mapped creek crossings is Mountain View Rd, Old Greenville Hwy, Hamlin Rd, Flat Rock Rd, Five Forks Rd, Peachtree St, Liberty Hwy, Mt. Olivet Rd, and Old Keowee Church Rd. However, the road to Augusta ran southward as described below.
	SC-4-567 + SC-81	Mountain View Rd + Highway 81	3.8 miles (6.1 km)	
Bridge over I-85 at Exit 57				
	SC-217 + US-29 + SC-211 + SC-63	Alliance Parkway + Hampton Rd + Pine Trail Rd + US-29 + Cheddar Rd (SC-211) + Hammond Rd + Mize Rd + Dorchester Rd (SC-63) + Breazeale St	11 miles (18 km)	Fords now bridged at Beaverdam Creek, Little Beaverdam Creek, Watermelon Creek, Rock Creek, Browns Creek, and Cupboard Creek.
Belton, South Carolina (estab. 1855)				
	US-178	Main St	8.5 miles (13.7 km)	
Honea Path, South Carolina (estab. 1855); Abbeville County line (estab. 1785)				County line is at Tribble St intersection. The town was also sometimes known as Honey Path.
	US-178	Church St + Main St	7 miles (11 km)	
Greenwood County line (estab. 1897)				County line is at Mock Orange Rd intersection. Shoals Junction is nearby.
	US-178	Old Shoals Junction Rd + Montague Ave + Hampton Ave + Main St	16 miles (26 km)	
Greenwood, South Carolina (estab. 1857)				Main St at Court Ave intersection.
	SC-34	Main St + Lebanon Church Rd + Louden Rd + Cambridge St	9.2 miles (14.8 km)	Marion Creek ford, now bridged
Ninety Six National Historic Site				This was the original location of the colonial town. The new town is 2 miles (3 km) north of here.
	SC-248	Cambridge St	2 miles (3.2 km)	
Ninety Six, South Carolina (estab. 1730)				This is probably a detour. The original path of the road is presently unknown for this area. (The town was named before 1730, probably from an inaccurate estimate of the distance in miles to the old Cherokee town of Keowee.) There was reportedly a colonial era ferry across the Saluda River at Island Ford just north of here, at present-day Lake Greenwood State Park. Chappell's ferry was established downstream in 1755 at present-day Chappells Highway (SC-39). Higgins ferry was established in 1795 at present-day Newberry Highway (SC-121).
	SC-34 + SC-246 + US-178	Main St + Highway 246 + Greenwood Hwy	12 miles (19 km)	
Saluda County line (estab. 1895)				The line is at the US-178 and SC-246 intersection. The original Cherokee path branched off somewhere in this vicinity, then continued through Saluda and all the way to Charleston.
	US-178 + SC-41-155 + SC-121	Greenwood Hwy + Hwy 41-155 + Fruit Hill Rd + Hwy 121 + Lee St	18 miles (29 km)	
Fork in the Great Wagon Road; Johnston, South Carolina (estab. c.1750); Edgefield County line (estab. 1785)				The Great Wagon Road branch from Columbia ford joined the branch from Union and Pelzer here at Johnston. Later, in 1795, Francis Higgins installed a ferry across the Saluda River between Newberry and Saluda (serving SC-121); this shortened the Great Wagon Road to Augusta significantly.
	SC-121	Edgefield Rd	20 miles (32 km)	
Aiken County line (estab. 1871)				At Sweetwater Rd intersection
	SC-121	Edgefield Rd	8 miles (13 km)	
Savannah River Ferry; Georgia state line; Richmond County line (estab. 1777); Augusta, Georgia (estab. 1735)				The river was navigable from here to Savannah, Georgia.
End of the Great Wagon Road
