= Carolina Road =

Various routes through colonial America

The Carolina Road or the "Old Carolina Road" are names for various sections of the Great Wagon Road and other routes in colonial America. "The 'Old Carolina Road', extending from Lancaster, Pennsylvania to the Yadkin Valley, was one of the most heavily traveled roads in eighteenth century America." Parts of the 180-mile-long (290 km) Journey Through Hallowed Ground National Heritage Area scenic byway follow the Old Carolina Road through Pennsylvania, Maryland and Virginia.

== Maryland section ==
An article written during the Bicentennial discusses the colonial routes passing through and around Frederick, Maryland. The Dennis Griffith map of 1794 clearly shows the Monocacy Road crossing the river at Ceresville, Maryland. Thus this important route, described at first as a "plain path" between the villages of the Susquehannock Indians in Pennsylvania and Oceaneechee Island in the south, became a road passing through Fredericktown. It was a link in the old Carolina Road. The main Monocacy Road was recorded as passing near the Quaker Meeting House at Buckeystown, Maryland (near Md. Route 85).

== Central Virginia (High Road) alternative path ==
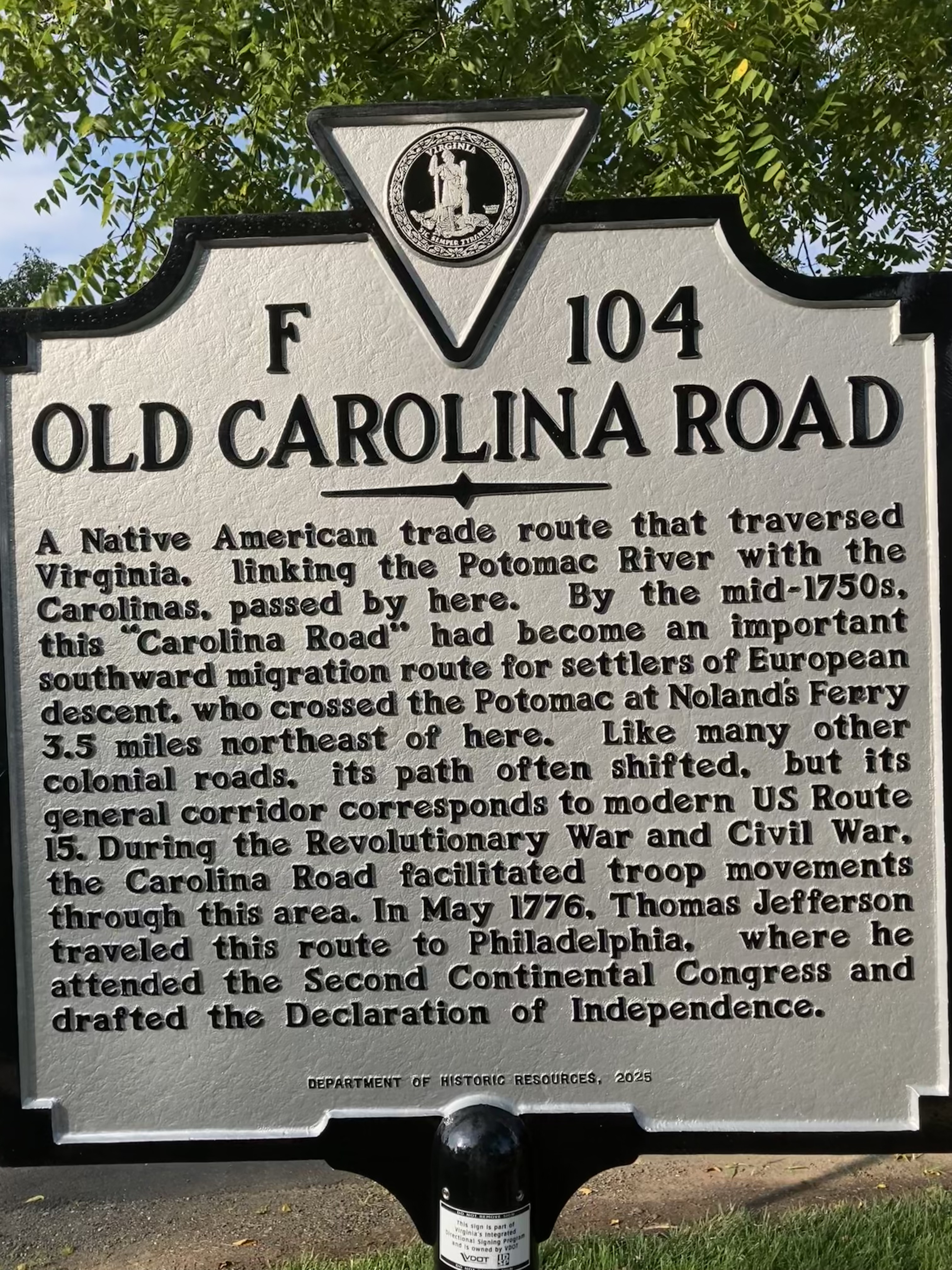
Old Carolina Road historical marker near Route 15 in Loudoun County, Virginia

Starting in Pennsylvania, this "Carolina Road" led through southern Pennsylvania, Maryland, Virginia, the Carolinas, Georgia and into Alabama. This was a major migration route of Swiss-German and Scotch-Irish settlers into frontier America in the 1740s until the American Revolutionary War.

Some consensus indicates this Carolina road started in Frederick, Maryland, with feeder roads and other trails reaching from Pennsylvania. Parts of this Carolina Road, almost 55 miles, follow modern U.S. Route 15 through Loudoun, Fauquier and Prince William Counties in Virginia. Noland's Ferry was a link in the Carolina Road.

Used as a transportation route, in addition to early settlers, manufactured goods including woolen and linen clothes and leather products, such as harness, saddles, boots and shoes, were sent south, and hides, indigo and money were sent back north. Many drovers herded swine, cattle, sheep and even turkey flocks along the Carolina Road. Because many of these drovers would pick up cows and other livestock to add to their herds in northern Virginia, this was also called the "Rogues' Road" by local farmers. "Indeed, as early as 1747, a Fauquier land grant refers to the Carolina Road as "Rogues Road," a name that appears in Fauquier and Loudoun deeds throughout the early 1900s. A few miles north of Leesburg, on old Montresor farm, a narrow wooded stream valley still bears the name Rogues' Hollow, for tradition states that this geographic depression was the lair for thieves about to plunder travelers."

During the Civil War, Fort Beauregard (Virginia) was established by the Confederate forces in Leesburg, Virginia, to protect the Carolina Road and Alexandria and Winchester Turnpike (present day Virginia State Route 7) approaches to the town.

A portion of Carolina Road from the mid-1800s is illustrated in map form as part of Loudoun County, Virginia history. Going south on the Old Carolina Road from Evergreen Mills Road at Goose Creek, one must turn right on Watson Road and follow it south to Highway 50 (the old Little River Turnpike, at Mount Zion Old School Baptist Church. The Old Carolina Road bed continues for a little just west of the church (foot traffic only).

== Western Virginia (Shenandoah) alternative path ==
Part of this "Carolina Road" follows the roadbed of U.S. Route 11, also known as the "Lee Highway", through Virginia. Near Cloverdale, Virginia is the historical marker: ""This is the old road from Pennsylvania to the Yadkin Valley, over which in early times settlers passed going south. On it were the Black Horse Tavern and the Tinker Creek Presbyterian Church." The Black Horse Tavern on the marker refers to the nearby Black Horse Tavern-Bellvue Hotel and Office.

Part of the Great Wagon Road branched off near what is present day Roanoke, Virginia, and U.S. Route 220 in Virginia now follows along part of this section of the Carolina Road. In the early 1740s, white settlers followed an Indian Trading Path, sometimes referred to as the "Shenandoah Hunting Path" which led from Winchester Virginia to Salem, Virginia, and would later be known as the "Valley Pike" and even later, US Route 11. The colonial road was laid from Harrisburg toward the Potomac River, and extending southwards was settlements progressed in that direction. "During the interim, the North-South route was referred to by various other names such as "Indian Road", "Borden's Path", "Carolina Road", "Great Road", "The Great Philadelphia Wagon Road" and the "Road from Philadelphia to Yadkin."

"The route was improved as a stage road in the early years of the republic. In 1838 it was rebuilt to serve the Pittsylvania, Franklin and Botetourt Turnpike, which served to connect south central Virginia with the Valley."

An historical marker, dated from 1987, is located nearby. "Here through the Maggoty Gap, the Great Wagon Road from Philadelphia to Georgia, known locally as the Carolina Road, passes through the Blue Ridge. Originating as the Great Warrior Path (Great Indian Warpath) of the Iroquois centuries before, the path was frequently used by the Iroquois before being ceded to the whites in 1744 to become one of the most heavily traveled roads in all Colonial America."

A portion of the roadbed can be seen at Maggoty Gap, where it crossed the Blue Ridge at Maggodee Gap. Today this is part of the Cahas Mountain Rural Historic District in Boones Mill, Virginia. The volume of travel along this part of the Carolina road was so great that it encouraged the construction of two brick homes from the 1820s, the John and Susan Boon House and the Taylor-Price house. The Boon house offered accommodations for travelers, and probably the Taylor Price House was used as an inn also.

A quarter-mile section of the Carolina Road can be seen at Waid Park in Franklin County, Virginia.

Another branch turned south from Big Lick, near present-day Roanoke, and turned south toward the Catawba country in South Carolina. Later this trading path would be called part of the Great Wagon Road or the Carolina Road. William Byrd II would mention it during his survey of the dividing line between North Carolina and Virginia during November 1728. "The Trading Path above mentioned receives its name from being the Route the Traders take with their caravans, when they go to traffick with the Catawbas and other Southern Indians... The Course from Roanoke to the Catawbas is laid down nearest Southwest, and lies through a fine country, that is watered by Several beautiful Rivers."

The early settlement of Martinsville, Virginia, coincides with the route of the Carolina Road through Henry County, Virginia. The Carolina Road follows along or parallels present day U.S. Route 220 through the county. By the 1760s, sometimes 1,000 wagons a day would pass through Martinsville. "Initial settlement of the area around Martinsville coincides with the road. Settlers represented diverse cultural backgrounds: Germans, Welsh, Scots-Irish, English and African."

== North Carolina section ==
The Carolina Road extended into North Carolina as a major trade route and access for early settlers. However, once again it became known by different names, both locally and regionally. "In our state it is known as the Great Philadelphia Wagon Road, the Great Wagon Road, or simply the Wagon Road. In Virginia, it is called the Carolina Road, because it led to Carolina."

An early settlement by Morgan Bryan, a Pennsylvania Quaker, took six weeks to travel from Pennsylvania to North Carolina. The road was so bad that at times his wagon had to be taken apart and carried away in sections over some of the mountains. "The trail called "The Great Wagon Road" or "The Old Carolina Road" passed thru the Bryan Settlement, about one mile south of the junction of the Deep Creek and the Yadkin River, at a place called the Shallow Ford.

== South Carolina sections ==
In York County, South Carolina, the Carolina Road seems to have split, one branch going westward to Chester and south to Columbia, South Carolina along U.S. Route 321, the other branch of the road staying nearer the river to Columbia (U.S. 21). The road ended at the Savannah River across from Augusta, Georgia.

== Bibliography ==
- Hofstra, Warren R. Domestic Architecture and the Early Shenandoah Valley. [Place of publication not identified]: [publisher not identified], 1992. Presented at the February 21, 1992, meeting of the Shenandoah Valley Regional Studies Seminar. Abstract: Describes the importance of roads and their effect on the architecture of farms and homes throughout the Shenandoah Valley in the 18th and 19th centuries. Discusses how improved roads allowed rural Virginians to transport their produce to centralized markets, such as Winchester, Virginia. Improved markets caused a transition from a barter-based system to a capitalist market economy. Describes how that transition affected architecture, land use, and community life in the Shenandoah Valley; particularly in the Winchester and Frederick County regions.
- Hyland, Thomas R. The Carolina Road: From a Primitive Mid-17th Century Indian Trading Path to a Primary Pioneer Settlement and Inter-Colony Trading Route. Leesburg, VA: the author, 2009.
- Kegley, Mary B. Finding Their Way from the Great Road to the Wilderness Road, 1745-1796. Wytheville, VA: Kegley Books, 2008. * Pawlett, Nathaniel Mason. A Brief History of the Roads of Virginia, 1607–1840. Charlottesville: Virginia Highway & Transportation Research Council, 1977. Abstract: This volume consists of what was originally intended as the introductory chapters of the Albemarle road history. Since most readers are probably unfamiliar with the history of roads in Virginia, it was thought proper to devote the first section of that work to a sketch of the development of road transportation here up to the coming of the period of intense railroad development in the nineteenth century. At the suggestion of several of the people who read the first draft, and in-the interest of increasing the utility of this particular section, a separate publication was decided upon. The author hopes that this brief sketch will help to place development of the roads of Albemarle, as well as those of the other counties, within the larger context of the development of Virginia's roads, and that it will simultaneously provide some understanding of the varied and often conflicting forces which shaped transportation policy at the colonial and state levels.
- Scheel, Eugene (2014). "The Carolina Road". History of Loudoun County, Virginia. Thomas Balch Library, Leesburg, Virginia.
- Scheel, Eugene M. Loudoun Discovered: Leesburg & the Old Carolina Road. Vol. 2 Vol. 2. Leesburg, Va: Friends of the Thomas Balch Library, 2002.
- Scheel, Eugene M., and B. P. Harrison. The Carolina Road Corridor of Loudoun County: Once the Main North-to-South Trail, and Cradle of Farming in America. Waterford, Va: Eugene M. Scheel, 1997.
- R. Kyle Stimson, The Great Philadelphia Wagon Road in Forsyth County, North Carolina, 1750–1770 (1999)
- Rummel, Earl C. (2014). "The Carolina Road & The Old Carolina Road". Brethren Life: Brethren Migrations. Church of The Brethren Network.
- FCHS (2013). "Franklin County History". Franklin County Historical Society – Kittochtinny, Chambersburg, Pennsylvania ©2013. Archived from the original on December 17, 2014.
- Virginia, and Virginia Transportation Research Council. A History of Roads in Virginia: "the Most Convenient Wayes". [Richmond, Va.]: The Department, 1989.
