= Journey Through Hallowed Ground National Heritage Area =

United States National Heritage Area

Coordinates: 39°11′17.3″N 77°36′42.7″W

The Journey Through Hallowed Ground National Heritage Area is a federally designated National Heritage Area in portions of Pennsylvania, West Virginia, Maryland and Virginia.

== History and background ==
The Journey Through Hallowed Ground National Heritage Area was established on May 8, 2008 by Public Law 110-229, the Consolidated Natural Resources Act of 2008. The designation provides a framework for the promotion and interpretation of the area's cultural and historic character, with particular emphasis on the region's role in the American Civil War, and the preservation of the natural and built environment.

The National Heritage Area extends from Gettysburg in the north to Monticello in the south. It is managed by the Journey Through Hallowed Ground Partnership, which encompasses the Journey Through Hallowed Ground National Scenic Byway. The heritage area roughly follows the route of the Old Carolina Road.

The Journey Through Hallowed Ground Partnership is a non-profit organization dedicated to raising the awareness of the history within the Gettysburg-Monticello corridor. Its mission is to promote and support civic engagement through history education, economic development through heritage tourism, and the preservation of cultural landscapes in one of the nation’s most important historic regions. Partners include over 350 municipal, business, and non-profit organizations, including many elected bodies within the four-state region. All related entities are collectively referred to as the Journey Through Hallowed Ground.

The Journey Through Hallowed Ground National Heritage Area denotes the region that Congress designated as such in a program affiliated with the National Park Service. There are fifteen counties in this heritage area, spanning four states. With four hundred years of European, American, and African-American heritage, the Journey Through Hallowed Ground is a National Heritage Area with a National Scenic Byway running through it. It contains World Heritage sites, over 10,000 sites on the National Register of Historic Places, 49 national historic districts, nine presidential homes and sites, thirteen National Park units, hundreds of African-American and Native American heritage sites, thirty historic main street communities, sites from the Revolutionary War, French-Indian War, War of 1812, and the largest single collection of Civil War sites in the nation.

The Journey Through Hallowed Ground National Heritage Area comprises Adams County in Pennsylvania, Frederick and Carroll counties and the eastern part of Washington county in Maryland, the area around Harpers Ferry in Jefferson County, West Virginia, and Loudoun, Fauquier, Culpeper, Orange, Albemarle, Greene, Madison and Rappahannock counties and parts of Fairfax, Prince William and Spotsylvania counties in Virginia.

== National Scenic Byway ==
The Journey Through Hallowed Ground National Scenic Byway refers to the 180-mile (290 km) road that intersects the Journey Through Hallowed Ground National Heritage Area. Once known as Old Carolina Road, the Journey Through Hallowed Ground National Scenic Byway runs 180 miles (290 km) through three states and includes portions of US Rt. 15, VA 231, VA 20, and VA 53, running through Virginia, Maryland, and Pennsylvania. The JTHG National Scenic Byway is one of 150 scenic byways nationwide designated by the U.S. secretary of transportation.

== National History Academy ==
In the summer of 2018, the Journey Through Hallowed Ground launched National History Academy, an innovative five-week residential summer program for top high school students from throughout the country. The academy teaches the foundations of American democracy through place-based education.

National History Academy’s mission is to inspire students to understand the foundations of American democracy and the responsibilities of citizenship. The first of its kind, the Academy was founded to address the current crisis in American civic and historical literacy.

During the five-week course, students study American history, from the Native American settlement era through the civil-rights movement, with an emphasis on significant events and figures between 1765 and 1865. The group alternates between classroom studies and visits to historic sites within and near the Journey Through Hallowed Ground National Heritage Area.

National History Academy’s motto, “Historia Est Magistra Vitae,” is taken from Cicero’s De Oratore and means “history is the teacher of life.”

=== Admissions and student life ===
The Academy has capacity for ninety rising 10th, 11th, and 12th grade students each summer. In 2018, 233 students applied, and 89 students from 28 states enrolled. Courses are taught by six master teachers. Students are also overseen by twelve college counselors.

National History Academy is hosted at the Foxcroft School in Middleburg, Virginia, a private secondary school. The campus is located 45 miles from Washington, D.C. and within a three-hour drive of all the historic sites that the students visit. Filmmaker Ken Burns is featured in the Academy’s promotional video.

=== Curriculum ===
The curriculum is built around four components: (1) history cases; (2) parliamentary debates; (3) a speaker series; and (4) visits to the defining sites of American history.

==== History cases ====
The Academy uses the case-based History of American Democracy curriculum developed by Harvard Business School Professor David A. Moss. The cases provide an interdisciplinary and contextual examination of key historic events, permitting students to consider multiple viewpoints and to place themselves in the role of decision makers. In 2018, Professor Moss taught the first case on the United States Constitution at James Madison’s Montpelier.

==== Braver Angels debates ====
The Academy offers a parliamentary debate program in partnership with the Braver Angels and its founder, David Blankenhorn. The College Board provided the initial funding for this partnership. The debates are designed to encourage civil discourse across the partisan divide in an open and respectful environment. This formal style of parliamentary debate allows students to explore challenging contemporary issues in contrast to the historical debates studied in the cases.

==== Guest speakers ====
The Academy invites more than twenty nationally recognized guest speakers to supplement classroom activities. Among the 2018 guest speakers were David Rubenstein, Ernest Green, Margaret Richardson, Brent Glass, Jon Parrish Peede, Trevor Potter, Douglas Owsley, Ron Maxwell and Robert Duvall.

==== Site visits and unique experiences ====
The Academy alternates classroom work with visits to the defining historic sites in the region, from Gettysburg to Harpers Ferry, Washington, D.C., Charlottesville and Colonial Williamsburg. Students experience iconic National Parks, museums, presidential homes, battlefields, and Civil Rights sites.
