= Maggoty Gap =

- Location within Virginia
- Elevation: 1,125 feet (343 m)
- Traversed by: State Road 677 – Willow Branch Road

Third Approach
- Location: Roanoke county, Virginia, United States
- Range: Blue Ridge Mountains
- Coordinates: 37°09′22″N 79°58′19″W

The original Maggoty Gap was a wind gap in the Blue Ridge Mountains in the counties of Roanoke, Virginia and Franklin, Virginia. Over time, as roads were improved and relocated, the identified location of the gap moved with them. It is now mapped at a spot in Roanoke County.

== Geography ==
"Maggoty Gap" is now named at a location approximately 5 miles (8.0 km) south of Roanoke, Virginia and 12 miles (19 km) north-northwest of Rocky Mount, Virginia at an elevation of 1,125 feet (343 m).

The present identified location of Maggoty Gap (or Willow Branch Gap) on topographic maps is at 37.156°N 79.972°W, which is actually inside the Back Creek watershed, not at the ridge line. But State Road 677 does pass through it (under a railroad trestle) to the highway (US-220) leading to the true ridge line at "Murray Gap", which separates the Maggodee Creek watershed from the Back Creek watershed. (Note: Murray Gap is at 37.140°N 79.972°W Elevation 1250 feet.) This route connects Starkey, Virginia and Boone's Mill, Virginia. An alternate route is State Road 613 (Merriman Rd. & Naff Rd.) through the "Simmonds Gap".

There are also two unimproved ridge line gaps between Simmonds Gap and Murray Gap that lead south to Maggodee Creek. These are reached from Starkey, Virginia via Starlight Road (State Road 615) and Boone's Chapel Road (State Road 614). One is at the end of Boone's Chapel Road where a Jeep trail crosses the Franklin County line at a pipeline and descends to State Road 613 adjacent to the Maggodee Creek bridge. (Note: This "easterly" Old Maggoty Gap is at 37.143°N 79.978°W Elevation 1325 feet.) The other is at the end of Wild Turkey Road (branching southwest from Boone's Chapel Road) and passing just below and east of Milner Place, where it crosses the Franklin County line and descends to Maggodee Creek at the junction of State Road 852 (Guthrie Rd.) and State Road 613. (Note: This "middle" Old Maggoty Gap is at 37.142°N 79.986°W Elevation 1330 feet.)

== History ==
"Maggoty Gap" describes a natural gateway of the Great Wagon Road (locally known as The Carolina Road) that made it possible for wagons and livestock traffic to pass through the Blue Ridge Mountains at Roanoke, Virginia near Maggoty Creek (now called Maggodee Creek). It carried enormous amounts of traffic in the late 18th century and much of the 19th century until a railroad was extended over the ridge in 1892. During the years from 1760 to 1776 it was said to be the heaviest traveled road in all of America.

Morgan Bryan (1671–1763) cut the path for the first wagon to cross the gap from Starkey, Virginia to Boone's Mill, Virginia in 1746 (at age 78). He reported that he had to disassemble his wagon and carry it piecemeal up the last slope. (It reportedly took three months for him and his sons to travel a distance of about 80 miles from Roanoke to their destination at the "Shallow Ford" of the Yadkin River in the vicinity of Winston-Salem, North Carolina.) In 1753, the original 15 Moravians used Bryan's road to get a wagon to their Wachovia Tract located at present-day Winston-Salem, but took a wrong turn and missed Maggoty Gap; instead with great difficulty they traveled over nearby Windy Gap and rejoined Bryan's road at present-day Boone's Mill.

In 1838, Claudius Crozet (1789–1864) surveyed the road for its improvement as the Pittsylvania, Franklin, and Botetourt Turnpike, still made of dirt but with grades generally to be less than 4 percent and the carriageway to be a minimum of 18 feet wide (right-of-way to be a total of 40 feet wide). In his field notes, he had two sketches showing "Maggoty Creek" winding around in the vicinity of the present-day junction of State Roads 613 and 726 (Wades Gap Rd.), and also a road continuing up past the Jacob Naff homestead and John Arthur Road to the "top of the Blue Ridge" where he labeled the present-day Simmonds Gap as "Maggoty Gap". (Note: Simmonds Gap is at 37.160°N 80.005°W Elevation 1635 feet. (This is the most "westerly" of several "Old Maggoty Gaps".)) His sketch showed the road continuing due north down to the cultivated fields of Starkey. He also noted that a nearby path (now called Daybreak Lane) was not "the lowest and best gap". (Note: It must be recognized, however, that Crozet's sketches were not to scale and his notes could be misinterpreted.) The turnpike was built immediately afterward, following the route over Simmonds Gap that eventually has become State Road 613 (Naff Road and Merriman Road). It suffered deterioration during the Civil War years, however, and the turnpike was abandoned by its owners around 1865.

Maggoty Gap lost its economic importance when the paved highway US-220 was completed directly from Roanoke through Murray Gap to Rocky Mount, Virginia around 1930.
