= Morgan Bryan =

American settler

Morgan Bryan led his extended family to the Forks of the Yadkin in the Province of North Carolina, now the state of North Carolina, and founded Bryan's Settlement there. He was known for "establishing critical settlements down the Shenandoah Valley along the Great Wagon Road in the Southeast." Bryan and his wife Martha raised their granddaughter Rebecca Bryan Boone, who became the wife of Daniel Boone.

== Early life ==
Morgan Bryan, of Irish and English ancestry, was born in Denmark in 1671 to Francis and Sarah Bringer (or Brinker) Bryan. His great-great grandfather was Sir Francis Bryan, Lord Justice of Ireland and a close associate of King Henry VIII. Morgan's family left Ireland for Denmark after his grandfather opposed Oliver Cromwell. The Bryans lost titles and family lands that they were unable to recover. Francis returned to Ireland in 1683 and died in Belfast in 1693.

Bryan left Ballyroney, County Down, Ireland and immigrated to Colonial America about 1695. He landed at Roanoke in Colonial Virginia and ultimately went to Philadelphia in Colonial Pennsylvania. He sought to make a fortune and attain religious freedom, as did other Quaker immigrants. His brother William, a Presbyterian, immigrated in 1718.

== Marriage and children ==
Bryan married Martha Strode, (born about 1697), a great-granddaughter of Sir William Strode, in 1719 when he was listed as a member of the New Garden Quaker Meeting of Chester County, his only known Quaker affiliation.

Eight of the Bryan children survived their parents:

- Joseph, the father-in-law of Daniel and "Neddy" Boone, died in Kentucky in 1804 or 1805.
- Eleanor Bryan Linville's husband William and son John were killed by Indians while hunting in the Blue Ridge Mountains in 1766. She and her married children left the Yadkin area after the Revolutionary War. She died in Kentucky in 1792.
- Samuel, a Loyalist colonel during the war. He died in the Yadkin area in 1798.
- Morgan, Jr. died in Kentucky around 1800.
- James, who also helped found Bryan's Station, became a widower in 1770. Rebecca and Daniel Boone raised his six small children after his wife's death. James died in Kentucky in 1807.
- John, a farmer, died in the Bryan Settlements in the winter of 1799–1800.
- William, with his brothers, established Bryan's Station near the present Lexington, Kentucky. He was killed there by Native Americans in May 1780.
- Thomas inherited his father's Deep Creek property but sold it to his brother William and was living elsewhere in the Settlements at the time of his death in 1777.

== Pennsylvania ==
At the time of his marriage, Bryan owned land in Birmingham Township, Chester County of the Pennsylvania Colony. Soon after, he moved to the western side of Chester County, where he may have traded furs with Native Americans for goods along the Conestoga River. He was then a trader with his brother William and the Linville brothers in Lancaster County. From 1726 to 1729, he lived among Quaker farmers in Marlborough Township, Chester County. There, he owned a 137-acre farm.

== Virginia ==
In 1729, Bryan and his friend Alexander Ross explored the Shenandoah Valley for potential colonization. On October 28, 1730, they presented a proposal to the Council of Virginia and the Colonial Governor William Gooch and were granted a 100,000-acre tract for the colonization of 100 families. The tract was located near the present city of Winchester, Virginia. Bryan had connections with the Irish immigrant community who were Ulster Presbyterians and Ross with Quakers, which helped find 70 families that settled the tract of land. Bryan, having sold his farm in 1728, was amongst the first to settle on the tract between Winchester and the Potomac River. He built a house on Mill Creek near what is now Bunker Hill, West Virginia. Bryan acquired 4,000 acres between 1732 and 1746.

Bryan was a land speculator, operating out of offices in what are now Roanoke, Virginia and Berkeley, West Virginia. He was also a surveyor, justice, road overseer, and juror. He lived in two or three locations between the 1730s and 1740s. Over the years, he moved further south into the valley. By 1735, Bryan and his family lived near Winchester on the northeast side of Opequon Creek. Within a few years, they lived in Roanoke County at Big Lick.

When he lived in the Shenandoah Valley, Bryan held Presbyterian services in his home, led by a Presbyterian minister, William Williams. In 1735, he petitioned the colony to allow for a Presbyterian Church to be built near his house and another to be located elsewhere. After Joseph's wife died and he remarried, Bryan and his wife raised granddaughters Rebecca and Martha Bryan.

== North Carolina ==
In the late 1740s, Bryan's children had married and began having children. His sons scouted lands south of the Shenandoah Valley to establish a settlement for his large family, and with Bryan decided to establish themselves on Lord Granville's land south of the Virginia border.

External image
- The Bryan Settlement map

In the fall of 1748, Morgan and Martha Bryan and their children and grandchildren traveled south to the Granville District in the Province of North Carolina. His brother William, who had followed him to Roanoke County stayed there. Son Joseph delayed his move until a later time. Joseph's daughter Rebecca Bryan traveled with Bryan along what became the Great Wagon Road. At that time, it was an old Cherokee path of rough terrain. The journey took three months because he had to clear the path along the way. There were a number of waterway crossings. Bryan, said to be the first settler to use the trail, was said to have needed to take his wagon apart at some point to make it through an impassible area and continue the journey. On November 28, 1748 or in the spring of 1749, the clan settled near Shallow Ford in the Forks of Yadkin, an area that became known as the Bryan Settlement and is now the town of Farmington, North Carolina. Bryan acquired several thousand acres in the Granville District within five years. His sons and his son-in-law William Linville also acquired substantial property. They all lived in Rowan County when it was formed in 1753. At that time, there were more than 1,000 settlers in the county. Referring to his wife, many of the deeds were labeled "Martha's land". Her name was on many more deeds than most colonial women. Bryan continued to earn income as a land speculator, as friends and others from Pennsylvania and Virginia settled in Rowan County into the 1750s. He built a mansion on Deep Creek. He was among the first white men to settle there and was a leader in the community.

Friends that Bryan knew in Virginia moved into the area, including the Boone, Linville, Strode, Hampton, Hunt, and Bryan families. Moravians also moved into the Yadkin River valley area and provided religious support for the Bryans, including performing baptisms and wedding ceremonies. Four of his family members married into the Boone family. His son William married Mary Boone, Squire Boone's daughter. His granddaughters, Rebecca and Martha, married brothers Daniel and Edward Boone, respectively. Granddaughter Nancy Linville married George. Daniel, Edward, and George were sons of Squire Boone.

Settlers were attacked by Native Americans during the Anglo-Cherokee War (1758–1761), which caused the deaths of hundreds of people and resulted in about a hundred families leaving the area. Of those who remained, some went to Fort Dobbs for safety. Bryan was a regional leader in the militia during the war. Bryan's sons also joined the local militia during the war. His son Captain Morgan Bryan Jr. led militiamen throughout the area to guard settlements. There was ongoing conflict in the region up to and including the Revolutionary War.

Dr. Robert W. Ramsey said that Bryan was "the most prominent of the settlers in northwestern Carolina before 1752" in his book Carolina Cradle: Settlement of the Northwestern Carolina Frontier, 1747 – 1767.

== Death ==
External images
- Martha Bryan Tombstone, Rowan Museum
- Bryan Settlement Cemetery, a marker for Morgan and Martha Byran

Martha Strode Bryan died August 24, 1762. (Note: Charles W. Bryan, Jr. says that Martha Strode Bryan died in 1747.) Morgan Bryan died on April 3, 1763, on Easter Sunday. They were both believed to have been buried on their Deep Creek property. Martha Bryan's tombstone is now at the Rowan Museum in Salisbury. It was found in northeastern Davie County during the construction of a highway. A historic marker in Advance, North Carolina identifies the site of the Bryan Settlement Cemetery and their house and tells of Morgan and Martha's roles as settlers in the region.

Bryan's sons had influential roles during the American Revolutionary War. Son Samuel served for the Torys, while James, John, Joseph, William, and Morgan fought for the colonists. The sons were also influential in the early settlement of Kentucky County, Virginia, now the state of Kentucky. Granddaughter Rebecca Bryan Boone became the wife of Daniel Boone and attained fame as a pioneer woman.

== See also ==
- Abram's Delight, Winchester, Virginia
- Carolina Road
- Great Wagon Road
- Huntsville, North Carolina
- Maggoty Gap
- Katharine Steel, who, like Morgan's granddaughter Rebecca Boone, raised and protected her children in the wilderness of Colonial North Carolina

== Sources ==
- Bryan, Charles W. Jr. (1962). "Morgan Bryan, Pioneer on the Opequon and Yadkin". The Virginia Magazine of History and Biography. 70 (2): 154–164. ISSN 0042-6636.
- Henderson, Archibald (1920). The conquest of the old Southwest; the romantic story of the early pioneers into Virginia, the Carolinas, Tennessee, and Kentucky, 1740-1790. New York, Century.
- Phillips, Marcia D. (2022). Historic Shallow Ford in Yadkin Valley: Crossroads Between East and West. Arcadia Publishing. ISBN 978-1-4671-5290-7.
