= South Mayo River =

Location
- Country: United States

Physical characteristics
- Source
  - location: Virginia
- Mouth: Mayo River
  - coordinates: 36.54056°N 79.98945°W

The South Mayo River is a river in the United States state of Virginia.

== See also ==
- List of rivers of Virginia
