= North Mayo River =

Coordinates: 36.542604°N 79.987565°W

Location
- Country: United States

Physical characteristics
- Source
  - location: Virginia

The North Mayo River is a river in the United States state of Virginia.

== See also ==
- List of rivers of Virginia
