= Amsterdam, Virginia =

Unincorporated community in Virginia, United States

Amsterdam
- Unincorporated community
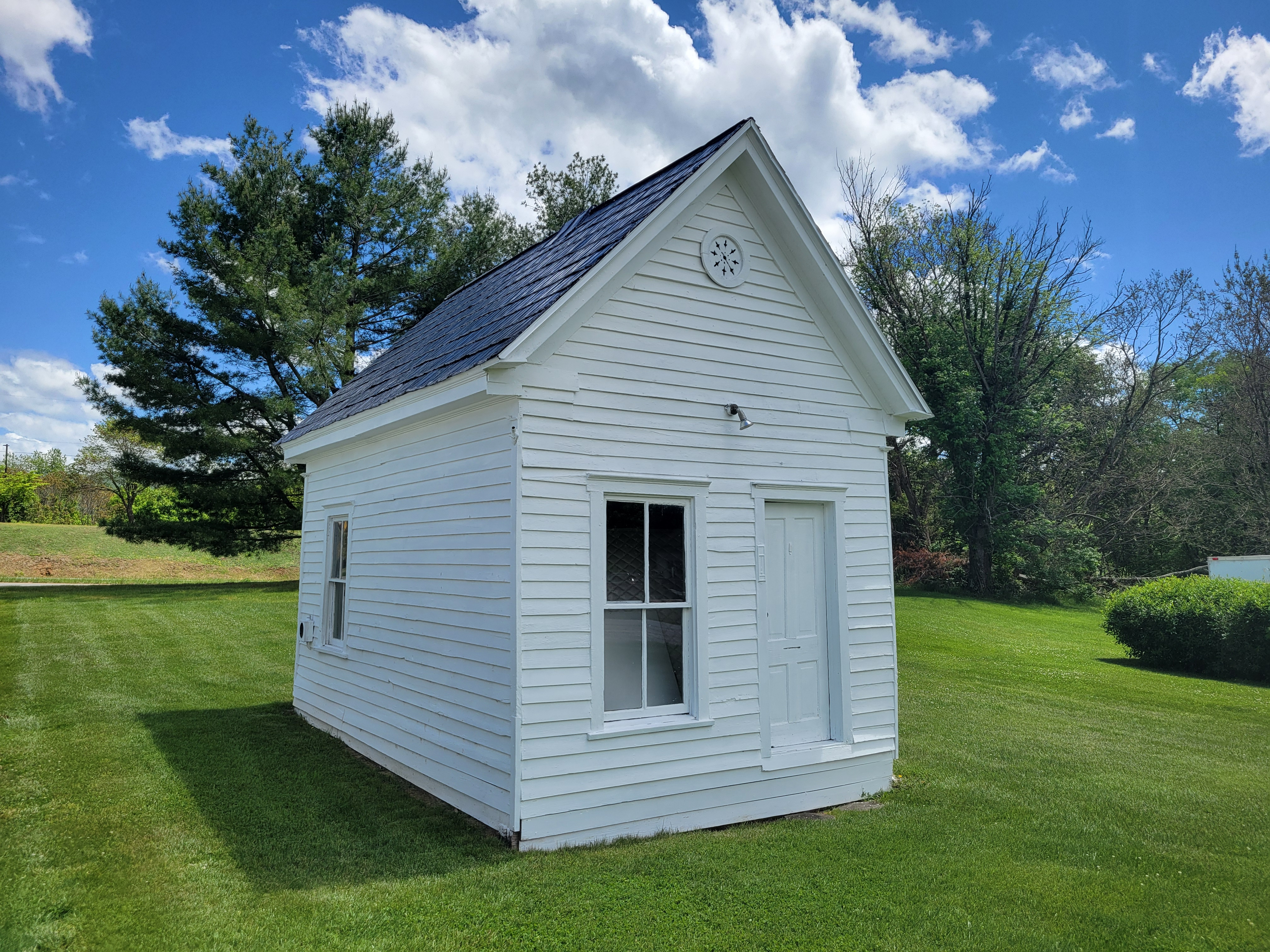
- Amsterdam Post Office circa 1828-1964

- Location within the Commonwealth of Virginia Amsterdam (the United States)
- Coordinates: 37°25′38″N 79°54′22″W
- Country: United States
- State: Virginia
- County: Botetourt
- Time zone: UTC−5 (Eastern (EST))
  - Summer (DST): UTC−4 (EDT)

Amsterdam is an unincorporated community in Botetourt County, Virginia, United States.

In an 1855 gazetteer, it was listed as "a post-village" (stagecoach stop) that contained "1 brick church and several tradesmen's shops."
