= Reed Creek (Virginia) =

Coordinates: 36°43′19.49″N 79°56′21.15″W

Location
- Country: United States

Physical characteristics
- Source
  - location: Virginia

Reed Creek is a tributary to the Smith River in the United States state of Virginia. Reed Creek is in the Streams category for Henry County, Virginia. Reed Creek is displayed on the Martinsville West USGS quad topo map for Martinsville, Virginia. The approximate elevation of Reed Creek is 722 feet (220 meters) above sea level. Reed Creek is also displayed on the USGS quad maps for Bassett, Virginia and Snow Creek, Virginia.

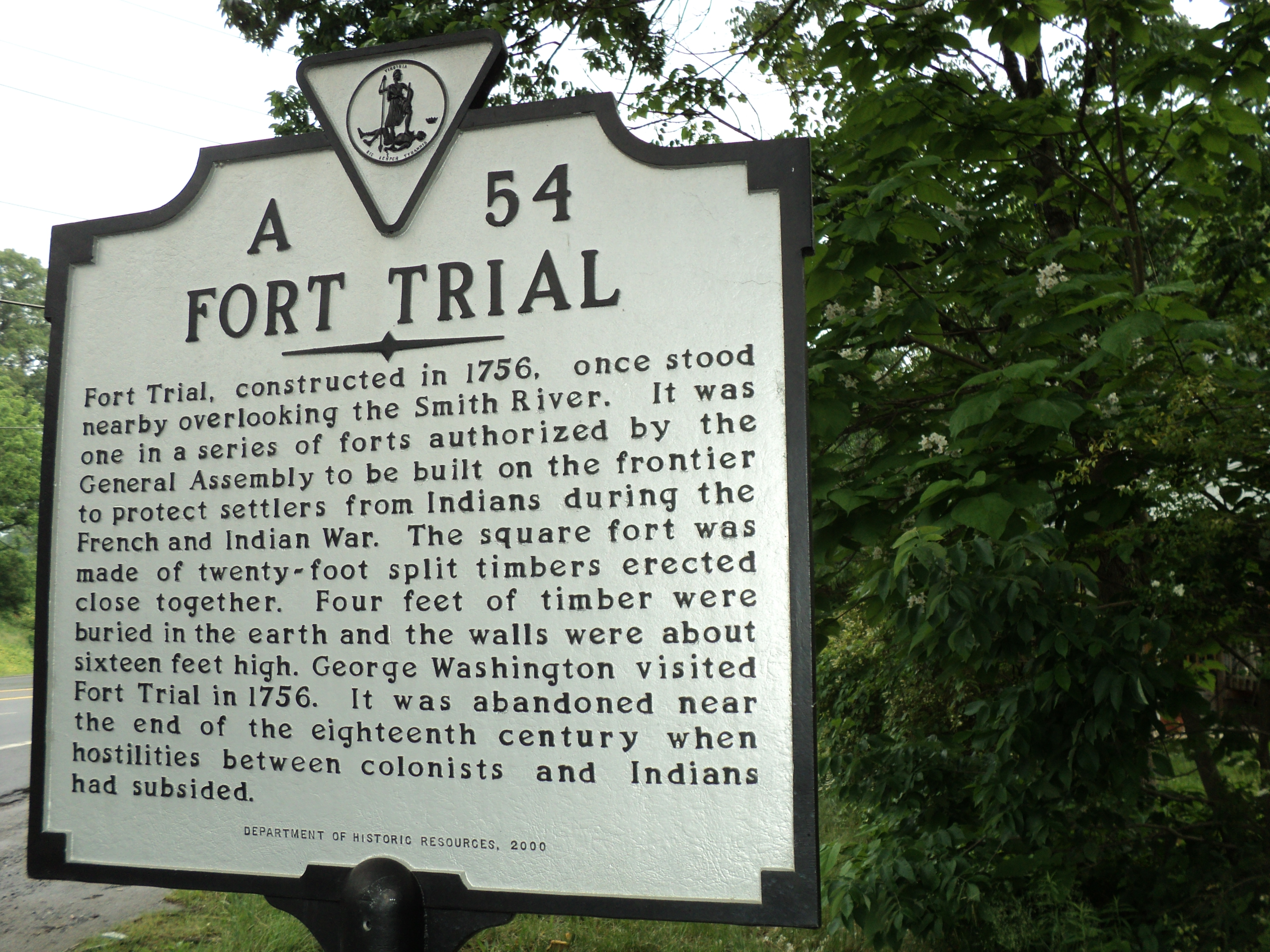
Virginia state historical marker for Fort Trial, built in 1756 near present-day Bassett

"In the mid-1700s, the forts of Mayo and Trial were built as part of a line of forts constructed to protect the settlers from Indians throughout the colonies. Fort Trial was on the Smith River, at the mouth of Reed Creek, near the town that today is called Martinsville. George Washington visited both of these remote outposts during his 1756 inspection of frontier forts."

== See also ==
- List of rivers of Virginia

== Bibliography ==
- USGS Geographic Names Information Service
- USGS Hydrologic Unit Map - State of Virginia (1974)
- Salmon, Emily J.; Edward D. C. Campbell, Jr., eds. (1994). The Hornbook of Virginia History (4th ed.). Richmond, VA: Virginia Office of Graphic Communications. ISBN 0-88490-177-7.
