= Pennsylvania Route 316 =

State highway in Franklin County, Pennsylvania, US

Pennsylvania Route 316

Route information
- Maintained by PennDOT
- Length: 16.641 mi (26.781 km)

Major junctions
- South end: MD 60 at the Maryland state line near Waynesboro
- PA 16 in Waynesboro; PA 914 in Guilford Township; I-81 in Chambersburg
- North end: US 11 in Chambersburg

Location
- Country: United States
- State: Pennsylvania
- Counties: Franklin

Highway system
- Pennsylvania State Route System; Interstate; US; State; Scenic; Legislative
← PA 315	→ PA 317

Pennsylvania Route 316 (PA 316) is a 16.6-mile-long (26.7 km) state highway located in Franklin County, Pennsylvania. The southern terminus is at the Maryland state line near Waynesboro, where the road continues into that state as Maryland Route 60 (MD 60). The northern terminus is at U.S. Route 11 (US 11) in Chambersburg. PA 316 heads north from the state line through rural land to Waynesboro, where it forms a concurrency with PA 16. From here, the route continues through farmland, intersecting PA 914 south of New Franklin. PA 316 reaches Chambersburg and runs through developed area, coming to an interchange with Interstate 81 (I-81) before ending at US 11.

PA 316 was designated in 1928 between the Maryland border south of Waynesboro and US 11 in Chambersburg, following Anthony Highway, State Hill Road, and Clayton Avenue to Waynesboro before picking up its current alignment. In 1937, the current alignment south of Waynesboro became a southern extension of PA 997 while PA 316 was extended north from Chambersburg to PA 944 south of Upper Strasburg. In the 1940s, the route swapped alignments with PA 997 south of Waynesboro while the north end was cut back to US 11 in Chambersburg, with most of the former alignment north of Chambersburg removed for the Letterkenny Army Depot.

== Route description ==
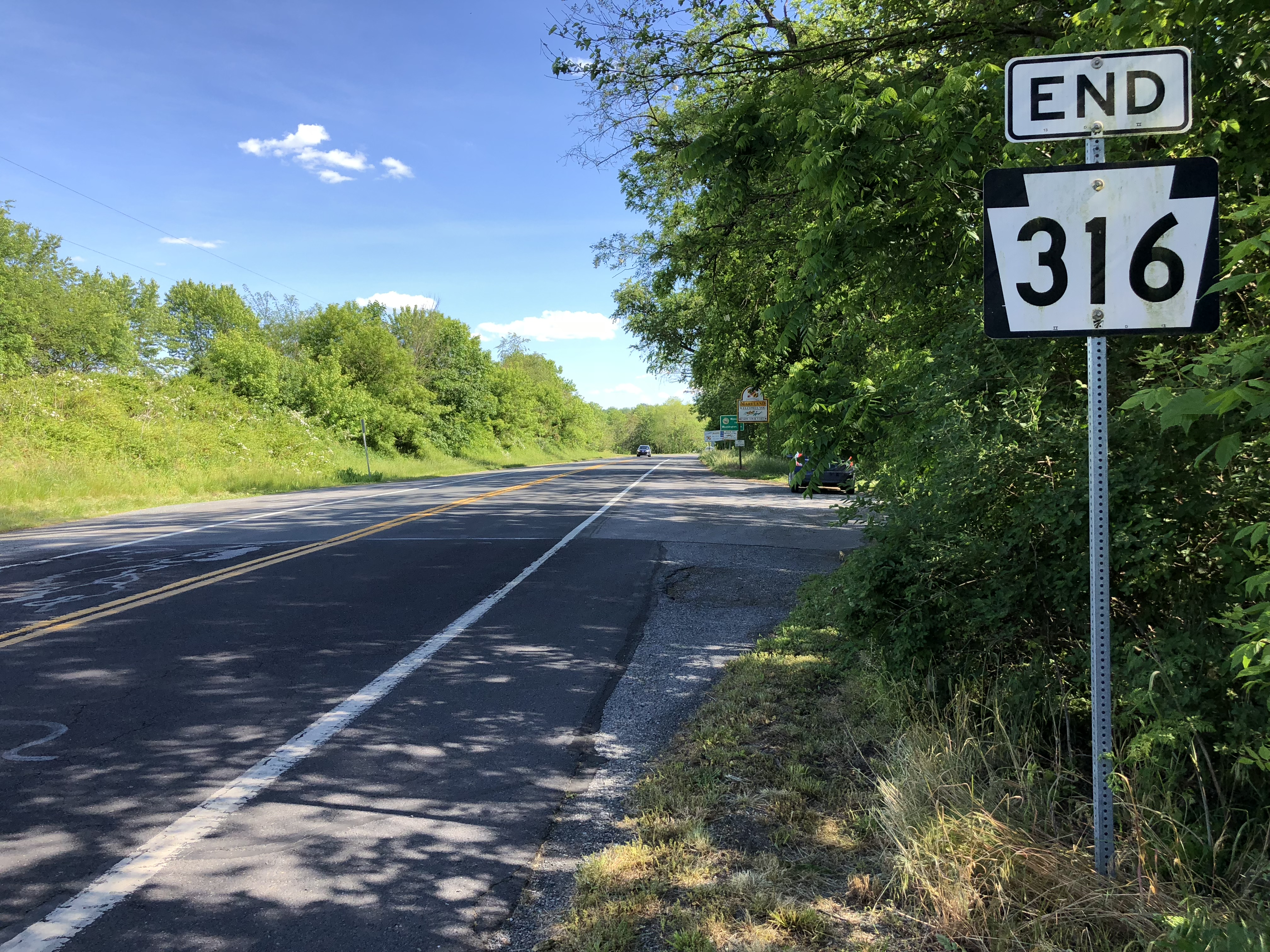
PA 316 southbound at its southern terminus at MD 60 at the Maryland border in Washington Township

PA 316 begins at the Maryland border in Washington Township, heading north on two-lane undivided Wayne Highway. The road continues south into Maryland as MD 60. From the state line, the route heads through a mix of farms and woods with some homes, making a turn to the northeast. PA 316 continues through open farmland before entering the borough of Waynesboro, where it becomes Potomac Street and passes homes and businesses. In the downtown area of Waynesboro, PA 316 intersects PA 16 and turns northwest to form a brief concurrency with that route on Main Street. PA 316 splits from PA 16 by heading north on Grant Street, where it is lined with residences. The route makes a curve to the northwest and leaves Waynesboro for Washington Township, becoming Wayne Highway again as it heads into agricultural areas with scattered development. The road continues into Quincy Township. Here, PA 316 reaches the community of Five Forks and turns to the north, continuing through more farmland as it passes through Elbrook. The road crosses CSX's Lurgan Subdivision railroad line at-grade and passes through Jugtown and Altenwald, running a short distance to the west of the railroad tracks.

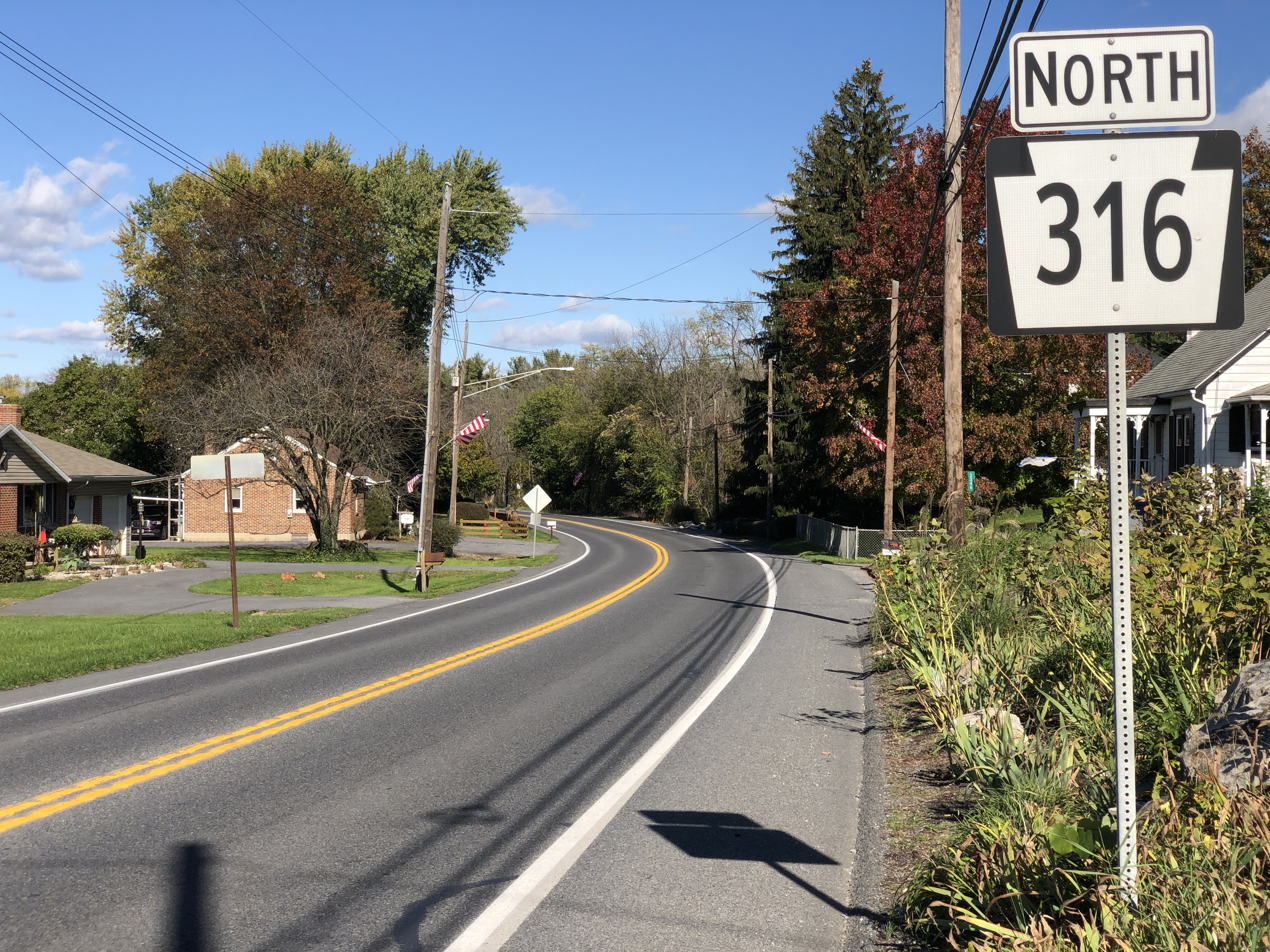
PA 316 northbound in Guilford Township

The route heads farther from the Lurgan Subdivision as it turns northwest into Guilford Township and becomes Wayne Road, passing through a mix of farms, woods, and homes. PA 316 curves to the north as it comes to the PA 914 junction and passes through the residential community of New Franklin. The road comes to a bridge over the CSX line and passes more farms before heading into commercial areas and widening into a four-lane divided highway as it has an interchange with I-81. After this, the road enters the borough of Chambersburg and becomes Wayne Avenue, a five-lane road with a center left-turn lane that passes more businesses. Farther northwest, PA 316 narrows into a two-lane road that passes homes. The route comes to a bridge over Norfolk Southern's Lurgan Branch railroad line and passes near industrial establishments before heading north near more homes on 2nd Street and ending at northbound US 11.

== History ==
When routes were legislated in Pennsylvania in 1911, what is now PA 316 was not given a number. PA 316 was designated in 1928 to run from the Maryland border south of Waynesboro north to US 11 in Chambersburg. The route followed Anthony Highway, State Hill Road, and Clayton Avenue north to PA 16 in Waynesboro before it picked up its present alignment to Chambersburg. Upon designation, the route was paved between the state line and PA 16 and Waynesboro and between New Franklin and Chambersburg. By 1930, PA 316 was under construction between Waynesboro and Elbrook. PA 316 was extended north from Chambersburg to PA 944 south of Upper Strasburg in 1937, running concurrent with US 11 to downtown Chambersburg and following US 30 west before heading northwest along Franklin Street and Edenville Road towards Upper Strasburg. At this time, the entire length of PA 316 was paved. In addition, the current route along Wayne Highway and Potomac Street south of Waynesboro became a southern extension of PA 997 in 1937, which was paved. In the 1940s, PA 316 and PA 997 switched alignments south of Waynesboro, with PA 316 routed to follow Wayne Highway and Potomac Street between MD 60 at the Maryland border and PA 16 in Waynesboro. In addition, the north end of PA 316 reverted to US 11 in Chambersburg, with a portion of the former route north of Chambersburg becoming an unnumbered road while most of the road between Chambersburg and Upper Strasburg was removed to make way for the Letterkenny Army Depot.

== Major intersections ==
The entire route is in Franklin County.

Location	mi	km	Destinations	Notes
Washington Township	0.000	0.000	MD 60 west (Leitersburg Pike) – Hagerstown	Maryland state line; southern terminus
Waynesboro	2.946	4.741	PA 16 east (Main Street) – Rouzerville, Gettysburg, Emmitsburg, MD, Westminster, MD	South end of PA 16 concurrency
Waynesboro	3.059	4.923	PA 16 west (Main Street) – Greencastle	North end of PA 16 concurrency
Guilford Township	12.326	19.837	PA 914 west (Swamp Fox Road) – Marion	Eastern terminus of PA 914
Chambersburg	15.191– 15.208	24.448– 24.475	I-81 – Hagerstown, Carlisle	Exit 14 (I-81)
Chambersburg	16.641	26.781	US 11 north (Garfield Street / 2nd Street) – Shippensburg, Carlisle	Northern terminus; northbound US 11 only
1.000 mi = 1.609 km; 1.000 km = 0.621 mi: Concurrency terminus; Incomplete access
