= Pennsylvania Route 914 =

State highway in Franklin County, Pennsylvania, US

Pennsylvania Route 914
- Swamp Fox Road

Route information
- Maintained by PennDOT
- Length: 4.432 mi (7.133 km)
- Existed: 1928–present

Major junctions
- West end: US 11 in Guilford Township
- I-81 in Guilford Township
- East end: PA 316 in Guilford Township

Location
- Country: United States
- State: Pennsylvania
- Counties: Franklin

Highway system
- Pennsylvania State Route System; Interstate; US; State; Scenic; Legislative
← PA 913	→ PA 915

Pennsylvania Route 914 (PA 914) is a 4-mile-long (6.4 km) state highway located in Franklin County, Pennsylvania. The western terminus is at U.S. Route 11 (US 11) in Guliford Township. The eastern terminus is at PA 316 in Guilford Township. PA 914 heads southeast from US 11 on two-lane undivided Swamp Fox Road, passing through Marion and coming to an interchange with Interstate 81 (I-81). The route heads into Antrim Township, where it turns northeast and heads back into Guilford Township to come to its terminus. Swamp Fox Road was paved in stages, with the entire length paved in the 1940s. PA 914 was designated onto its current alignment in the 1960s.

== Route description ==
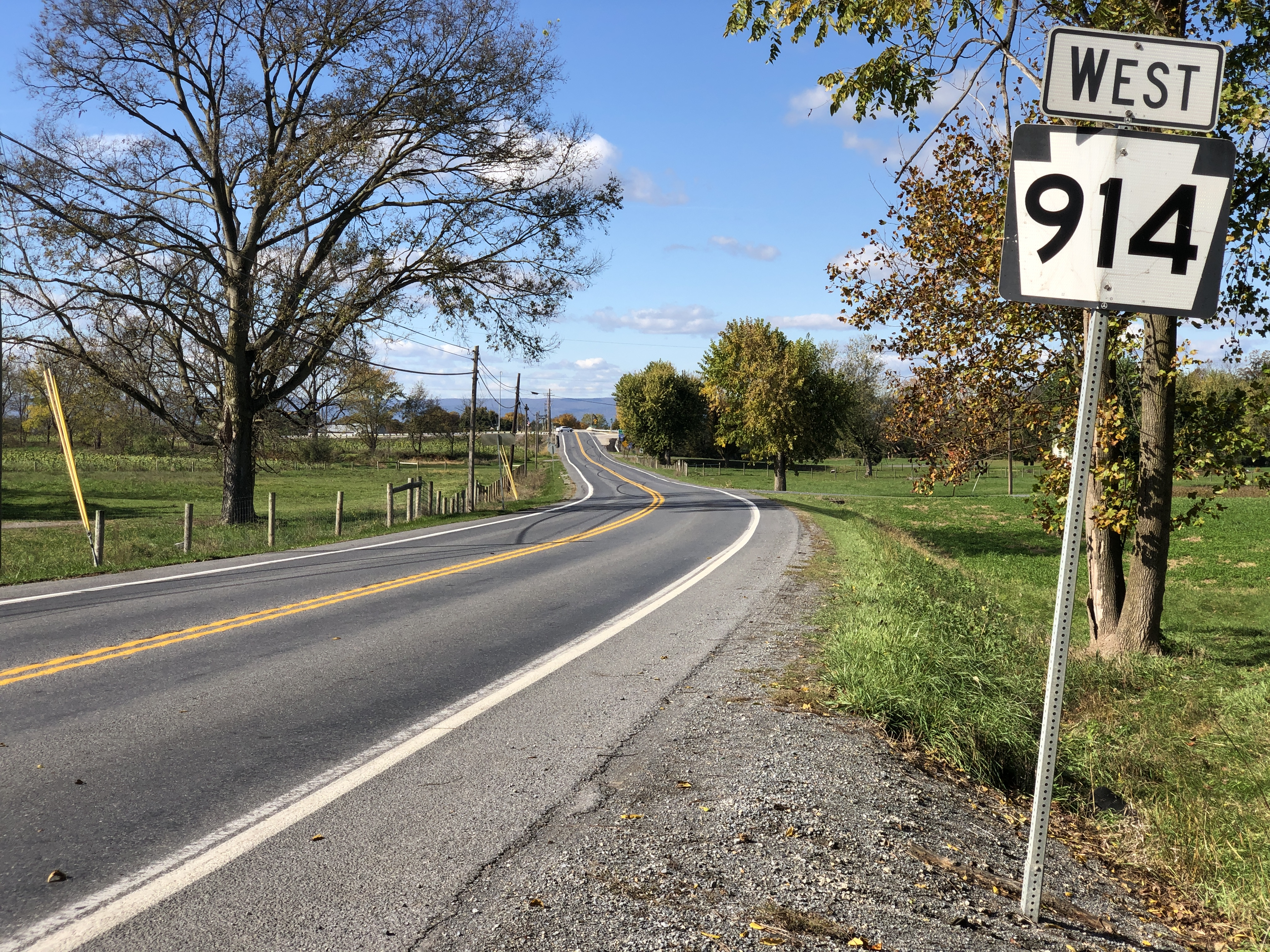
PA 914 westbound in Guilford Township

PA 914 begins at an intersection with US 11 in the community of Marion in Guliford Township, heading southeast on two-lane undivided Swamp Fox Road. The road heads through farmland and crosses Norfolk Southern's Lurgan Branch. The route turns to the east and reaches an interchange with I-81. Past here, PA 914 continues southeast through more agricultural areas, crossing into Antrim Township. Here, the route turns northeast at Marion Road to stay on Swamp Fox Road and crosses back into Guilford Township. PA 914 continues through open farmland before ending at PA 316.

== History ==
When Pennsylvania legislated routes in 1911, what is now PA 914 was not given a number. At this time, the road between Marion and the border of Guilford and Antrim townships was paved. Swamp Fox Road between the township line and PA 316 was originally an unpaved road. In the 1930s, all of Swamp Fox Road was paved except for the portion near Marion Road, which was an improved road. The improved section of the road was paved in the 1940s. PA 914 was designated in the 1960s to run on its current alignment from US 11 in Marion east to PA 316 south of New Franklin, with an interchange at I-81 east of Marion.

== Major intersections ==
The entire route is in Franklin County.

Location	mi	km	Destinations	Notes
Guilford Township	0.000	0.000	US 11 (Molly Pitcher Highway) – Greencastle, Chambersburg	Western terminus
Guilford Township	0.945	1.521	I-81 – Chambersburg, Hagerstown	Exit 10 on I-81
Guilford Township	4.432	7.133	PA 316 (Wayne Road) – Chambersburg, Waynesboro	Eastern terminus
1.000 mi = 1.609 km; 1.000 km = 0.621 mi
