= Greene Township, Franklin County, Pennsylvania =

Township in Pennsylvania, US

Coordinates: 40°01′00″N 77°36′59″W

- Township
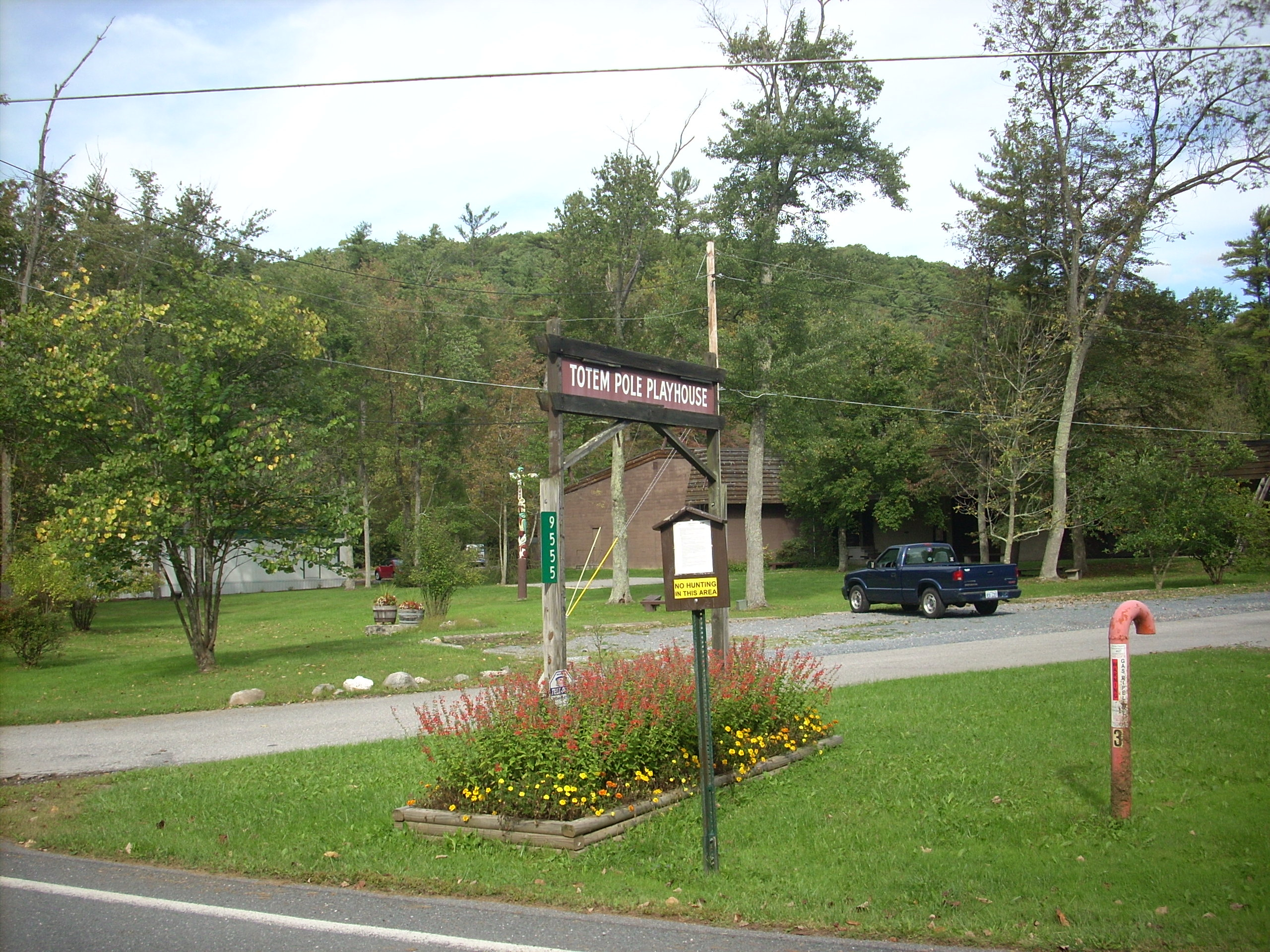
- Totem Pole Playhouse at Caledonia State Park

- Flag Seal

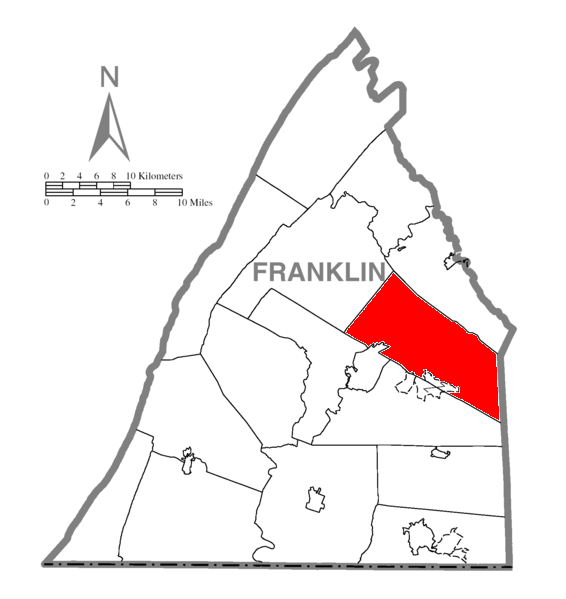
- Map of Franklin County, Pennsylvania highlighting Greene Township

- Map of Franklin County, Pennsylvania
- Country: United States
- State: Pennsylvania
- County: Franklin
- Settled: 1744
- Incorporated: 1787

Government
  - Type: Board of Supervisors
  - Chairman: Charles D. Jamison, Jr.
  - Vice Chairman: Glenn O. Shetter
  - Supervisor: Todd E. Burns

Area
  - Total: 57.32 sq mi (148.45 km^{2})
  - Land: 57.30 sq mi (148.41 km^{2})
  - Water: 0.012 sq mi (0.03 km^{2})

Population (2020)
  - Total: 18,436
  - Estimate (2016): 17,554
  - Density: 306.3/sq mi (118.28/km^{2})
- Time zone: UTC-5 (Eastern (EST))
  - Summer (DST): UTC−4 (EDT)
- Area code: 717
- FIPS code: 42-055-30944
- Website: greenetwp.org

Greene Township is a township in Franklin County, Pennsylvania, United States. The population was 18,436 at the 2020 census, up from 12,284 at the 2000 census. Part of Caledonia State Park is in Greene Township.

== History ==
The township has the name of Nathanael Greene, American general.

The James Finley House, Corker Hill, and Culbertson–Harbison Farm are listed on the National Register of Historic Places.

== Geography ==
Greene Township is in eastern Franklin County, bordered to the east by Adams County. The township is bordered to the southwest by the borough of Chambersburg, the county seat. The primary settlement is the unincorporated community of Scotland in the center of the township. Fayetteville is located along the southern border of the township. Part of the Letterkenny Army Depot is in the west. Green Village and Culbertson are located between the Army Depot and Scotland.

The township is primarily in the Great Appalachian Valley, with the eastern portion climbing the slopes of South Mountain. Caledonia State Park is on the eastern edge of the township, and Michaux State Forest occupies much of the remaining portions of the mountain in the township.

Interstate 81 and U.S. Route 11 cross the township from north to south. Access to I-81 is from Exit 17 at the southern boundary and from Exit 20 at Scotland. US-11 passes through Green Village and leads south into Chambersburg and northeast to Shippensburg. U.S. Route 30 passes through the southeast corner of the township, serving Fayetteville and leading east to Gettysburg and west to Chambersburg.

According to the United States Census Bureau, the township has a total area of 57.3 square miles (148.4 km^{2}), of which 0.01 square miles (0.03 km^{2}), or 0.02%, is water. The township is primarily drained by Conococheague Creek, which rises on South Mountain and enters the township at Caledonia Park, flowing west then south to Chambersburg and ultimately to the Potomac River. The northern corner of the township drains north via Rowe Run to Conodoguinet Creek, a tributary of the Susquehanna River.

=== Neighboring Townships ===
- Franklin Township (Adams County), (east)
- Guilford Township (south)
- Hamilton Township (southwest)
- Letterkenny Township (northwest)
- Southampton Township (north)

== Communities ==
- Brownsville
- Caledonia Park
- Cold Spring
- Culbertson Station
- Fayetteville
- Green Village
- Guilford
- Mount Union
- Nyesville
- Red Bridge
- Salem
- Scotland
- Smoketown
- Woodstock

== Demographics ==
Historical population
Census	Pop.	Note	%±
2000	12,284		—
2010	16,700		35.9%
2020	18,436		10.4%
2016 (est.)	17,554		5.1%
U.S. Decennial Census

As of the census of 2000, there were 12,284 people, 5,022 households, and 3,676 families residing in the township. The population density was 216.4 inhabitants per square mile (83.6/km^{2}). There were 5,309 housing units at an average density of 93.5 per square mile (36.1/km^{2}). The racial makeup of the township was 96.39% White, 1.54% African American, 0.08% Native American, 0.71% Asian, 0.10% Pacific Islander, 0.46% from other races, and 0.72% from two or more races. Hispanic or Latino of any race were 1.31% of the population.

There were 5,022 households, out of which 29.3% had children under the age of 18 living with them, 62.2% were married couples living together, 7.0% had a female householder with no husband present, and 26.8% were non-families. 22.8% of all households were made up of individuals, and 12.2% had someone living alone who was 65 years of age or older. The average household size was 2.45 and the average family size was 2.86.

In the township the population was spread out, with 22.9% under the age of 18, 6.5% from 18 to 24, 27.6% from 25 to 44, 25.3% from 45 to 64, and 17.7% who were 65 years of age or older. The median age was 40 years. For every 100 females, there were 94.4 males. For every 100 females age 18 and over, there were 91.2 males.

The median income for a household in the township was $44,380, and the median income for a family was $51,506. Males had a median income of $32,336 versus $25,675 for females. The per capita income for the township was $23,288. About 4.5% of families and 6.0% of the population were below the poverty line, including 7.6% of those under age 18 and 8.1% of those age 65 or over.
