= James Finley House =

James Finley House may refer to:

- James Finley House (Harshaw, Arizona), listed on the National Register of Historic Places in Santa Cruz County, Arizona
- James Finley House (Chambersburg, Pennsylvania), listed on the National Register of Historic Places in Franklin County, Pennsylvania

== See also ==
- Finley House (disambiguation)
