= Smoketown =

Smoketown is a name given various areas populated by African Americans in the United States. The term may refer to:

- Smoketown, Louisville, a neighborhood of Louisville, Kentucky
- Smoketown, Pennsylvania, a census-designated place in Lancaster County
- Smoketown, Franklin County, Pennsylvania, an unincorporated community
- Smoketown: The Untold Story of the Other Great Black Renaissance, a book about Pittsburgh's accomplished and historic African American community by Mark Whitaker
