= Finley House =

Finley House may refer to:

- James Finley House (Patagonia, Arizona), listed on the National Register of Historic Places in Santa Cruz County, Arizona
- James Finley House (Chambersburg, Pennsylvania), listed on the National Register of Historic Places in Franklin County, Pennsylvania
- Ebenezer Finley House, Buffalo, Ohio
- Eugene L. Finley House, Abilene, Texas
- Thomas B. Finley House, North Wilkesboro, North Carolina
- Thomas B. Finley Law Office, Wilkesboro, North Carolina

== See also ==
- James Finley House (disambiguation)
