= Gass House =

Historic house in Pennsylvania, United States

- U.S. National Register of Historic Places
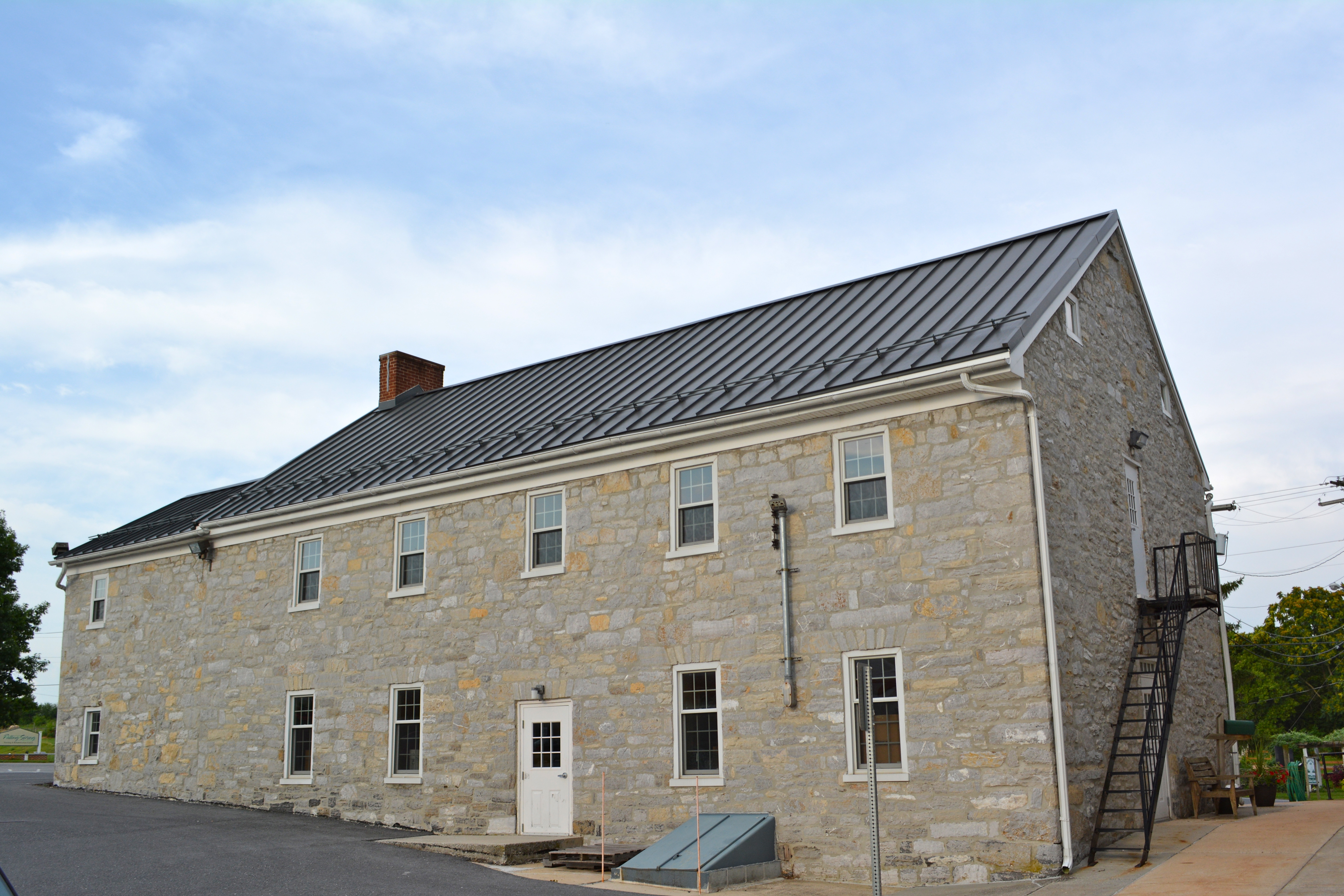

- Location within Pennsylvania Location within the United States
- Location: East of Chambersburg off U.S. Route 30, Guilford Township
- Coordinates: 39°55′46″N 77°37′46″W
- Area: 0.4 acres (0.16 ha)
- Built: c. 1760
- NRHP reference No.: 77001168
- Added to NRHP: April 11, 1977

The Gass House, also known as Gass Family Home, Farm House at Franklin Farms, and Union Plantation, is an historic home which is located in Guilford Township in Franklin County, Pennsylvania.

It was listed on the National Register of Historic Places in 1977.

== History and architectural features ==
Built sometime around 1760, this historic structure is a two-and-one-half-story, five-bay, fieldstone dwelling. It has a two-story, two-bay-by-two-bay limestone extension on the north side, and is an example of Scotch-Irish farmhouse architecture.

William Gass, a fuller who had immigrated from Ireland, built the house circa 1760, and left it to his brother Benjamin. Benjamin's son, Patrick Gass, was born in the house. Patrick later became a soldier and a carpenter and was an important member of the Lewis and Clark Expedition. Although Patrick was in line to inherit the house, it is unclear whether he ever lived in it as the owner. In 1808, the house was sold to the county for use as an almshouse.
