= Corker Hill =

Historic house in Pennsylvania, United States

- U.S. National Register of Historic Places
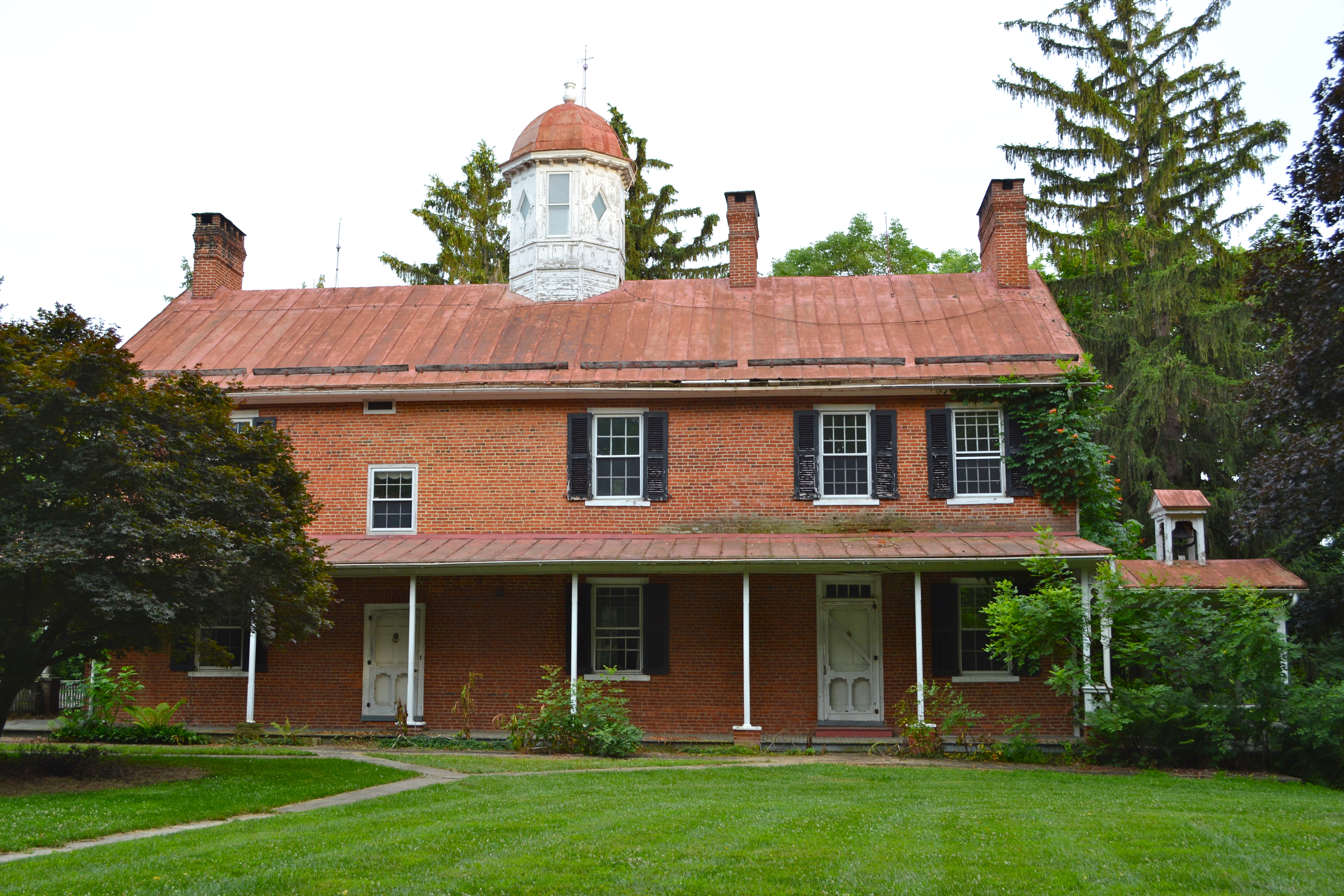

- Location within Pennsylvania Location within the United States
- Location: 1237 Garver Ln. Scotland, Greene Township, Pennsylvania
- Coordinates: 39°58′27″N 77°34′51″W
- Area: 34.5 acres (14.0 ha)
- Built: 1810
- Architectural style: Federal, Colonial Revival
- NRHP reference No.: 03000131
- Added to NRHP: March 18, 2003

Corker Hill is a historic home and farm complex located at Greene Township in Franklin County, Pennsylvania. The manor house was built between 1810 and 1820, and is a two-story, seven-bay, brick dwelling on a limestone foundation in the Federal style. The facade was modified about 1905, to add Colonial Revival style elements, such as a cupola and wraparound porch. Also on the property are the contributing large stone and frame Pennsylvania bank barn, stone vaulted root cellar, frame shed / chicken coop, frame carriage house / garage, small stone furnace building, wagon shed / corn crib, and frame tenant house (c. 1870).

It was listed on the National Register of Historic Places in 1974.

== Gallery ==
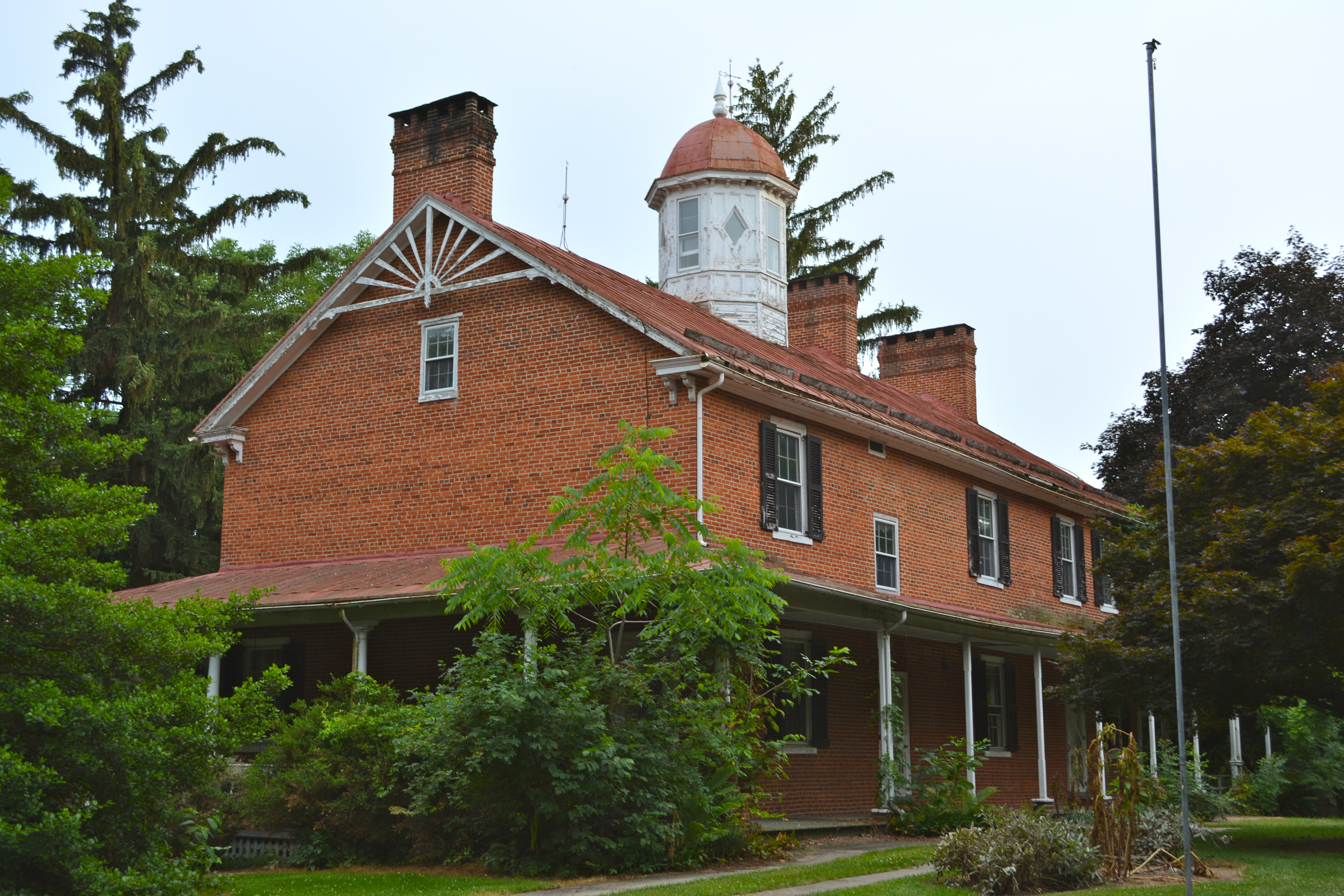
Manor House

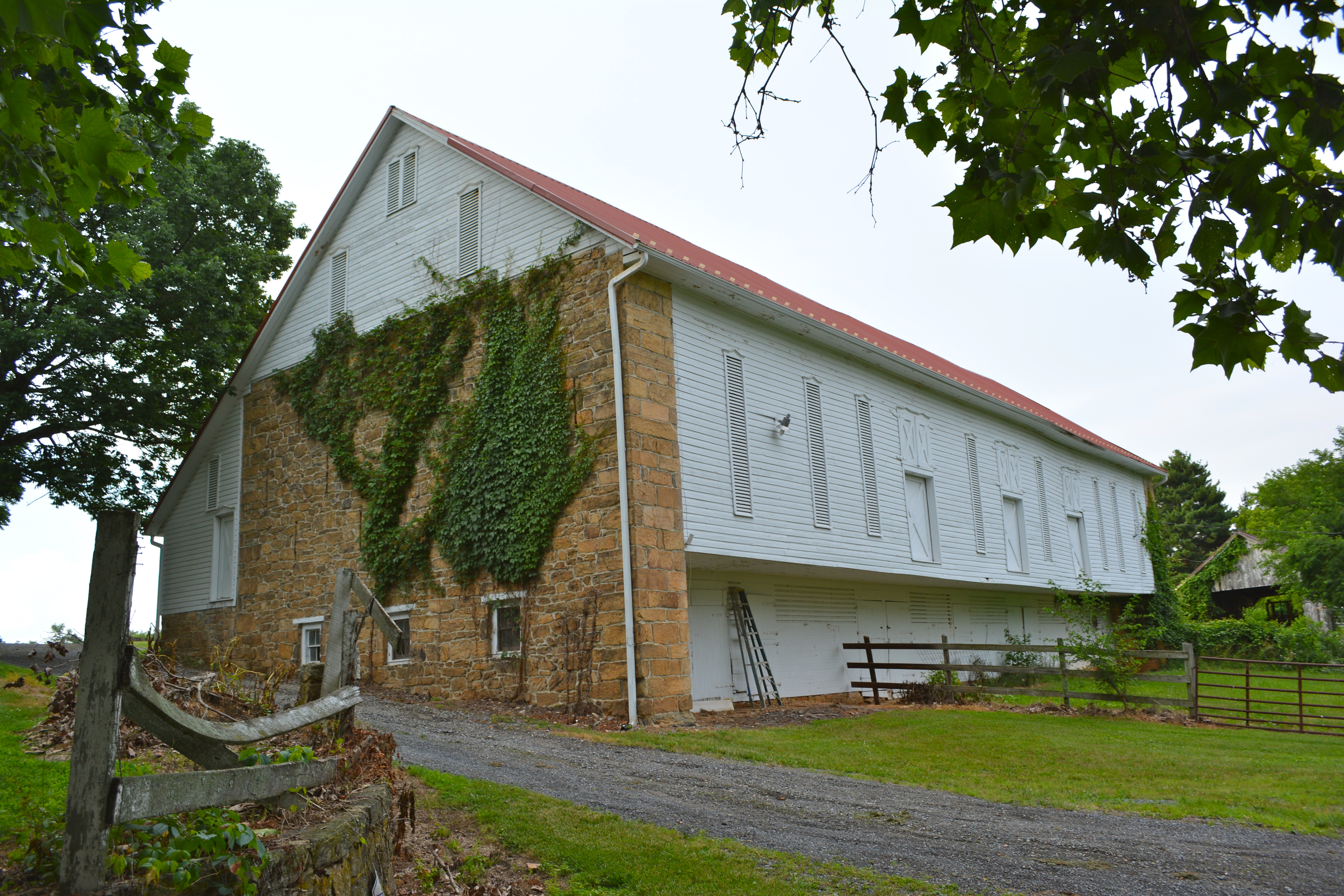
Barn

== See also ==
- Frank Thomson
