= Brotherton Farm =

Historic building in Pennsylvania, United States

- U.S. National Register of Historic Places
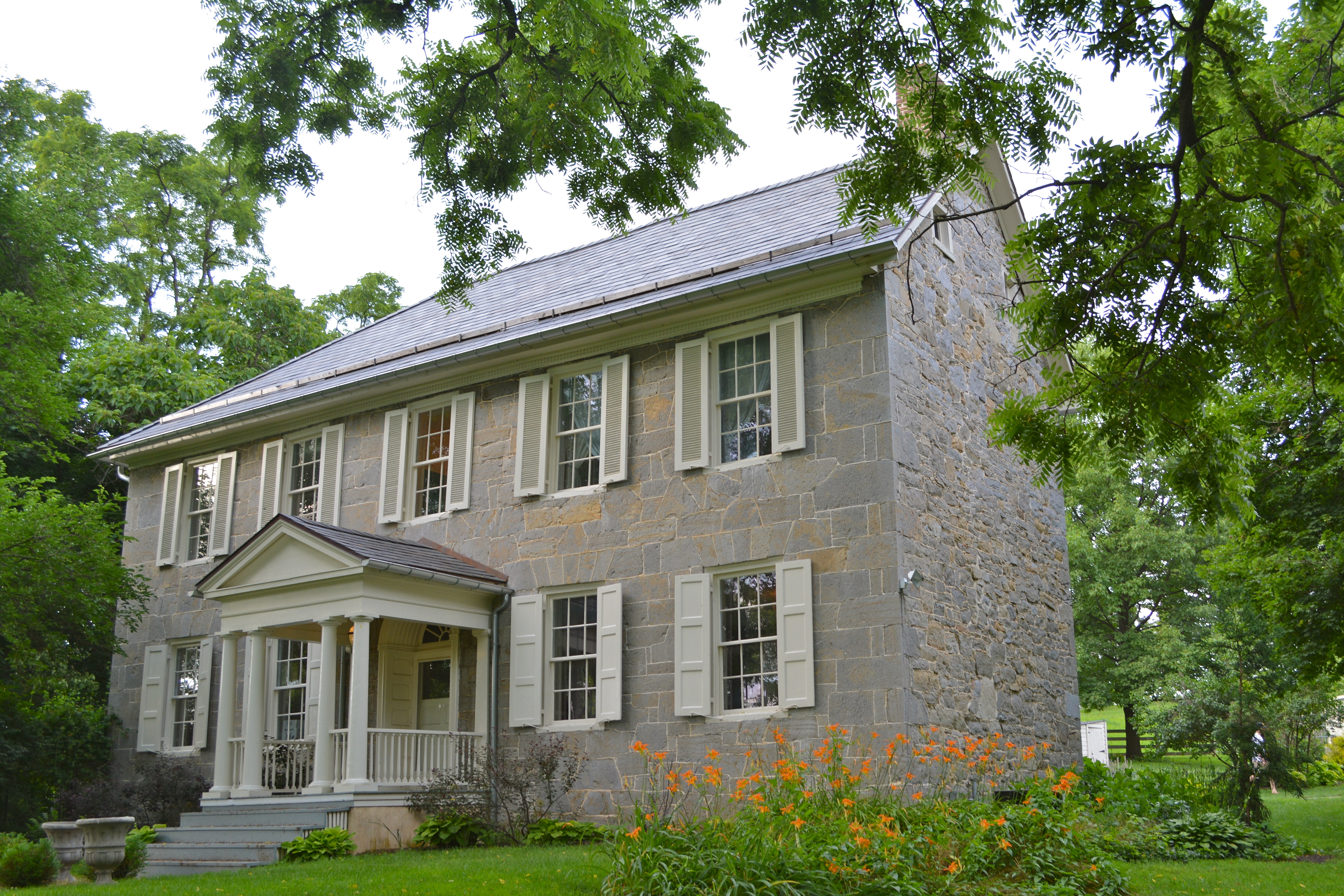

- Location within Pennsylvania Location within the United States
- Location: Southwest of Chambersburg on Falling Spring Road, Guilford Township
- Coordinates: 39°54′43″N 77°36′58″W
- Area: 7.9 acres (3.2 ha)
- Built: c. 1820
- Architectural style: Federal
- NRHP reference No.: 79002227
- Added to NRHP: March 30, 1979

Brotherton Farm, also known as the Brotherton-McKenzie Farm, is a historic home and farm complex located in Guilford Township in Franklin County, Pennsylvania. The house was built around 1820, and is a two-story, five-bay, L-shaped limestone dwelling in the Federal style. It has a two-story, four-bay rear ell. Also on the property are the contributing 1 1/2-story stone spring house, frame wash house, and frame bank barn.

It was listed on the National Register of Historic Places in 1979.

== Gallery ==
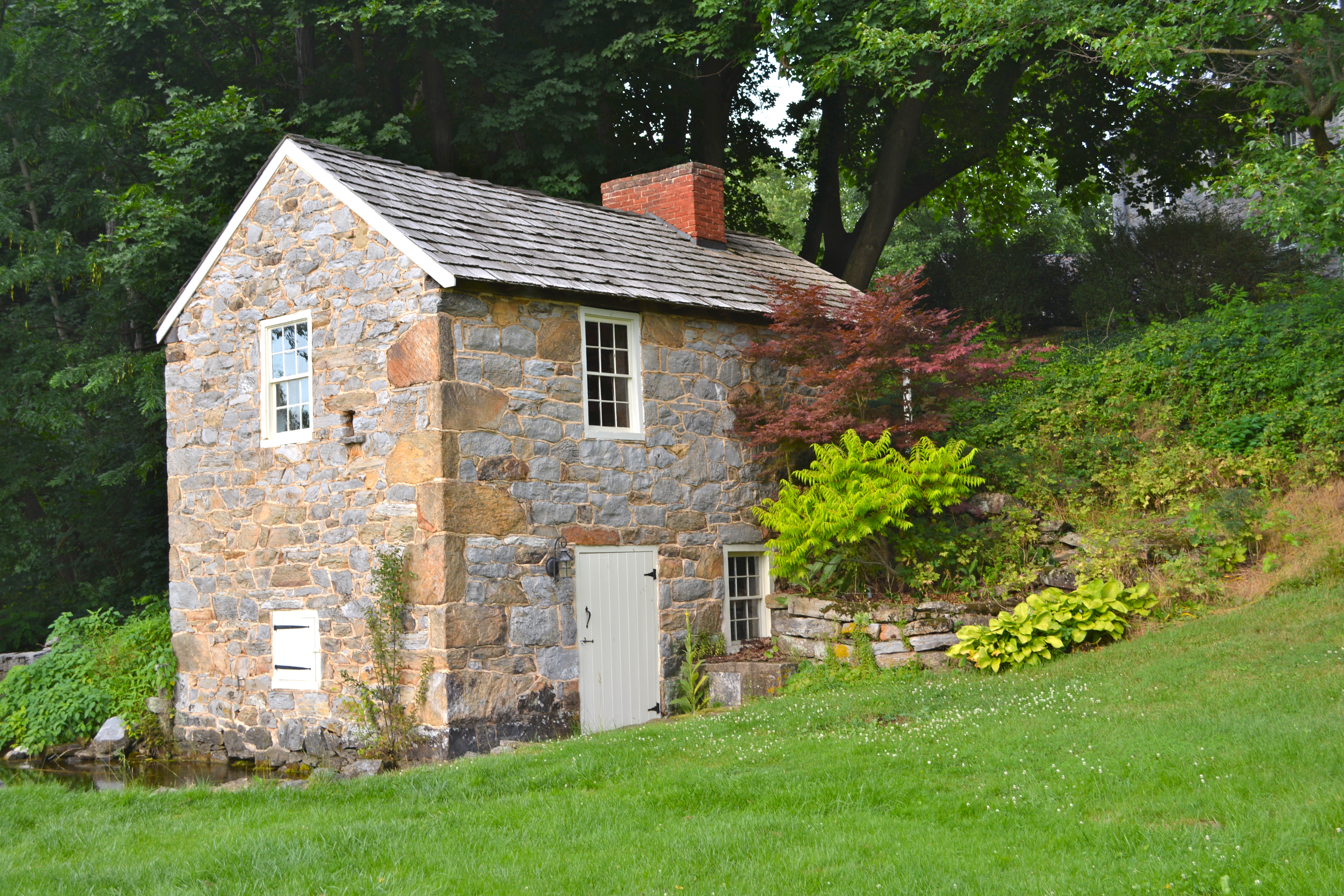
Springhouse

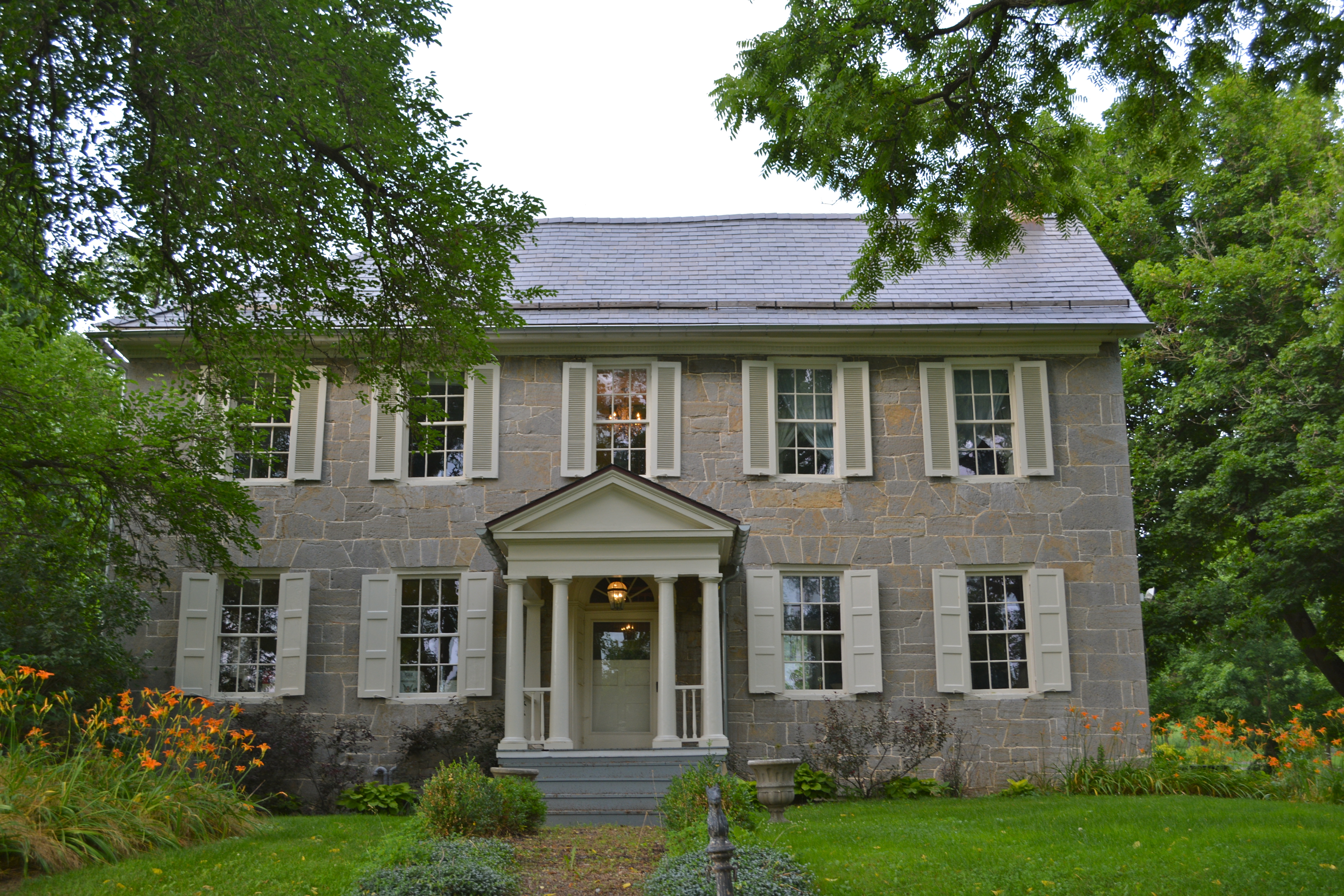
Front

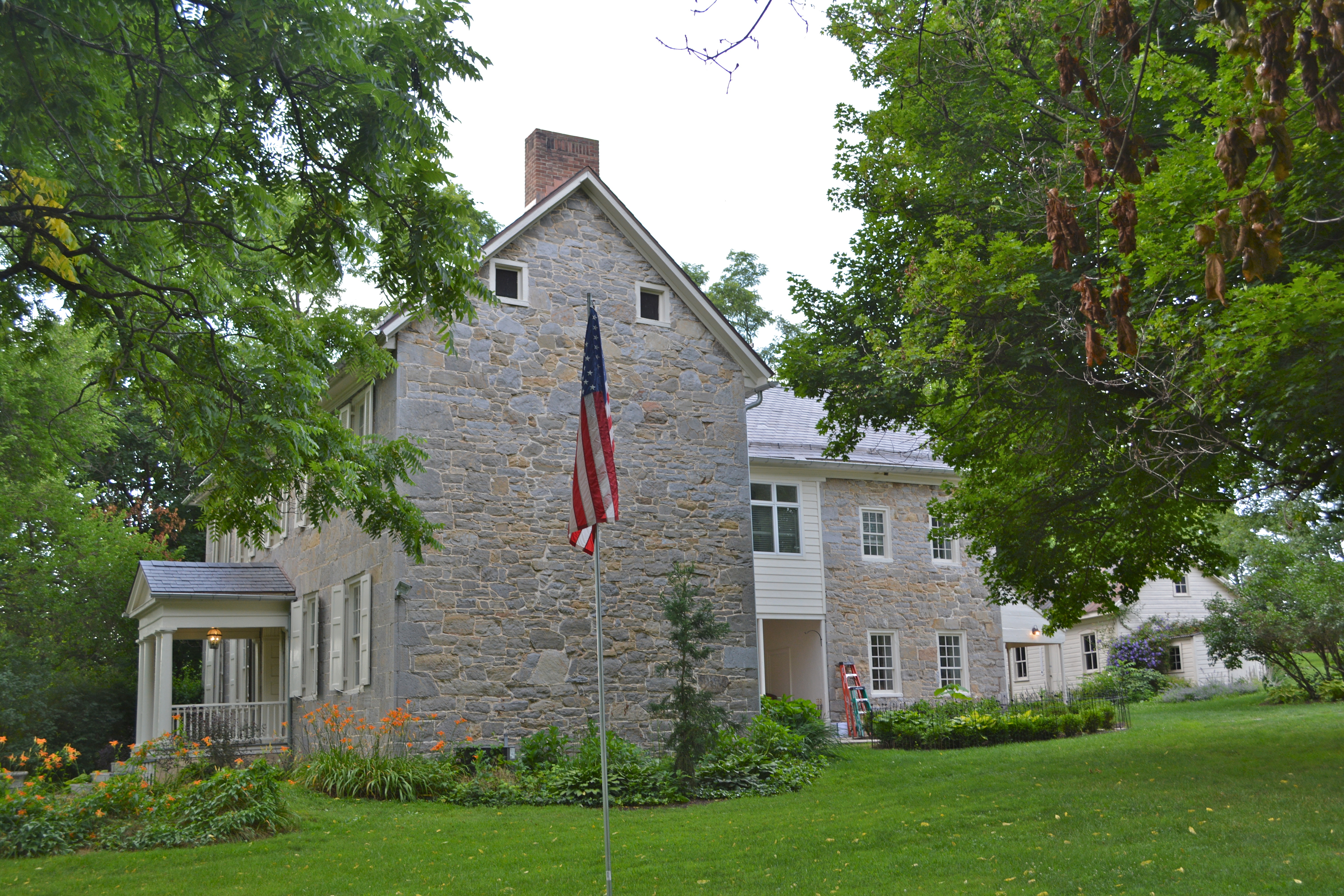
South side

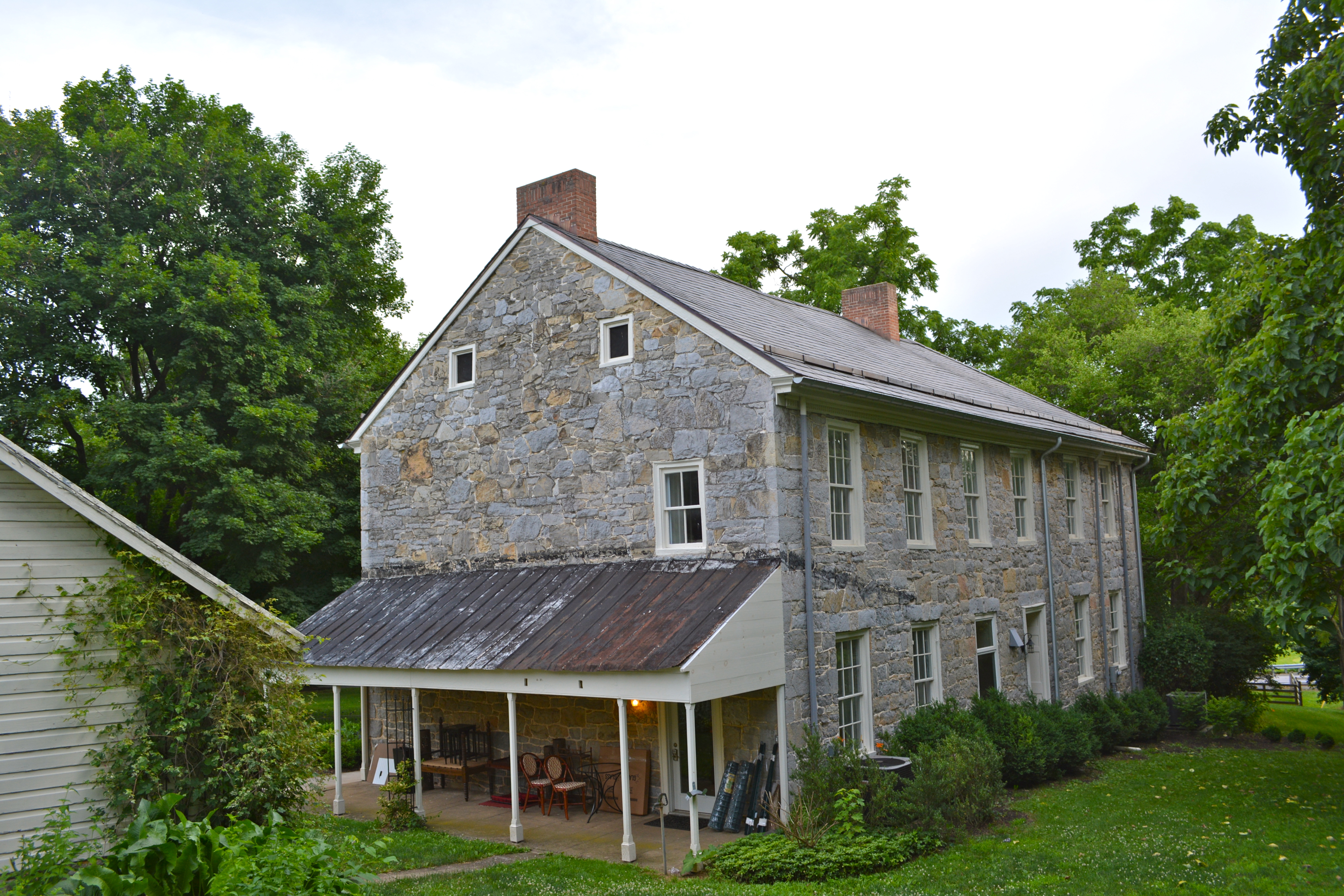
Rear ell from the northeast
