= Guilford Township, Pennsylvania =

Township in Pennsylvania, US

Coordinates: 39°54′00″N 77°37′59″W

Guilford Township, Franklin County, Pennsylvania
- Township
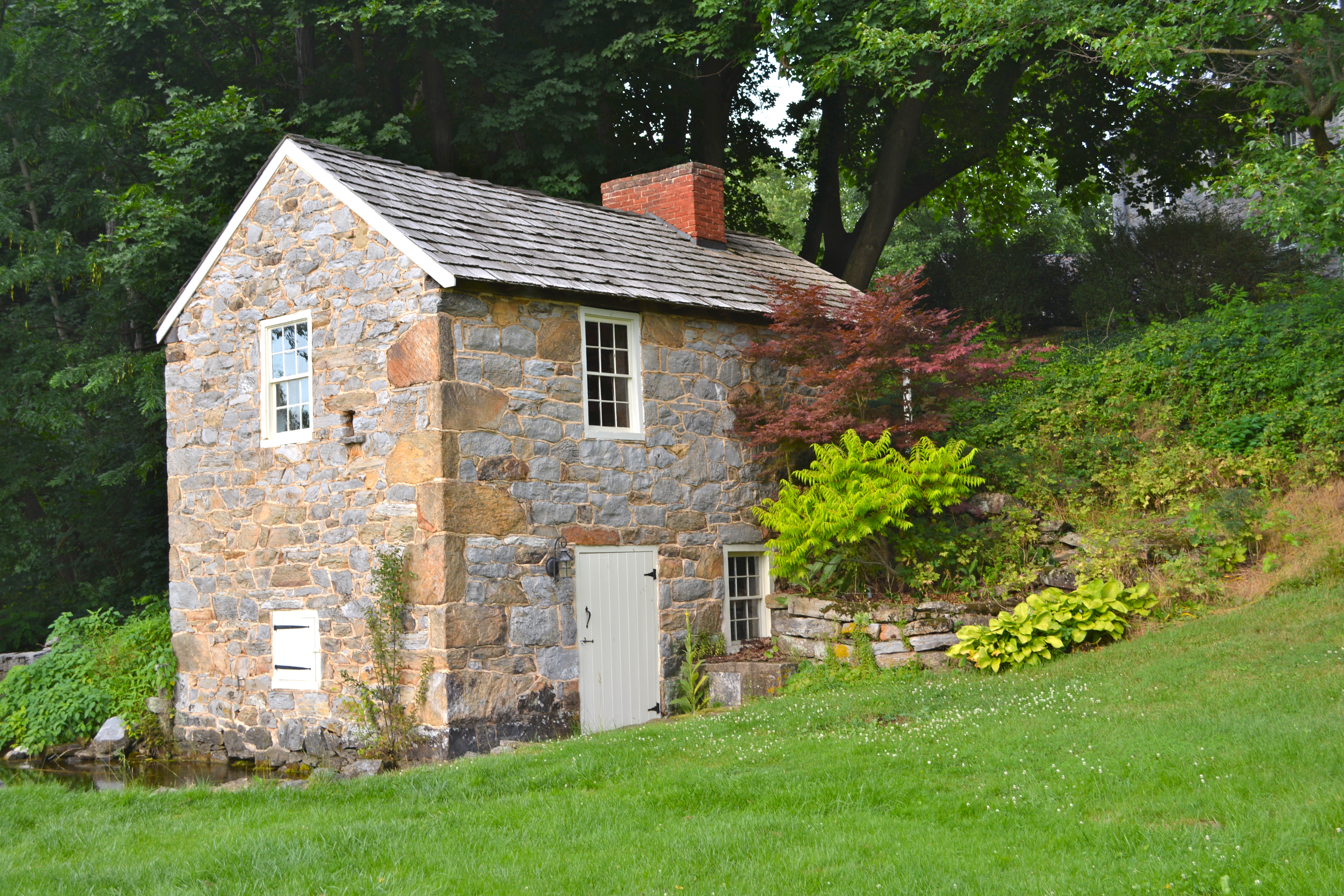
- Springhouse on the Brotherton Farm

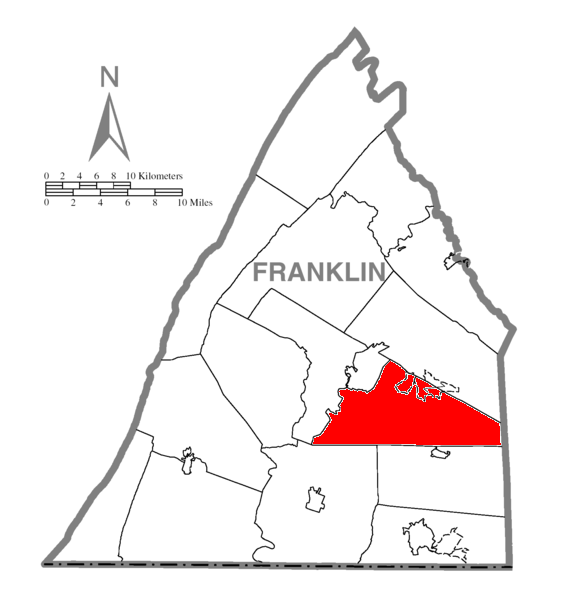
- Map of Franklin County, Pennsylvania highlighting Guilford Township

- Map of Franklin County, Pennsylvania
- Country: United States
- State: Pennsylvania
- County: Franklin
- Settled: 1749
- Incorporated: 1751

Area
  - Total: 51.03 sq mi (132.18 km^{2})
  - Land: 51.02 sq mi (132.13 km^{2})
  - Water: 0.019 sq mi (0.05 km^{2})

Population (2020)
  - Total: 14,627
  - Estimate (2016): 14,793
  - Density: 289.9/sq mi (111.95/km^{2})
- Time zone: UTC-5 (Eastern (EST))
  - Summer (DST): UTC-4 (EDT)
- Area code: 717
- FIPS code: 42-055-31720
- Website: www.guilfordtwp.us

Guilford Township is a township in Franklin County, Pennsylvania, United States. The population was 14,627 at the 2020 census, up from 13,100 at the 2000 census.

== History ==
The Bridge between Guilford and Hamilton Townships, Brotherton Farm, and Gass House are listed on the National Register of Historic Places.

== Geography ==
Guilford Township is in eastern Franklin County, bordered to the east by Adams County and to the northwest by the borough of Chambersburg, the Franklin County seat. Most of the township is in the Great Appalachian Valley, with the eastern portion occupied by several ridges that are part of South Mountain. The unincorporated community of Guilford is in the north, and Fayetteville is to its east, along the border with Greene Township. Marion is in the southwest corner of the township. Other unincorporated communities include Pond Bank in the east at the foot of South Mountain, Falling Spring in the north next to Guilford, Stoufferstown in the northwest between Guilford and Chambersburg, Guilford Springs in the west, and New Franklin west of the center of the township.

Interstate 81 crosses the western part of the township from north to south, with access from Exit 10 (Marion) and Exits 14, 16, and 17 (Chambersburg). U.S. Route 11 runs parallel to the west of I-81, connecting Chambersburg, Guilford Springs, and Marion. U.S. Route 30 crosses the northern part of the township through Fayetteville, Guilford, and Stoufferstown.

According to the United States Census Bureau, the township has a total area of 51.0 square miles (132.2 km^{2}), of which 0.02 square miles (0.05 km^{2}), or 0.03%, is water. The western border of the township is formed by Conococheague Creek, a southward-flowing tributary of the Potomac River. A small area in the eastern part of the township is part of the Antietam Creek watershed, another tributary of the Potomac.

=== Neighboring Townships ===
- Antrim Township (southwest)
- Greene Township (north)
- Hamilton Township (west)
- Hamiltonban Township (Adams County), (east)
- Quincy Township (south)

== Communities ==
- Aqua
- Duffield
- East Fayetteville
- Guilford
- Guilford Siding
- Guilford Springs
- Ledy
- Marion
- New Franklin
- Pond Bank
- Social Island
- Stoufferstown
- West Fayetteville

== Demographics ==
Historical population
Census	Pop.	Note	%±
2000	13,100		—
2010	14,531		10.9%
2020	14,627		0.7%
2016 (est.)	14,793		1.8%
U.S. Decennial Census

As of the census of 2000, there were 13,100 people, 4,944 households, and 3,821 families residing in the township. The population density was 249.2 inhabitants per square mile (96.2/km^{2}). There were 5,130 housing units at an average density of 97.6 per square mile (37.7/km^{2}). The racial makeup of the township was 95.92% White, 1.77% African American, 0.21% Native American, 0.57% Asian, 0.01% Pacific Islander, 0.34% from other races, and 1.18% from two or more races. Hispanic or Latino of any race were 1.25% of the population.

There were 4,944 households, out of which 30.3% had children under the age of 18 living with them, 67.7% were married couples living together, 6.7% had a female householder with no husband present, and 22.7% were non-families. 19.0% of all households were made up of individuals, and 8.5% had someone living alone who was 65 years of age or older. The average household size was 2.53 and the average family size was 2.88.

In the township the population was spread out, with 22.4% under the age of 18, 6.9% from 18 to 24, 26.4% from 25 to 44, 26.2% from 45 to 64, and 18.1% who were 65 years of age or older. The median age was 41 years. For every 100 females, there were 99.5 males. For every 100 females age 18 and over, there were 98.1 males.

The median income for a household in the township was $46,076, and the median income for a family was $51,340. Males had a median income of $36,305 versus $25,471 for females. The per capita income for the township was $20,258. About 4.3% of families and 5.4% of the population were below the poverty line, including 6.7% of those under age 18 and 9.2% of those age 65 or over.
