= Culbertson–Harbison Farm =

Historic house in Pennsylvania, United States

- U.S. National Register of Historic Places
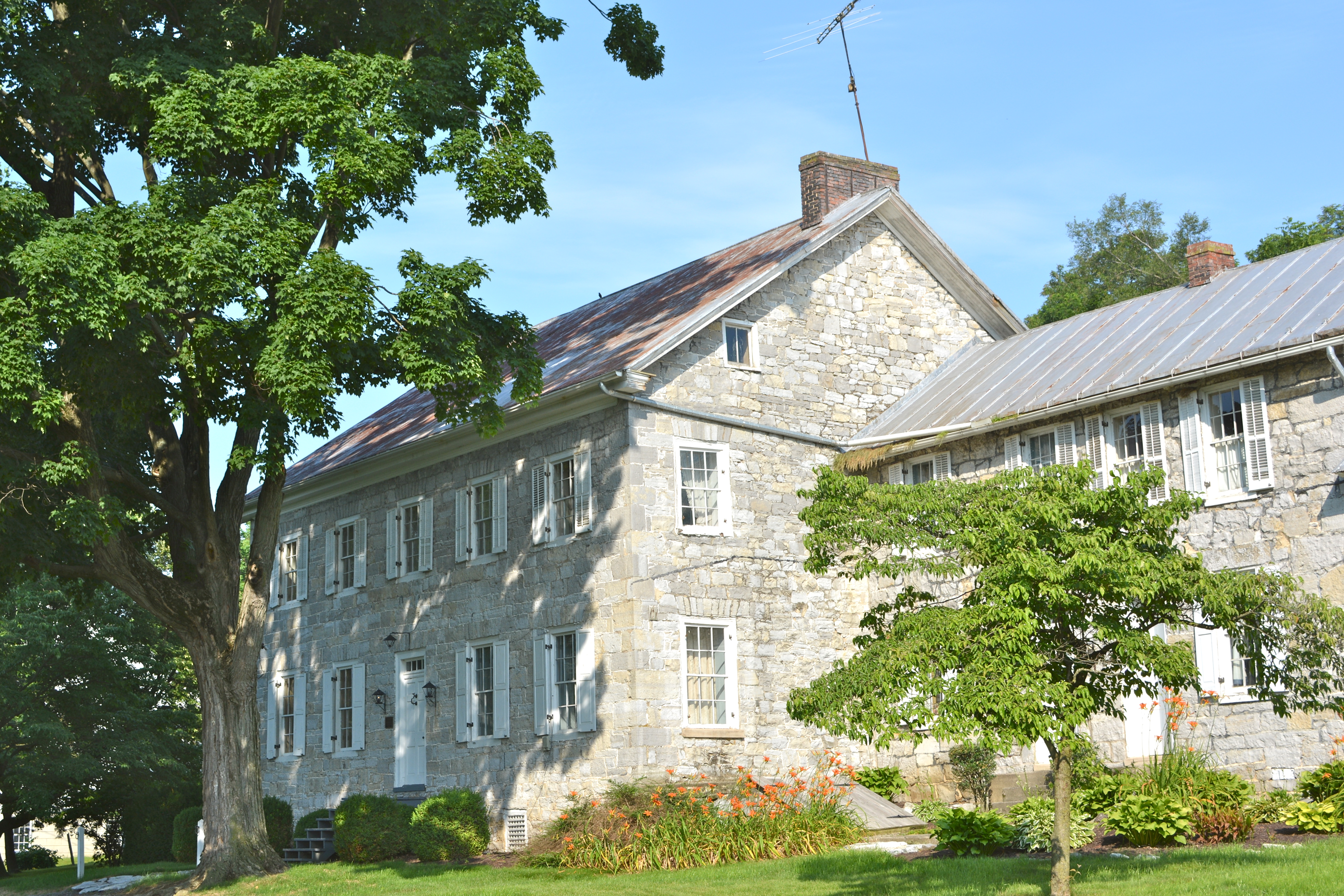
- Main house

- Location within Pennsylvania Location within the United States
- Location: South of Nyesville on Nyesville Road, Greene Township
- Coordinates: 40°1′2″N 77°37′44″W
- Area: 5 acres (2.0 ha)
- Built: 1798-1800
- Architectural style: Federal
- NRHP reference No.: 80003499
- Added to NRHP: June 27, 1980

Culbertson–Harbison Farm is a historic home and farm complex located at Greene Township in Franklin County, Pennsylvania. The house was built between 1798 and 1800, and is a two-story, five-bay, limestone dwelling in the Federal style. It has a two-story, three-bay stone addition built between 1820 and 1840. Attached to the addition is a frame kitchen addition and brick smokehouse. Also on the property are the contributing large frame Pennsylvania bank barn with three hexagonal cupolas, a small frame privy, and other outbuildings.

It was listed on the National Register of Historic Places in 1980.

== Gallery ==
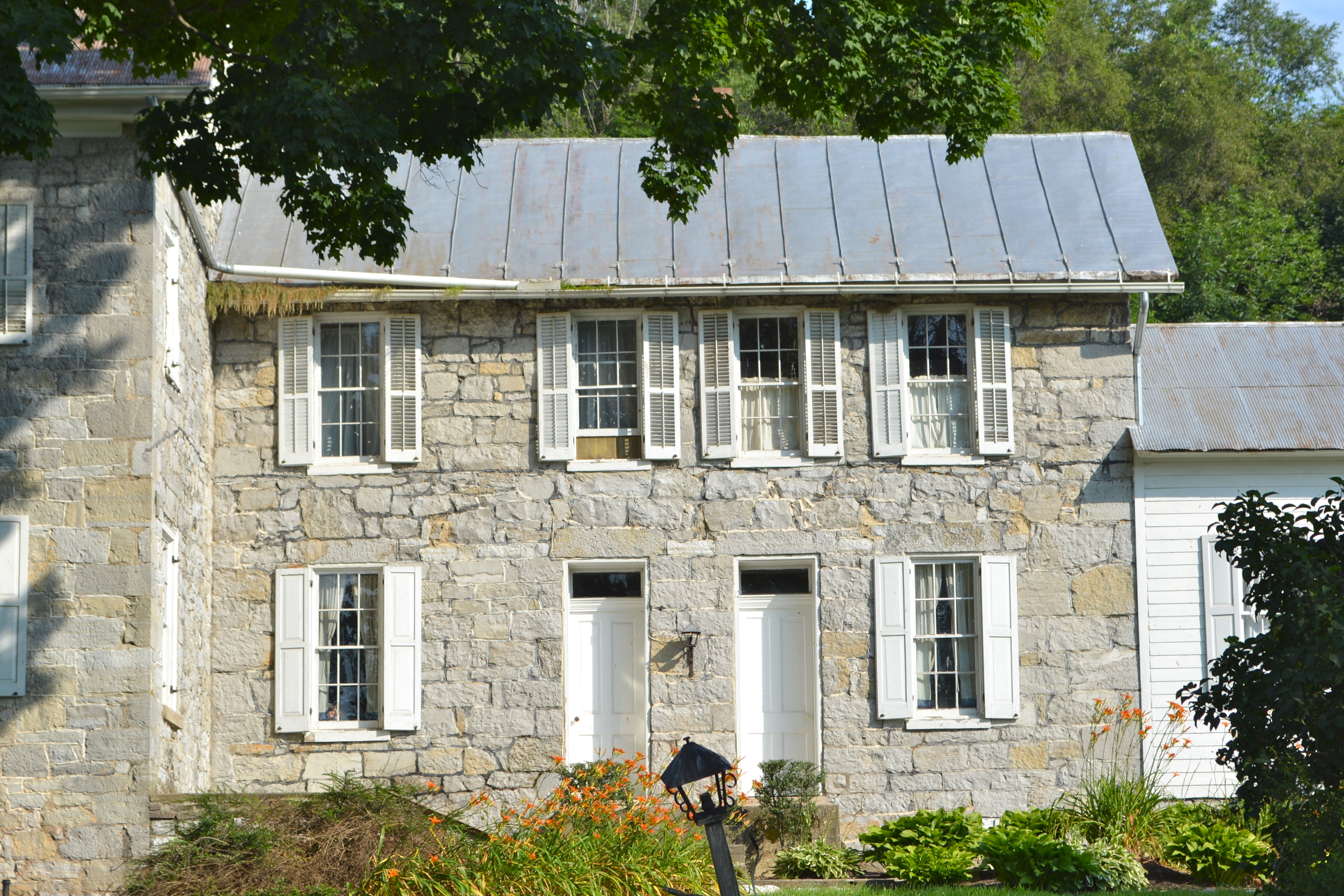
Stone addition

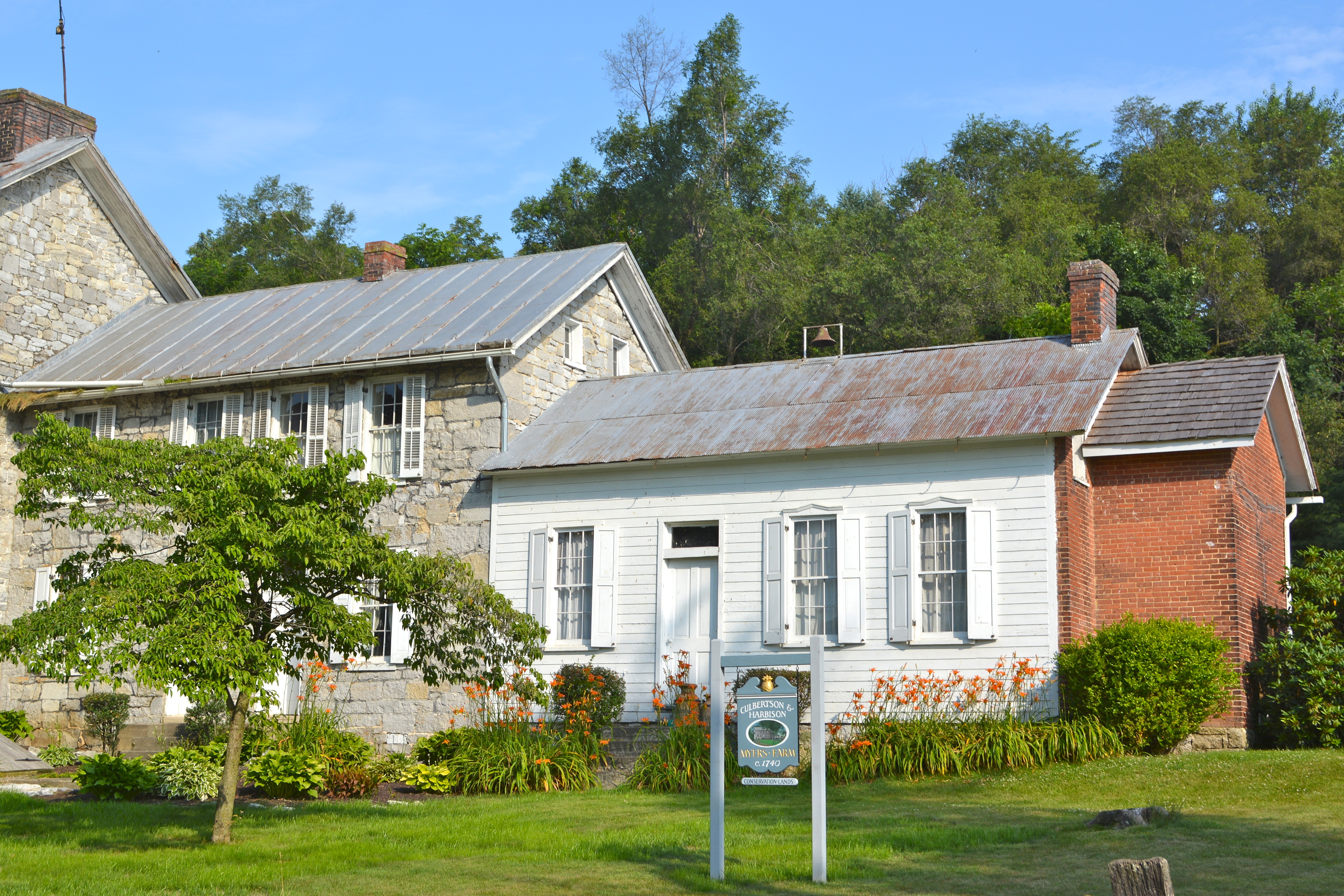
The three additions

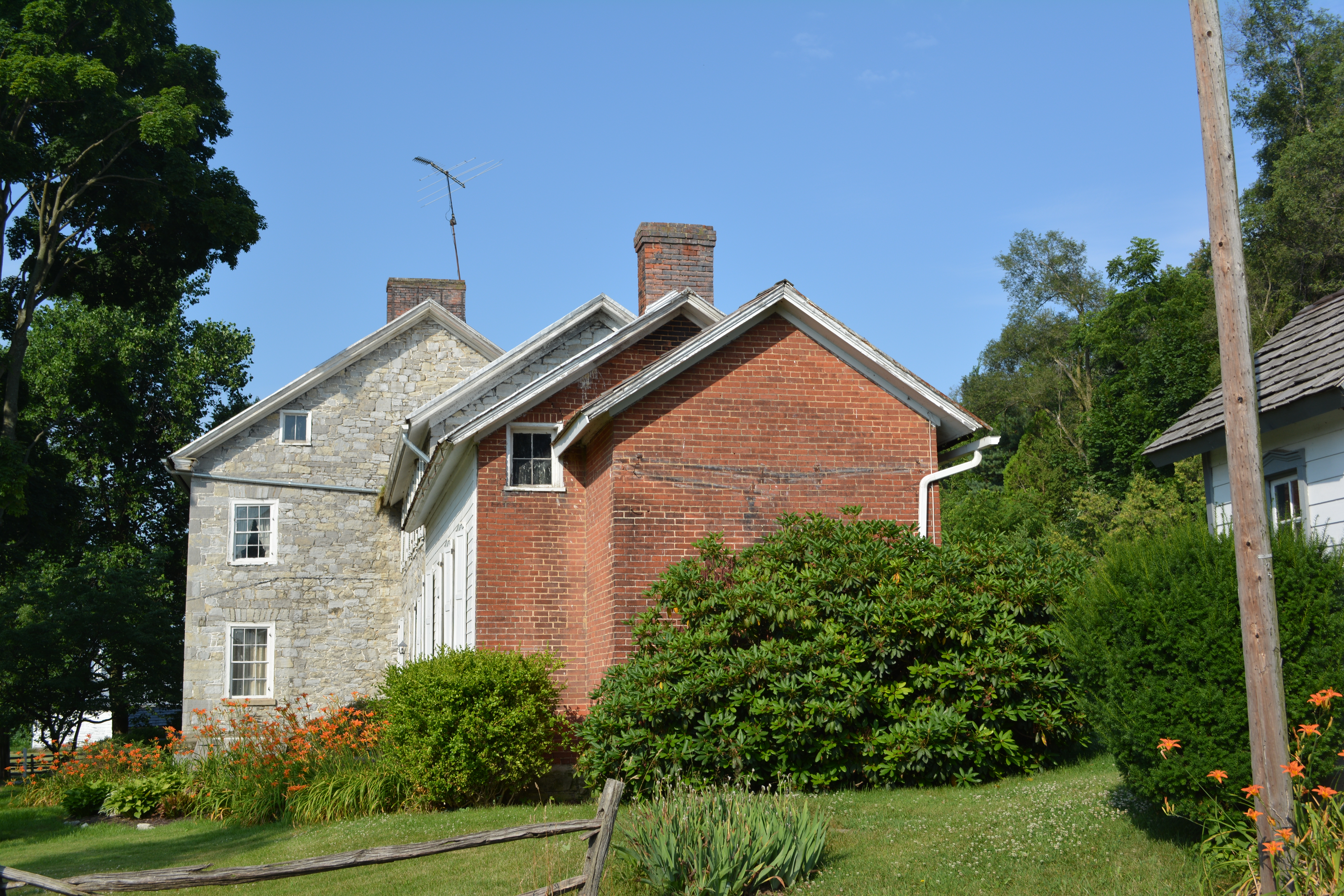
View from the road

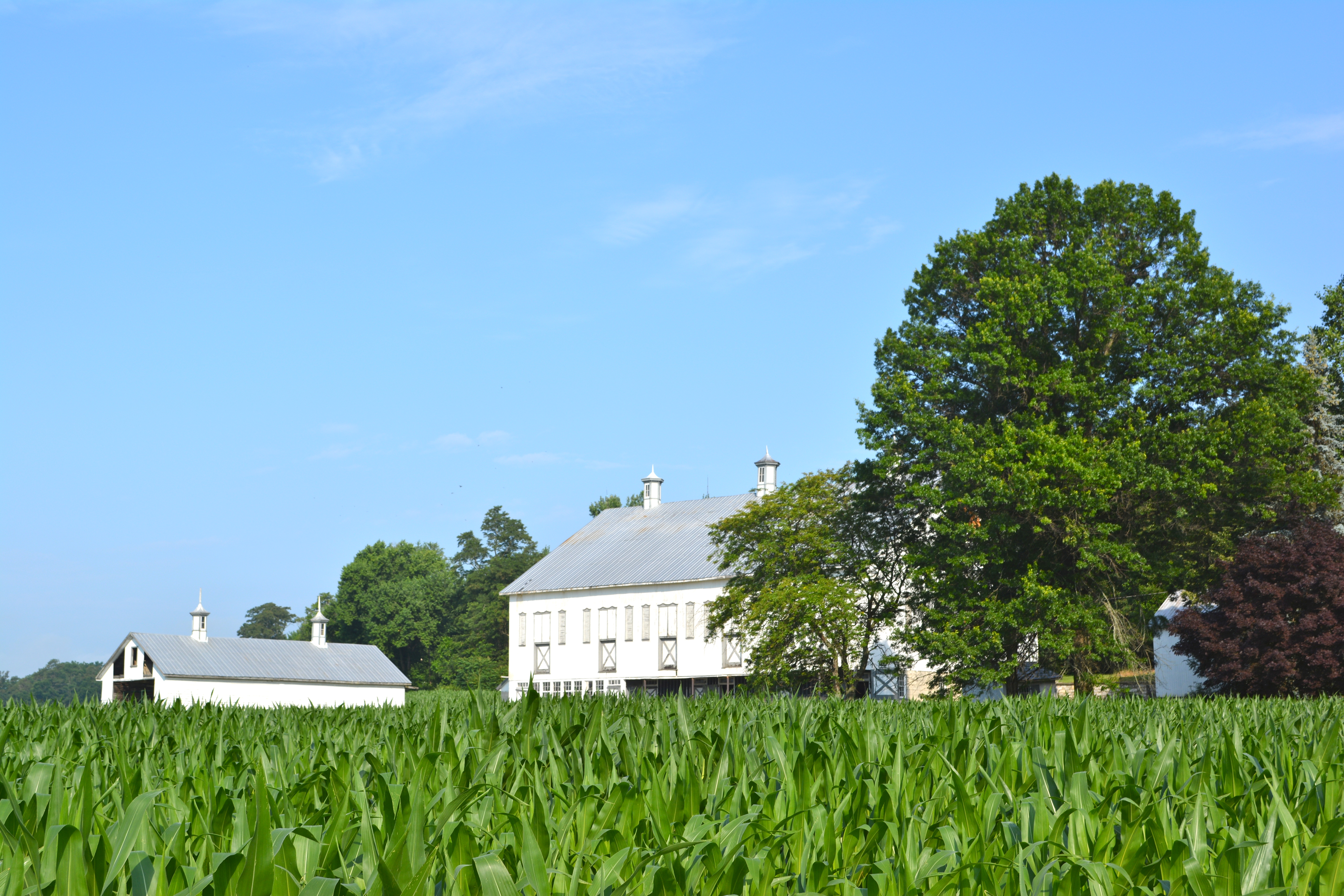
Barns and fields
