= Bridge between Guilford and Hamilton Townships =

- U.S. National Register of Historic Places
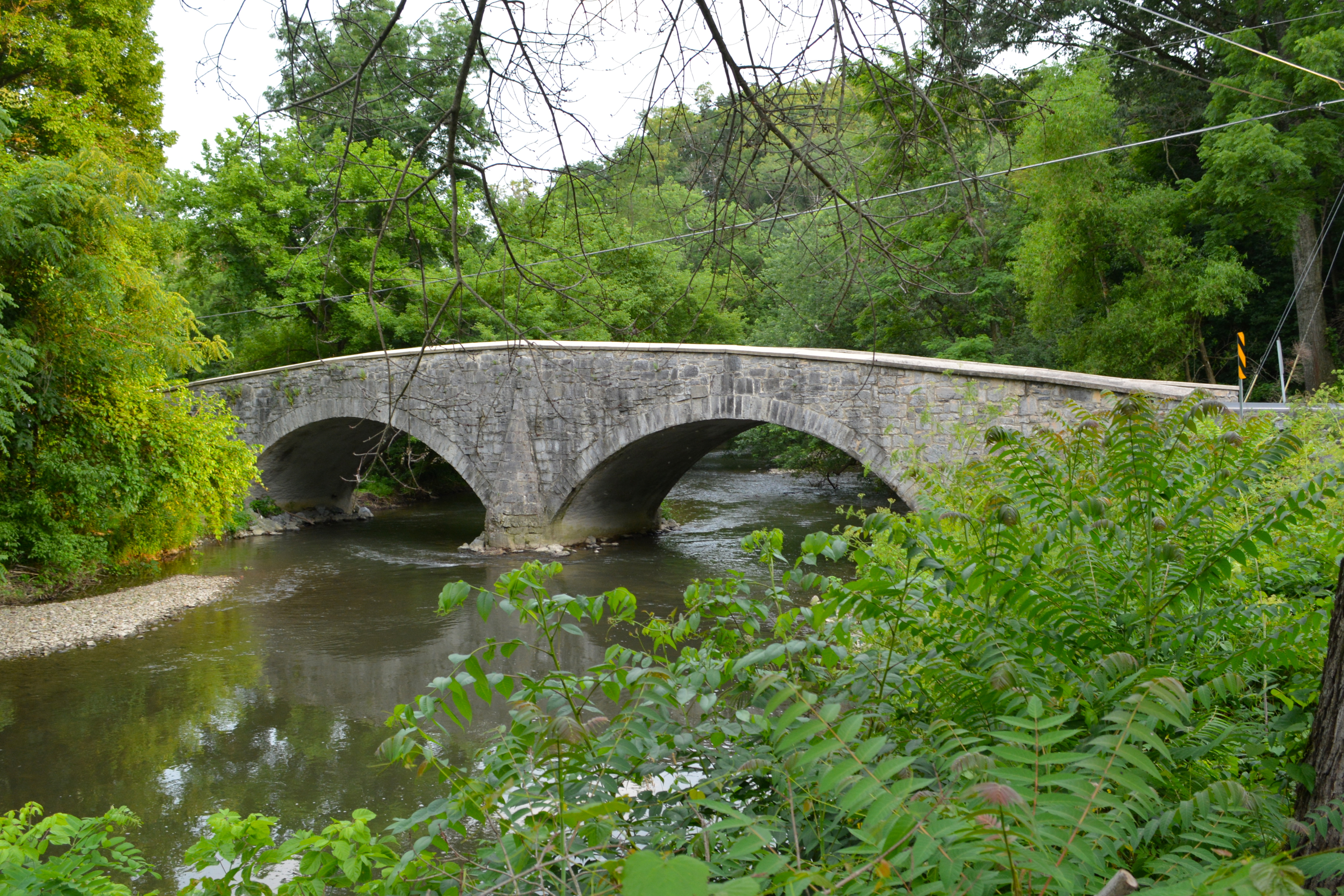

- Location within Pennsylvania Location within the United States
- Location: Legislative Route 28033 over Conococheague Creek near Social Island, Guilford Township and Hamilton Township, Pennsylvania
- Coordinates: 39°53′9″N 77°42′48″W
- Area: less than one acre
- Architectural style: Multi-span stone arch
- MPS: Highway Bridges Owned by the Commonwealth of Pennsylvania, Department of Transportation TR
- NRHP reference No.: 88000776
- Added to NRHP: June 22, 1988

Bridge between Guilford and Hamilton Townships is a historic multi-span stone arch bridge located at Guilford Township and Hamilton Township in Franklin County, Pennsylvania. It is a 100-foot-long (30 m), bridge with two spans each measuring 36-foot-long (11 m). It was constructed before 1860. It crosses Conococheague Creek.

It was listed on the National Register of Historic Places in 1982.
