= Guilford, Pennsylvania =

Unincorporated community in Pennsylvania, US

- Census-designated place
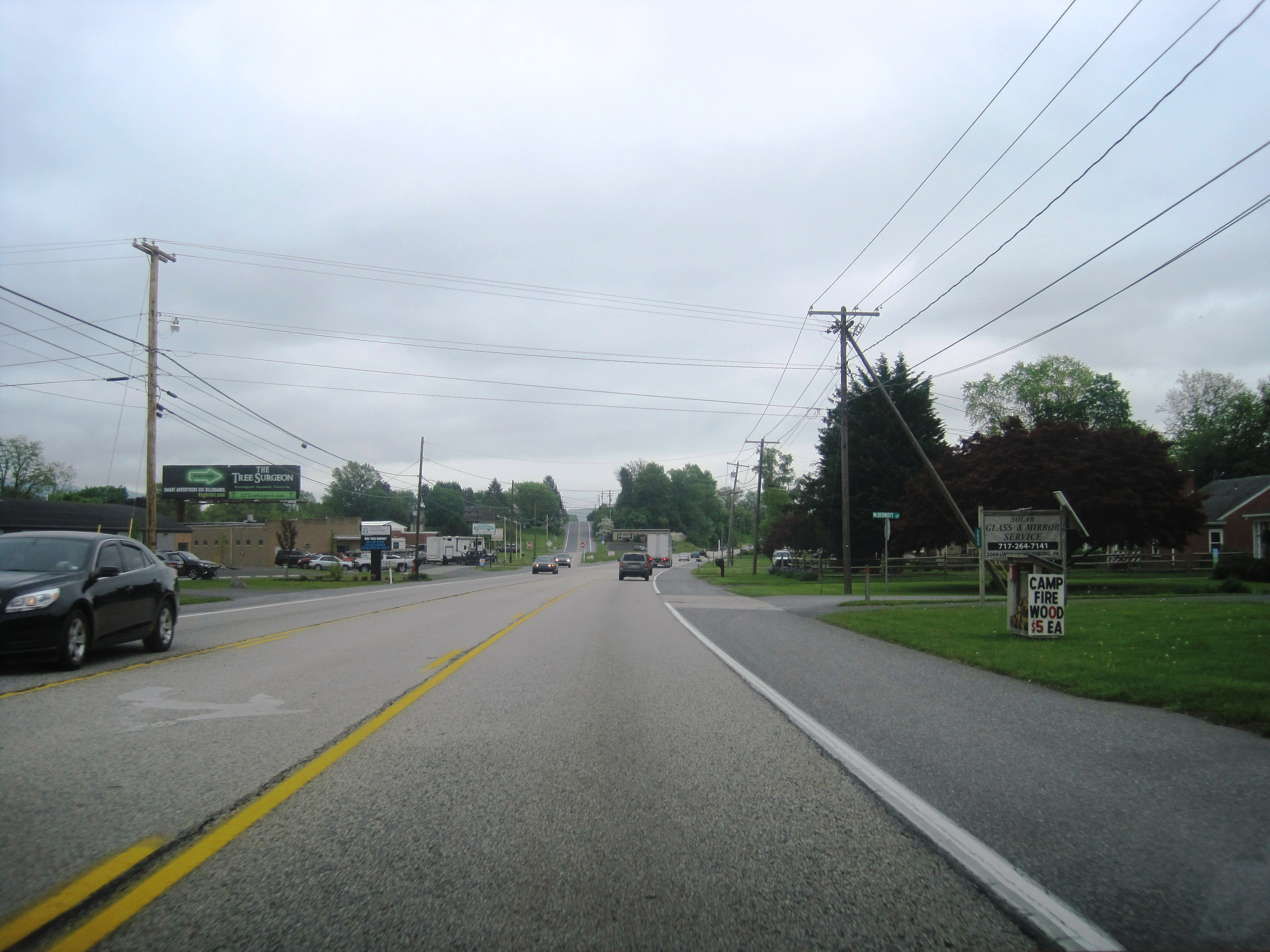
- US Route 30 intersects McDermott St. in Guilford.

- Location within the U.S. state of Pennsylvania Guilford (the United States)
- Coordinates: 39°55′02″N 77°35′58″W
- Country: United States
- State: Pennsylvania
- County: Franklin
- Townships: Guilford, Greene

Area
  - Total: 1.55 sq mi (4.01 km^{2})
  - Land: 1.55 sq mi (4.01 km^{2})
  - Water: 0 sq mi (0.00 km^{2})
- Elevation: 774 ft (236 m)

Population (2020)
  - Total: 2,923
  - Density: 1,886.7/sq mi (728.45/km^{2})
- Time zone: UTC-5 (Eastern (EST))
  - Summer (DST): UTC-4 (EDT)
- ZIP code: 17202
- Area code: 717
- FIPS code: 42-31716
- GNIS feature ID: 2389887

Guilford is a census-designated place (CDP) in Franklin County, Pennsylvania, United States. The population was 2,923 at the 2020 census.

== Geography ==
Guilford is located in eastern Franklin County primarily in Guilford Township, but a portion extends north into Greene Township. The area is also known as Guilford Hills.

U.S. Route 30 passes through the community, leading east 2 miles (3 km) to Fayetteville and west 4 miles (6 km) to Chambersburg, the county seat.

According to the United States Census Bureau, the CDP has a total area of 1.3 square miles (3.4 km^{2}), all land.

== Demographics ==
Historical population
Census	Pop.	Note	%±
2020	2,923		—
U.S. Decennial Census

As of the census of 2000, there were 1,835 people, 731 households, and 595 families residing in the CDP. The population density was 1,467.0 inhabitants per square mile (566.4/km^{2}). There were 751 housing units at an average density of 600.4 per square mile (231.8/km^{2}). The racial makeup of the CDP was 95.42% White, 1.80% African American, 1.09% Asian, 0.05% Pacific Islander, 0.22% from other races, and 1.42% from two or more races. Hispanic or Latino of any race were 0.87% of the population.

There were 731 households, out of which 29.3% had children under the age of 18 living with them, 74.8% were married couples living together, 5.2% had a female householder with no husband present, and 18.5% were non-families. 16.0% of all households were made up of individuals, and 9.7% had someone living alone who was 65 years of age or older. The average household size was 2.51 and the average family size was 2.79.

In the CDP, the population was spread out, with 21.9% under the age of 18, 4.4% from 18 to 24, 21.9% from 25 to 44, 31.3% from 45 to 64, and 20.4% who were 65 years of age or older. The median age was 46 years. For every 100 females, there were 96.3 males. For every 100 females age 18 and over, there were 91.8 males.

The median income for a household in the CDP was $60,594, and the median income for a family was $62,978. Males had a median income of $44,583 versus $32,132 for females. The per capita income for the CDP was $28,723. None of the families and 2.0% of the population were living below the poverty line, including no under eighteens and 7.3% of those over 64.
