= Hamilton Township, Franklin County, Pennsylvania =

Township in Pennsylvania, US

Coordinates: 39°52′00″N 77°43′59″W

- Township
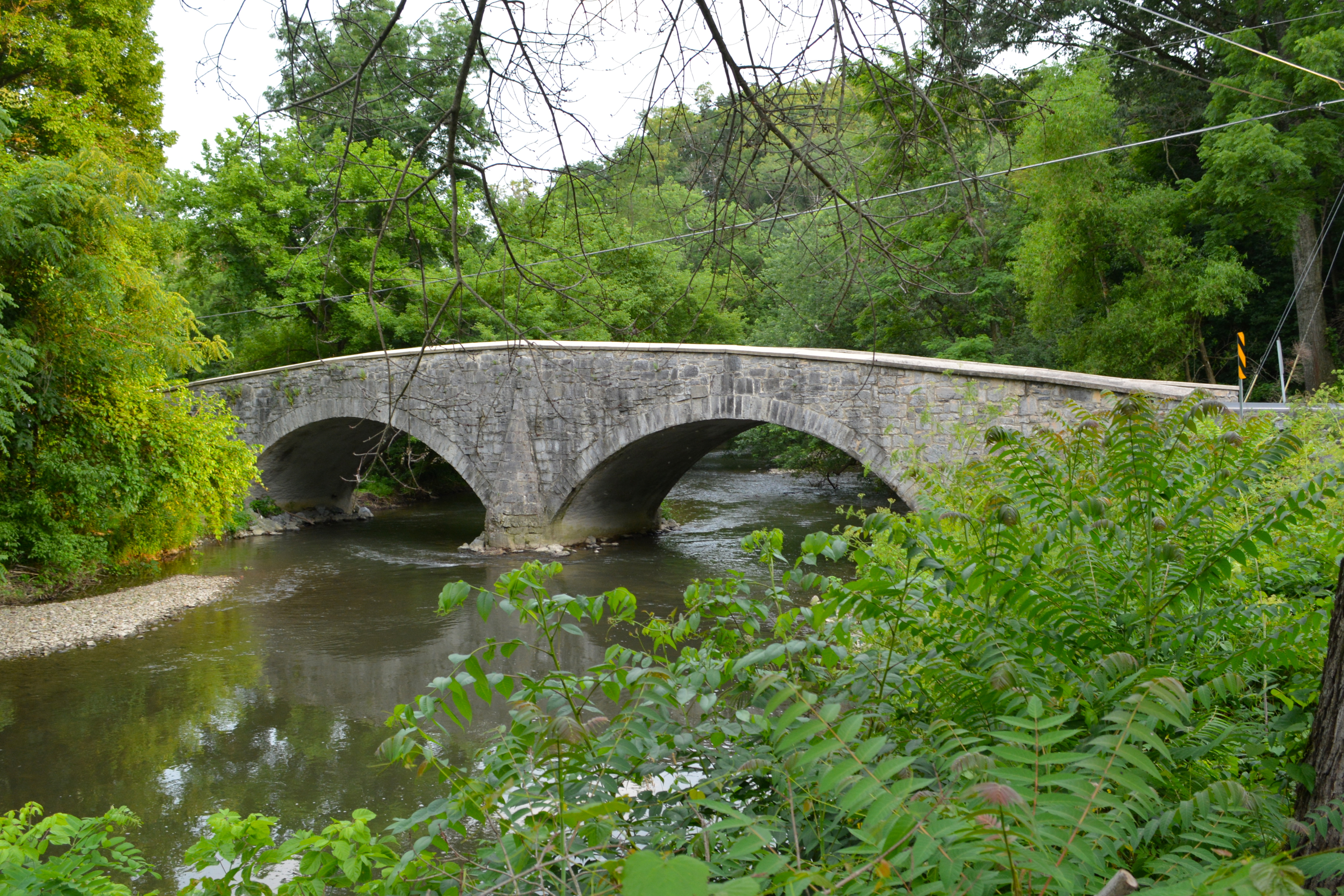
- Pre-Civil War Bridge between Guilford and Hamilton Townships

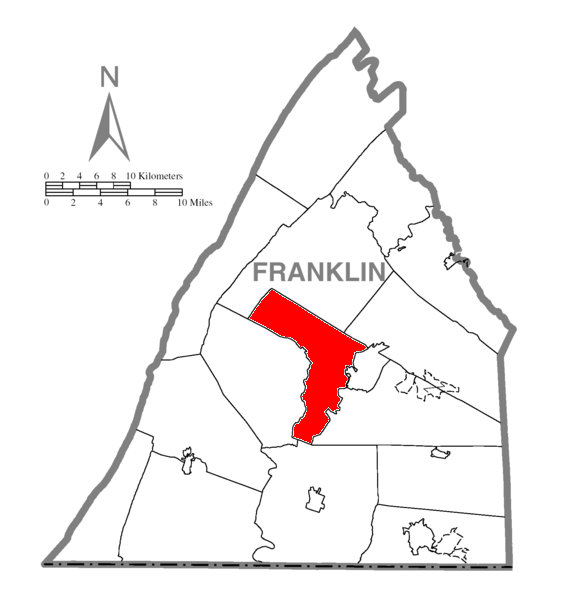
- Map of Franklin County, Pennsylvania highlighting Hamilton Township

- Map of Franklin County, Pennsylvania
- Country: United States
- State: Pennsylvania
- County: Franklin
- Settled: 1737
- Incorporated: 1752

Area
  - Total: 35.54 sq mi (92.05 km^{2})
  - Land: 35.54 sq mi (92.05 km^{2})
  - Water: 0 sq mi (0.00 km^{2})

Population (2020)
  - Total: 11,374
  - Estimate (2016): 11,155
  - Density: 313.9/sq mi (121.19/km^{2})
- Time zone: UTC-5 (Eastern (EST))
  - Summer (DST): UTC-4 (EDT)
- Area code: 717
- FIPS code: 42-055-32152
- Website: https://twphamiltonfranklinpa.org/

Hamilton Township is a township in Franklin County, Pennsylvania, United States. The population was 11,374 at the 2020 census, up from 8,949 at the 2000 census.

== History ==
The township has the name of James Hamilton (1710–1783), mayor of Philadelphia and lieutenant-governor of Pennsylvania.

The Bridge between Guilford and Hamilton Townships was listed on the National Register of Historic Places in 1988.

== Geography ==
Hamilton Township is in central Franklin County and is bordered to the northeast by the borough of Chambersburg, the county seat. South of Chambersburg, Conococheague Creek forms the eastern boundary of the township. Back Creek, a tributary of Conococheague, forms the southwestern boundary. The township extends northwest as far as the crest of Broad Mountain, the easternmost ridge in the Ridge-and-Valley Appalachians in this part of the state.

U.S. Route 30 crosses the center of the township, leading east into Chambersburg and west to McConnellsburg.

According to the United States Census Bureau, the township has a total area of 35.5 square miles (92.0 km^{2}), all land.

=== Neighboring Townships ===
- Antrim Township (south)
- Greene Township (northeast)
- Guilford Township (southeast)
- Letterkenny Township (north)
- St. Thomas Township (west)

== Communities ==
- Cashtown
- Freys
- Hamilton Heights
- Housum
- Kensington Heights
- Pleasant View
- Sandy Hook
- Turkeyfoot

== Demographics ==
Historical population
Census	Pop.	Note	%±
2000	8,949		—
2010	10,788		20.5%
2020	11,374		5.4%
2016 (est.)	11,155		3.4%
U.S. Decennial Census

As of the census of 2000, there were 8,949 people, 3,476 households, and 2,648 families residing in the township. The population density was 250.8 inhabitants per square mile (96.8/km^{2}). There were 3,612 housing units at an average density of 101.2 per square mile (39.1/km^{2}). The racial makeup of the township was 94.97% White, 2.57% African American, 0.11% Native American, 0.74% Asian, 0.08% Pacific Islander, 0.50% from other races, and 1.03% from two or more races. Hispanic or Latino of any race were 1.42% of the population.

There were 3,476 households, out of which 33.9% had children under the age of 18 living with them, 63.8% were married couples living together, 8.9% had a female householder with no husband present, and 23.8% were non-families. 18.9% of all households were made up of individuals, and 7.5% had someone living alone who was 65 years of age or older. The average household size was 2.57 and the average family size was 2.93.

In the township the population was spread out, with 25.3% under the age of 18, 7.6% from 18 to 24, 29.0% from 25 to 44, 24.3% from 45 to 64, and 13.7% who were 65 years of age or older. The median age was 37 years. For every 100 females there were 95.1 males. For every 100 females age 18 and over, there were 93.3 males.

The median income for a household in the township was $43,153, and the median income for a family was $47,049. Males had a median income of $32,879 versus $25,082 for females. The per capita income for the township was $21,122. About 4.9% of families and 6.3% of the population were below the poverty line, including 9.3% of those under age 18 and 4.9% of those age 65 or over.
