= Stoufferstown, Pennsylvania =

Unincorporated community in Pennsylvania, US

Coordinates: 39°55′40″N 77°37′50″W

Stoufferstown is an unincorporated community in Franklin County, in the U.S. state of Pennsylvania.

== History ==
Stoufferstown got its start in the 1790s when Abraham Stouffer (son of Jacob and Magdelen (Hess) Stouffer) built a mill at the site.
