= Marion, Pennsylvania =

Unincorporated community in Pennsylvania, US

- Census-designated place
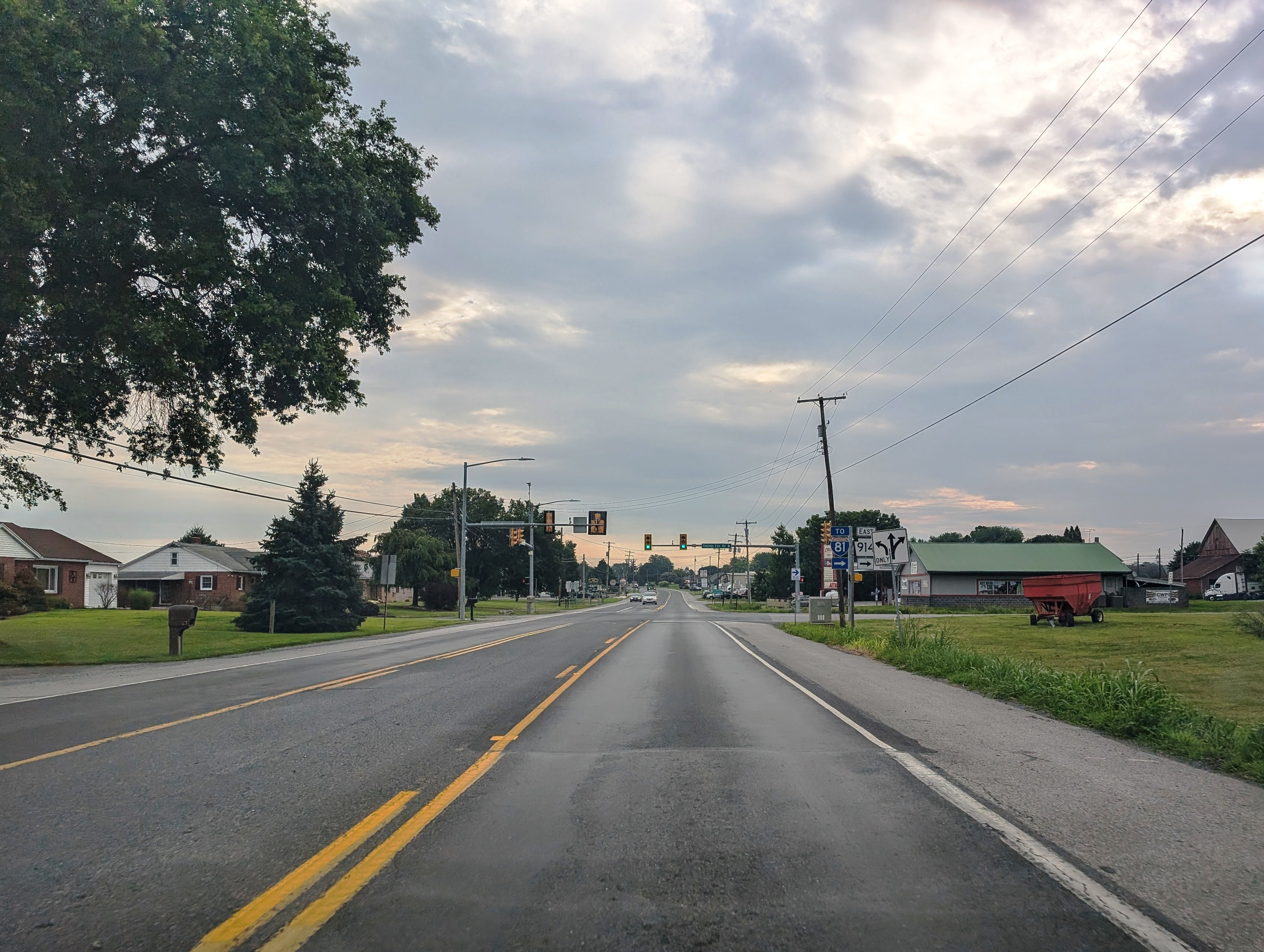
- US 11 northbound through Marion

- Location of Marion in Pennsylvania Marion (the United States)
- Coordinates: 39°51′38″N 77°42′06″W
- Country: United States
- State: Pennsylvania
- County: Franklin
- Township: Guilford

Area
  - Total: 1.99 sq mi (5.15 km^{2})
  - Land: 1.99 sq mi (5.15 km^{2})
  - Water: 0 sq mi (0.00 km^{2})
- Elevation: 600 ft (180 m)

Population (2020)
  - Total: 851
  - Density: 427.7/sq mi (165.14/km^{2})
- Time zone: UTC-5 (Eastern (EST))
  - Summer (DST): UTC-4 (EDT)
- ZIP code: 17235
- Area code: 717
- FIPS code: 42-47464
- GNIS feature ID: 2633812

Marion is an unincorporated community and census-designated place (CDP) in Franklin County, Pennsylvania, United States. As of the 2020 census, the population was 851.

It lies along U.S. Route 11, 6 miles (10 km) south of Chambersburg and 5 miles (8 km) north of Greencastle, in the southwest corner of Guilford Township. Interstate 81 passes along the eastern edge of the community, with access from Exit 10 (Pennsylvania Route 914). I-81 leads northeastward 37 miles (60 km) to Carlisle and south 17 miles (27 km) to Hagerstown, Maryland.

Marion was originally called Independence, and under the latter name was laid out circa 1810. A post office called Marion has been in operation since 1833. The present name is after Francis Marion, army officer during the American Revolutionary War, known as the Swamp Fox.

== Demographics ==
Historical population
Census	Pop.	Note	%±
2020	851		—
U.S. Decennial Census
