= Smoketown, Franklin County, Pennsylvania =

Unincorporated community in Pennsylvania, U.S.

Coordinates: 39°56′56″N 77°34′32″W

Smoketown is an unincorporated community in Franklin County, in the U.S. state of Pennsylvania.

== History ==
A variant name was "Smoke Town". In 1878, Smoketown had about 75 inhabitants.
