= James Finley House (Chambersburg, Pennsylvania) =

Historic house in Pennsylvania, United States

- U.S. National Register of Historic Places
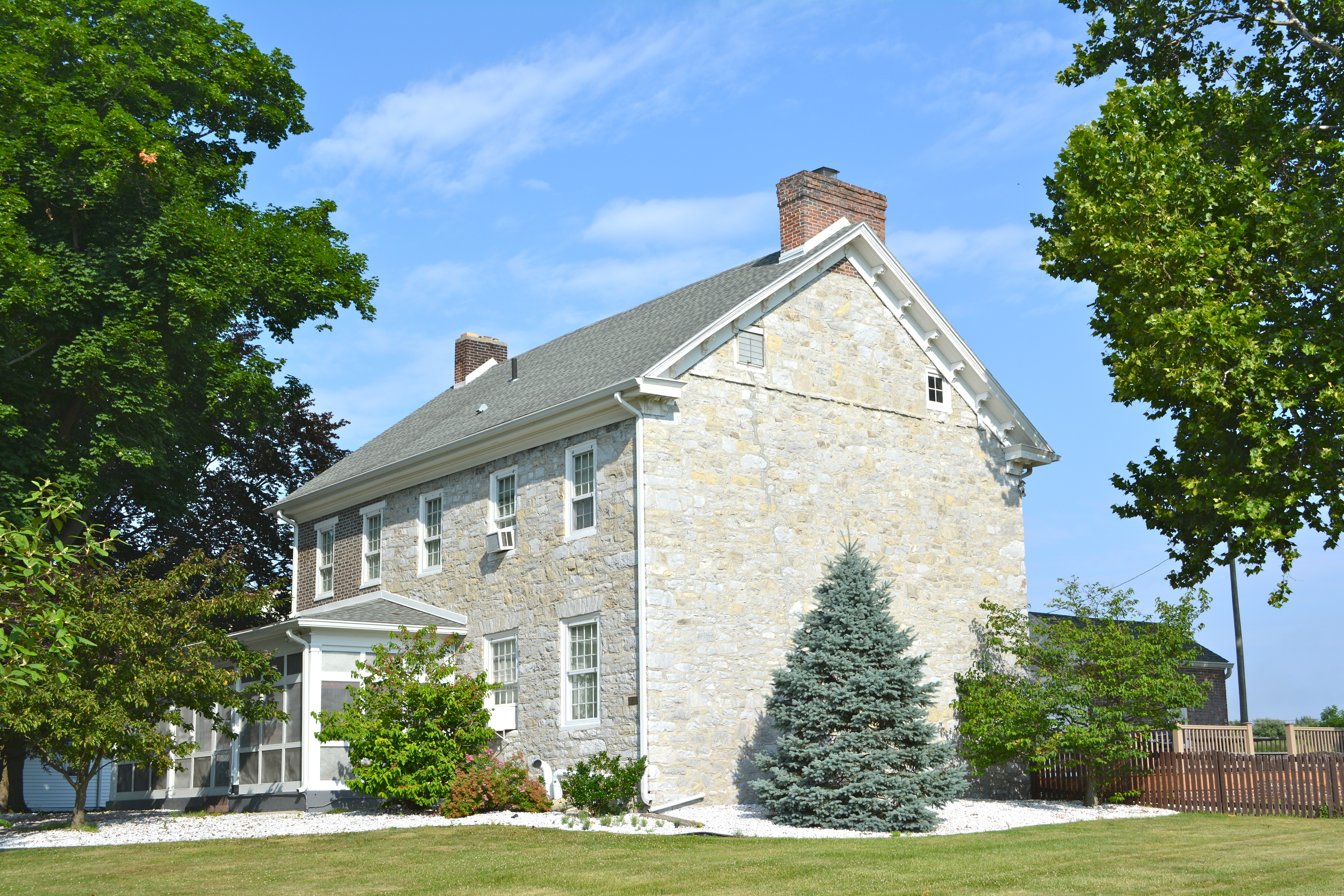

- Location within Pennsylvania Location within the United States
- Location: Building No. 505, Letterkenny Army Depot, Greene Township, Pennsylvania
- Coordinates: 39°59′56″N 77°38′19″W
- Area: less than one acre
- Built: 1778
- NRHP reference No.: 74001783
- Added to NRHP: November 19, 1974

The James Finley House, also known as the Commanding Officer's Residence, is an historic home that is located at the Letterkenny Army Depot in Greene Township in Franklin County, Pennsylvania, United States.

It was listed on the National Register of Historic Places in 1974.

== History and architectural features ==
Built circa 1778, and is a 2 1/2-story, limestone farmhouse. It is five bays wide and has a medium pitched gable roof. The house was obtained in 1942 for use as the commanding officer's residence, and is one of the oldest surviving dwellings in Franklin County.

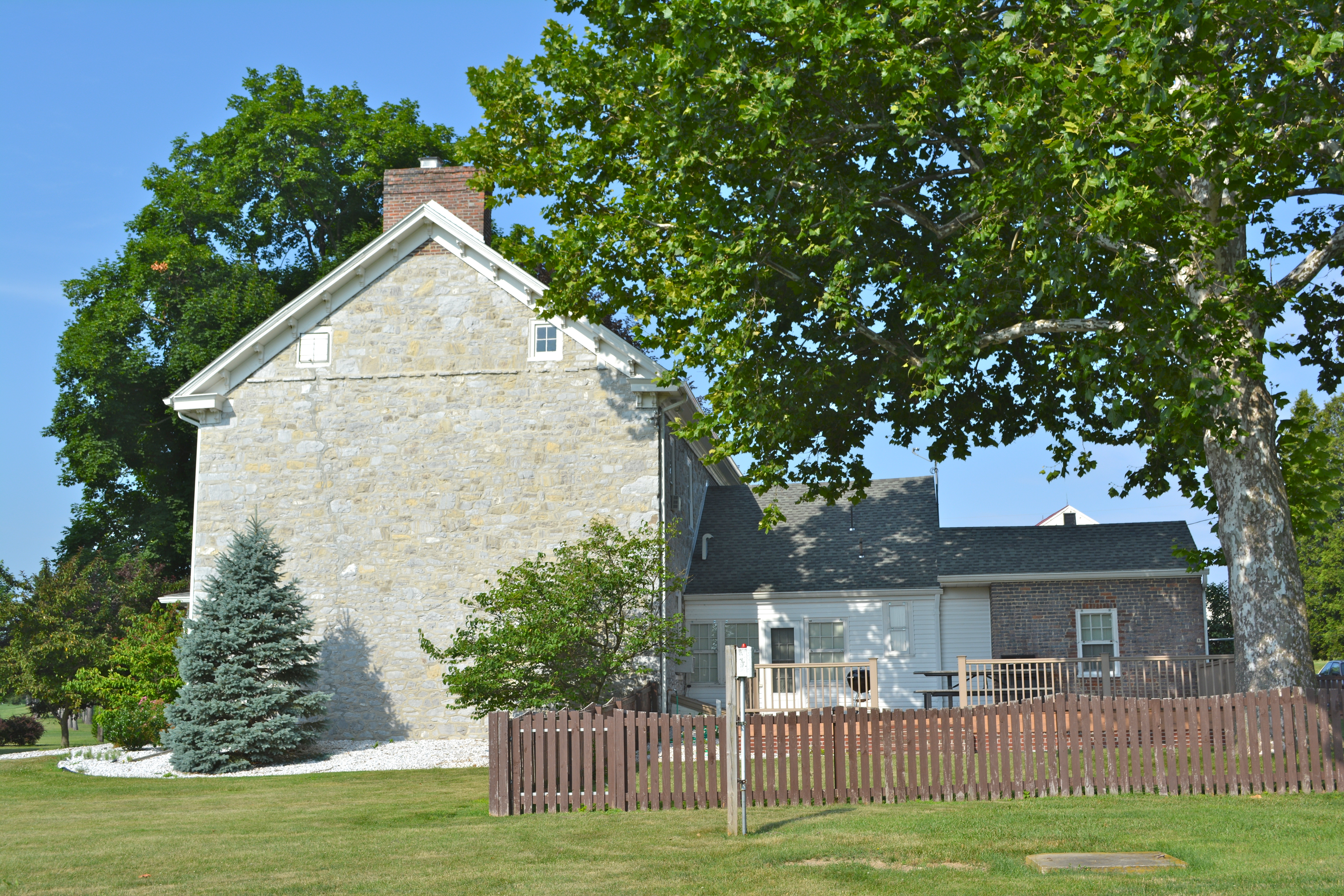
View from the north
