= New Franklin, Pennsylvania =

Unincorporated community in Pennsylvania, U.S.

Coordinates: 39°52′51″N 77°38′09″W

New Franklin is an unincorporated community in Franklin County, in the U.S. state of Pennsylvania.

== History ==
The first settlement at New Franklin was made in 1795. A post office called New Franklin was established in 1882, and remained in operation until 1907.
