= Dodge County, Nebraska =

County in Nebraska, United States

- County
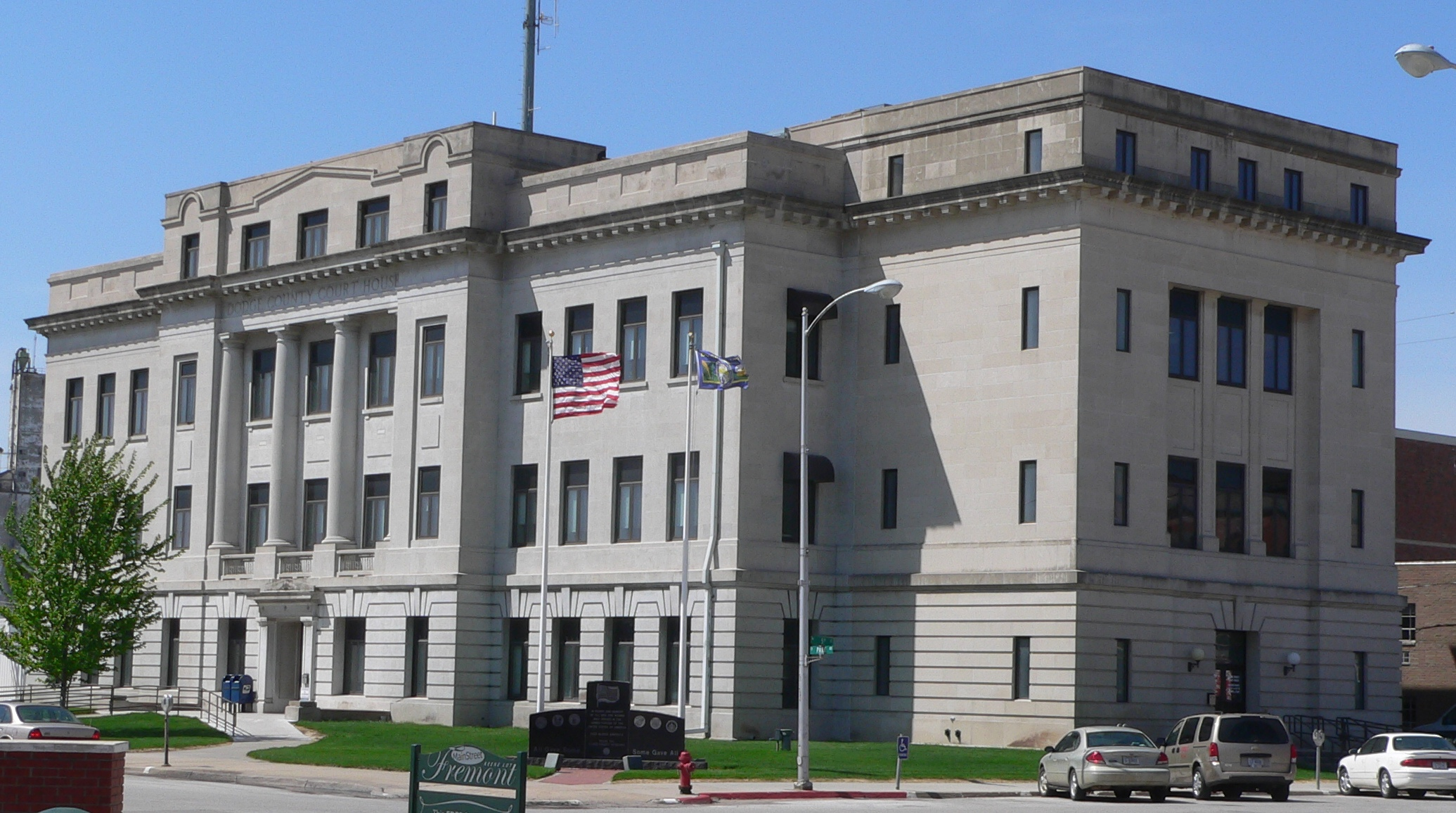
- The Dodge County Courthouse in Fremont

- Location within the U.S. state of Nebraska
- Coordinates: 41.577008°N 96.645852°W
- Country: United States
- State: Nebraska
- Founded: November 23, 1854
- Named for: Augustus C. Dodge
- Seat: Fremont
- Largest city: Fremont

Area
  - Total: 543.002 sq mi (1,406.37 km^{2})
  - Land: 528.844 sq mi (1,369.70 km^{2})
  - Water: 14.158 sq mi (36.67 km^{2}) 2.61%

Population (2020)
  - Total: 37,167
  - Estimate (2025): 38,057 ▲
  - Density: 70.280/sq mi (27.135/km^{2})
- Time zone: UTC−6 (Central)
  - Summer (DST): UTC−5 (CDT)
- Area code: 402 and 531
- Congressional district: 1st
- Website: dodgecounty.nebraska.gov
- • Nebraska county number 27 • Nebraska license plate prefix 05

Dodge County is a county in the U.S. state of Nebraska. As of the 2020 census, the population was 37,167, and was estimated to be 38,057 in 2025, making it the sixth-most populous county in Nebraska. The county seat and the largest city is Fremont.

Dodge County comprises the Fremont, NE Micropolitan area, which is also included in the Omaha-Council Bluffs-Fremont, NE-IA combined area.

In the Nebraska license plate system, Dodge County is represented by the prefix "5" (as it had the fifth-largest number of vehicles registered in the state when the license plate system was established in 1922).

== History ==
Dodge County was created on November 23, 1854 and named after Iowa Senator Augustus C. Dodge.

== Geography ==
According to the United States Census Bureau, the county has a total area of 543.002 square miles (1,406.37 km^{2}), of which 528.844 square miles (1,369.70 km^{2}) is land and 14.158 square miles (36.67 km^{2}) (2.61%) is water. It is the 74th-largest county in Nebraska by total area.

The Elkhorn River runs through the NE part of Dodge County. It drains into the Platte River below the SE corner of the county. The Platte River runs along the south line of Dodge County.

=== Major highways ===
- U.S. Highway 30
- U.S. Highway 77
- U.S. Highway 275
- Nebraska Highway 79
- Nebraska Highway 91

=== Transit ===
- Express Arrow

=== Adjacent counties ===
- Burt County – northeast
- Washington County – east
- Douglas County – southeast
- Saunders County – south
- Colfax County – west
- Cuming County – north

== Demographics ==
Historical population
Census	Pop.	Note	%±
1860	309		—
1870	4,212		1,263.1%
1880	11,263		167.4%
1890	19,260		71.0%
1900	22,298		15.8%
1910	22,145		−0.7%
1920	23,197		4.8%
1930	25,273		8.9%
1940	23,799		−5.8%
1950	26,265		10.4%
1960	32,471		23.6%
1970	34,782		7.1%
1980	35,847		3.1%
1990	34,500		−3.8%
2000	36,160		4.8%
2010	36,691		1.5%
2020	37,167		1.3%
2025 (est.)	38,057	▲	2.4%
U.S. Decennial Census; 1790–1960 1900–1990; 1990–2000 2010–2020

As of the third quarter of 2025, the median home value in Dodge County was $209,854.

As of the 2024 American Community Survey, there are 15,168 estimated households in Dodge County with an average of 2.40 persons per household. The county has a median household income of $74,329. Approximately 11.0% of the county's population lives at or below the poverty line. Dodge County has an estimated 64.0% employment rate, with 22.0% of the population holding a bachelor's degree or higher and 88.4% holding a high school diploma. There were 16,725 housing units at an average density of 31.63 per square mile (12.2/km^{2}).

The top five reported languages (people were allowed to report up to two languages, thus the figures will generally add to more than 100%) were English (84.7%), Spanish (14.0%), Indo-European (0.6%), Asian and Pacific Islander (0.3%), and Other (0.4%).

The median age in the county was 39.3 years.

Dodge County, Nebraska – racial and ethnic composition Note: the US Census treats Hispanic/Latino as an ethnic category. This table excludes Latinos from the racial categories and assigns them to a separate category. Hispanics/Latinos may be of any race.
Race / ethnicity (NH = non-Hispanic)	Pop. 1980	Pop. 1990	Pop. 2000	Pop. 2010	Pop. 2020
White alone (NH)	35,450 (98.89%)	33,979 (98.49%)	34,110 (94.33%)	32,120 (87.54%)	29,501 (79.37%)
Black or African American alone (NH)	55 (0.15%)	63 (0.18%)	145 (0.40%)	183 (0.50%)	215 (0.58%)
Native American or Alaska Native alone (NH)	77 (0.21%)	109 (0.32%)	84 (0.23%)	127 (0.35%)	133 (0.36%)
Asian alone (NH)	85 (0.24%)	119 (0.34%)	178 (0.49%)	180 (0.49%)	183 (0.49%)
Pacific Islander alone (NH)	—	—	22 (0.06%)	31 (0.08%)	12 (0.03%)
Other race alone (NH)	23 (0.06%)	7 (0.02%)	10 (0.03%)	32 (0.09%)	93 (0.25%)
Mixed race or multiracial (NH)	—	—	190 (0.53%)	329 (0.90%)	947 (2.55%)
Hispanic or Latino (any race)	157 (0.44%)	223 (0.65%)	1,421 (3.93%)	3,689 (10.05%)	6,083 (16.37%)
Total	35,847 (100.00%)	34,500 (100.00%)	36,160 (100.00%)	36,691 (100.00%)	37,167 (100.00%)

=== 2024 estimate ===
As of the 2024 estimate, there were 37,884 people, 15,168 households, and _ families residing in the county. The population density was 71.64 inhabitants per square mile (27.7/km^{2}). There were 16,725 housing units at an average density of 31.63 per square mile (12.2/km^{2}). The racial makeup of the county was 92.8% White (76.5% NH White), 1.5% African American, 2.7% Native American, 0.8% Asian, 0.4% Pacific Islander, _% from some other races and 1.8% from two or more races. Hispanic or Latino people of any race were 19.9% of the population.

=== 2020 census ===
As of the 2020 census, there were 37,167 people, 14,813 households, and 9,670 families residing in the county. The population density was 70.28 inhabitants per square mile (27.1/km^{2}). There were 16,191 housing units at an average density of 30.62 per square mile (11.8/km^{2}). The racial makeup of the county was 82.19% White, 0.66% African American, 0.94% Native American, 0.55% Asian, 0.05% Pacific Islander, 8.55% from some other races and 7.05% from two or more races. Hispanic or Latino people of any race were 16.37% of the population.

The median age was 38.8 years. 24.5% of residents were under the age of 18 and 19.1% of residents were 65 years of age or older. For every 100 females there were 97.9 males, and for every 100 females age 18 and over there were 97.5 males age 18 and over.

76.1% of residents lived in urban areas, while 23.9% lived in rural areas.

There were 14,813 households in the county, of which 30.8% had children under the age of 18 living with them and 25.0% had a female householder with no spouse or partner present. About 28.6% of all households were made up of individuals and 13.7% had someone living alone who was 65 years of age or older.

There were 16,191 housing units, of which 8.5% were vacant. Among occupied housing units, 65.0% were owner-occupied and 35.0% were renter-occupied. The homeowner vacancy rate was 1.2% and the rental vacancy rate was 6.0%.

=== 2010 census ===
As of the 2010 census, there were 36,691 people, 14,990 households, and 9,894 families residing in the county. The population density was 69.38 inhabitants per square mile (26.8/km^{2}). There were 16,584 housing units at an average density of 31.36 per square mile (12.1/km^{2}). The racial makeup of the county was 90.86% White, 0.56% African American, 0.49% Native American, 0.52% Asian, 0.20% Pacific Islander, 5.95% from some other races and 1.42% from two or more races. Hispanic or Latino people of any race were 10.05% of the population.

=== 2000 census ===
As of the 2000 census, there were 36,160 people, 14,433 households, and 9,756 families residing in the county. The population density was 68.38 inhabitants per square mile (26.4/km^{2}). There were 15,468 housing units at an average density of 29.25 per square mile (11.3/km^{2}). The racial makeup of the county was 95.90% White, 0.43% African American, 0.30% Native American, 0.51% Asian, 0.09% Pacific Islander, 2.06% from some other races and 0.72% from two or more races. Hispanic or Latino people of any race were 3.93% of the population. 48.1% were of German, 7.6% Irish, 5.7% English and 5.4% American ancestry.

There were 14,433 households, out of which 31.10% had children under the age of 18 living with them, 55.80% were married couples living together, 8.50% had a female householder with no husband present, and 32.40% were non-families. 27.60% of all households were made up of individuals, and 13.40% had someone living alone who was 65 years of age or older. The average household size was 2.42 and the average family size was 2.95.

The county population contained 24.70% under the age of 18, 9.60% from 18 to 24, 26.20% from 25 to 44, 21.90% from 45 to 64, and 17.50% who were 65 years of age or older.

The median income for a household in the county was $37,188, and the median income for a family was $44,790. Males had a median income of $31,108 versus $20,915 for females. The per capita income for the county was $17,757. About 5.30% of families and 8.60% of the population were below the poverty line, including 10.30% of those under age 18 and 7.10% of those age 65 or over.

== Communities ==
=== Cities ===
- Fremont (county seat)
- Hooper
- North Bend
- Scribner

=== Villages ===
- Dodge
- Inglewood
- Nickerson
- Snyder
- Uehling
- Winslow

=== Census-designated place ===
- Ames

=== Other unincorporated communities ===
- Centerville
- Crowell
- Everett
- Oak Springs
- Pleasant Valley
- Purple Cane
- Ridgeley
- Webster

=== Bygone cities ===
- Jalapa

=== Townships ===
- Cotterell
- Cuming
- Elkhorn
- Everett
- Hooper
- Logan
- Maple
- Nickerson
- Pebble
- Platte
- Pleasant Valley
- Ridgeley
- Union
- Webster

== Politics and government ==
Dodge County voters are strongly Republican. In no national election since 1936 has the county selected the Democratic Party candidate. In the Nebraska Legislature, Dodge County is represented by Lynne Walz. While elections to the Legislature are nonpartisan, Walz is a Democrat.

Political Party	Number of registered voters (April 1, 2026)	Percent
Republican	11,924	53.67%
Democratic	4,927	22.17%
Independent	4,803	21.62%
Libertarian	352	1.58%
Legal Marijuana Now	213	0.96%
Total	22,219	100.00%

United States presidential election results for Dodge County, Nebraska
Year	Republican		Democratic		Third party(ies)	
Year	No.	%	No.	%	No.	%
1900	2,632	51.49%	2,410	47.14%	70	1.37%
1904	2,789	59.38%	1,646	35.04%	262	5.58%
1908	2,437	46.34%	2,664	50.66%	158	3.00%
1912	1,330	29.33%	1,987	43.81%	1,218	26.86%
1916	2,446	46.10%	2,644	49.83%	216	4.07%
1920	4,832	70.40%	1,799	26.21%	233	3.39%
1924	3,798	45.63%	2,183	26.23%	2,342	28.14%
1928	6,250	60.59%	4,030	39.07%	35	0.34%
1932	3,489	32.14%	7,247	66.76%	119	1.10%
1936	4,561	40.22%	6,317	55.71%	461	4.07%
1940	7,141	62.51%	4,282	37.49%	0	0.00%
1944	6,803	61.39%	4,278	38.61%	0	0.00%
1948	5,848	54.56%	4,870	45.44%	0	0.00%
1952	9,256	71.54%	3,682	28.46%	0	0.00%
1956	9,210	69.26%	4,088	30.74%	0	0.00%
1960	9,638	67.21%	4,702	32.79%	0	0.00%
1964	6,812	50.30%	6,731	49.70%	0	0.00%
1968	8,059	63.78%	3,755	29.72%	822	6.51%
1972	9,837	72.00%	3,826	28.00%	0	0.00%
1976	8,982	62.03%	5,283	36.48%	216	1.49%
1980	9,522	66.82%	3,564	25.01%	1,164	8.17%
1984	10,201	70.15%	4,266	29.34%	74	0.51%
1988	8,417	57.66%	6,116	41.90%	64	0.44%
1992	7,271	44.30%	4,667	28.44%	4,474	27.26%
1996	7,484	50.95%	5,181	35.27%	2,023	13.77%
2000	8,871	61.30%	5,021	34.69%	580	4.01%
2004	10,716	66.26%	5,250	32.46%	206	1.27%
2008	8,557	55.03%	6,689	43.02%	304	1.95%
2012	8,995	60.17%	5,673	37.95%	282	1.89%
2016	9,933	63.96%	4,544	29.26%	1,052	6.77%
2020	10,984	64.85%	5,544	32.73%	410	2.42%
2024	10,795	65.39%	5,434	32.92%	279	1.69%

=== Law enforcement ===
The Dodge County Sheriff's Office (DCSO) is the primary law enforcement agency for Dodge County, Nebraska. The Sheriff's Office is located at 428 N. Broad St in Fremont.

Currently, DCSO serves the county and its incorporated cities within the county. The only village that relies solely on DCSO for police services is North Bend, Nebraska, which is known as a contract city. All other cities within the county have some type of police department or city marshal.

== Education ==
School districts include:

- Arlington Public Schools, #24, Arlington
- Fremont Public Schools, #1, Fremont
- Howells-Dodge Consolidated Schools, #70, Howells
- Logan View Public Schools, #594, Logan View
- North Bend Central Public Schools, #595, North Bend
- Oakland-Craig Public Schools, #14, Oakland
- Scribner-Snyder Community Schools, #62, Scribner
- West Point Public Schools, #1, West Point

== See also ==
- Dodge County Sheriff's Office
- National Register of Historic Places listings in Dodge County, Nebraska
