= Dodge County Courthouse =

Dodge County Courthouse may refer to:

- Dodge County Courthouse (Georgia), Eastman, Georgia
- Dodge County Courthouse (Minnesota), Mantorville, Minnesota
- Dodge County Courthouse (Nebraska), Fremont, Nebraska
