= Union Township, Nebraska =

Union Township, Nebraska may refer to the following places:

- Union Township, Butler County, Nebraska
- Union Township, Dodge County, Nebraska
- Union Township, Knox County, Nebraska
- Union Township, Phelps County, Nebraska
- Union Township, Saunders County, Nebraska

== See also ==
- West Union Township, Custer County, Nebraska
- Union Township (disambiguation)
