= Hooper Township, Dodge County, Nebraska =

Hooper Township
- Township
- Location in Dodge County
- Coordinates: 41°36′38″N 096°30′10″W
- Country: United States
- State: Nebraska
- County: Dodge

Area
  - Total: 35.66 sq mi (92.37 km^{2})
  - Land: 35.02 sq mi (90.69 km^{2})
  - Water: 0.65 sq mi (1.68 km^{2}) 1.82%
- Elevation: 1,211 ft (369 m)

Population (2020)
  - Total: 1,160
  - Density: 33.1/sq mi (12.8/km^{2})
- GNIS feature ID: 0838063

Hooper Township is one of fourteen townships in Dodge County, Nebraska, United States. The population was 1,160 at the 2020 census. A 2021 estimate placed the township's population at 1,131.

Most of the Village of Hooper as well as the entire Village of Winslow lies within the Township.

== See also ==
- County government in Nebraska
