= Cotterell Township, Dodge County, Nebraska =

Cotterell Township
- Township
- Location in Dodge County
- Coordinates: 41°30′10″N 096°43′21″W
- Country: United States
- State: Nebraska
- County: Dodge

Area
  - Total: 53.56 sq mi (138.71 km^{2})
  - Land: 51.95 sq mi (134.55 km^{2})
  - Water: 1.61 sq mi (4.16 km^{2}) 3%
- Elevation: 1,260 ft (384 m)

Population (2000)
  - Total: 400
  - Density: 7.8/sq mi (3/km^{2})
- GNIS feature ID: 0837940

Cotterell Township is one of fourteen townships in Dodge County, Nebraska, United States. The population was 400 at the 2000 census. A 2006 estimate placed the township's population at 391.

== See also ==
- County government in Nebraska
