= Pebble Township, Dodge County, Nebraska =

Pebble Township
- Township
- Location in Dodge County
- Coordinates: 41°42′26″N 096°43′47″W
- Country: United States
- State: Nebraska
- County: Dodge

Area
  - Total: 35.90 sq mi (92.98 km^{2})
  - Land: 35.36 sq mi (91.58 km^{2})
  - Water: 0.54 sq mi (1.4 km^{2}) 1.51%
- Elevation: 1,306 ft (398 m)

Population (2020)
  - Total: 423
  - Density: 12.0/sq mi (4.62/km^{2})
- GNIS feature ID: 0838183

Pebble Township is one of fourteen townships in Dodge County, Nebraska, United States. The population was 423 at the 2020 census. A 2021 estimate placed the township's population at 412.

Most of the Village of Snyder lies within the Township.

== See also ==
- County government in Nebraska
