= Maple Township, Dodge County, Nebraska =

Maple Township
- Township
- Location in Dodge County
- Coordinates: 41°31′22″N 096°36′33″W
- Country: United States
- State: Nebraska
- County: Dodge

Area
  - Total: 35.99 sq mi (93.21 km^{2})
  - Land: 35.97 sq mi (93.16 km^{2})
  - Water: 0.019 sq mi (0.05 km^{2}) 0.05%
- Elevation: 1,316 ft (401 m)

Population (2020)
  - Total: 326
  - Density: 9.06/sq mi (3.50/km^{2})
- GNIS feature ID: 0838125

Maple Township is one of fourteen townships in Dodge County, Nebraska, United States. The population was 326 at the 2020 census. A 2021 estimate placed the township's population at 318.

== See also ==
- County government in Nebraska
