= Ebenezer Webster =

American politician

Ebenezer Webster (born in Kingston, New Hampshire, April 22, 1739; died in Salisbury (now part of Franklin), New Hampshire, April 22, 1806) was a United States farmer, innkeeper, militia member, politician and judge. He was the father of Daniel Webster, a noted lawyer and orator who served in the United States Congress, as United States Secretary of State, and in other offices.

== Biography ==
Ebenezer was a Judge with Hillsborough County, New Hampshire a farmer and innkeeper. He served under General Amherst in the French and Indian War, and in 1761 was one of the original settlers of that part of the town of Salisbury now known as Franklin, then the northernmost New England settlement.

=== Revolutionary War ===
At the outbreak of the American Revolutionary War, he led the Salisbury militia to Cambridge, Massachusetts. Subsequently, he fought at White Plains and Bennington, was at West Point during the treason of Arnold, and served in other campaigns until the close of the war, when he had attained the rank of colonel of militia.

=== Public career ===
He was at various times a member of one or the other branch of the legislature, those being the New Hampshire House of Representatives and the New Hampshire Senate, and from 1791 till his death was judge of the court of common pleas of Hillsborough County.

== Family ==
His eldest son by his second wife, Abigail Eastman, was named Ezekiel. Ezekiel was born in Salisbury, March 11, 1780, and died in Concord, April 10, 1829. Ezekiel graduated from Dartmouth College in 1804, studied law, and rose to eminence in his profession. He also served in the state legislature. He died while trying a case in court in Concord. Ebenezer's second son by Abigail was Daniel, a noted statesman of the United States.
