= Purple Cane, Nebraska =

Unincorporated community in Nebraska, U.S.

Purple Cane is an unincorporated community in Dodge County, Nebraska, United States.

== Geography ==
Purple Cane is located at 41.5250°N 96.8911°W at an elevation of 1,381 feet (421 meters). It is located 5 mi (8.0 km) west and 4 mi (6.4 km) north of North Bend on the bluff north of the Platte River near the intersection of County Road P, and County Road 2 in Dodge County. Between 1872 and 1902, Purple Cane appeared on most Nebraska maps. All that remains of the community today is a cemetery and two historic markers.

== History ==
The site of Purple Cane was settled in 1858 by Irish immigrant Edward Johnson. Johnson constructed a dugout on the south bank of Maple Creek and resided there during the winter of 1858–59. He was soon joined by his brother Michael Johnson and brother-in-law David Scott. Between 1861 and 1867, five additional households were established in the area. The rural community was officially named in 1872 when Samuel R. Mason applied for a post office permit for the area. Mason chose to name the community after the Purple Cane raspberries that grew in his garden. In the 1870s most of the land in the area was claimed.

=== School ===
In 1867, School District #7 was established next to the Old Fur Traders Trail. A school house was erected with lumber brought from Fremont, Nebraska. Thomas Spence, was the first teacher. In 1875 the school was relocated to the nearby Hughes farm, and enlarged in 1894. In 1904, the school was moved to land owned by George Thrush and a new school building was erected. In 1932, the school had an enrollment of 9 students.

=== Post Office ===
Samuel R. Mason applied for a post office for the community in 1872. The request was granted on April 15, 1872. The post office was a box with a hinged lid that hung on the wall of the S. R. Mason Home. Mail was delivered from nearby North Bend to Purple Cane twice weekly. The post office was eventually moved to the home of Jane Avery who acted as post master from 1886 to 1892 when the post office was closed. A monument marking the site of the original Purple Cane post office was erected in 1928.

=== Churches ===
The Purple Cane Methodist Episcopal Church was established in 1869. Andrew Quigley donated land for the organization, and a church building was erected and dedicated in 1886. The church was destroyed by fire in 1894, and rebuilt the same year. In 1925 a large gymnasium was added to the property for community use. By 1920, the church reported a membership of 160 people. Declining membership caused the church to close in 1964. The church and its contents were auctioned off on October 12, 1980. The location of the church is marked by a stone marker.

The Plymouth Presbyterian church was organized by Edward Johnson, John Ruff, and J. G. McVicker in September 1890 and built on the Edward Johnson property. It was an active church until 1912.

=== Cemetery ===
The first burial at Purple Cane cemetery was of Mrs. John McCarthy in 1873. The Purple Cane Cemetery Association was organized in 1881 and property for the cemetery was purchased just south of the site for the Purple Cane Methodist Episcopal Church. In 1916, Alexander Legge, then president of the International Harvester Corporation, gifted $1,000 to the Purple Cane Cemetery Association to assist with the establishment of a perpetual care fund for the cemetery. Residents raised matching funds, and the cemetery was improved with sidewalks and a fence.

== Notable person ==
Alexander Legge (1866-1933), prominent American business executive.
