= Everett, Nebraska =

Unincorporated community in Nebraska, United States

- Unincorporated Community
- Interactive map of Everett, Nebraska
- Coordinates: 41.61121°N 96.61660°W
- Country: United States
- State: Nebraska
- County: Dodge

Everett is an unincorporated area in Dodge County, Nebraska, United States.

== History ==
A post office was established at Everett in 1875, and remained in operation until it was discontinued in 1907. Everett was likely named for a pioneer settler.
