= Webster Township, Dodge County, Nebraska =

Webster Township
- Township
- Location in Dodge County
- Coordinates: 41°42′22″N 096°50′56″W
- Country: United States
- State: Nebraska
- County: Dodge

Area
  - Total: 36.17 sq mi (93.67 km^{2})
  - Land: 36.17 sq mi (93.67 km^{2})
  - Water: 0 sq mi (0 km^{2}) 0%
- Elevation: 1,355 ft (413 m)

Population (2020)
  - Total: 872
  - Density: 24.1/sq mi (9.31/km^{2})
- GNIS feature ID: 0838321

Webster Township is one of fourteen townships in Dodge County, Nebraska, United States. The population was 872 at the 2020 census. A 2021 estimate placed the township's population at 848.

The Village of Dodge and a portion of the Village of Snyder lie within the Township.

== See also ==
- County government in Nebraska
