= Dodge, Nebraska =

- Village
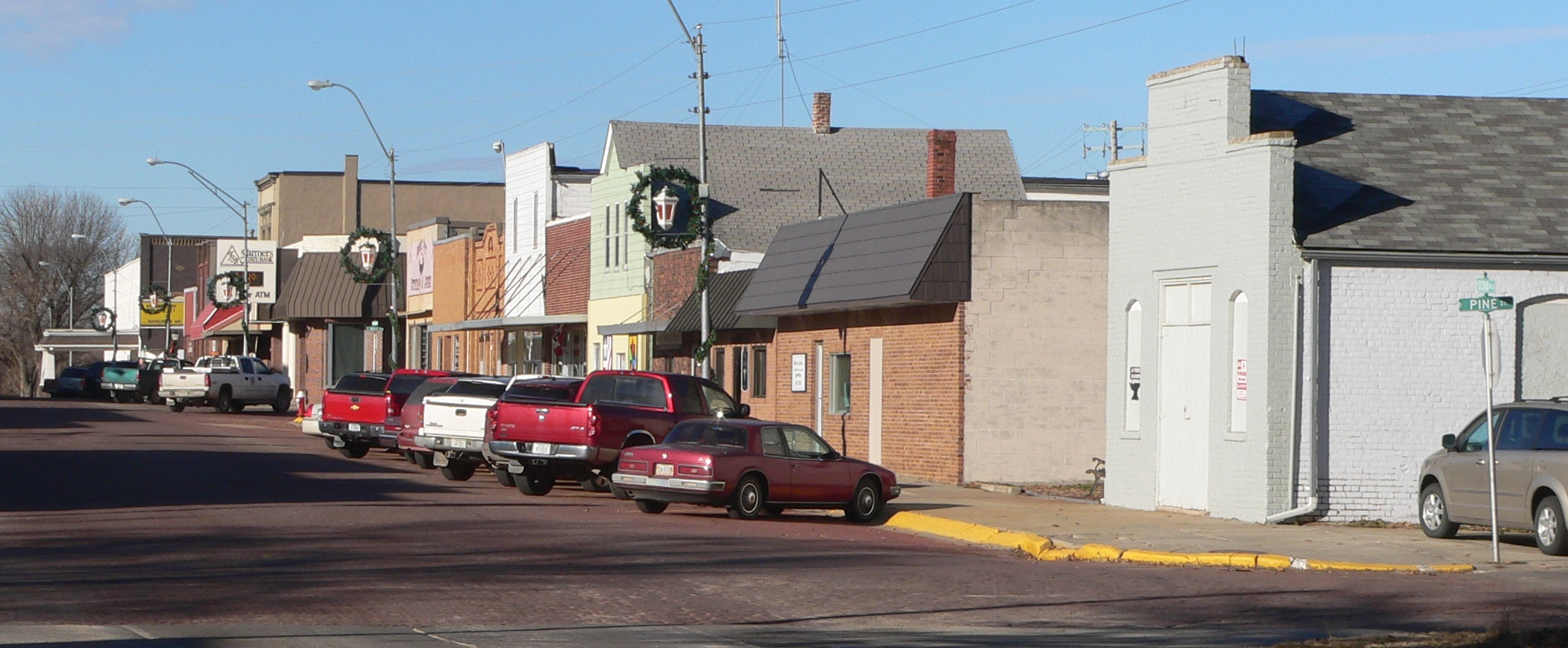
- Downtown Dodge

- Location of Dodge, Nebraska

- Location within Nebraska Location within the United States
- Coordinates: 41°43′19″N 96°52′49″W
- Country: United States
- State: Nebraska
- County: Dodge
- Township: Webster

Area
  - Total: 0.39 sq mi (1.02 km^{2})
  - Land: 0.39 sq mi (1.02 km^{2})
  - Water: 0 sq mi (0.00 km^{2})
- Elevation: 1,421 ft (433 m)

Population (2020)
  - Total: 611
  - Density: 1,546.7/sq mi (597.17/km^{2})
- Time zone: UTC-6 (Central (CST))
  - Summer (DST): UTC-5 (CDT)
- ZIP code: 68633
- Area code: 402
- FIPS code: 31-13295
- GNIS feature ID: 2398733
- Website: dodgenebraska.us

Dodge is a village in Dodge County, Nebraska, United States. As of the 2020 census, Dodge had a population of 611.

== History ==
Dodge was platted in 1886 when the Fremont, Elkhorn and Missouri Valley Railroad was extended to that point. It was named for George A. Dodge, a pioneer settler. Dodge was incorporated as a village in 1887.

== Geography ==
According to the United States Census Bureau, the village has a total area of 0.40 square miles (1.04 km^{2}), all land.

=== Climate ===
This climatic region is typified by large seasonal temperature differences, with warm to hot (and often humid) summers and cold (sometimes severely cold) winters. According to the Köppen Climate Classification system, Dodge has a humid continental climate, abbreviated "Dfa" on climate maps.

== Demographics ==
Historical population
Census	Pop.	Note	%±
1890	338		—
1900	554		63.9%
1910	661		19.3%
1920	648		−2.0%
1930	693		6.9%
1940	656		−5.3%
1950	633		−3.5%
1960	649		2.5%
1970	704		8.5%
1980	815		15.8%
1990	693		−15.0%
2000	700		1.0%
2010	612		−12.6%
2020	611		−0.2%
U.S. Decennial Census

=== 2010 census ===
At the 2010 census, there were 612 people, 257 households and 158 families living in the village. The population density was 1,530.0 inhabitants per square mile (590.7/km^{2}). There were 289 housing units at an average density of 722.5 per square mile (279.0/km^{2}). The racial makeup of the village was 93.6% White, 0.3% African American, 0.7% Native American, 5.2% from other races, and 0.2% from two or more races. Hispanic or Latino of any race were 4.6% of the population.

There were 257 households, of which 26.5% had children under the age of 18 living with them, 50.6% were married couples living together, 6.2% had a female householder with no husband present, 4.7% had a male householder with no wife present, and 38.5% were non-families. 35.4% of all households were made up of individuals, and 19.1% had someone living alone who was 65 years of age or older. The average household size was 2.16 and the average family size was 2.77.

The median age in the village was 49.6 years. 20.4% of residents were under the age of 18; 5.3% were between the ages of 18 and 24; 18.8% were from 25 to 44; 22.4% were from 45 to 64; and 33.2% were 65 years of age or older. The gender makeup of the village was 47.9% male and 52.1% female.

=== 2000 census ===
At the 2000 census, there were 700 people, 270 households and 183 families living in the village. The population density was 1,758.7 inhabitants per square mile (679.0/km^{2}). There were 300 housing units at an average density of 753.7 per square mile (291.0/km^{2}). The racial makeup of the village was 97.43% White, 0.14% Native American, 0.14% Asian, 2.00% from other races, and 0.29% from two or more races. Hispanic or Latino of any race were 2.29% of the population.

There were 270 households, of which 30.0% had children under the age of 18 living with them, 60.7% were married couples living together, 6.3% had a female householder with no husband present, and 31.9% were non-families. 29.6% of all households were made up of individuals, and 18.1% had someone living alone who was 65 years of age or older. The average household size was 2.37 and the average family size was 2.95.

The median age was 43 years. 24.1% of the population were under the age of 18, 5.0% from 18 to 24, 22.9% from 25 to 44, 17.7% from 45 to 64, and 30.3% who were 65 years of age or older. For every 100 females, there were 86.7 males. For every 100 females aged 18 and over, there were 87.0 males.

The median household income was $33,864 and the median family income was $37,679. Males had a median income of $28,000 compared with $19,167 for females. The per capita income for the village was $15,373. About 5.0% of families and 7.0% of the population were below the poverty line, including 8.6% of those under age 18 and 9.0% of those age 65 or over.
