= Centerville, Nebraska =

Unincorporated community in Nebraska, United States

- Unincorporated community
- Interactive map of Centerville, Nebraska
- Country: United States
- State: Nebraska
- County: Dodge
- Time zone: UTC-6 (Central (CST))
  - Summer (DST): UTC-5 (CDT)
- Area code: 402

Centerville is an unincorporated community in Dodge County, Nebraska, United States. Centerville was once nominated to serve as the county seat for Dodge County; however, voters turned down the proposal in the election held September 9, 1884.
