= Ridgeley Township, Dodge County, Nebraska =

Ridgeley Township
- Township
- Location in Dodge County
- Coordinates: 41°36′42″N 096°44′00″W
- Country: United States
- State: Nebraska
- County: Dodge

Area
  - Total: 35.97 sq mi (93.17 km^{2})
  - Land: 35.97 sq mi (93.17 km^{2})
  - Water: 0 sq mi (0 km^{2}) 0%
- Elevation: 1,300 ft (400 m)

Population (2020)
  - Total: 190
  - Density: 5.3/sq mi (2.0/km^{2})
- GNIS feature ID: 0838212

Ridgeley Township is one of fourteen townships in Dodge County, Nebraska, United States. The population was 190 at the 2020 census. A 2021 estimate placed the township's population at 185.

== See also ==
- County government in Nebraska
