= Crowell, Nebraska =

Unincorporated community in Nebraska, United States

- Unincorporated Community
- Location within Nebraska Location within the United States
- Coordinates: 41.7°N 96.7°W
- Country: United States
- State: Nebraska
- County: Dodge
- Founded: 1883

Crowell is an unincorporated community in Dodge County, Nebraska, United States.

== History ==
Crowell was laid out in 1883. It was either named for the proprietor of a local grain elevator or for Prince S. Crowell, a railroad official.

=== Oak Springs ===
Prior to the platting of Crowell, a small settlement called Oak Springs had been established southwest of the present site.

== Bibliography ==
=== References ===
- Buss, Rev. William Henry (1852–1926); Osterman, Thomas Theodore (1876–1931), eds. (1921). History of Dodge and Washington Counties, Nebraska and Their People. Retrieved June 5, 2024. OCLC 729491040 (all editions).
1. Vol 1 – via Google Books (Wisconsin Historical Society).
2. Vol 2 – via Google Books (Yale University).
- Federal Writers' Project (1938). Origin of Nebraska place names. Lincoln, NE: Works Progress Administration. p. 9.
- "Map of the State of Nebraska Showing the Lands of the Burlington & Missouri Riv. R.R. Co. in Nebraska" (Alphanumeric grid coordinates: R, 9). New York: G.W. & C.B. Colton & Co. → Joseph Hutchins Colton (1800–1893). Sons: George Woolworth Colton (1827–1901) and Charles Burnham Colton (1832–1916). 1876. LCCN 98-688604; OCLC 860942231.
  Re: Map showing Oak Springs.
- Stennett, William H. (1832–1915), ed. (1908). A History of the Origin of the Place Names Connected with the Chicago & North Western and Chicago, St. Paul, Minneapolis & Omaha Railways. p. 61 – via Google Books (Ohio State University).
- "U.S. Geological Survey Geographic Names Information System" → "Crowell, Nebraska" (Feature ID: 828491). United States Geological Survey. March 9, 1979 [December 31, 1981].
