= Cuming Township, Dodge County, Nebraska =

Cuming Township
- Township
- Location in Dodge County
- Coordinates: 41°41′41″N 096°37′40″W
- Country: United States
- State: Nebraska
- County: Dodge

Area
  - Total: 35.51 sq mi (91.97 km^{2})
  - Land: 35.40 sq mi (91.69 km^{2})
  - Water: 0.11 sq mi (0.28 km^{2}) 0.3%
- Elevation: 1,371 ft (418 m)

Population (2020)
  - Total: 213
  - Density: 6.02/sq mi (2.32/km^{2})
- GNIS feature ID: 0837952

Cuming Township is one of fourteen townships in Dodge County, Nebraska, United States. The population was 213 at the 2020 census. A 2021 estimate placed the township's population at 208.

== See also ==
- County government in Nebraska
