= Winslow, Nebraska =

- Village
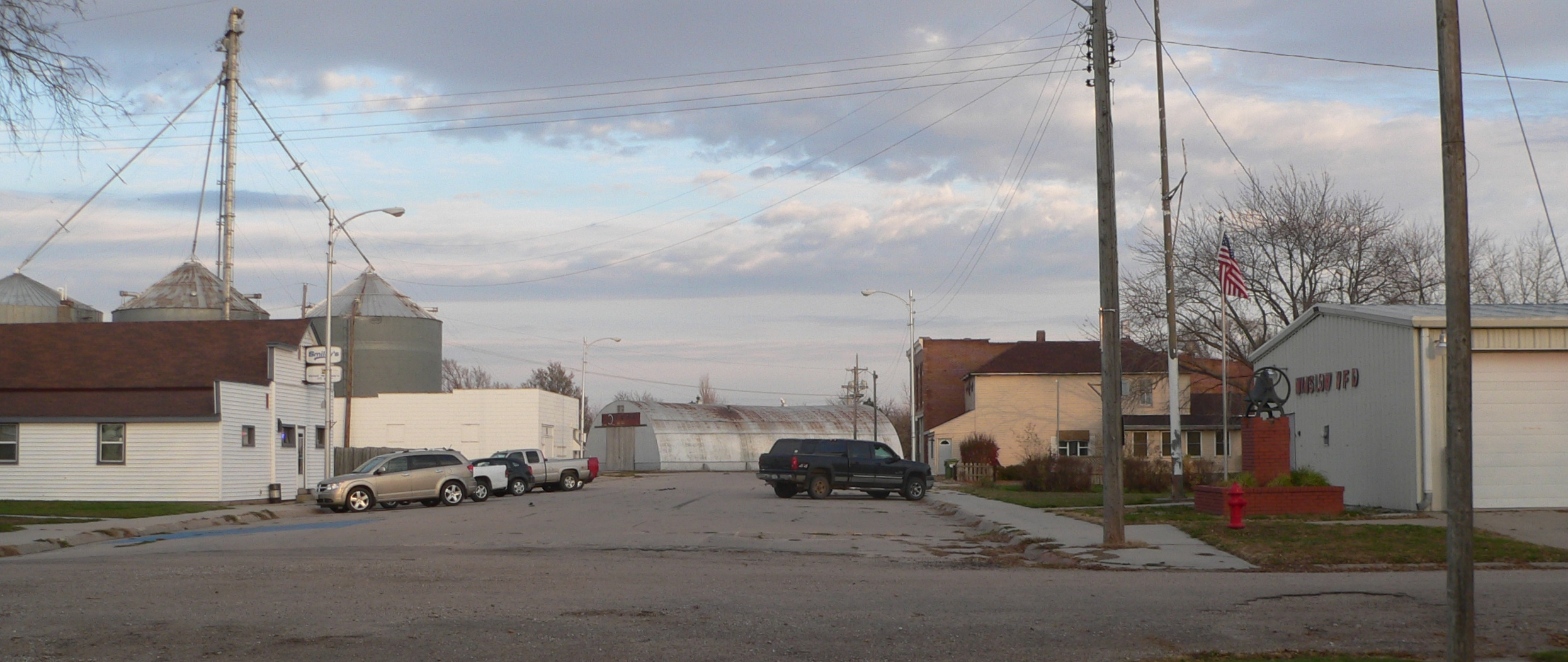
- Main Street, Winslow

- Location of Winslow, Nebraska
- Coordinates: 41°36′36″N 96°30′17″W
- Country: United States
- State: Nebraska
- County: Dodge

Area
  - Total: 0.14 sq mi (0.37 km^{2})
  - Land: 0.14 sq mi (0.37 km^{2})
  - Water: 0 sq mi (0.00 km^{2})
- Elevation: 1,214 ft (370 m)

Population (2020)
  - Total: 19
  - Density: 131.5/sq mi (50.76/km^{2})
- Time zone: UTC-6 (Central (CST))
  - Summer (DST): UTC-5 (CDT)
- ZIP code: 68072
- Area code: 402
- FIPS code: 31-53415
- GNIS feature ID: 2399722

Winslow is a village in Dodge County, Nebraska, United States. As of the 2020 census, Winslow had a population of 19.

== History ==
Winslow was platted in 1906. The origin of the name Winslow has not been identified. It was incorporated as a village in 1909.

In March 2019 a flood destroyed Winslow. Flood water trapped many in their homes and resulted in many homes being abandoned, leading to many moving to neighboring areas.

== Geography ==
According to the United States Census Bureau, the village has a total area of 0.06 square miles (0.16 km^{2}), all land.

== Demographics ==
Historical population
Census	Pop.	Note	%±
1910	99		—
1920	154		55.6%
1930	156		1.3%
1940	130		−16.7%
1950	138		6.2%
1960	136		−1.4%
1970	145		6.6%
1980	143		−1.4%
1990	140		−2.1%
2000	104		−25.7%
2010	103		−1.0%
2020	19		−81.6%
U.S. Decennial Census

=== 2010 census ===
As of the census of 2010, there were 103 people, 40 households, and 30 families living in the village. The population density was 1,716.7 inhabitants per square mile (662.8/km^{2}). There were 46 housing units at an average density of 766.7 per square mile (296.0/km^{2}). The racial makeup of the village was 99.0% White and 1.0% Native American. Hispanic or Latino of any race were 1.0% of the population.

There were 40 households, of which 35.0% had children under the age of 18 living with them, 57.5% were married couples living together, 5.0% had a female householder with no husband present, 12.5% had a male householder with no wife present, and 25.0% were non-families. 17.5% of all households were made up of individuals, and 2.5% had someone living alone who was 65 years of age or older. The average household size was 2.58 and the average family size was 2.93.

The median age in the village was 38.5 years. 24.3% of residents were under the age of 18; 6.9% were between the ages of 18 and 24; 29.2% were from 25 to 44; 28.1% were from 45 to 64; and 11.7% were 65 years of age or older. The gender makeup of the village was 49.5% male and 50.5% female.

=== 2000 census ===
As of the census of 2000, there were 104 people, 41 households, and 30 families living in the village. The population density was 1,744.9 inhabitants per square mile (673.7/km^{2}). There were 45 housing units at an average density of 755.0 per square mile (291.5/km^{2}). The racial makeup of the village was 99.04% White and 0.96% Native American. Hispanic or Latino of any race were 3.85% of the population.

There were 41 households, out of which 31.7% had children under the age of 18 living with them, 61.0% were married couples living together, 7.3% had a female householder with no husband present, and 26.8% were non-families. 22.0% of all households were made up of individuals, and 7.3% had someone living alone who was 65 years of age or older. The average household size was 2.54 and the average family size was 2.97.

In the village, the population was spread out, with 23.1% under the age of 18, 14.4% from 18 to 24, 30.8% from 25 to 44, 24.0% from 45 to 64, and 7.7% who were 65 years of age or older. The median age was 36 years. For every 100 females, there were 89.1 males. For every 100 females age 18 and over, there were 105.1 males.

As of 2000 the median income for a household in the village was $25,000, and the median income for a family was $50,625. Males had a median income of $25,000 versus $20,000 for females. The per capita income for the village was $14,766. There were no families and 5.0% of the population living below the poverty line, including no under eighteens and 13.3% of those over 64.
