= Webster, Nebraska =

Unincorporated community in Nebraska, U.S.

Coordinates: 41°35′50″N 96°47′24″W

Webster is an unincorporated community in Dodge County, Nebraska, United States.

== History ==
A post office was established at Webster in 1871, and remained in operation until it was discontinued in 1902.
