= Union Township, Dodge County, Nebraska =

Union Township
- Township
- Location in Dodge County
- Coordinates: 41°30′39″N 096°51′09″W
- Country: United States
- State: Nebraska
- County: Dodge

Area
  - Total: 50.29 sq mi (130.26 km^{2})
  - Land: 49.02 sq mi (126.95 km^{2})
  - Water: 1.3 sq mi (3.3 km^{2}) 2.53%
- Elevation: 1,296 ft (395 m)

Population (2020)
  - Total: 247
  - Density: 5.04/sq mi (1.95/km^{2})
- GNIS feature ID: 0838297

Union Township is one of fourteen townships in Dodge County, Nebraska, United States. The population was 247 at the 2020 census. A 2021 estimate placed the township's population at 240.

== See also ==
- County government in Nebraska
