= Dodge County Courthouse (Nebraska) =

- U.S. National Register of Historic Places
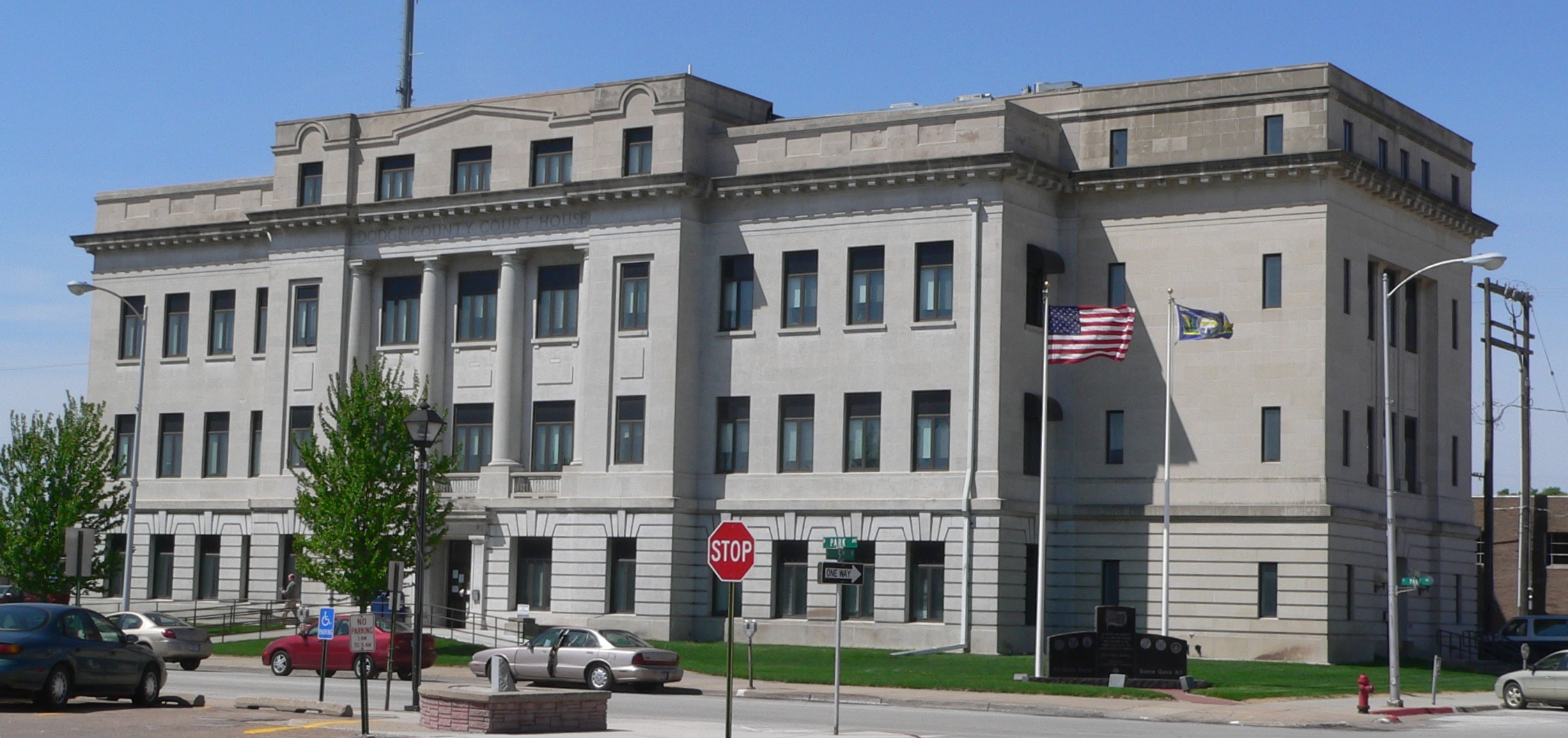

- Location within Nebraska Location within the United States
- Location: 435 N. Park Ave., Fremont, Nebraska
- Coordinates: 41°26′00″N 96°29′51″W
- Area: 1.5 acres (0.61 ha)
- Built: 1917-18
- Architect: A.H. Dyer Co.
- Architectural style: Classical Revival
- MPS: County Courthouses of Nebraska MPS
- NRHP reference No.: 89002208
- Added to NRHP: January 10, 1990

The Dodge County Courthouse in Fremont, Nebraska, at 435 N. Park Ave., was built during 1917–18. It was listed on the National Register of Historic Places in 1990.

The courthouse was designed by local architectural firm A.H. Dyer Co. in Classical Revival style.
