= Jeff Webster (checkers player) =

American checkers player and political official (born 1966)

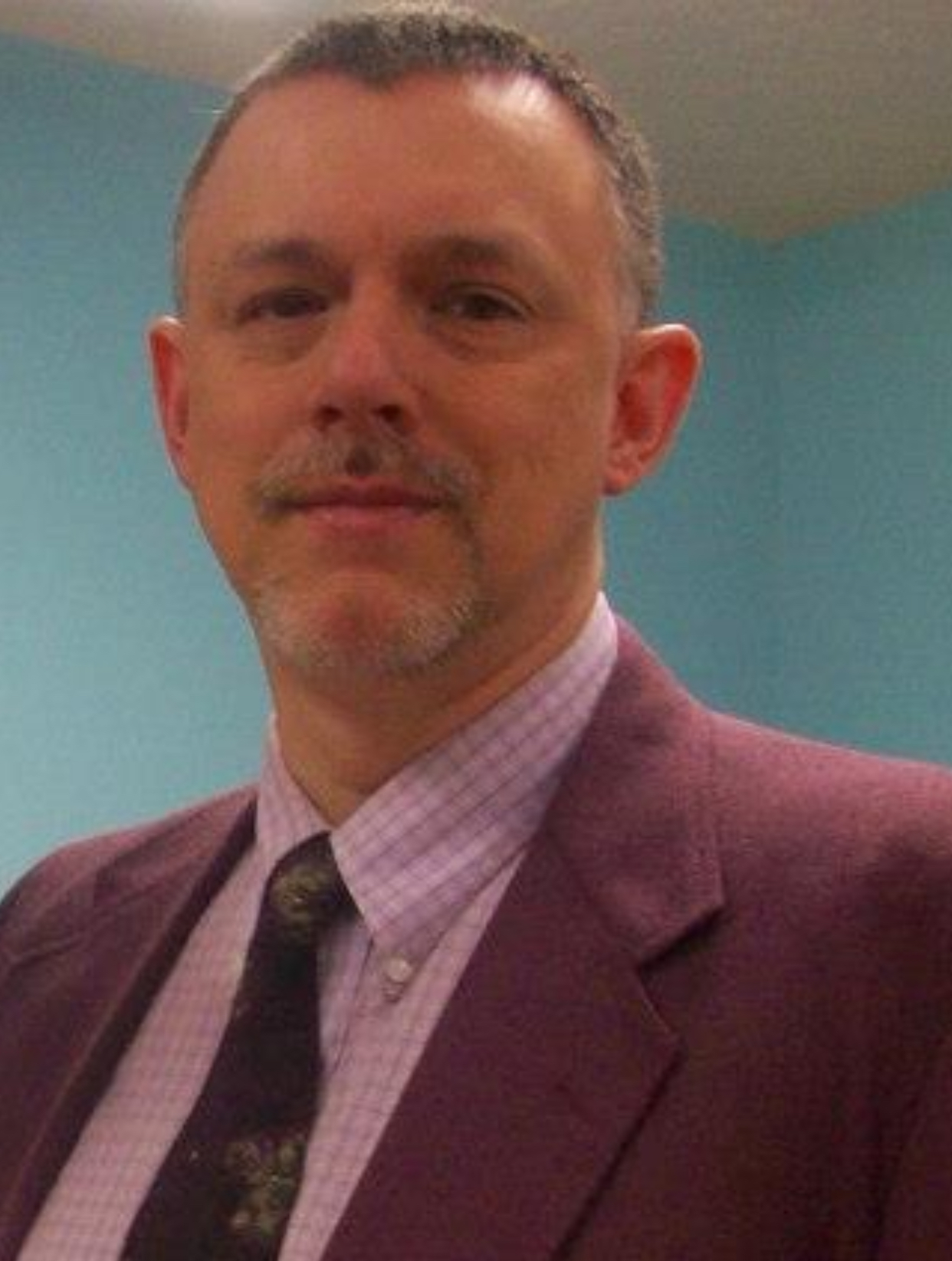
- Webster in 2013

Chair of the Rockingham County Democratic Party
- Incumbent
- Assumed office January 2024

Personal details
- Born: 1966 (age 59–60)
- Party: Democratic
- Spouse: Annie Herger Manning (m. 2008)
- Children: 2
- Parent(s): James Jefferson Webster II; Mary Elizabeth Comer
- Relatives: J.J. Webster (grandfather); John Ray Webster (uncle); Beth Mitchell (cousin)
- Education: Stoneville High School
- Occupation: checkers player musician postmaster

James Jefferson "Jeff" Webster III (born 1966) is an American competitive checkers player and Democratic official. He was the National Youth Checkers Champion in 1981 and the World Youth Checkers Champion in 1982. In January 2024, Webster was appointed as Chair of the Democratic Party of Rockingham County, North Carolina.

== Early life and family ==
Jeff Webster was born in 1966 to James Jefferson Webster II, a business owner, and Mary Elizabeth Comer Webster, who served as Vice Chair of the Rockingham County Democratic Party. He grew up in Stoneville, North Carolina and graduated from Stoneville High School in 1983. He is a grandson of James Jefferson Webster, who served as county commissioner of Rockingham County. Through his paternal grandmother, Nannie Hurt Strong, he is descended from Scottish emigrants George Irving and Jane McDonald, who came to the United States in 1834 from Closeburn, Dumfriesshire aboard the Hector, and is a descendant of the Colonial Virginian Robertson family. Webster is the nephew of checkers champion John Ray Webster and a distant cousin of mathematician Ione Grogan.

== Career ==
Webster served as the postmaster of Stoneville for thirty four years.

In January 2024, Webster was appointed as the Chair of the Rockingham County Democratic Party.

=== Checkers ===
Webster began playing checkers at his grandfather's general store when he was 14 years old, being taught largely by his uncle. He won the United States youth national checkers championship in Texas in 1980. On December 31, 1981 he competed in the World Youth Checkers Championship in Bristol, England. He defeated Andrew Knapp, the English national champion, and became the first person to win the title of World Youth Checkers Champion.

In 2015 he placed second in the Tennessee State Open Majors Division in Lebanon, Tennessee. In 2019 Webster was ranked 47th in the nation and 103rd in the world.

=== Music ===
Webster began playing piano when he was 14 years old. He was formerly a member of the bands Outta Time and Disaster Recovery Band. He was also the keyboardist for The Impacts, a rock and beach music band based in Madison, North Carolina.

Webster served as a member of the 2019–2020 Advisory Grassroots Panel for the Rockingham County Arts Council.

During the COVID-19 pandemic, Webster's bands disbanded. He began performing online weekly on Thursday nights using Facebook's live streaming feature, later calling the series "Jeff's Jammie Jams", a moniker inspired from his wearing pajamas while performing on the live stream.

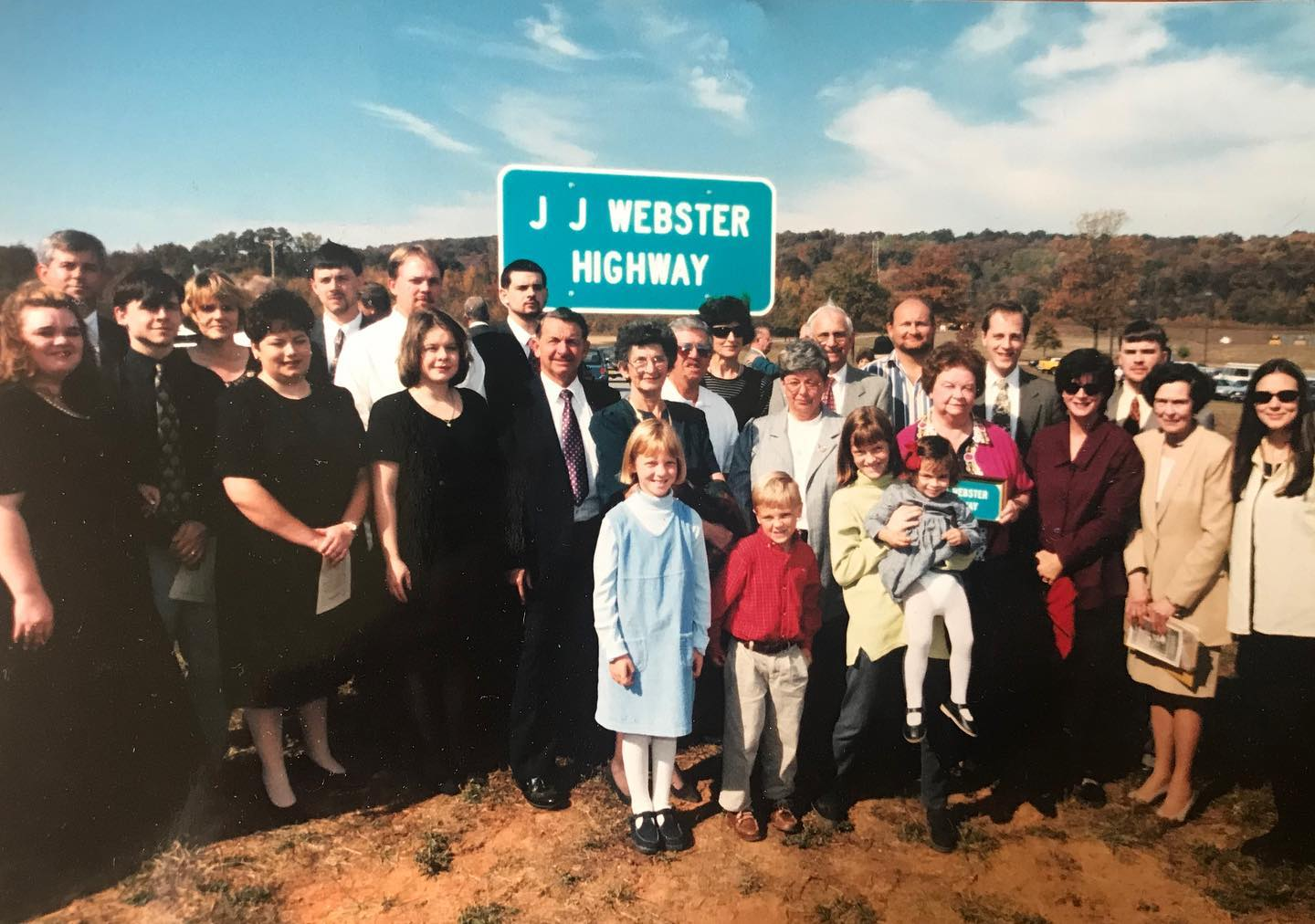
Webster (third to the left from the sign) at the dedication ceremony of J.J. Webster Highway in 1998

== Personal life ==
On March 20, 1998, Webster was working at the Rockingham County Post Office in Stoneville when the 1998 Gainesville–Stoneville tornado outbreak hit. His cousin, Beth Webster Mitchell, was killed in the tornado.

Webster married Annie Herger Manning in 2008. In 2009 he underwent a quadruple bypass at Moses H. Cone Memorial Hospital.
