= Mary Comer Webster =

American political activist (1928–2008)

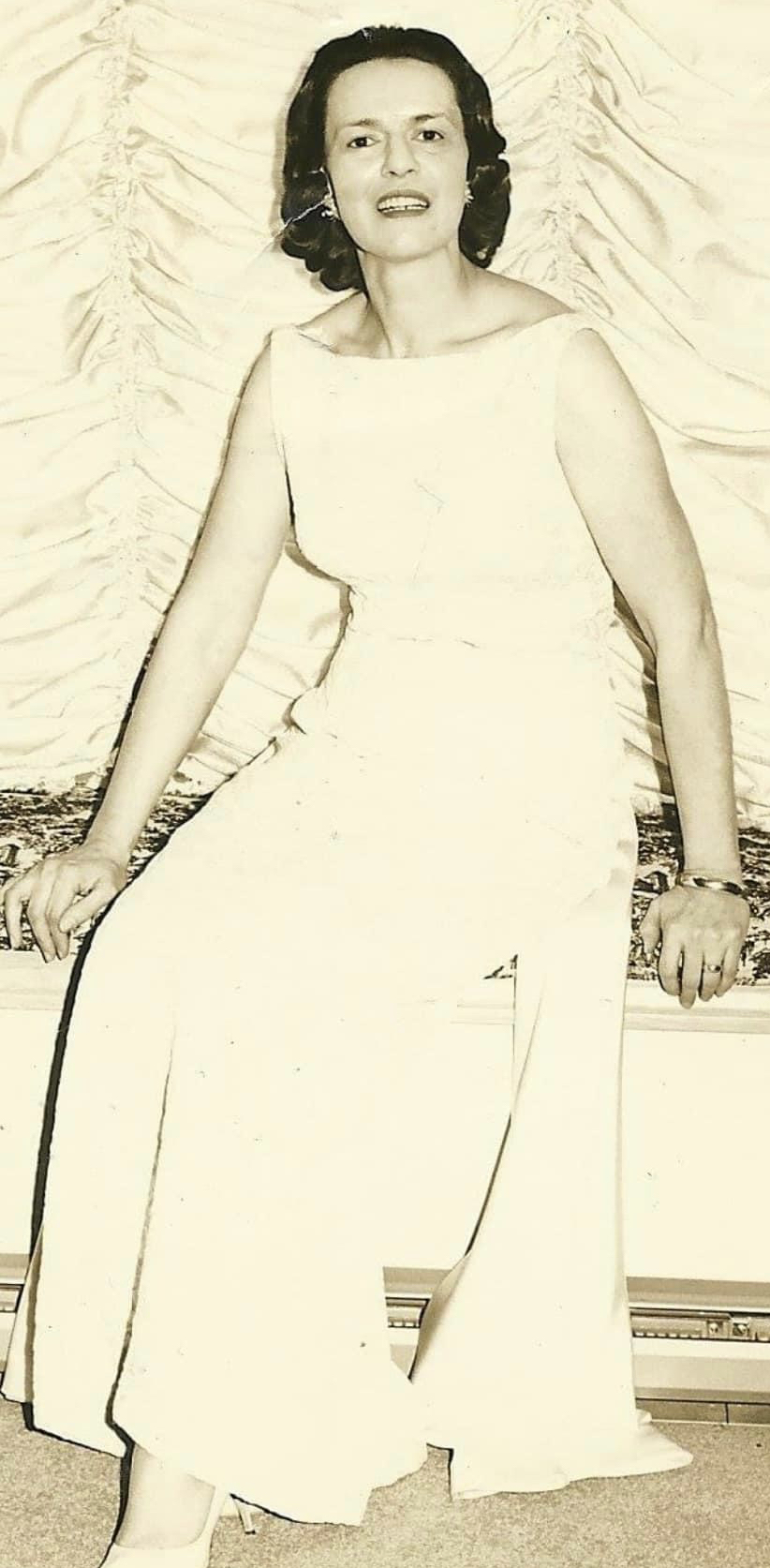
- Webster in 1962

Vice Chair of the Rockingham County Democratic Party

Personal details
- Born: July 20, 1928 Forsyth County, North Carolina, U.S.
- Died: July 4, 2008 (aged 79) Greensboro, North Carolina, U.S.
- Resting place: Centenary United Methodist Church, Stoneville, North Carolina
- Party: Democratic Party
- Spouse: James Jefferson Webster II
- Children: 2 (including James Jefferson Webster III
- Parent(s): John Webster Birch Comer; Martha Isabelle Holyfield
- Relatives: J.J. Webster (father-in-law); John Ray Webster (brother-in-law)

Mary Elizabeth Comer Webster (July 20, 1928 – July 4, 2008) was an American political consultant and Democratic strategist. She managed the Rockingham County and Alamance County campaign offices for Congressman L. Richardson Preyer and served as a national delegate to the 1980 Democratic National Convention. In 1995, she was elected as First Vice Chairwoman of the Democratic Party's Rockingham County Executive Committee.

== Early life ==
Webster was born Mary Elizabeth Comer on July 20, 1928, in Forsyth County, North Carolina to John Webster Birch Comer and Martha Isabelle Holyfield Comer. She had a brother, Webster Milton Comer. Her grandfather, William Thomas Comer, served in the 45th North Carolina Infantry Regiment of the Confederate States Army during the American Civil War.

== Career ==
Webster and her husband operated the Shiloh Community Center. After her husband's death in 1975, Webster co-owned and operated Webster's Store, the family's general store on J.J. Webster Highway in Shiloh, near Stoneville, North Carolina. She also took over the management of rental properties owned by her late husband.

Webster worked for the United States Postal Service, served as a teaching assistant at Stoneville Elementary School, and was a bookkeeper and secretary of the board of trustees for Dumaine Farms. Prior to her death, she worked at a Quiznos restaurant in Eden, North Carolina alongside her daughter, June and grandson, Ryan.

=== Politics ===
Webster was a lifelong member of the North Carolina Democratic Party and served in many capacities for the party's Rockingham County chapter. Webster served as a national delegate to the 1980 Democratic National Convention, nominating President Jimmy Carter and Vice President Walter Mondale for reelection.

She was a congressional assistant to Congressman L. Richardson Preyer. Webster was in charge of Preyer's offices in Rockingham County and, later, was in charge of his Alamance County offices in Burlington. She advised and assisted in managing his successful congressional campaign.

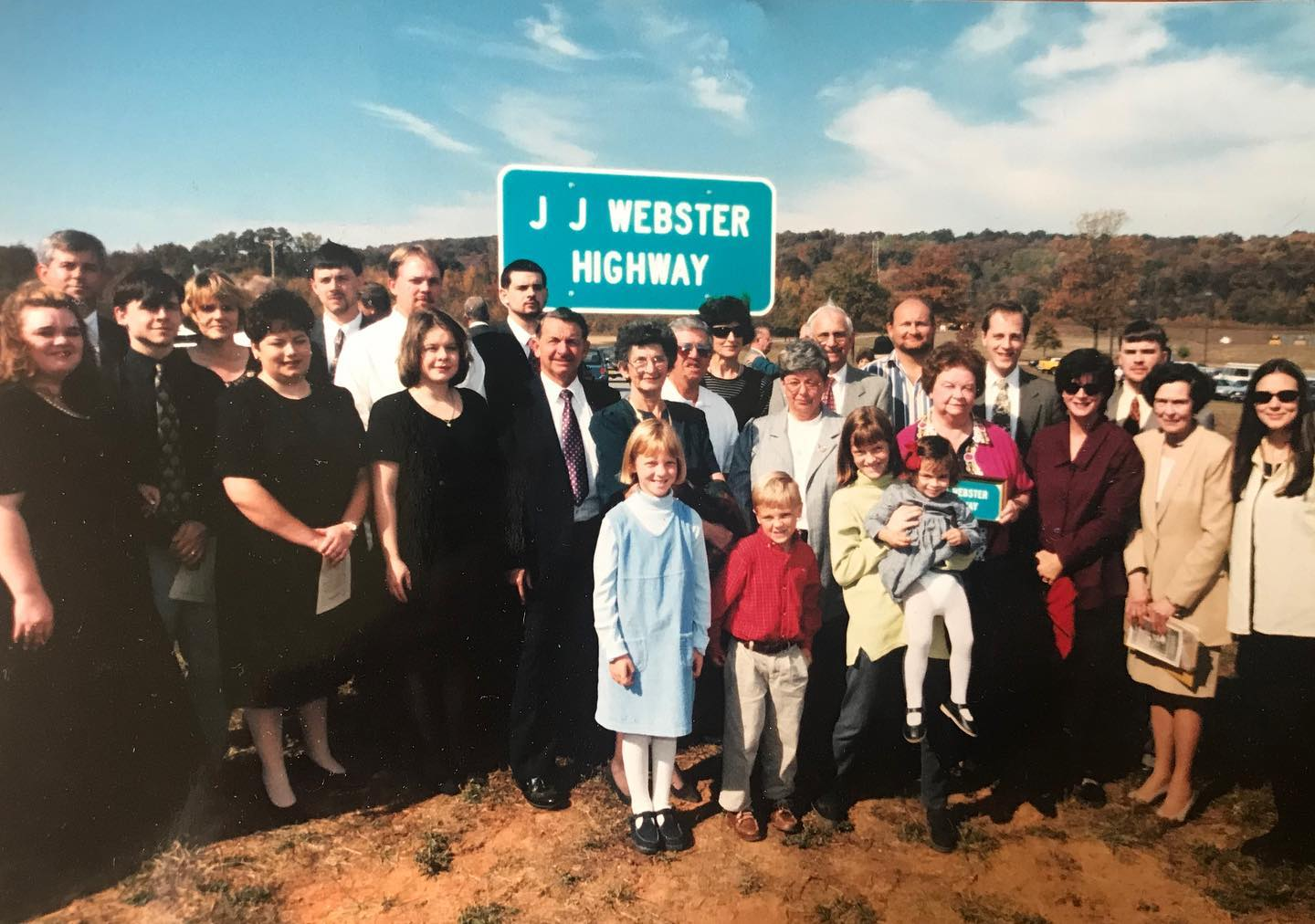
Webster (second from right) at the dedication ceremony of J.J. Webster Highway in 1998

In 1995, Webster was elected as First Vice Chair of the Rockingham County Democratic Party Executive Committee. She was also a registrar in five presidential elections.

Webster was a friend of First Lady Rosalynn Carter and was personally thanked by Lady Bird Johnson for her contributions to the Democratic Party. Webster met President Bill Clinton when he flew into Rockingham County NC Shiloh Airport to campaign in North Carolina.

== Personal life ==
She married James Jefferson Webster II, a son of Rockingham County Commissioner J.J. Webster. They had two children, June Webster and James Jefferson Webster III. They lived in Stoneville, North Carolina.

== Later life and death ==
Webster was a parishioner at Centenary United Methodist Church, where she taught adult Sunday school classes, served as a lay leader, and performed as a member of the church choir.

Webster died on July 4, 2008, at Moses H. Cone Memorial Hospital in Greensboro, North Carolina. Her funeral was held on July 7, 2008, at Centenary United Methodist Church. She was buried in the Webster family plot in Centenary's cemetery.
