= James Jefferson =

James Jefferson may refer to:

- James Jefferson (gridiron football), American and Canadian football player
- James Jefferson, of The MOD Squad

== See also ==
- James Jefferson Webster, American politician, businessman, and farmer
- James Jefferson Webster III, American checkers player
