= Patricia Wright Gwyn =

American politician (1929–2018)

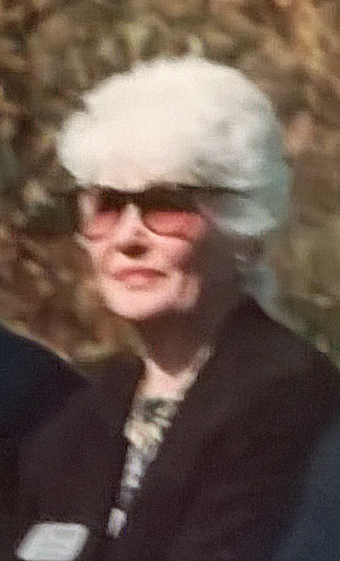
- Gwyn in 1998.

Chairwoman of the Rockingham County Board of Commissioners
- In office 1999–2000

Rockingham County Commissioner
- In office 1996–2000

First Lady of Reidsville
- Assumed Role; 1960–1966
- Mayor: Julius J. Gwyn

Personal details
- Born: Patricia Hamilton Wright; April 1, 1929 Montreal, Quebec, Canada
- Died: October 16, 2018 (aged 89) Greensboro, North Carolina, U.S.
- Spouse: Julius J. Gwyn
- Education: Spence School; Walnut Hill School
- Alma mater: Duke University (BA); University of North Carolina at Greensboro (MLS)
- Occupation: librarian, teacher, politician

Patricia Hamilton Wright Gwyn (April 1, 1929 – October 16, 2018) was a Canadian-born American politician, educator, and librarian. She served as a Rockingham County commissioner from 1996 to 2000, and was the first woman chair of the Rockingham County Commission. Prior to her time as a commissioner, she served as director of Rockingham County Public Libraries.

== Early life and education ==
Gwyn was born Patricia Hamilton Wright on April 1, 1929 in Montreal. She was the daughter of Willard Wyldre Wright and Dorothy Thomas Wright. She attended Spence School in New York City and graduated from Walnut Hill School in Natick, Massachusetts in 1947.

She studied at Duke University, graduating in 1951 with a degree in English. Gwyn went on to earn a master's degree in library science from the University of North Carolina at Greensboro.

== Career ==
=== Education ===
Gwyn worked as a kindergarten teacher for seven years before becoming the director of the First Presbyterian Church Child Development Center in Reidsville, North Carolina. Gwyn later transitioned from education to a career in library science, working in the Rockingham County Public Library system for twenty-two years, starting as a book mobile librarian and retiring as the director of county libraries.

=== Politics and public life ===
From 1960 to 1966, Gwyn served as First Lady of Reidsville while her husband was mayor. Under her husband's administration the city racially integrated.

She was elected to the Rockingham County Board of Commissioners in 1996 and served as a commissioner until 2000. On October 28, 1998, she attended a ceremony at Dalton L. McMichael High School for the dedication of North Carolina Highway 135 being designated as the J.J. Webster Highway, after former Rockingham County Commissioner James Jefferson Webster. In 1999, she became the first woman Chair of the Rockingham County Commission.

She was active in the Race Relations Council, Downtown Reidsville Corporation, the Rotary Club, Habitat for Humanity, the YMCA, and the Triad Council of Government Consortium.

== Personal life ==
On April 1, 1950, her engagement to Julius Johnston Gwyn, a fellow Duke student who was business manager of the Duke Chronicle and a member of the Order of the Red Friars, was announced. He was the son of Judge Allen Hatchett Gwyn, a former state senator and justice of the superior court. They married in Waban, Massachusetts in June 1950. She and her husband had three children. They moved to Reidsville, North Carolina after her husband graduated from law school.

She died from Parkinson's disease on October 16, 2018 in Greensboro, North Carolina.
