= Beth Mitchell =

American shag dancer (1972-1998)

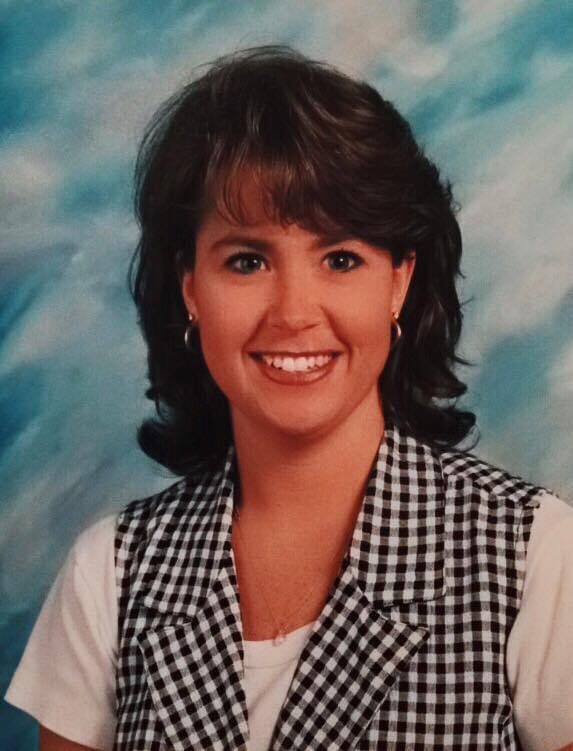
- Mitchell in 1997
- Born: Elizabeth Webster Mitchell; October 7, 1972; Greensboro, North Carolina
- Died: March 20, 1998 (aged 25); Stoneville, North Carolina
- Resting place: Stoneville Municipal Cemetery
- Education: Dalton L. McMichael High School
- Alma mater: University of North Carolina at Greensboro
- Occupations: Teacher, dancer
- Relatives: J.J. Webster (great-grandfather); John Ray Webster (granduncle); Jeff Webster (cousin)

Elizabeth Webster Mitchell (October 7, 1972 – March 20, 1998) was an American educator and competitive shag dancer. In 1998 she won the National Shag Dance Championship in Myrtle Beach, South Carolina. Mitchell was killed during the 1998 Gainesville–Stoneville tornado outbreak a week after she won the championship. She was posthumously inducted into the Beach Shaggers National Hall of Fame's Keepers Of The Dance in 2002.

== Early life and family ==
Mitchell was born on October 7, 1972, in Greensboro, North Carolina, to Worth Mitchell and Nancy Lee King. She was a great-granddaughter of the politician and businessman James Jefferson Webster, a grandniece of Captain John Ray Webster, and a cousin of checkers player Jeff Webster. Through her mother she is descended from Scottish emigrants George Irving and Jane McDonald, who came to the United States in 1834 from Closeburn, Dumfriesshire aboard the Hector. She descended maternally from the Robertson family, a colonial Virginian family, through her great-great grandmother Margaret Hurt Robertson. Through her Robertson ancestry, she was also a relative of mathematician Ione Grogan.

== Education and dance training ==
Mitchell began dancing Carolina shag, a form of swing dance, when she was nine years old. As a teenager she became a competitive shag dancer and, at the age of fifteen, she joined the National Shaggers Association. Mitchell attended Dalton L. McMichael High School, where she was a member of the cheerleading squad. In 1990 she made the All-Star Cheerleading Squad for the 42nd Annual East-West All-Star Games in Greensboro. After high school, Mitchell earned a bachelor's degree in elementary education from the University of North Carolina at Greensboro, where she was a member of Alpha Chi Omega.

== Career ==
Upon graduating from college, Mitchell worked as a second grade teacher at Stoneville Elementary School in Stoneville, North Carolina. She continued to compete in the non-professional shag circuit, including in two national championships. Mitchell was the Non-Pro Champion of the National Shag Dancing Championship. She and her dance partner, Brad Kinard, won the championship in Myrtle Beach, South Carolina, in 1998.

== Death ==
Portrait of the Madonna, donated in memory of Mitchell, at Centenary United Methodist Church in Stoneville

Mitchell died on March 20, 1998, a week after she won the National Shag Dancing Championship. She and her mother were driving in their car when an F3 tornado hit Stoneville. Their car was thrown against the Claybrook Tire Shop as the building collapsed. Mitchell's mother was taken to the hospital in critical condition. Mitchell died on the scene from the impact. She was one of two people in Stoneville killed during the 1998 Gainesville-Stoneville tornado outbreak.

Mitchell is buried at Stoneville Municipal Cemetery.

== Legacy ==
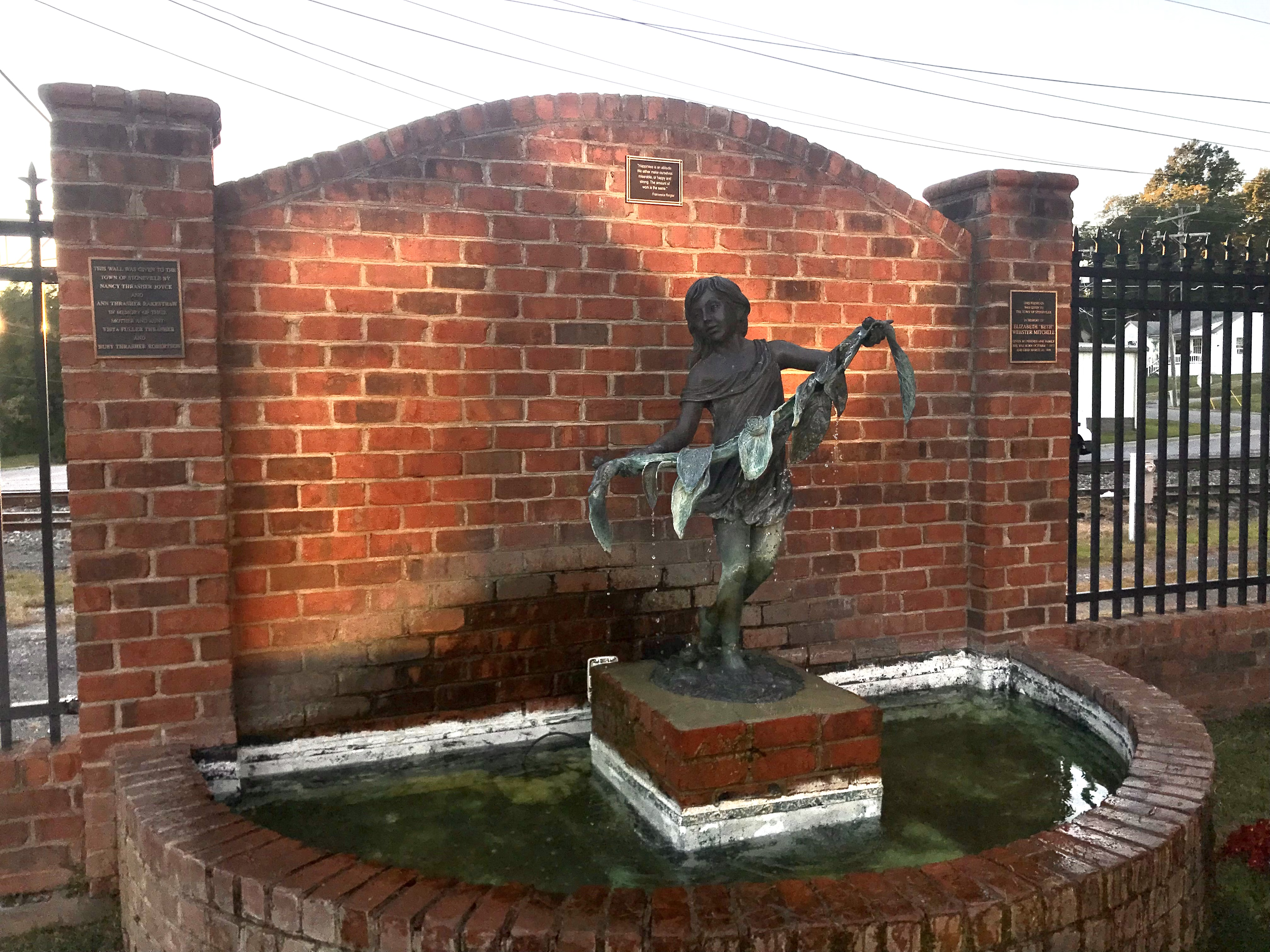
Friendship Park fountain that is a memorial to Mitchell

After her death, the Beth Mitchell Memorial Scholarship was founded. The scholarship, organized through the National Shag Dance Championships, is awarded to National Shag Dance contestants who are planning to attend college. A dance competition named after her, the Beth Mitchell Memorial Shag Dance Competition, is held annually in Greensboro.

Friendship Park in downtown Stoneville was built as a memorial to Mitchell and Powell Hickman, a local farmer who was also killed by the 1998 tornado.

In 2002 she was added to the Beach Shaggers National Hall of Fame's Keepers Of The Dance. She is also listed in Shag Atlanta's memorial.
