= John Ray Webster =

American checkers grandmaster (born 1942)

Captain John Ray Webster
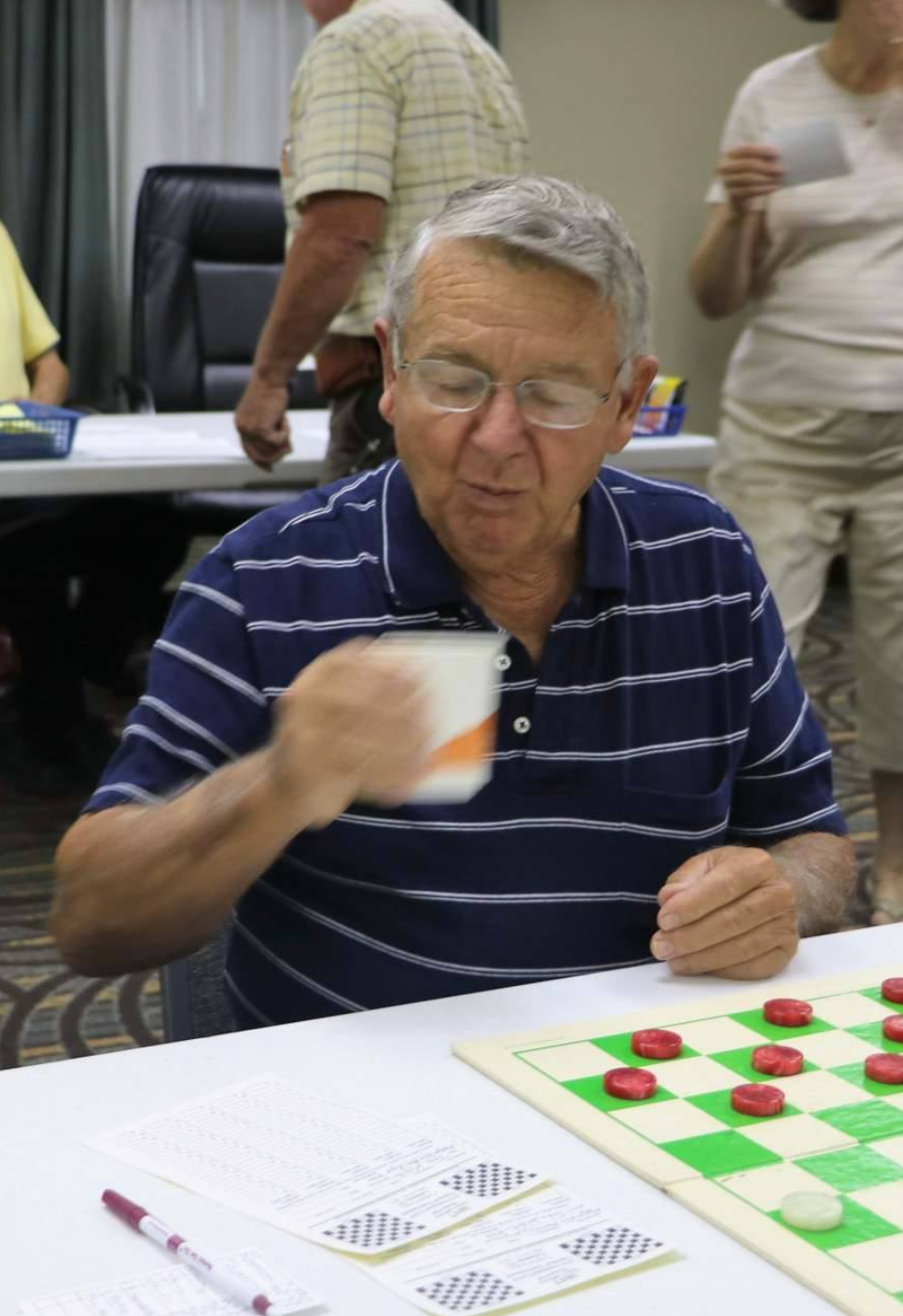
- Webster in 2017

Personal details
- Born: March 31, 1942 (age 84) Stoneville, Rockingham County; North Carolina, United States
- Parent(s): James Jefferson Webster (father); Nannie Hurt Strong (mother)
- Relatives: Jeff Webster (nephew); Beth Mitchell (grandniece)
- Education: Stoneville High School
- Alma mater: North Carolina State University; Oklahoma State University–Stillwater
- Occupation: Checkers player, military officer, veterinarian, farmer, musician

Military service
- Allegiance: United States
- Branch/service: United States Army
- Rank: Captain

Captain John Ray Webster (born March 31, 1942) is an American competitive checkers player, veterinarian, farmer, retired military officer, and musician. A national checkers champion and grandmaster, Webster won the United States Blitz GAYP title at the American Checker Federation National Championship in 2011. He has won the North Carolina Checkers Championship eleven times and represented the United States, as a member of the United States International Checkers Team, in the World Checkers/Draughts Championship in England in 1989 and Las Vegas in 2005. In 2011 he represented the United States at the World Qualifier Checkers Tournament in Italy.

== Early life and family ==
Webster was born on March 31, 1942, in Stoneville, North Carolina, the youngest of five children, to James Jefferson Webster and Nannie Hurt Strong. His father was a local farmer, businessman, and politician who served as the county commissioner for Rockingham County. Through his mother he is descended from Scottish emigrants George Irving and Jane McDonald, who came to the United States in 1834 from Closeburn, Dumfriesshire aboard the Hector. His maternal grandparents, Margaret May Irving and James Robert Strong, inherited a large tobacco farm along the Dan River from Irving's parents, Walter Scott Irving and Margaret Hurt Robertson, a member of a Virginian colonial family. Through his mother, he is related to the mathematician Ione Grogan. The last post office for the former community of Waddell, North Carolina was operated out of the east room of the Irving farmhouse. Webster's parents later owned the farm.

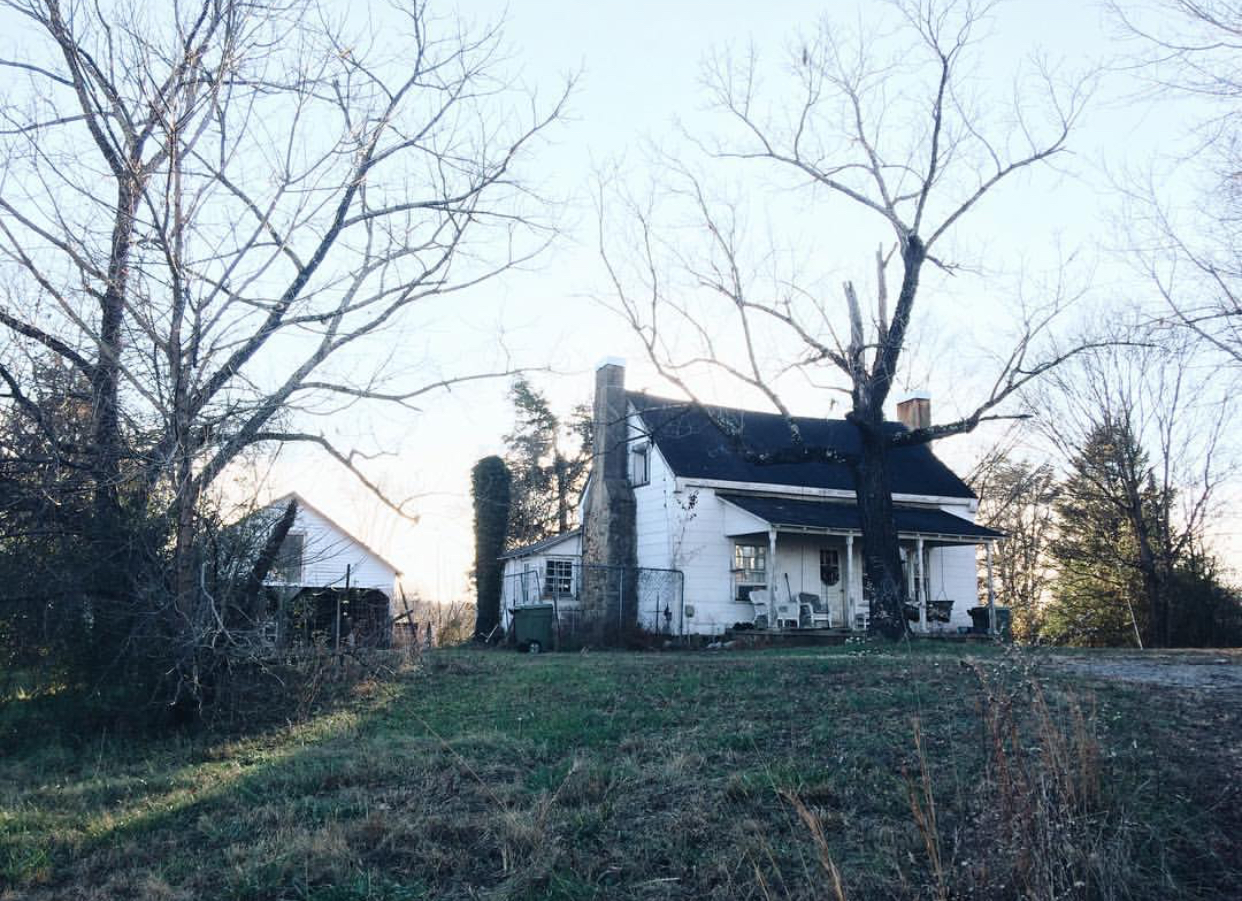
The Walter Scott Irving House on the Webster family farm.

== Education and career ==
Webster attended North Carolina State University as an undergraduate student and obtained a doctorate in veterinary medicine from Oklahoma State University-Stillwater. He works as a veterinarian in Rockingham County, specializing in livestock. He served in the United States Army with the rank of captain.

Webster lives in Stoneville. He is a musician, playing the bass fiddle with the Green House River Band, a bluegrass band that performs in North Carolina and Virginia. Webster manages his family's farm, now a cattle farm, which he and his siblings inherited from their father.

=== Checkers career ===
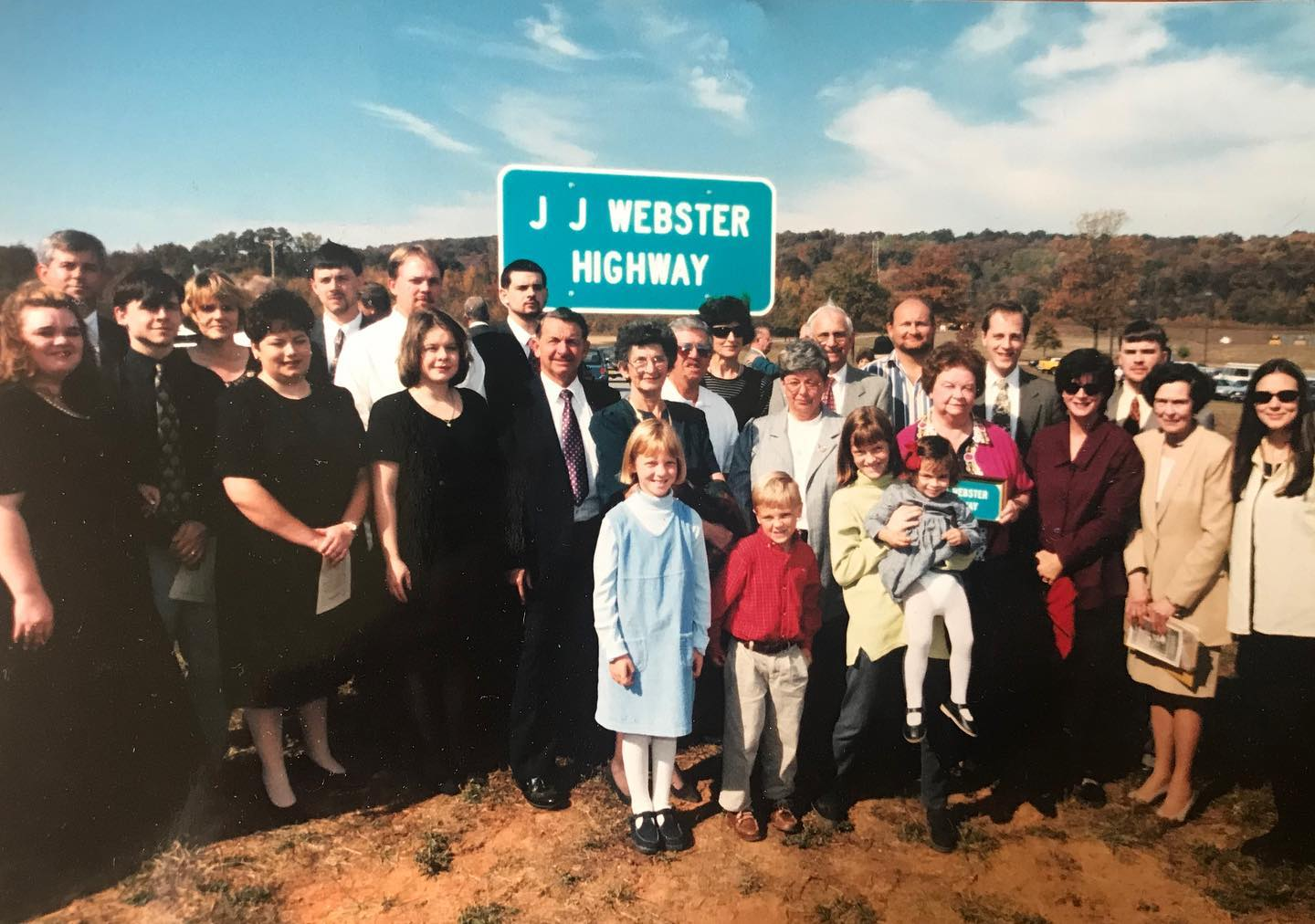
Webster (first left from center) at the dedication ceremony of J. J. Webster Highway in 1998

A competitive checkers player, Webster won the United States Blitz Go-As-You-Please Championship at the American Checker Federation National Championship in Medina, Ohio on July 25, 2011. He also won the North Carolina State Checkers Open in Greensboro, North Carolina on May 18, 2011, and the Southern Open in Lebanon, Tennessee on July 10, 2011. He was a silver medalist at the West Tennessee Strawberry Festival Open on 7 May 2011 in Humboldt, Tennessee. In October 2011 he competed in San Remo, Italy at the World Qualifier Checkers Tournament. Webster began playing checkers when he was ten years old at country general stores. He traveled to play in Reidsville, Danville, Draper, Burlington, and Winston-Salem through the YMCA's Chess & Checkers Association. His first North Carolina State tournament, when he was sixteen years old, was in Hickory in 1958. He has won the North Carolina checkers championship eleven times. He also acted as an early checkers mentor for his nephew and competitive checkers player, Jeff.

In 2005 he placed seventh at the Tennessee State Championships. In 2007 he won the U.S. GAYP National Championship in Las Vegas. He was a member of the United States International Checkers Team four times, playing in the United States vs. United Kingdom and Ireland international matches. Webster was a top player in two international matches, at Weston-Super-Mare in England in 1989 and again in Las Vegas in 2005. In September 2014 Webster competed at the 97th Annual Virginia State Checkers Tournament in Bedford.

In 2015 Webster won the Tennessee State Open in Lebanon, Tennessee.

The John Webster GAYP Tournament, hosted by the American Checkers Federation, is named in honor of Webster.
