= Settle's Bridge =

Bridge in Rockingham County, North Carolina

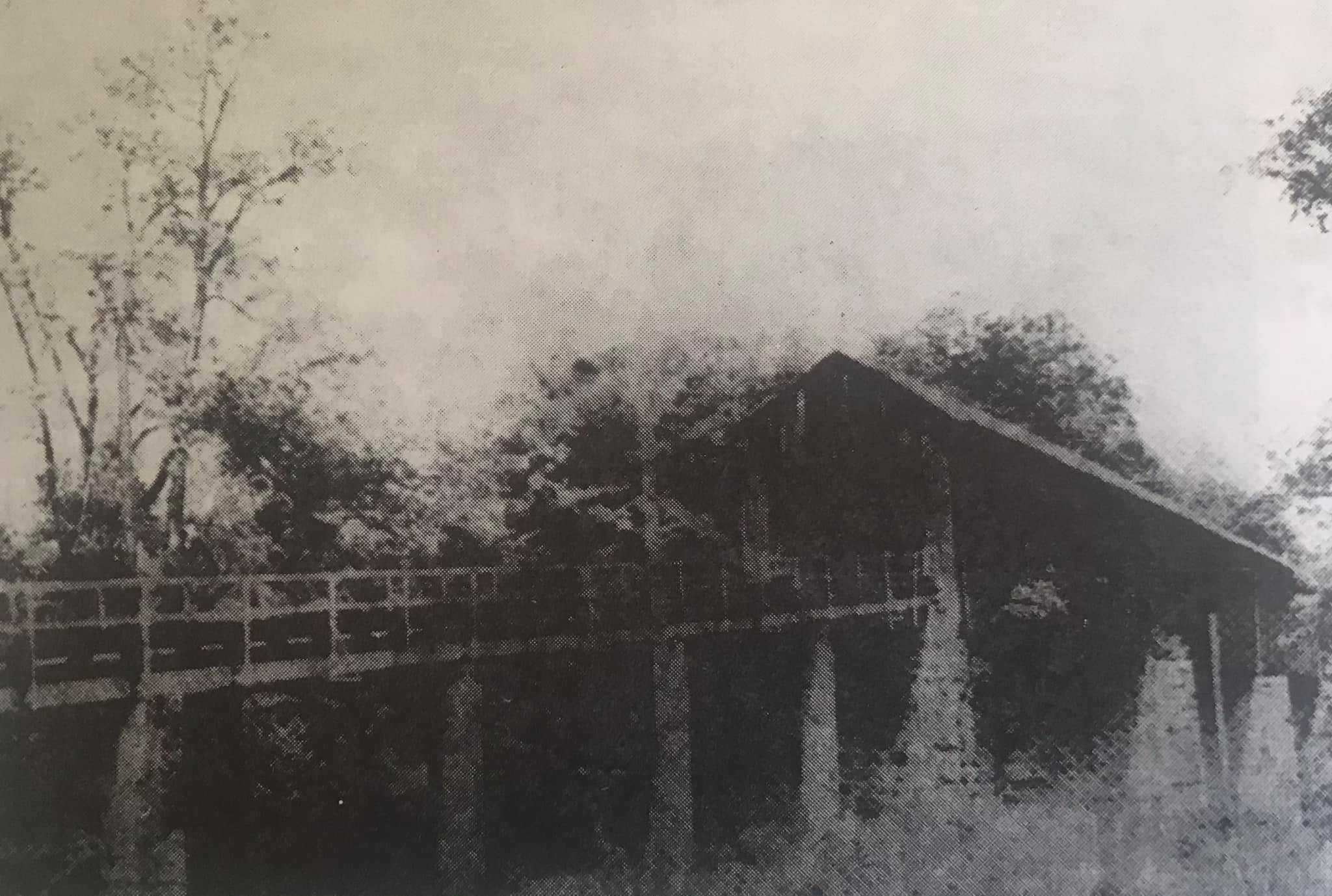
- The original covered bridge
- Carries: Automobiles
- Crosses: Dan River
- Locale: Rockingham County, North Carolina, U.S.
- Named for: Thomas Settle

Settle's Bridge is a bridge in Rockingham County, North Carolina. The bridge crosses over the Dan River in between the towns of Stoneville and Wentworth. Prior to the original bridge's demolition in 1953, it was one of the last covered bridges in North Carolina. A modern concrete bridge, known as Settle Memorial Bridge, was later built near the original location.

== History ==
Settle's Bridge, crossing the Dan River on Settles Bridge Road, north of Wentworth, North Carolina, was one of three covered bridges in Rockingham County, North Carolina It was built in the 19th century by Judge Thomas Settle near his Mulberry Island Plantation and along the tobacco farm of Walter Scott Irving. The bridge developed a reputation for being haunted after a foiled assassination attempt took place there. In the 1920s, the county commissioners voted to appropriate $250,000 to pave a road from Madison to Settle's Bridge. County Commissioner J. J. Webster used his position to ensure that Settle Bridge Road was paved. The wooden bridge was demolished in 1953.

== Works cited ==
- Richman, Barak D. (2007). "The King of Rockingham County and the Original Bridge to Nowhere". Contracts Stories. Foundation Press. ISBN 9781587787218.
