= Bill Crews =

Bill Crews may refer to:

- Bill Crews (politician)
- Bill Crews (minister)
- Bill Crews (mayor)
