= William Edward Crews =

American politician (1932–2024)

Mayor of Stoneville, North Carolina

Personal details
- Born: May 19, 1932 Pitt County, North Carolina, U.S.
- Died: April 24, 2024 (aged 91) Rockingham County, North Carolina, U.S.
- Resting place: Stoneville Cemetery
- Party: Democratic Party
- Spouse: Nellie Gray Taylor
- Children: 2

William Edward Crews (May 19, 1932 – April 24, 2024) was an American politician. He served as mayor of Stoneville, North Carolina for twenty-two years.

== Early life ==
Crews was born in Pitt County, North Carolina on May 19, 1932, to Marvin Staples "Jack" Crews and Clarreen Neville Crews. He was one of fifteen children and grew up on a dairy farm before the family settled in Shiloh, Rockingham County, North Carolina.

== Career ==
Crews, a Democrat, ran for mayor of Stoneville, North Carolina in 1959. He was advised on his campaign by Rockingham County Commissioner J. J. Webster, and later proposed that the North Carolina Department of Transportation name North Carolina Highway 135 after Webster. Crews served as mayor for twenty-two consecutive years.

He was a trustee of the Holland Estate, which bequeathed $1.2 million to the town of Stoneville.

== Personal life and death ==
Crews was a parishioner at First Baptist Church of Mayodan, North Carolina, where he served as a deacon, Sunday School teacher, choir member, and youth leader.

Crews was married to Nellie Gray Taylor, with whom he had two children.

He died on April 24, 2024. His funeral was held at First Baptist Church of Mayodan on April 30, 2024, followed by an interment in Stoneville Cemetery.
