= 1903 Gainesville tornado =

Tornado which struck Gainesville on 1 June 1903

Meteorological history
- Formed: June 1, 1903, 12:45 p.m. EST (UTC−05:00)
- Dissipated: June 1, 1903, 12:47 p.m. EST (UTC−05:00)
- Duration: ≤2 minutes

F4 tornado
- on the Fujita scale
- Path length: 4 mi (6.4 km)

Overall effects
- Fatalities: 98+
- Injuries: 180+
- Damage: $1,000,000 (1903 USD) $35.8 million (2025 USD)
- Areas affected: Gainesville, Georgia, United States

On Monday, June 1, 1903, an extremely short lived but violent and catastrophic tornado struck the city of Gainesville, Georgia, killing at least 98 people and injuring 180 or more. The tornado is retrospectively estimated to have been an F4 on the modern-day Fujita scale. (Note: The Fujita scale was devised under the aegis of scientist T. Theodore Fujita in the early 1970s. Prior to the advent of the scale in 1971, tornadoes in the United States were officially unrated. While the Fujita scale has been superseded by the Enhanced Fujita scale in the U.S. since February 1, 2007, Canada used the old scale until April 1, 2013; nations elsewhere, like the United Kingdom, apply other classifications such as the TORRO scale.) The tornado, which was of very brief duration relative to its intensity, lasted approximately two minutes, and struck a trail roughly 4 mi (6.4 km) long. According to tornado researcher Thomas P. Grazulis, the Gainesville tornado was one of the shortest-tracked F4 tornadoes on record. It skirted the south of the city, starting in the southwest and proceeding northeast, passing through a natural depression roughly 100 ft (30 m) lower than the city itself. The area, which included cotton mills, reported about 50 deaths and incurred the worst damage; in this area the intensity of the damage was equivalent to low-end F4 status. Unlike a similar event in 1936, the 1903 tornado missed downtown Gainesville.

The tornado, initially appearing along the train track, was at first thought to be smoke from a train. It struck a cotton mill at 12:45 p.m. local standard time, ripping off the top floor where a number of children were working, many of them numbering among the fatalities. The power of the tornado ripped an iron cupola from an approximately 40-foot-wide (12 m) standpipe, crushing a number of people when it fell down. The tornado also damaged the Gainesville Iron Works and track, signals and freight cars of the Southern Railway Company, before destroying approximately 70 of the 120 workers' cottages at the Pacolet Mills in New Holland, where young children and elderly were located at the time. In total, at least 98—and possibly as many as 104—people were killed and at least 180 injured, with some reports indicating up to 190 injuries. The number of people harmed was reduced due to many workers attending picnics away from the site when the tornado struck.

Almost 33 years later, on April 6, 1936, another violent tornado struck Gainesville, claiming at least 203 lives. Gainesville is the only town of its size to be so devastated twice by tornadoes in its history.

== See also ==
- 1936 Tupelo–Gainesville tornado outbreak — Produced another catastrophic F4 tornado in the same city
- 1998 Gainesville–Stoneville tornado outbreak

== Sources ==
- Grazulis, Thomas P. (May 1984). Violent Tornado Climatography, 1880–1982. OSTI (Technical report). NUREG. Washington, D.C.: Nuclear Regulatory Commission. OSTI 7099491. CR-3670.
- Grazulis, Thomas P. (November 1990). Significant Tornadoes 1880–1989. Vol. 2. St. Johnsbury, Vermont: The Tornado Project of Environmental Films. ISBN 1-879362-02-3.
- Grazulis, Thomas P. (July 1993). Significant Tornadoes 1680–1991: A Chronology and Analysis of Events. St. Johnsbury, Vermont: The Tornado Project of Environmental Films. ISBN 1-879362-03-1.
- Grazulis, Thomas P. (2001a). The Tornado: Nature's Ultimate Windstorm. Norman: University of Oklahoma Press. ISBN 978-0-8061-3538-0.
- Grazulis, Thomas P. (2001b). F5-F6 Tornadoes. St. Johnsbury, Vermont: The Tornado Project of Environmental Films.
