= 1998 Gainesville–Stoneville tornado outbreak =

Weather event in the United States

1998 Gainesville-Stoneville tornado outbreak
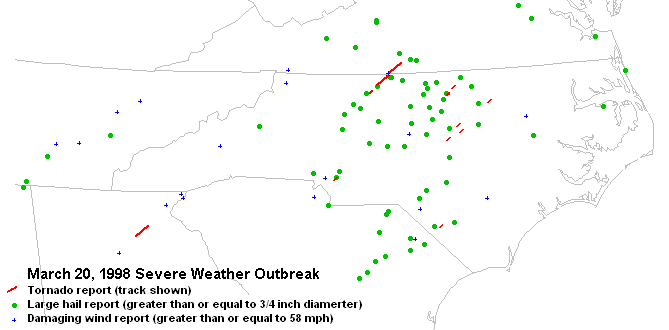
- Survey of all storm reports during the 3-20-98 severe weather outbreak

Meteorological history
- Date: March 20, 1998

Tornado outbreak
- Tornadoes: 12
- Max. rating: F3 tornado
- Duration: 14 hours, 20 minutes

Overall effects
- Casualties: 14 fatalities, 205 injuries
- Damage: $56.5 million
- Areas affected: Georgia, North Carolina, Virginia

A deadly tornado outbreak struck portions of the southeastern United States on March 20, 1998. Particularly hard hit were rural areas outside of Gainesville, Georgia, where at least 12 people were killed in an early morning F3 tornado. The entire outbreak killed 14 people and produced 12 tornadoes across three states with the town of Stoneville, North Carolina, being also hard hit by the storms.

== Meteorological synopsis ==
Prior to March 20, several days of severe weather dumped heavy amounts of rain in the Southeast, particularly in North Carolina. On the day of the severe weather outbreak, temperatures were in the 40s across the Appalachian Mountains and the North Carolina Piedmont region, while temperatures in the 60s and 70s further south creating a sharp contrast between air masses across the Southeast.

A strong storm cell moved across northern Georgia during the early morning hours. This supercell produced the Gainesville area tornado, before producing scattered reports of large hail and high wind damage farther northeast in Appalachian North Carolina. As this first bout of severe weather slowly dissipated, a line of storms rapidly developed east of the mountains over the western Carolinas during the early afternoon. Moving into a warmer environment where CAPE values were high (over 1000 j/kg), the line of storms evolved into several supercells, including two particularly prolific storms that moved across central and northern North Carolina from Charlotte to the Virginia border.

== Confirmed tornadoes ==
Confirmed tornadoes by Fujita rating
FU	F0	F1	F2	F3	F4	F5	Total
0	3	4	3	2	0	0	12

F#	Location	County	Time (UTC)	Path length	Damage
Georgia
F3	S of Murrayville to SE of Cleveland	Hall, White	1125	13 miles (20.8 km)	12 deaths - See section on this tornado – 171 people were injured.
North Carolina
F0	Mint Hill (East Charlotte)	Mecklenburg	1942	0.1 miles (0.16 km)	Damage to trees and power lines occurred. 2-inch (0.051 m) hail fell in Mint Hill, where twin rope funnels were reported by an eyewitness.
F1	N of Pine Hall	Stokes	2014	1.5 miles (2.4 km)	Several mobile homes, a house, and a church were damaged, and trees were downed. Three people were injured.
F3	SW of Mayodan to NW of Eden	Rockingham	2025	12 miles (19.2 km)	2 deaths - See section on this tornado – 27 people were injured.
F0	SW of Holly Springs	Wake	2315	0.1 miles (0.16 km)	One home sustained minor damage. Home video of the storm showed a rotating wall cloud containing several vortices, of which only one briefly touched down.
F2	SE of Moriah	Durham	2330	2.5 miles (4 km)	Caused damage to farm sheds, homes, and businesses. One person was injured.
F2	Garner	Wake	2340	1.5 miles (2.4 km)	A church was damaged, and numerous trees were snapped and uprooted. Two people were injured.
F0	Raleigh	Wake	2345	0.2 miles (0.32 km)	A tornado caused damage to a business, two sheds, five greenhouses, and several cars (some of which were overturned).
F2	E of Berea	Granville	2355	1.5 miles (2.4 km)	Caused damage to a ranch house, a farm house, and outbuildings. Barns were destroyed as well.
F1	NW of Castalia	Franklin	0035	0.1 miles (0.16 km)	Six houses and a mobile home were damaged.
F1	NE of Proctorville	Robeson	0145	0.5 miles (0.8 km)	A mobile home was slightly pushed off its foundation. One person was injured and large hail was also reported. One person was injured.
Virginia
F1	W of Sandy Level to NW of Whitmill	Henry, Pittsylvania	2056	13 miles (20.8 km)	A total of 60 residences, barns, outbuildings, vehicles and two churches were damaged or destroyed. Damage path up to 350 yards in width.
Source: Tornado History Project - March 20, 1998 Storm Data

=== Gainesville, Georgia ===
Gainesville, Georgia
F3 tornado
- on the Fujita scale

Overall effects
- Casualties: 12 fatalities, 171 injuries
- Damage: $20 million (1998 USD)

Touching down at around 6:25 AM EST in northwestern Hall County, this powerful pre-dawn F3 tornado traveled into southern White County, leaving a 13-mile long damage path through rural areas outside of Gainesville, Georgia, before dissipating at around 6:40 EST. It heavily damaged Lanier Elementary School and unroofed North Hall High School, while damaging or destroying several businesses. The school system did not fully recover until the next fall. At North Hall, the gymnasium was used as a temporary classroom until the end of the school year, while students at Lanier were temporarily relocated in three other area schools that were not affected by the tornado. About 40 homes were completely destroyed and another 130 were damaged to varying degrees. 45 mobile homes were also damaged or destroyed, with 11 of the fatalities who were inside those structures. The other fatality occurred when a tractor-trailer was carried by the funnel and slammed into a school bus, killing the driver. Eight chicken houses were also destroyed and about 100,000 chickens were killed. 40 cattle were also killed by the storm. In addition to the 12 fatalities, over 150 people were injured. A police officer was also killed after being hit by a car while assisting a motorist who was involved in an accident during the storm. The fatality was not directly attributed to the tornado itself. Since recordkeeping began, this storm stands as the second deadliest Georgia tornado since 1950 and the deadliest since an F4 killed 18 on April 30, 1953, south of Macon. The damage figures were estimated at between $15 million and $20 million with the majority of the damage in Hall County.

The immediate Gainesville area is no stranger to deadly tornadoes. It was the site of the fifth deadliest tornado in United States history on April 6, 1936, during the Tupelo-Gainesville tornado outbreak, where two tornadoes merged into a very large F4 killing 203 including 70 at the Cooper Pants Factory. The tornado occurred only 12 hours after an F5 struck Tupelo, Mississippi, killing at least 216 (with others being unaccounted for), making it the fourth deadliest tornado on record including storms before 1950. Another tornado hit Gainesville in 1903 killing at least 100.

The 1998 season, an El Niño year, had several deadly tornado outbreaks in addition to the Gainesville tornado including the Kissimmee Tornado Outbreak in Florida on February 23, the Birmingham, Alabama tornado on April 8, the Mississippi and Tennessee Valley outbreak on April 16 and the Spencer, South Dakota/Eastern tornado outbreak and derecho on May 30–31.

=== Stoneville, North Carolina ===
Stoneville, North Carolina
F3 tornado
- on the Fujita scale

Overall effects
- Casualties: 2 fatalities, 27 injuries
- Damage: $34 million (1998 USD)

At about 3:25 PM an F3 tornado developed about one mile southwest of Mayodan in Rockingham County, North Carolina, touching down in an open field near the Western Rockingham Middle School. The tornado then almost immediately struck Unifi Plant No. 5, a textile manufacturing complex, tearing the roof and wall off of one of its buildings. The tornado proceeded to destroy several homes, cause extensive damage to the West Side Baptist Church, and strike an apartment complex and an abandoned elementary school. Over 190 residences in Mayodan were damaged by the storm.

The tornado proceeded past Mayodan, crossing the Mayo River and traveling several miles across forests and farmland. Between Mayodan and U.S. Route 220 it struck the home of farmer Powell Hickman, throwing him from his residence and killing him. At about 3:30 the tornado entered the town of Stoneville, North Carolina, traveling north along a rail line into the main business district along Henry Street. It caused extensive damage to commercial structures. Beth Mitchell, a national champion shag dancer, died when her car was thrown into a repair garage. At 3:49 the tornado, after traveling 12 miles, dissipated about three miles northwest of the town of Eden.

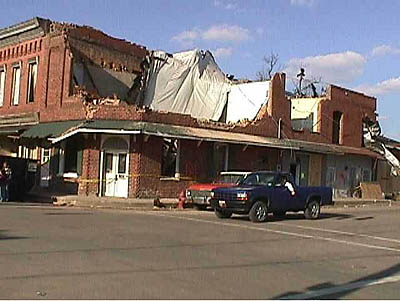
Damage from the tornado on East Main Street in downtown Stoneville

A total of 500 to 600 residences were affected by the tornado, along with numerous businesses; while several vehicles (including a fire truck) were also tossed some distance. Canceled checks from Stoneville were found 53 miles away in Huddleston, Virginia, while other debris was found scattered in and around the Martinsville area. Total casualties amounted to two dead and 27 injured. The tornado was the strongest on-record to have ever struck Rockingham County.

== See also ==
- Tupelo-Gainesville tornado outbreak
- List of North American tornadoes and tornado outbreaks
