= Rockingham County NC Shiloh Airport =

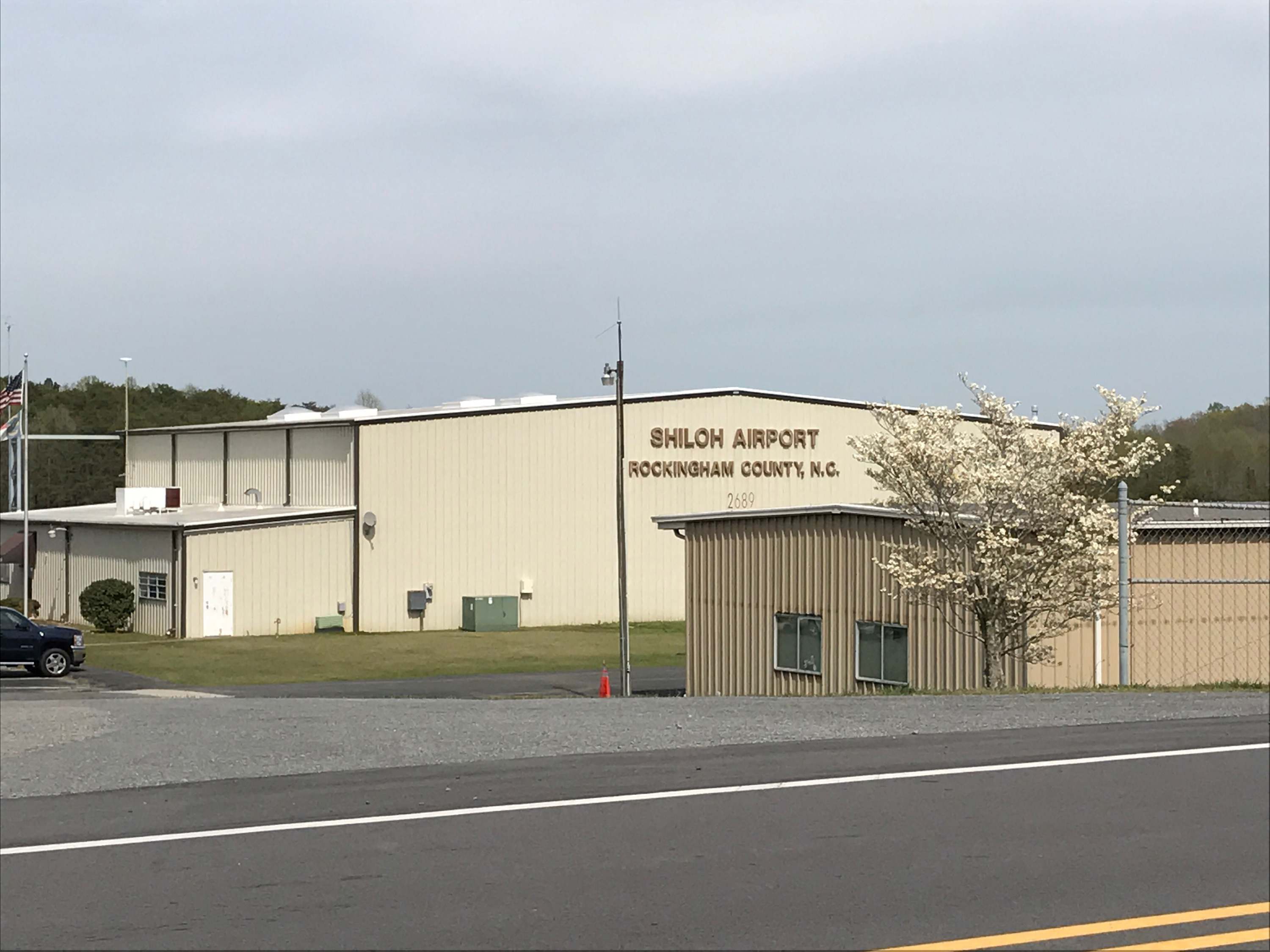
- IATA: none; ICAO: KSIF; FAA LID: SIF

Summary
- Airport type: Public
- Owner: Rockingham County
- Serves: Reidsville, North Carolina
- Location: Stoneville, North Carolina
- Elevation AMSL: 694 ft / 212 m
- Coordinates: 36°26′14″N 079°51′04″W
- Interactive map of Rockingham County NC; Shiloh Airport

Runways
Direction	Length		Surface
Direction	ft	m	Surface
13/31	5,199	1,585	Asphalt

Statistics (2008)
- Aircraft operations: 24,100
- Based aircraft: 66
- Source: Federal Aviation Administration

Rockingham County NC Shiloh Airport (ICAO: KSIF, FAA LID: SIF, formerly 78N) is a county-owned, public-use airport in Rockingham County, North Carolina, United States. It is located off of J.J. Webster Highway in the town of Stoneville, eight nautical miles (15 km) northwest of the central business district of the city of Reidsville It is also known as Rockingham County/NC Shiloh Airport, Rockingham County/Shiloh Airport, or simply as Shiloh Airport.

== History ==
In 1960 community leaders in Rockingham County, North Carolina considered establishing an airport to attract industry and support economic development. The North Carolina General Assembly authorized the county to appoint an airport authority to build and operate an airport, but the county board of commissioners did not appoint anyone to the body until 1965. The authority encountered some difficulty in choosing a site for the strip. Construction began in the community of Shiloh in 1970, and the project was named Shiloh Airport instead of Rockingham Airport to avoid confusion with the city of Rockingham on the other side of the state. Funded by state and federal grants and about $100,000 in donations from local businesses, the airport was finished in 1975.

From its opening, the airport was managed by contracted operators whose profits were derived from the sale of aviation fuel. The airport briefly closed in 1977 after the contracted operator died. A new contractor was found, but struggled to turn a profit since few corporate jets used the facilities, leaving fuel sales low. In 1986 the airport's runway was extended from 3,900 feet to 5,200 feet. By 1995 the airport had a poor reputation among corporate flyers, as the low profits of the contractors forced them to keep staff minimal and fuel stocks low. That year, the airport authority, responding to the complaints about poor service, attempted to sever its contract with the operator at the time, Aerosports of North Carolina Inc. A legal battle ensued, resulting in the contractor leaving but also draining the airport of most of its money. In April 1996, the county commissioners appointed a new airport authority to directly manage the airport and restore its reputation, and later that month the airport hosted its first air show.

== Facilities and aircraft ==
The airport covers an area of 220 acres (89 ha) at an elevation of 694 feet (212 m) above mean sea level. It has one runway designated 13/31 with an asphalt surface measuring 5,199 by 100 feet (1,585 x 30 m). It has several hangars and a single-story terminal building.

For the 12-month period ending July 30, 2008, the airport had 24,100 aircraft operations, an average of 66 per day: 99.6% general aviation and 0.4% military. At that time there were 66 aircraft based at this airport: 88% single-engine and 12% multi-engine.

== See also ==
- List of airports in North Carolina
