= 1936 Tupelo–Gainesville tornado outbreak =

Tornadoes that struck the United States

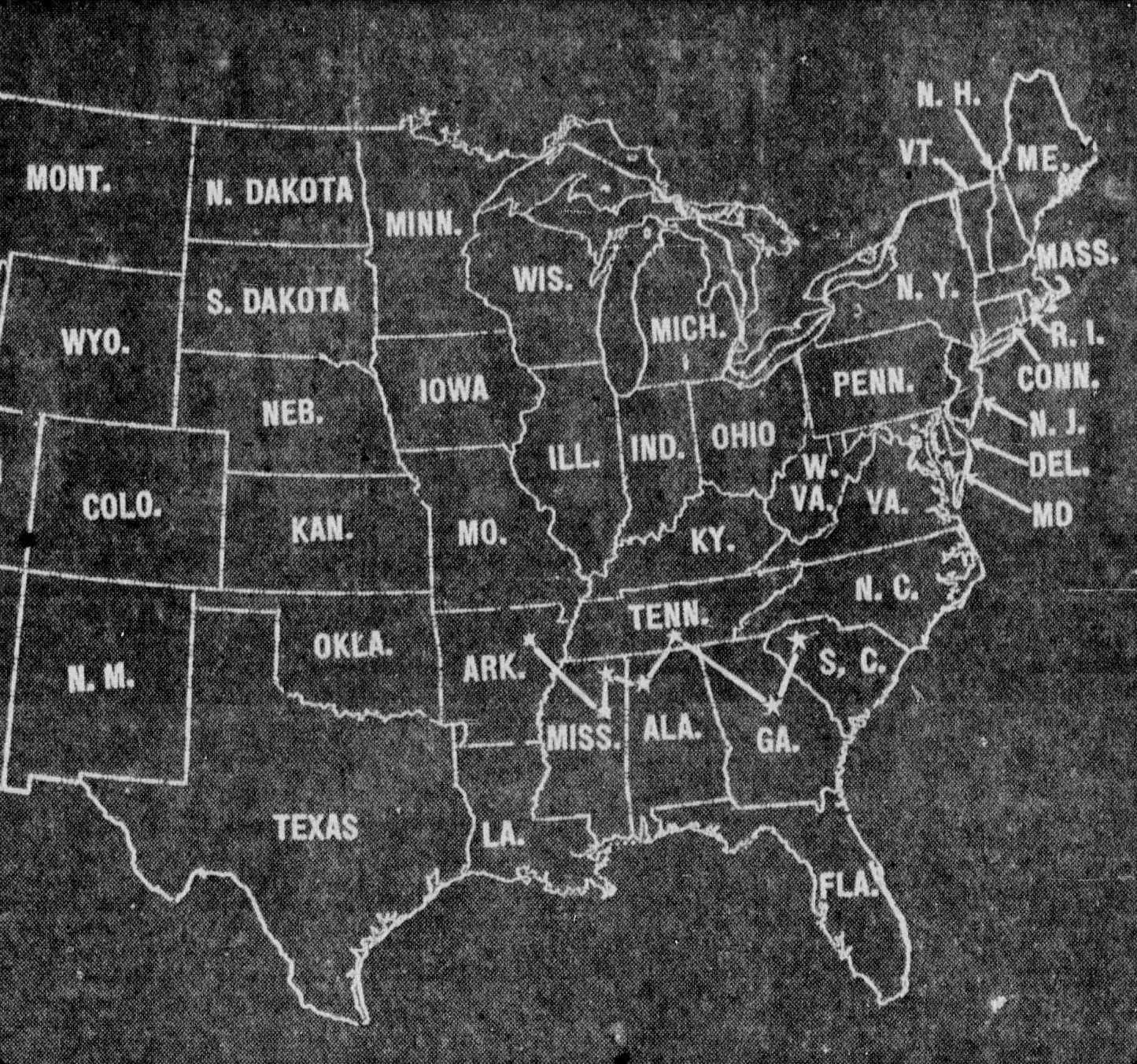
- A map showing where significant tornadoes struck from April 5-6, 1936.

Meteorological history
- Duration: April 5–6, 1936

Tornado outbreak
- Tornadoes: ≥14
- Max. rating: F5 tornado
- Duration: 18 hours

Overall effects
- Fatalities: ≥454
- Injuries: >2,498
- Damage: ≥$15.9 million (1936 USD) ≥$369 million (2025 USD)
- Areas affected: Southern United States

On April 5–6, 1936, an outbreak of at least fourteen tornadoes struck the Southeastern United States, killing at least 454 people (with 419 of those deaths caused by just two tornadoes) and injuring at least 2,500 others. Over two hundred people died in Georgia alone, making it the deadliest disaster ever recorded in the state.

Although the outbreak is often centered on the violent tornadoes in Tupelo, Mississippi (with an estimated F5 rating), and Gainesville, Georgia (estimated F4 rating), there were other destructive tornadoes in the cities of Columbia, Tennessee; Acworth, Georgia; and Anderson, South Carolina. One long-track F4 tornado killed six people in rural parts of Tennessee, and two other long-track tornadoes (rated F3) killed an additional thirteen people in southern Tennessee and northern Alabama. Another pair of F3 tornadoes touched down in Mississippi, claiming an additional eight lives.

This was the second deadliest tornado outbreak in U.S. history (after that of the Tri-state tornado in 1925) and the only one in which two separate tornadoes killed more than 200 people each. (Note: An outbreak is generally defined as a group of at least six tornadoes (the number sometimes varies slightly according to local climatology) with no more than a six-hour gap between individual tornadoes. An outbreak sequence, prior to (after) the start of modern records in 1950, is defined as a period of no more than two (one) consecutive days without at least one significant (F2 or stronger) tornado.) (Note: The Fujita scale was devised under the aegis of scientist T. Theodore Fujita in the early 1970s. Prior to the advent of the scale in 1971, tornadoes in the United States were officially unrated. While the Fujita scale has been superseded by the Enhanced Fujita scale in the U.S. since February 1, 2007, Canada used the old scale until April 1, 2013; nations elsewhere, like the United Kingdom, apply other classifications such as the TORRO scale.) (Note: Historically, the number of tornadoes globally and in the United States was and is likely underrepresented: research by Grazulis on annual tornado activity suggests that, as of 2001, only 53% of yearly U.S. tornadoes were officially recorded. Documentation of tornadoes outside the United States was historically less exhaustive, owing to the lack of monitors in many nations and, in some cases, to internal political controls on public information. Most countries only recorded tornadoes that produced severe damage or loss of life. Significant low biases in U.S. tornado counts likely occurred through the early 1990s, when advanced NEXRAD was first installed and the National Weather Service began comprehensively verifying tornado occurrences.)

== Confirmed tornadoes ==
Confirmed tornadoes by Fujita rating
| FU | F0 | F1 | F2 | F3 | F4 | F5 | Total |
|---|---|---|---|---|---|---|---|
| 1 | ? | ? | 2 | 7 | 3 | 1 | ≥ 14 |

=== April 5 event ===
Confirmed tornadoes – Sunday, April 5, 1936 (Note: All dates are based on the local time zone where the tornado touched down; however, all times are in Coordinated Universal Time and dates are split at midnight CST/CDT for consistency.) (Note: Prior to 1994, only the average widths of tornado paths were officially listed.)
| F# | Location | County / Parish | State | Time (UTC) | Path length | Max. width | Summary |
|---|---|---|---|---|---|---|---|
| F3 | LaCrosse–Larkin | Izard | AR | 01:00–? | 6 mi (9.7 km) | 400 yd (370 m) | 1 death – An intense tornado destroyed a dozen homes approximately 7 miles (11 km) north-northeast of Melbourne. Four or five people were injured, depending on the source, and estimated losses were $40,000 |
| F4 | N of Waynesboro to S of Hohenwald | Hardin, Wayne, Lewis | TN | 01:45–? | 35 mi (56 km) | 300 yd (270 m) | 6 deaths – A violent tornado leveled homes and destroyed other buildings in several communities. The mining village Smith's Branch was obliterated, with four deaths and 27 injuries. Eight other injuries were also reported, for a total of 35, and damages totaled between $150,000 and $200,000. |
| F3 | Northwestern Booneville | Prentiss | MS | 02:05–? | 15 mi (24 km) | 400 yd (370 m) | 4 deaths – This tornado wrecked spacious homes, killing three people in one of them. The tornado also destroyed a number of smaller homes. Twelve people were injured and losses totaled $20,000. |
| F3 | Bryant | Yalobusha | MS | 02:10–? | 18 mi (29 km) | 400 yd (370 m) | 4 deaths – This, the first member of the Tupelo tornado family, touched down south of Coffeeville. It splintered hundreds of pine trees and wrecked five homes. All known fatalities were in one of the homes. Seven people were injured and losses totaled $10,000. |
| F3 | NW of Columbia | Maury | TN | 02:30–? | 5 mi (8.0 km) | 300 yd (270 m) | 5 deaths – An intense tornado leveled hovels and large homes alike in a mining village. A total of approximately 30 homes were destroyed or damaged, with losses estimated at $50,000. 30 injuries occurred. |
| F5 | Northern Tupelo | Lee, Itawamba | MS | 02:55–? | 15 mi (24 km) | 1,000 yd (910 m) | 216+ deaths – See section on this tornado – At least 700 injuries were reported, with damages of up to $3 million. |
| F3 | Red Bay, AL to W of Frankfort, AL | Itawamba (MS), Franklin (AL), Colbert (AL) | MS, AL | 03:02–? | 25 mi (40 km) | Unknown | 8 deaths – This tornado formed from the same storm as the Tupelo F5 and may have been an extension of the latter tornado. It destroyed or damaged 30 homes in Red Bay, killing four people. Three additional deaths took place in a filling station and a fourth in another home. 55 injuries occurred and losses totaled $145,000. |
| F3 | E of Rogersville, AL to Shady Grove, TN | Lauderdale (AL), Limestone (AL), Madison (AL), Lincoln (TN) | AL, TN | 04:15–? | 50 mi (80 km) | 200 yd (180 m) | 5 deaths – This intense tornado family formed from the same storm as the Tupelo F5. It produced most of its damage to farms near Elkmont, Alabama, where four people died in a pair of homes that were obliterated. Papers marked from Tupelo, Mississippi, landed in fields near Flintville, Tennessee. 13 people were injured and losses totaled $40,000. |

=== April 6 event ===
Confirmed tornadoes – Monday, April 6, 1936
| F# | Location | County / Parish | State | Time (UTC) | Path length | Max. width | Summary |
|---|---|---|---|---|---|---|---|
| F3 | NE of Acworth | Cobb, Cherokee | GA | 12:22–? | 8 mi (13 km) | 100 yd (91 m) | An intense tornado destroyed several homes, a store, and a gristmill with damage to other structures also reported. Five people sustained injuries. |
| FU | Northern Gainesville to New Holland | Hall | GA | 13:27–? | Unknown | Unknown | This was the first of three destructive tornadoes to strike Gainesville. It hit Brenau College, which is now a university, and continued eastward into New Holland. Trees and buildings on the campus sustained minor damage. |
| F4 | Downtown Gainesville (Two tornadoes) | Hall | GA | 13:37–? | 7 mi (11 km) | 400 yd (370 m) | 203+ deaths – See section on this tornado – 1,600 people were injured. These were the most destructive tornadoes of the outbreak, with $12.5 million in losses. |
| F2 | Northwestern Anderson | Anderson | SC | 14:55–? | 15 mi (24 km) | 400 yd (370 m) | 1 death – This strong tornado, formed by the same storm as the Gainesville tornado, felled a number of trees and destroyed 50 homes as well as multiple farmhouses and a couple of mills. An elderly farmer was killed by falling bricks, and 30 other people were injured. Letters marked as being from Gainesville were found nearby. Total losses were estimated at $250,000-300,000. |
| F2 | W of Carnesville to Lavonia | Franklin | GA | 15:00–? | 15 mi (24 km) | 200 yd (180 m) | 1 death – This strong tornado destroyed nine homes and damaged 15 others. Six injuries were reported along with $25,000 in losses. |

=== Tupelo, Mississippi ===
Tupelo, Mississippi
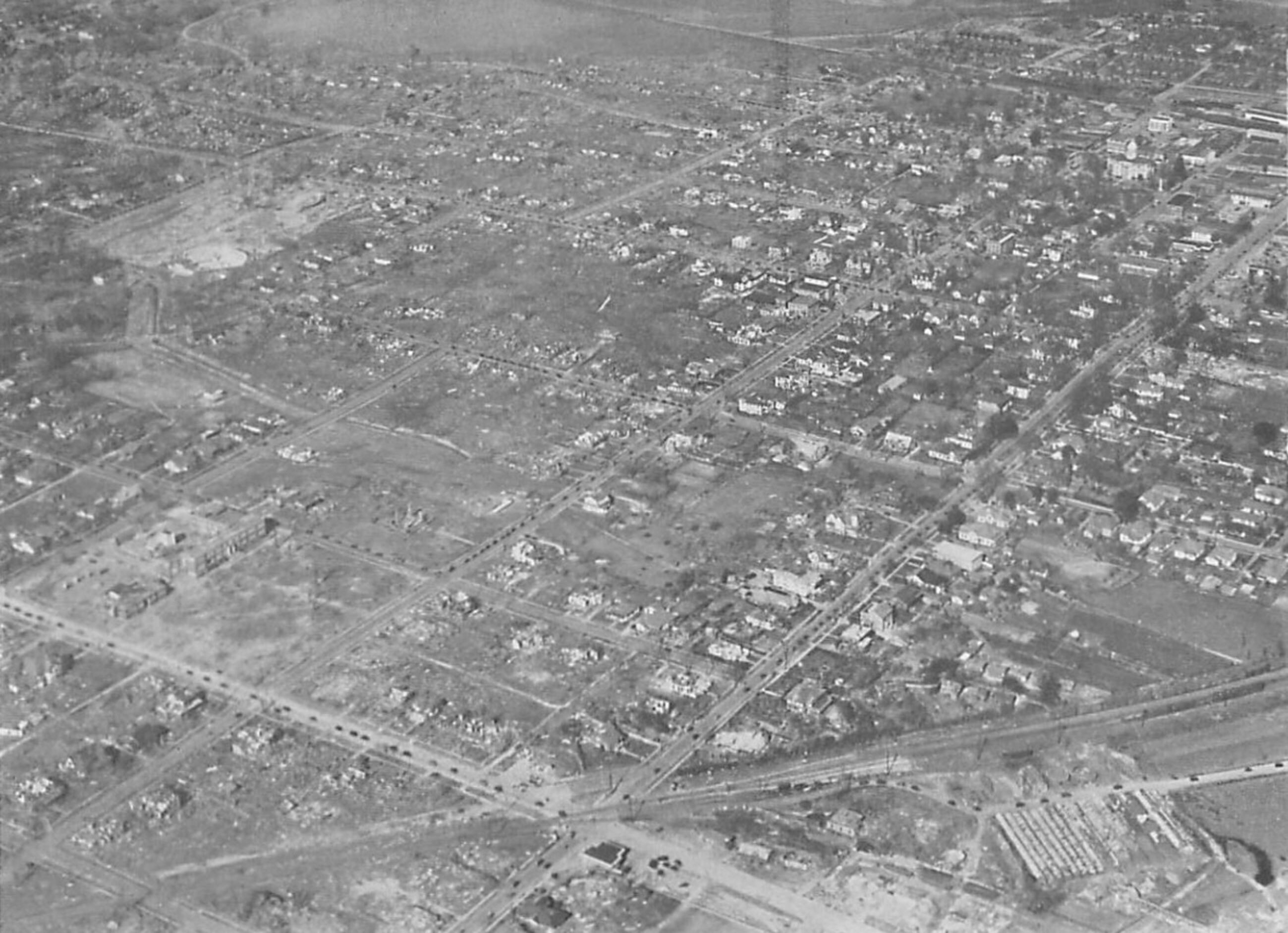
- An aerial view of the city of Tupelo following the tornado.

Meteorological history
- Date: April 5, 1936

F5 tornado
- on the Fujita scale

Overall effects
- Fatalities: 233
- Injuries: ≥700
- Damage: $3 million (1936 USD) $81.2 million (2025 USD)

Making its way toward Tupelo, this massive tornado killed a family of 13 as their house was swept away, and injured many more before reaching Tupelo's west side. Retroactively rated F5 on the modern Fujita scale, it caused total destruction along its path through the Willis Heights neighborhood. Dozens of large and well built mansions were swept completely away in this area. Although missing the business district, the tornado moved through the residential areas of north Tupelo, destroying many homes, and killing whole families. The Gum Pond area of Tupelo was the worst hit. Homes along the pond were swept into the water with their victims. The majority of the bodies were found in Gum Pond, the area which is now Gumtree Park. Reportedly, many bodies were never recovered from the pond. Reports were that the winds were so strong, pine needles were embedded into trunks of trees. As the tornado exited the city's east side, the large concrete Battle of Tupelo monument was toppled to the ground and destroyed. Two nearby brick gate posts were broken off at the base and blown over as well. East of town, granulated structural debris from the city was strewn and wind-rowed for miles through open fields. According to records, the Tupelo tornado leveled 48 city blocks and between 200–900 homes, killing at least 216 people and injuring at least 700 others. The tornado destroyed the water tower and produced numerous fires in its wake, though overnight rains which left knee-deep water in some streets contained the flames. Though 216 remained the final death toll, 100 persons were still hospitalized at the time it was set. Subsequently, the Mississippi State Geologist estimated a final, unofficial death toll of 233. Notably, among the survivors were one-year-old Elvis Presley and his parents.

=== Gainesville, Georgia ===
Gainesville, Georgia
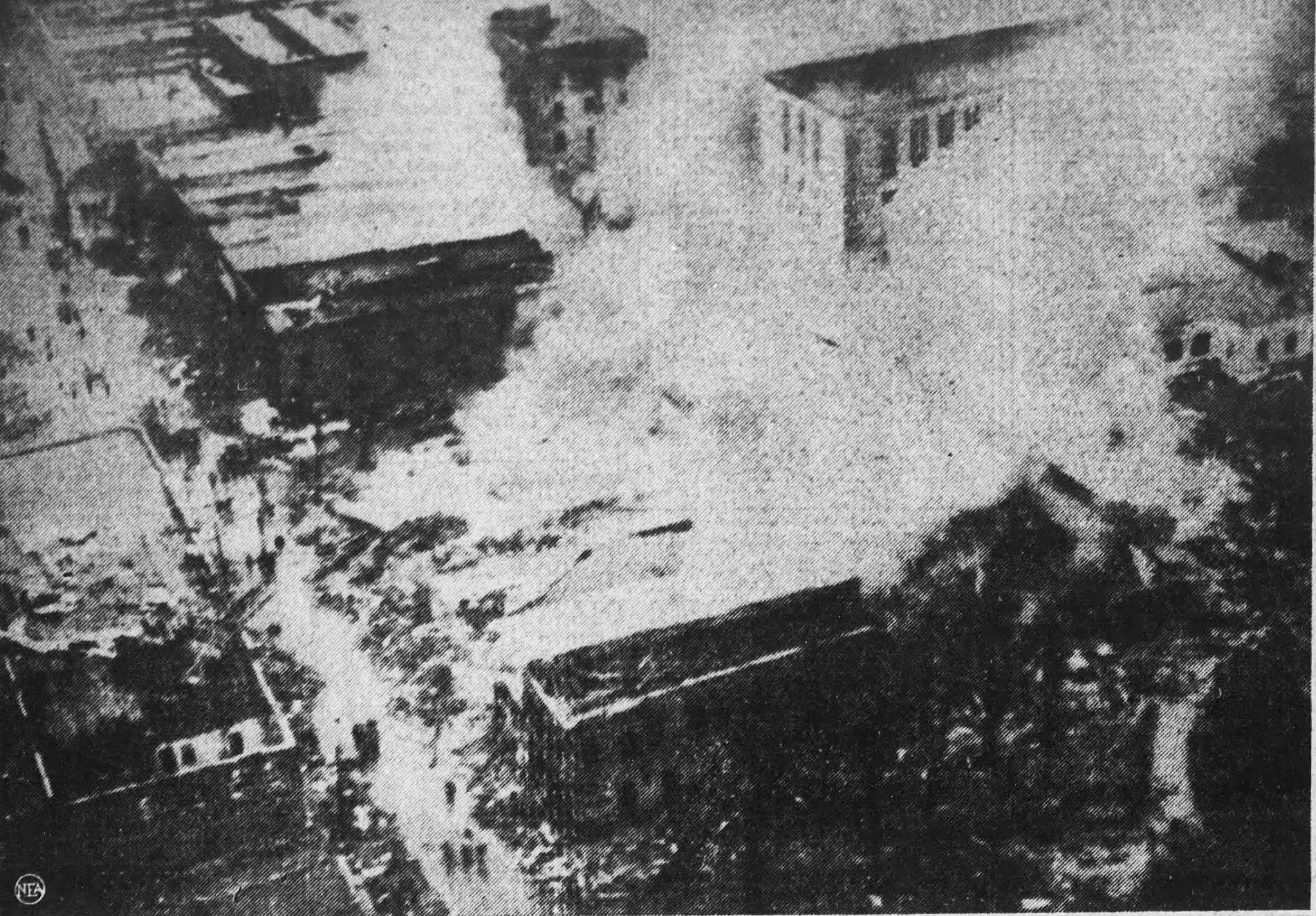
- An aerial photo of several factories ablaze in downtown Gainesville following the tornado.

Tornado family
- Tornadoes: 2
- Max. rating: F4 tornado

Overall effects
- Fatalities: ≥203
- Injuries: ≥1,600
- Damage: $12 1/2 million (1936 USD) $290 million (2025 USD)

After producing the Tupelo tornado, the storm system moved through Alabama overnight and reached Gainesville, Georgia, at around 8:30 a.m local standard time. According to Ted Fujita, this early morning tornado was a double tornado event: one tornado moved in from the Atlanta highway, while the other moved in from the Dawsonville highway. The two merged on Grove Street and destroyed everything throughout the downtown area, causing wreckage to pile 10 feet (3.0 m) high in some places. The worst tornado-caused death toll in a single building in U.S. history was at the Cooper Pants Factory.

President Franklin D. Roosevelt spoke from a train platform in Gainesville on April 9, after the devastating tornado struck the town a few days earlier.

== See also ==
- 1903 Gainesville tornado — Also devastated part of the same city as in 1936

== Sources ==
- Blade, Robert (2012). Tupelo Man: The Life and Times of George McLean, a Most Peculiar Newspaper Publisher. University Press of Mississippi. ISBN 978-1617036286.
- Brooks, Harold E. (April 2004). "On the Relationship of Tornado Path Length and Width to Intensity". Weather and Forecasting. 19 (2): 310–19. Bibcode:2004WtFor..19..310B. doi:10.1175/1520-0434(2004)019<0310:OTROTP>2.0.CO;2.
- Cook, A. R.; Schaefer, J. T. (August 2008). "The Relation of El Niño–Southern Oscillation (ENSO) to Winter Tornado Outbreaks". Monthly Weather Review. 136 (8): 3135. Bibcode:2008MWRv..136.3121C. doi:10.1175/2007MWR2171.1.
- Dundy, Elaine (2004). Elvis and Gladys. University Press of Mississippi. ISBN 978-1578066346.
- Grazulis, Thomas P. (May 1984). Violent Tornado Climatography, 1880–1982. OSTI (Technical report). NUREG. Washington, D.C.: Nuclear Regulatory Commission. OSTI 7099491. CR-3670.
  - — (November 1990). Significant Tornadoes 1880–1989. Vol. 2. St. Johnsbury, Vermont: The Tornado Project of Environmental Films. ISBN 1-879362-02-3.
  - — (July 1993). Significant Tornadoes 1680–1991: A Chronology and Analysis of Events. St. Johnsbury, Vermont: The Tornado Project of Environmental Films. ISBN 1-879362-03-1.
  - — (2001a). The Tornado: Nature's Ultimate Windstorm. Norman: University of Oklahoma Press. ISBN 978-0-8061-3538-0.
  - — (2001b). F5-F6 Tornadoes. St. Johnsbury, Vermont: The Tornado Project of Environmental Films.
- Kincer, J. B. (May 1936). "Tornado disasters in the Southeastern states, April 1936". Monthly Weather Review. 65 (5). Washington, D.C.: United States Weather Bureau: 168–171. Bibcode:1936MWRv...64..168K. doi:10.1175/1520-0493(1936)64<168:TDITSS>2.0.CO;2.
- Lindley, R. T., ed. (April 1936). "General Summary". Mississippi section. Climatological Data. 41 (4). Washington, D.C.: United States Weather Bureau.
- Mason, Bobbie Ann (2007). Elvis Presley. Penguin. ISBN 978-0-14-303889-4 – via Google Books.
- Morse, William Clifford (April 11, 1936). The Tupelo Tornado (PDF) (Technical report). Mississippi State Geological Survey. University, Mississippi: University of Mississippi. 31, The Tupelo Tornado. Archived from the original (PDF) on December 13, 2013 – via Mississippi Department of Environmental Quality.
- Ramage, Jr., Martis (1997). Tupelo, Mississippi, Tornado of 1936. Northeast Mississippi Historical and Genealogical Society.
- Sandlin, Lee (2013). Storm Kings: The Untold Story of America's First Storm Chasers. Pantheon Books. ISBN 978-0307378521.
- "Severe local storms". Monthly Weather Review. 64 (4). Washington, D.C.: United States Weather Bureau: 156–8. April 1936. Bibcode:1936MWRv...64..156K. doi:10.1175/1520-0493(1936)64<156:SLSA>2.0.CO;2.
- Steed, Bud (2012). The Haunted Natchez Trace. The History Press. ISBN 978-1609495312.
- Tracy, Kathleen (2007). Elvis Presley: A Biography. Greenwood Publishing Group. ISBN 978-0-313-33827-4 – via Google Books.
