= Stoneville, North Carolina =

- Town
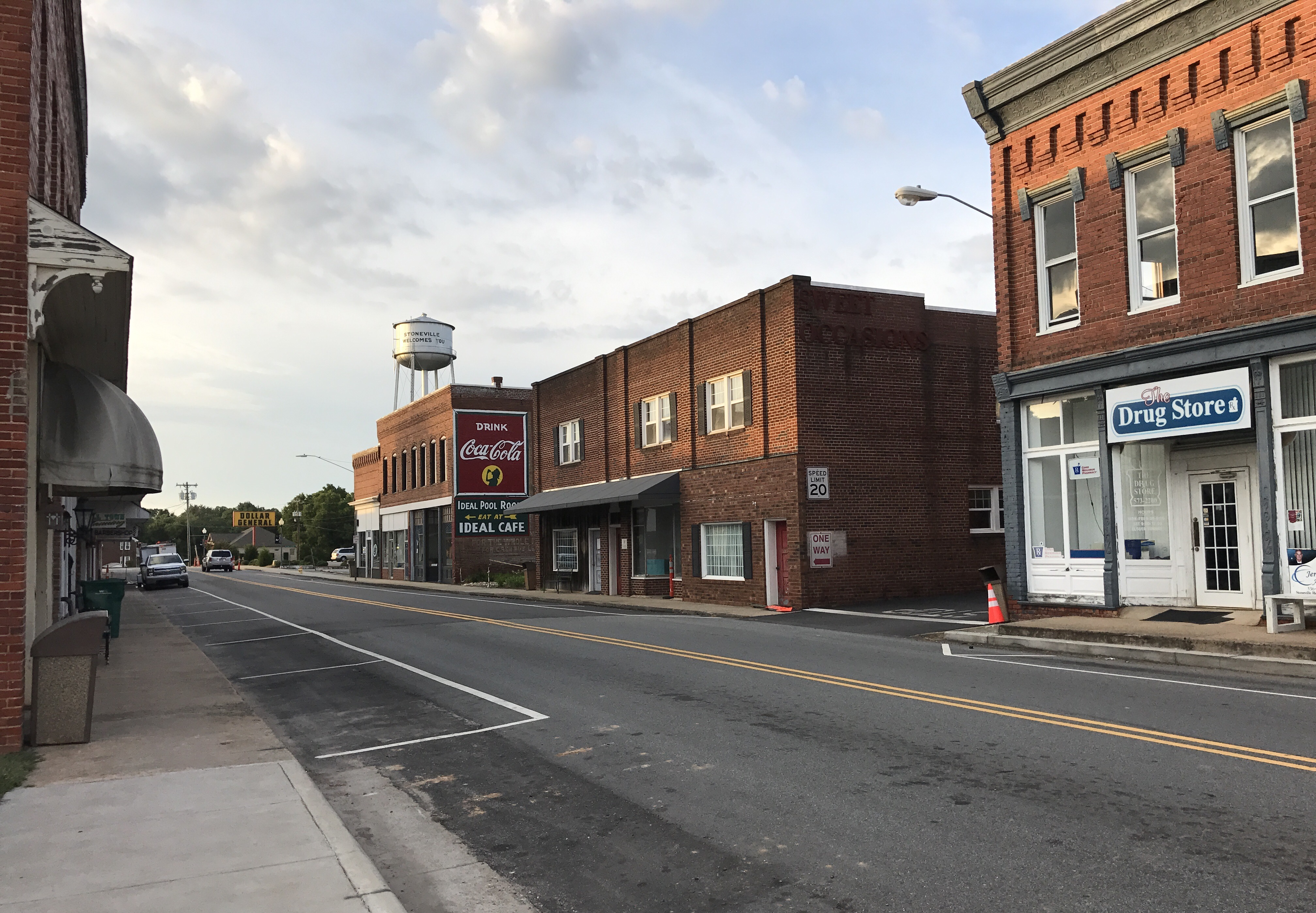

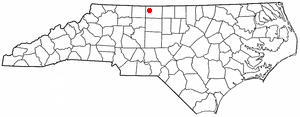
- Location of Stoneville, North Carolina
- Coordinates: 36°27′55″N 79°54′23″W
- Country: United States
- State: North Carolina
- County: Rockingham
- Established: 1877
- Named for: Stone family

Area
  - Total: 1.43 sq mi (3.70 km^{2})
  - Land: 1.43 sq mi (3.70 km^{2})
  - Water: 0 sq mi (0.00 km^{2})
- Elevation: 814 ft (248 m)

Population (2020)
  - Total: 1,308
  - Density: 914.7/sq mi (353.15/km^{2})
- Time zone: UTC-5 (Eastern (EST))
  - Summer (DST): UTC-4 (EDT)
- ZIP code: 27048
- Area code: 336
- FIPS code: 37-65100
- GNIS feature ID: 2406669
- Website: Town Of Stoneville, NC

Stoneville is a town in Rockingham County, North Carolina, United States. Stoneville is part of the Greensboro–High Point metropolitan area of the Piedmont Triad. At the 2020 United States census, the town had a population of 1,308.

== History ==
Settlers came to the ridge between the Mayo and Dan rivers in the northwest Piedmont region in the early 1800s. In 1827, the Deep Springs Plantation was built for James Madison Scales and his wife Elizabeth Lesuer in what is now Stoneville. In 1843, the R. H. Lewis Tobacco company was established in the south side of the land that became Stoneville. In the late 1850s, brothers Thomas and Pinkney Stone bought land in the area. On March 5, 1877, the town was officially incorporated. A natural stop on the Norfolk-Western rail line, Stoneville became the trade hub for the surrounding localities and profited off of tobacco, cotton and grist-milling industries.

On March 20, 1998, Stoneville was struck by an F3 tornado. It caused severe damage to commercial structures in the town's main business district along Henry Street, destroyed the railway depot, and killed one person in town, an elementary school teacher and dancer named Beth Mitchell, and one person southwest of the town, Powell Hickman. Several buildings downtown were completely removed, and most cleanup and repair work was done within a year. The town later built Friendship Park and painted a mural at the site of a destroyed store to commemorate Mitchell and Hickman.

== Geography ==
According to the United States Census Bureau, the town has an area of 1.2 square miles (3.1 km^{2}), all of it land.

== Demographics ==
Historical population
Census	Pop.	Note	%±
1880	100		—
1890	115		15.0%
1910	404		—
1920	472		16.8%
1930	564		19.5%
1940	615		9.0%
1950	786		27.8%
1960	951		21.0%
1970	1,030		8.3%
1980	1,054		2.3%
1990	1,109		5.2%
2000	1,002		−9.6%
2010	1,056		5.4%
2020	1,308		23.9%
2021 (est.)	1,312	▲	0.3%
U.S. Decennial Census

=== 2020 census ===
Stoneville racial composition
Race	Number	Percentage
White (non-Hispanic)	905	69.19%
Black or African American (non-Hispanic)	172	13.15%
Asian	5	0.38%
Other/Mixed	44	3.36%
Hispanic or Latino	182	13.91%

As of the 2020 United States census, there were 1,308 people, 474 households, and 374 families residing in the town.

=== 2010 census ===
As of the census of 2010, there were 1,056 people, 469 households, and 292 families residing in the town. The population density was 820.4 people per square mile (316.8 people/km^{2}). There were 518 housing units at an average density of 424.1 per square mile (163.7/km^{2}). The racial makeup of the town was 77.64% White, 19.26% African American, 0.10% Pacific Islander, 2.10% from other races, and 0.90% from two or more races. Hispanic or Latino of any race were 3.59% of the population.

There were 469 households, out of which 20.7% had children under the age of 18 living with them, 47.3% were married couples living together, 11.9% had a female householder with no husband present, and 37.7% were non-families. 35.2% of all households were made up of individuals, and 20.0% had someone living alone who was 65 years of age or older. The average household size was 2.13 and the average family size was 2.73.

In the town, the population was spread out, with 20.0% under the age of 18, 5.8% from 18 to 24, 24.8% from 25 to 44, 25.9% from 45 to 64, and 23.6% who were 65 years of age or older. The median age was 45 years. For every 100 females, there were 83.5 males. For every 100 females age 18 and over, there were 79.0 males.

The median income for a household in the town was $28,313, and the median income for a family was $39,375. Males had a median income of $26,167 versus $21,354 for females. The per capita income for the town was $17,255. About 8.2% of families and 12.7% of the population were below the poverty line, including 17.0% of those under age 18 and 20.9% of those age 65 or over.

== Arts and culture ==
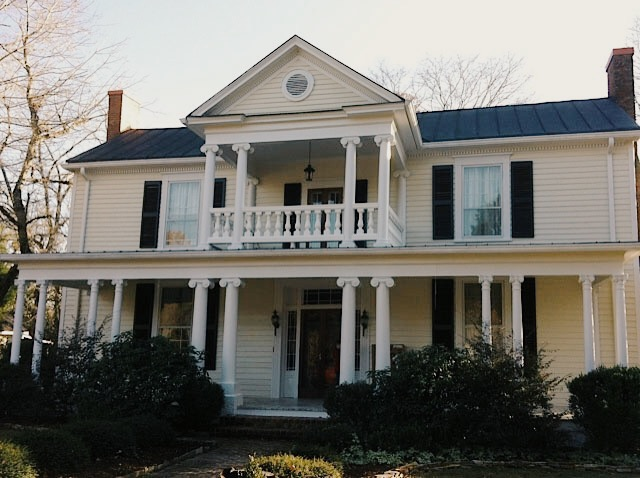
Deep Springs Plantation

Historic sites include Deep Springs Plantation and Mulberry Island Plantation.

== Education ==
Stoneville is served by the following public schools:

- Stoneville Elementary School
- West Rockingham Middle School (located in Madison)
- Dalton L. McMichael High School (located in Mayodan)

The Rockingham Public Library system provides the town with the Stoneville branch library.

== Infrastructure ==
=== Transportation ===
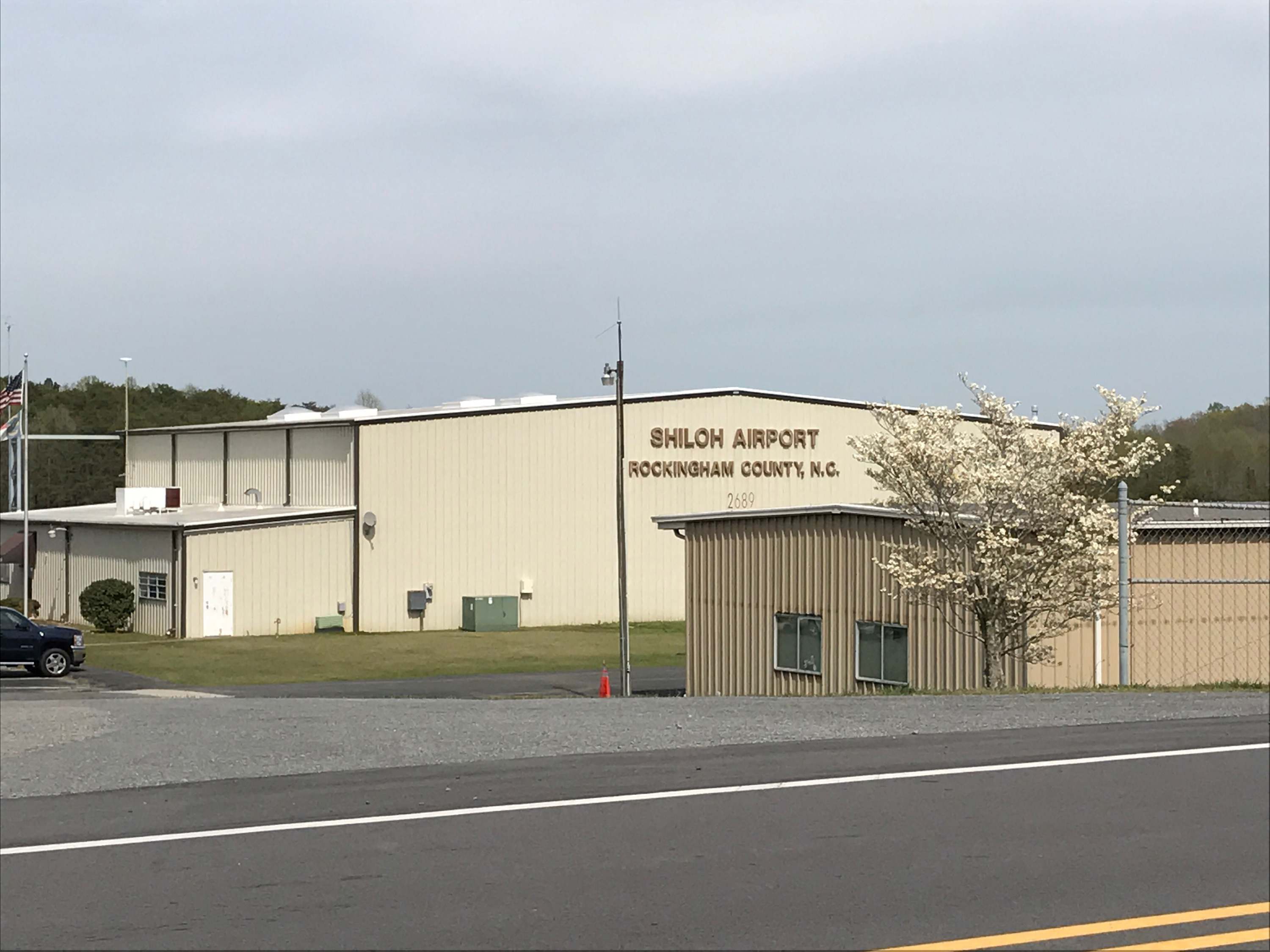
Shiloh Airport

==== Airports ====
Rockingham County NC Shiloh Airport is a county-owned public-use airport that serves Stoneville, Madison, Eden, and Reidsville.

==== Highways ====
Stoneville is centered around the crossroads of Main Street (North Carolina Highway 770) and Henry Street. U.S. Route 220 bypasses the town to the west, connecting Stoneville to Martinsville, Virginia, in the north and Greensboro in the south, and U.S. Route 311/North Carolina Highway 135 passes south of the town between the central business district and the airport.

==== Rail ====
The Winston-Salem District of the Norfolk Southern Railroad passes north–south through Stoneville, bisecting the town.

== Notable people ==
- Tabitha Brown (born 1979) - actress and social media personality
- William Edward Crews (1932–2024) - mayor of Stoneville
- Beth Mitchell (1972–1998) - competitive shag dancer
- T. Clarence Stone (1899–1969) - politician and businessman
- William F. Stone (1909–1973) - lawyer and politician
- J. J. Webster (1898–1965) - farmer, businessman, politician
- Jeff Webster (born 1966) - checkers champion
- John Ray Webster (born 1942) - checkers champion
- Mary Comer Webster (1928–2008) - political strategist
