= J. J. Webster =

American politician, farmer, and businessman

James Jefferson Webster
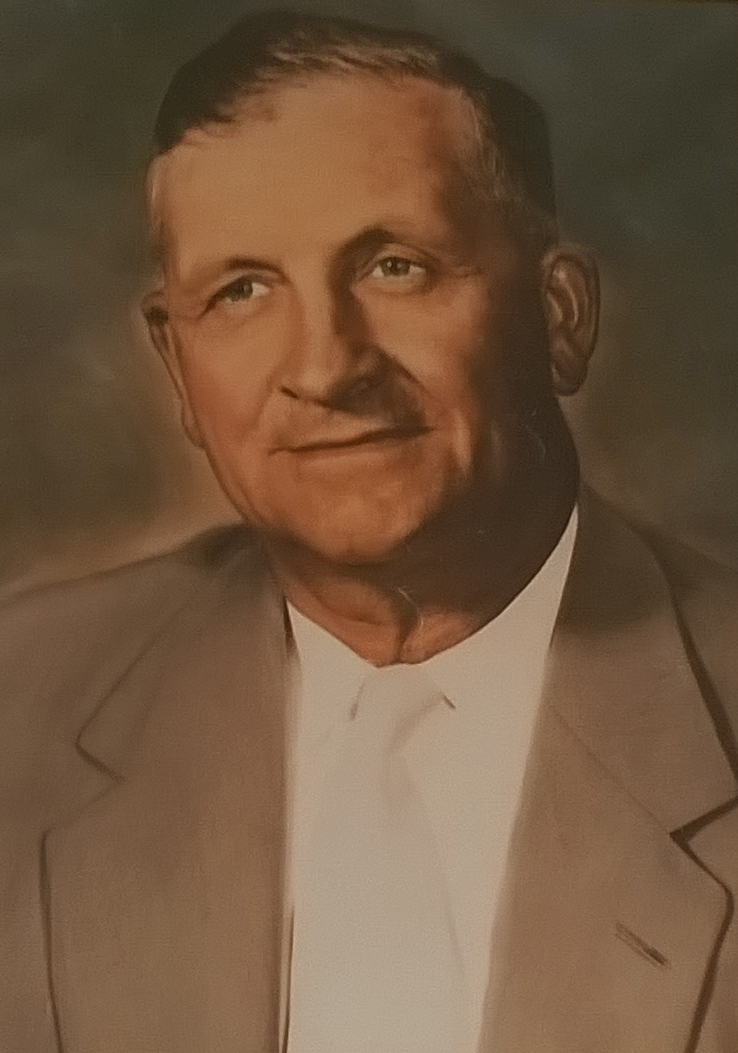

Rockingham County Commissioner
- In office November 3, 1942 – 1952
- Preceded by: Harvey Glenn

Personal details
- Born: September 27, 1898 Patrick County, Virginia
- Died: May 24, 1965 (aged 66)
- Resting place: Centenary United Methodist Church, Stoneville, North Carolina
- Party: Democratic Party
- Spouse: Nannie Hurt Strong
- Children: 5 (including John Ray Webster)
- Parent(s): James William Webster; Lillie Holt Davis
- Relatives: Mary Comer Webster (daughter-in-law); James Jefferson Webster III (grandson); Elizabeth Webster Mitchell (great-granddaughter)
- Occupation: businessman, politician, farmer

James Jefferson Webster Sr. (September 27, 1898 – May 24, 1965) was an American businessman, farmer and politician who served as Rockingham County commissioner in North Carolina from 1942 to 1952. As a county commissioner, he played a role in the development of North Carolina Highway 135, which was posthumously named after him, and worked on the gubernatorial campaign of W. Kerr Scott. He owned a dairy and tobacco farm, tobacco warehouses, a general store, and co-ran a car dealership in Rockingham County.

== Biography ==
Webster was born on September 27, 1898, in Patrick County, Virginia, to James Thomas Webster and Lillie Holt Davis. He was one of six children. The family relocated to Rockingham County, North Carolina, where his father was possibly employed in the construction of the Avalon Mill. By the time he was six, Webster was orphaned, and he spent the next few years living with his brothers and other families. On December 24, 1923, he married Nannie Hurt Strong in Martinsville, Virginia, and had five children with her: James Jefferson II, Nancy Lucille, Margaret Ann, Robert Penn, and John Ray.

In 1927 Webster purchased a wood-built store at the intersection of North Carolina Highway 135 and Settle Bridge Road in Rockingham County and opened J.J. Webster's Store. As the local general store, it served as a gathering point for the Shiloh community. Webster used his position as the store's owner to assist struggling families in the area; he allowed farmers to purchase goods on credit and would wait to call their tab after their tobacco had been sold. Webster was also a tobacco and dairy farmer and operated tobacco warehouses in Stoneville and Clarkton. On May 1, 1937, Webster, together with George Amos Dillon, Robert Smith, and Clyde Smith, opened an Oldsmobile car dealership in a sheet-metal garage building in Madison under the name of W.D.S. Motors, Incorporated. A new W.D.S. Motors building opened on October 5, 1940. In 1955 the wooden J.J. Webster Store building was moved and a brick structure was erected in its place.

On March 19, 1936, Webster served as a witness in Raleigh, alongside J.S. Carter and J.S. Doyle, at the execution of Jake Johnston, a black man who was charged with attacking an elderly white schoolteacher in Rockingham County in 1935.

=== Political career ===
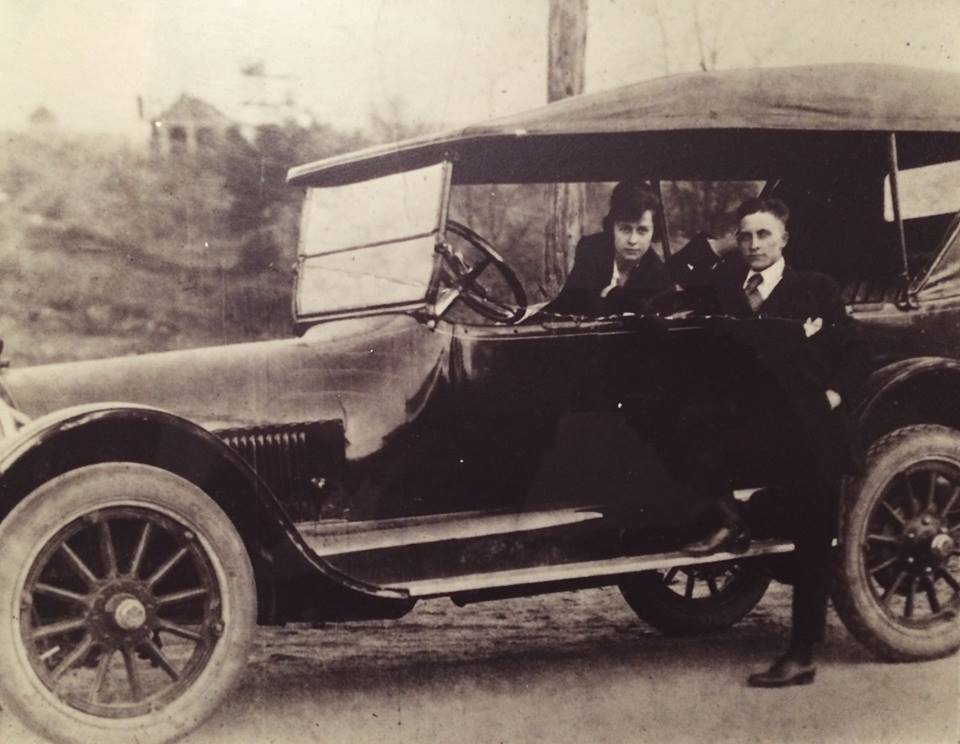
James Jefferson Webster and his wife, Nannie Hurt Strong, with their car

On November 3, 1942, Webster—receiving 241 votes from Madison—was elected as a member of the Democratic Party to the Rockingham County Board of Commissioners. In the late 1940s he worked on W. Kerr Scott's successful gubernatorial campaign. When Scott passed a large road construction project through the state legislature, Webster used his position as county commissioner to ensure that N.C. Highway 135 and Settle Bridge Road were paved. He remained on the Board of Commissioners until 1952.

=== Death ===
Webster suffered a heart attack and died on May 24, 1965. He was buried at Centenary United Methodist Church in Stoneville, where he was a parishioner.

== Legacy ==
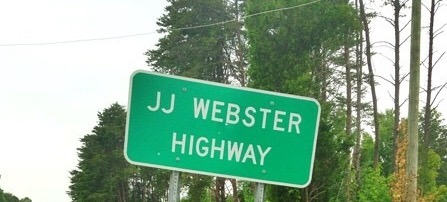
J.J. Webster Highway sign

J.J. Webster's Store was run by Webster's family after his death. After his son, James Jefferson Webster II, died, his wife Mary Comer Webster ran the business until the stock of the business was sold to a family friend in 1978. The brick store was closed on December 31, 1994, and soon thereafter demolished to make room for an expansion of N.C. Highway 135.

Bill Crews, the mayor of Stoneville, proposed naming N.C. Highway 135 in honor of Webster, who had advised him on his mayoral campaign. In May 1995 following the concurrence of Rockingham County's municipalities, the board of commissioners approved a resolution to dedicate N.C. Highway 135 in Webster's name. On July 7, 1995, at the recommendation of Douglas Galyon, the North Carolina Board of Transportation passed a resolution renaming the highway. A formal dedication ceremony took place at 11:00 a.m. on October 28, 1998, at Dalton L. McMichael High School.
