= Ione Grogan =

American academic and educator

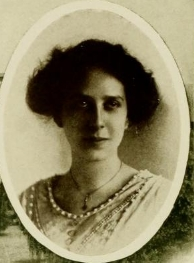
- Grogan in 1913
- Born: March 4, 1891; Reidsville, North Carolina, U.S.
- Died: February 5, 1961 (aged 69)
- Resting place: Greenview Cemetery
- Education: Woman's College of the University of North Carolina; Columbia University
- Occupations: schoolteacher, academic, professor
- Parent(s): John Henry Grogan; Mary Alice Robertson

Ione Holt Grogan (March 4, 1891 – February 5, 1961) was an American academic, mathematician, and educator. She worked as a schoolteacher in North Carolina and Georgia for twenty-two years before joining the faculty at the Woman's College of the University of North Carolina, where she was a professor of mathematics from 1935 to 1958. A dormitory, a residence college, and a scholarship at the University of North Carolina at Greensboro (previously the Woman's College), are named after her. Grogan was also the president of the Reviewers Club, the oldest literary club for women in North Carolina.

== Early life, family, and education ==
Grogan was born on March 4, 1891, in Reidsville, North Carolina, to John Henry Grogan and Mary Alice Robertson. Through her mother, she was a descendant of the Robertson family, a Virginian colonial family, and was a relative of Captain John Ray Webster. Her mother was raised by an aunt and uncle, Margaret Hurt Robertson and Walter Scott Irving, Webster's great-grandparents, on their tobacco farm near Stoneville after the death of Grogan's grandmother, Nancy Montgomery. Grogan had one brother, Frank Elmer Grogan.

She received two degrees from the Woman's College of the University of North Carolina, an English degree in 1913 and a mathematics degree in 1926. In 1928 she earned a master's degree in mathematics from Columbia University.

== Career ==
From 1913 through the 1920s, prior to going to graduate school at Columbia, Grogan taught English at elementary, middle, and high schools in North Carolina and Georgia. She worked as a teacher for twenty-two years before joining the faculty at the Woman's College of the University of North Carolina in 1935. She was a mathematics professor at the college and served as residence hall counsel for the Coit and Weil dormitories until 1958. She served as president of the college's Alumnae Association from 1945 to 1947.

While living in Greensboro, Grogan was an active member of the North Carolina Democratic Party and the Greensboro League of Women Voters, and served as president of the Reviewers Club, the oldest literary club for women in North Carolina.

== Death and legacy ==
Grogan died on February 5, 1961. She was buried at Greenview Cemetery in Reidsville.

The Ione Holt Grogan Scholarship, as well as the Grogan Residence Hall and Grogan Residential College at the University of North Carolina at Greensboro, are named after her.
