= Hector (immigration ship) =

Coordinates: 45.67465°N 62.71022°W

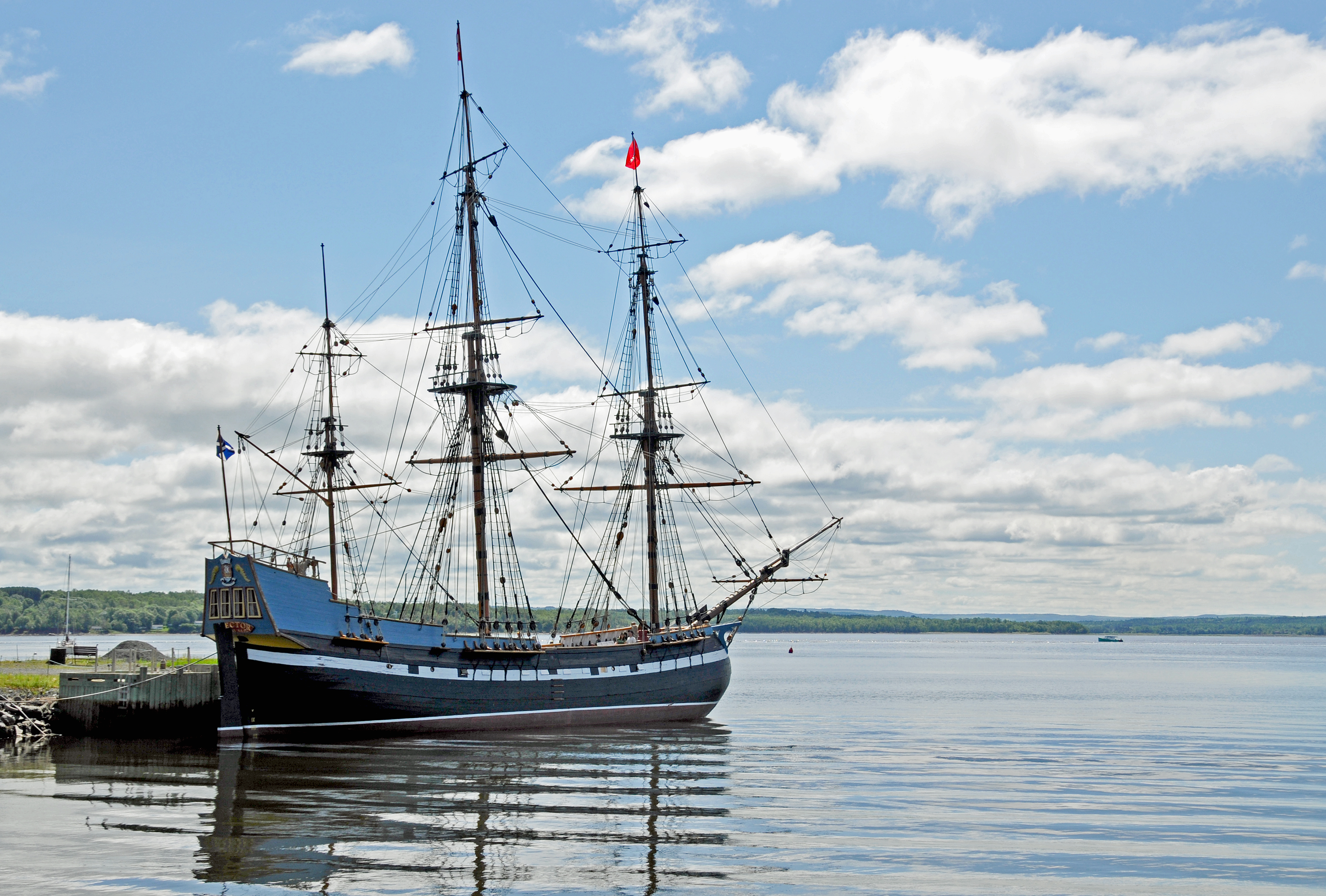
- Location: Pictou, Nova Scotia, Canada
- Type: Museum ship
- Website: shiphector.ca

Hector was a ship that was part of the first significant migration of Scottish settlers to Nova Scotia in 1773. A replica of the original ship is located at the Hector Heritage Quay, a heritage centre run by local volunteers, in Pictou, Nova Scotia. (Note: Historian Ian McKay and Robin Bates note that there were many Scots already in Nova Scotia prior to the arrival of the Hector.)

== History ==
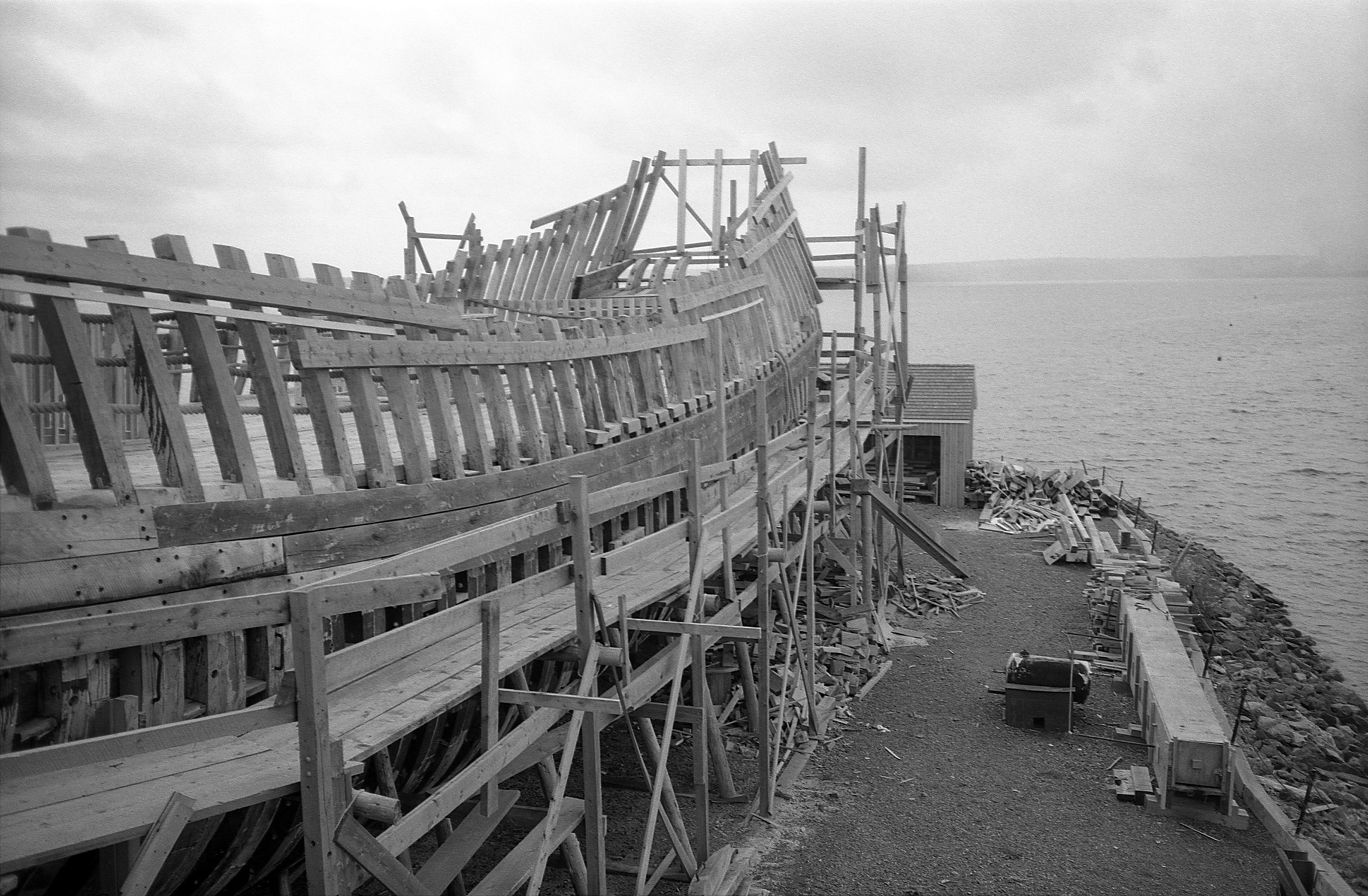
Replica ship Hector under construction at Heritage Quay, Pictou, NS on July 5, 1996

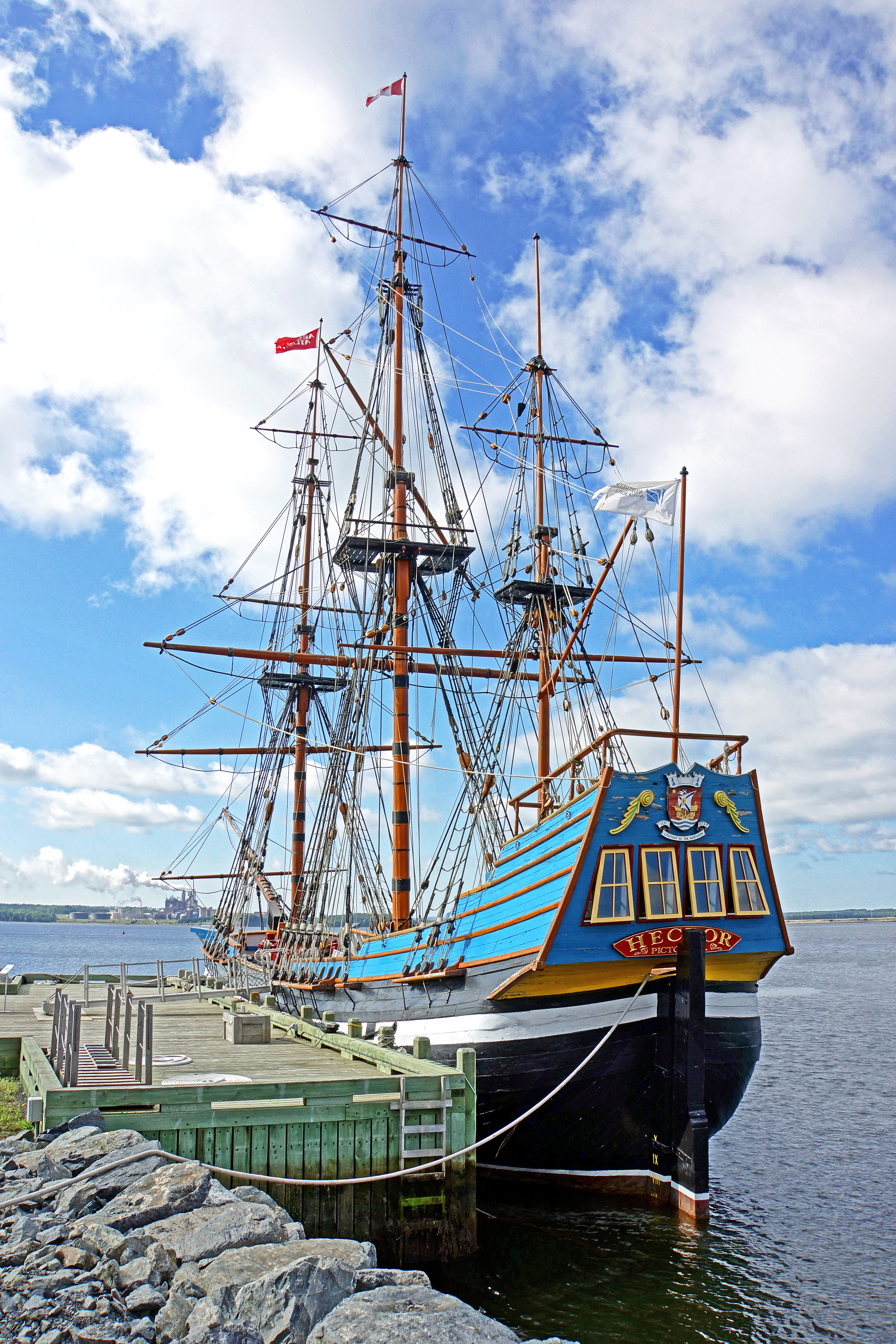
Hector at Heritage Quay, 2012

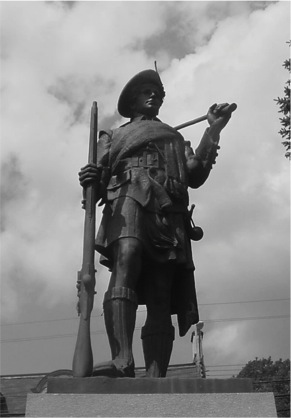
Hector Pioneer Monument, Pictou, Nova Scotia, by Nova Scotian sculptor John Wilson

A full-rigged Fluyt, Hector (built in the Netherlands before 1750) was employed in local trade in waters off the British Isles as well as the immigrant trade to North America, having made at least one trip c. 1770 carrying Scottish emigrants to Boston, Massachusetts.

In 1762 the earliest of the Scottish Highland Clearances forced many Gaelic families off their ancestral lands. The first ship loaded with Hebridean colonists arrived on "St.-John's Island" (Prince Edward Island) in 1770, with later ships following in 1772, and 1774. In 1773 a ship named Hector landed in Pictou, Nova Scotia with 189 settlers, mostly originating from Loch Broom. In 1784 the last barrier to Scottish settlement – a law restricting land-ownership on Cape Breton Island – was repealed, and soon parts of both Prince Edward Island and Eastern Nova Scotia were predominantly Gaelic-speaking. It is estimated more than 50,000 Gaelic settlers emigrated to Nova Scotia and Cape Breton Island between 1815 and 1870.

Her famous voyage took place in 1773 with a departure date around the second week of July, carrying 189 Highlanders who were immigrating to Nova Scotia. The vessel's owner, Mr. John Pagan, along with Dr. John Witherspoon, purchased three shares of land near Pictou, Nova Scotia. Pagan and Witherspoon hired John Ross as a recruiting agent for settlers willing to emigrate to Pictou with an offer of free passage, 1 year of free provisions, and a farm. The settlers (23 families, 25 single men) were recruited at Greenock Renfrewshire and at Loch Broom (Ross-shire) with the majority being from Loch Broom. The settlers that boarded Hector were poor, "obscure, illiterate crofters and artisans from Northern [Scotland], who spoke Gaelic." The school teacher, William McKenzie was one of the few passengers on the Hector to speak both Gaelic and English.

Hector was an old ship and in poor condition when she left Europe. The arduous voyage to Pictou took 11 weeks, with a gale off Newfoundland causing a 14-day delay. Dysentery and smallpox claimed 18 lives amongst the passengers. The vessel arrived in Pictou Harbour on September 15, landing at Brown's Point, immediately west of the present-day town of Pictou.

The year's free provisions never materialized for the passengers of Hector. They had to hurry to build shelter without those provisions before winter set in and starved them.

== Second ship ==
Another ship, also named Hector was built in 1789. This ship brought over Scottish immigrants to the United States, making departures from Liverpool to New York City in the 1820s and 1830s.

== Replica ==
During the late 1980s and early 1990s, heritage officials in Nova Scotia sought to commemorate the Hector's contribution to Nova Scotia's Scottish history. In 1992, the Ship Hector Foundation was formed from a group of volunteers in Pictou County and elsewhere who began to raise funds for the construction, maintenance and operation of a replica of Hector.

The Hector Heritage Quay, along with the Ship Hector Company Store were opened on the Pictou waterfront in the ensuing years. The marine architect firm J.B. McGuire Marine Associates Ltd. was commissioned to research the particulars of the original Hector and to develop blueprints for an accurate replica. Scotia Trawlers of Lunenburg, Nova Scotia were commissioned to complete phase one and two of the construction at the Hector Heritage Quay, which allowed visitors to the Pictou waterfront to observe the ship's progress, making it an important local attraction. After several years of construction, the replica Hector was launched with great fanfare and media coverage on September 17, 2000. The date had been delayed due to poor weather on the 16th.

== Specifications ==
Year built: before 1750
Location: Pictou, NS
Deck length overall: 25.9 m (85 ft)
Beam: 6.7 m (22 ft)
Gross tonnage: 200
Number of masts: 3
Owner: Mr. John Pagan, a merchant in Greenock, Renfrewshire, Scotland

== Bibliography ==
- Boudreau, Michael. "A 'Rare and Unusual Treat of Historical Significance': The 1923 Hector Celebration and the Political Economy of the Past." Journal of Canadian Studies 28 (4) (1993): 28–48.
- Bumsted, J.M. (1981). "Scottish Emigration to the Maritimes, 1770–1815: A New Look at an Old Theme". Acadiensis. 10: 65–85.
- Campey, Lucille H. "After the Hector" Toronto: Natural Heritage/Natural History Inc., 2004
- MacKay, Donald. Scotland Farewell: The People of the Hector. Toronto: Natural Heritage/Natural History Inc., 2001.
- Reid, Leonard M. Sons of the Hector. New Glasgow, Nova Scotia: Hector Publishing Co., 1973.
