= Dalton L. McMichael High School =

American public school in North Carolina

Location
- 6845 NC Highway 135; Mayodan, North Carolina 27027; United States; 36°25′4″N 79°56′29″W

Information
- Other name: DMHS or McM
- Type: Public
- Established: 1991 (35 years ago)
- School district: Rockingham County Schools
- CEEB code: 342450
- Principal: Cecil Kemp
- Teaching staff: 32.70 (FTE)
- Grades: 9–12
- Gender: Co-educational
- Enrollment: 681 (2024–2025)
- Student to teacher ratio: 20.83
- Campus type: Rural
- Colors: Royal blue and gold
- Athletics conference: North Carolina High School Athletic Association (NHSAA)
- Nickname: Fighting Phoenix
- Website: www.rock.k12.nc.us/o/dmhs/

Dalton L. McMichael High School is a four-year public high school located in Mayodan, North Carolina, United States.

== History ==
The school was named after Dalton L. McMichael (1914–2001), a textile executive and former chairman of the Madison-Mayodan School Board.

The school was established from the merger of Madison-Mayodan and Stoneville high schools. The athletic programs of the two former schools (formerly the Falcons and Eagles, respectively) were merged in 1989, and new facilities were opened in 1991, with the opening McMichael High School.

== Athletics ==
McMichael High School is a member of the North Carolina High School Athletic Association (NCHSAA).

The wrestling team won the 2004 and 2007 NCHSAA 2A dual team state championship, led by Coach Jon Bullins; the boys tennis team were 1995 NCHSAA 3A state champions, led by Coach Steve Spencer; and the baseball team were 2009 NCHSAA 2A state champions, led by Coach Mike Dalton.

== Notable alumni ==
- Beth Mitchell, educator and competitive shag dancer
- Allen Webster, Major League Baseball pitcher
