= North Carolina Highway 135 =

State highway in Rockingham County, North Carolina, US

North Carolina Highway 135
- J.J. Webster Highway

Route information
- Maintained by NCDOT
- Length: 11.2 mi (18.0 km)
- Existed: 1967–present

Major junctions
- West end: US 220 Bus. in Mayodan
- US 220 / US 311 near Mayodan
- East end: US 311 / NC 770 near Eden

Location
- Country: United States
- State: North Carolina
- Counties: Rockingham

Highway system
- North Carolina Highway System; Interstate; US; State; Scenic
| ← NC 134 | → NC 136 |

North Carolina Highway 135 (NC 135), designated the J.J. Webster Highway, is a 11.2-mile-long (18.0 km) road running from Mayodan to Eden in the US state of North Carolina. It runs concurrently with U.S. Route 311 (US 311) for most of its route.

== History ==
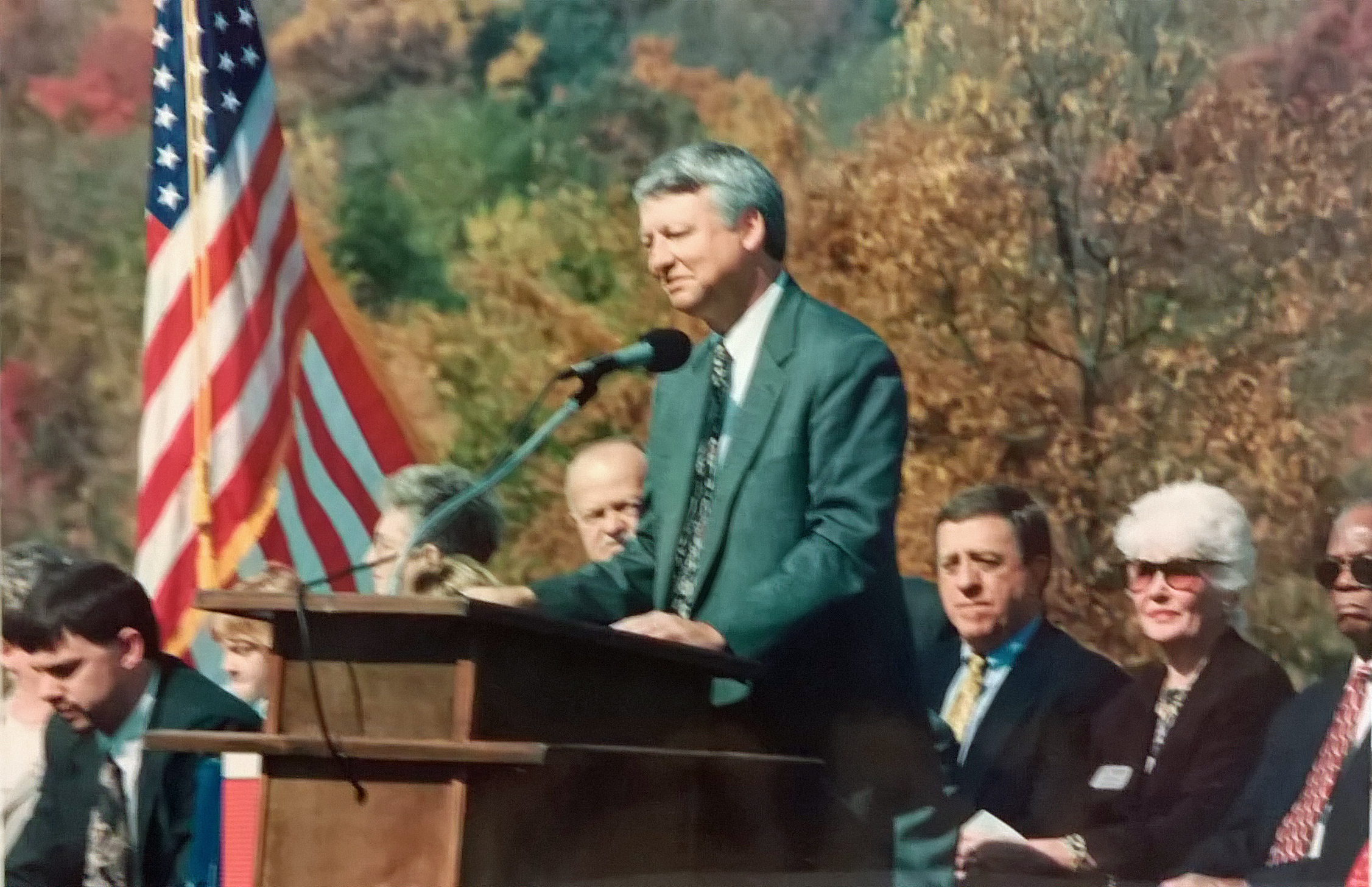
The North Carolina Secretary of Transportation speaking at the J.J. Webster Highway dedication ceremony

NC 135 was designated in 1967 as an upgrade of SR 2138; the highway roughly followed its current routing. In 2000, the designation shortened to end at a rerouted NC 770. The US 311 designation was added to NC 135 in 2004.

The highway was named after James Jefferson Webster Sr., a local store owner, dairy farmer, and politician who served as a Rockingham County commissioner from 1944 until 1952. His store was destroyed to make room for the highway's expansion. On July 7, 1995 at the recommendation of Douglas Gaylon, the North Carolina Board of Transportation passed a resolution officially dedicating North Carolina Highway 135 in Rockingham County in his name. A formal dedication ceremony took place at 11:00 A.M. on October 28, 1998 at Dalton L. McMichael High School, attended by Rep. Virginia Foxx and Commissioner Patricia Wright Gwyn.

== Junction list ==
The entire route is in Rockingham County.

| Location | mi | km | Destinations | Notes |
|---|---|---|---|---|
| Mayodan | 0.0 | 0.0 | US 220 Bus. (South 2nd Avenue) – Mayodan, Madison | |
| | 1.8– 2.0 | 2.9– 3.2 | US 220 / US 311 south – Greenville, Stoneville | Interchange; western end of US 311 concurrency |
| Eden | 11.2 | 18.0 | US 311 north / NC 770 (Harrington Highway) / Old NC 135 | Eastern end of US 311 concurrency |
1.000 mi = 1.609 km; 1.000 km = 0.621 mi: Concurrency terminus
