= Webster (surname) =

Webster is an occupational surname of English origin meaning weaver. The name Webster may refer to:

== People ==
- Aaron Webster (1959–2001), Canadian murder victim
- Aaron Webster (footballer) (born 1980), English footballer
- Andrew Webster, several people
- Adam Webster (footballer, born 1995) (born 1995), English footballer
- Alasdair Webster (born 1934), Australian politician
- Alex Webster, bass player in the band Cannibal Corpse
- Alexander Webster (1708–1784), Scottish writer and clergyman
- Alexander Webster (New York politician) (1734–1810), New York politician
- Andy Webster (footballer, born 1982), Scottish football player
- Arthur Gordon Webster, American physicist, founder of the American Physical Society
- Augusta Webster (1837–1894), English poet, dramatist, essayist, and translator
- Barbara D. Webster, American botanist
- Barry Webster (1935–2023), English footballer
- Barry Webster (writer) (born 1961), Canadian writer
- Ben Webster, American jazz musician
- Ben Webster (actor) (1864–1947), English actor
- Benjamin Nottingham Webster (1797–1882), English actor
- Bethuel M. Webster (1900–1989), American lawyer, founder of Webster & Sheffield
- Beveridge Webster (1908–1999), American pianist
- Brent Webster, American lawyer
- Bruce Webster, American IT expert and software engineer
- Bruce Webster (politician) (1927–2019)
- Byron Webster, English footballer
- Charles Webster, several people
- Cheyenne Webster (born 1998), American gymnast
- Chloé Webster (born 1989), Scottish actress
- Cooper Webster, Australian racing driver
- Corey Webster, American football player
- Dale Webster (1948–2025), American surfer
- Daniel Webster, several people
- David Webster, several people
- Dick Webster (1914–2009), British Army officer and pole vaulter
- Donovan Webster, American journalist
- Edwin Hanson Webster (1829–1893), American politician
- Elnardo Webster (born 1969), American football player
- Faye Webster (born 1997), American singer
- Frances Webster (netball), New Zealand netball player
- Francis Webster (1767–1827), English architect
- Francis Marion Webster (1849–1916), American entomologist
- Frank Webster, several people
- Gary Webster, several people
- Geoff Webster (born 1959), British journalist, deputy editor of The Sun
- George Webster, several people
- Gloria Cranmer Webster (1931–2023), Canadian activist and writer
- Graham Webster (archaeologist), British archaeologist
- Graham Webster (footballer), Scottish football player
- Guy Webster (musician), an Australian singer-songwriter
- Guy Webster (photographer) (1939–2019), American photographer
- H. T. Webster (1885–1952), American cartoonist
- Harry Webster, British automotive engineer
- Henry Webster, several people
- Hutton Webster (1875–1955), American anthropologist, economist and sociologist
- J. Webster (Yorkshire cricketer), English cricketer
- Jack Webster, several people
- Jacques Bermon Webster II (born 1992), better known as Travis Scott, American recording artist, music producer, and musician
- James Webster, several people
- Jean Webster (1876–1916), American writer
- Jean Webster (cook) (1935–2011), American soup kitchen operator
- Jeff Webster (born 1971), American basketball player
- Jeff Webster (checkers player), American checkers player
- Jerome Pierce Webster (1888–1974), American plastic surgeon, professor, and historian of medicine
- J. J. Webster, American politician
- John Webster, several people
- John Dodsley Webster, English architect based in Sheffield
- John Ray Webster, American checkers player and military officer
- Jonah Moorehouse Webster, Canadian politician
- Ken Webster, multiple people
- Kenneth Athol Webster (1906–1967), New Zealand ethnographic dealer and collector
- Kenneth G. T. Webster (1871–1942), Canadian-born American literary scholar
- Kieren Webster (born 1986), bassist with Scottish band The View
- Leslie Webster (art historian) (born 1943), British Anglo-Saxon specialist at the British Museum
- Leslie Webster (Australian politician) (1891–1975), politician with the Country Party in Victoria
- Makenna Webster (born 2002), American ice hockey player
- Malcolm Webster (murderer), Englishman
- Margaret Webster (1905–1972), American-born British actress and director
- Mark Webster, several people
- Martell Webster, American basketball player
- Mary Webster, several people
- Mike Webster, American football player
- Milton P. Webster (1887–1965), American trade union functionary
- Miriam Webster, Australian musician and worship leader
- Mitch Webster, baseball player
- Neil Leslie Webster (1906–1990), British Army officer who worked in intelligence in World War II and radio
- Nate Webster, American football player
- Nesta Helen Webster (1876–1960), English author and far-right conspiracy theorist who promoted antisemitic canards
- Nicholas Webster (1912–2006), American film and television director
- Nicole Webster (born 1973), Australian marine scientist
- Nikki Webster (born 1987), Australian singer
- Noah Webster (1758–1843), American lexicographer, creator of Webster's Dictionary
- Noel Webster (1931–1992), Australian footballer
- Norman Webster (1941–2021), Canadian journalist and editor-in-chief of The Globe and Mail and The Gazette
- Nsimba Webster (born 1996), American football player
- Paul Webster, several people
- Pearl Webster (1889–1918), American baseball player
- Philip Webster, British journalist
- Ray Webster (first baseman) (born 1942), American baseball player
- Ray Webster (second baseman) (1937–2020), American baseball player
- Renée Webster, Australian filmmaker
- Richard Webster (rugby), Welsh rugby player
- Robert Webster, several people
- Roger Webster, English cornet player
- Ron Webster, English football player
- Simon Webster (footballer) (born 1964), English footballer
- Simon Webster (rugby union), Scottish rugby player
- Terry Webster (1930–2016), English footballer
- Thomas Webster (painter), English painter
- Thomas Webster (geologist), Scottish geologist
- Victor Webster, Canadian actor
- Wally Webster (1895–1980), English footballer
- Walter Ernest Webster (1877–1959), British painter and illustrator
- W. D. Webster (1868–1913), British ethnographic dealer and collector
- William Webster, several people

== Fictional characters ==
- Nina Webster, a fictional character in The Young and the Restless, an American soap opera
- The Webster family, a group of characters featured in the British soap opera Coronation Street:
  - Alison Webster (Coronation Street)
  - Bill Webster
  - Debbie Webster
  - Jack Webster (Coronation Street)
  - Jake Webster (Coronation Street)
  - Kevin Webster
  - Maureen Webster
  - Rosie Webster
  - Sally Webster
  - Sophie Webster

== See also ==
- Webster (disambiguation)
- Webber (disambiguation)
- Weber (disambiguation)
