= William Webster =

William Webster may refer to:

== Sportsmen ==
- William Webster (baseball) (1896–?), American Negro leagues baseball player
- William Webster (cricketer, born 1876) (1876–1948), Scottish cricketer
- William Webster (cricketer, born 1880) (1880–1931), English cricketer
- William Webster (cricketer, born 1910) (1910–1986), English cricketer, footballer, stockbroker and administrator
- Billy Webster (1909–?), English soccer player
- Bill Webster (American football) (1903–1981), American football player

== Law and politics ==
- William L. Webster (born 1953), former Missouri state representative and attorney general
- William Webster (Australian politician) (1860–1936), Australian politician
- William Maule McDowell Webster (1885–1958), Australian trade unionist and NSW Labor Party president
- William H. Webster (1924–2025), American judge, FBI director and CIA director
- William Bennett Webster (1798–1861), doctor, amateur geologist and political figure in Nova Scotia, Canada
- William Gourlay Webster (1884–1965), civil engineer, surveyor and politician in Ontario, Canada

== Others ==
- William Webster (theologian) (1689–1758), British clergyman
- W. D. Webster (William Downing Webster, 1868–1913), British dealer in ethnographic art
- William Webster (engineer), American engineer, recipient of the John Fritz Medal
- William Webster (builder) (1819–1888), English builder
- William Webster (chemical engineer) (1855–1910), son of English builder, scientist involved in development of x-rays
- William Webster (dean of Aberdeen and Orkney) (1810–1896)
- William G. Webster (born 1951), United States Army officer
- William Henry Webster (1850–1931), priest and malacologist in New Zealand
- William M. Webster, businessman and writer from South Carolina
- Bill Webster, a fictional character from the British soap opera Coronation Street
