= The Conservatoire =

Educational charity in London, England

The Blackheath Conservatoire of Music and the Arts
- Founded: 1881
- Founder: William Webster
- Type: Educational charity
- Tax ID no.: 1072627
- Purpose: Music, Art and Drama
- Location: 19–21 Lee Road, Blackheath, London, SE3 9RQ, UK
- Coordinates: 51°27′52.7″N 0°0′33.6″E
- Origins: Blackheath School of Music and Blackheath School of Art
- Region served: London
- Website: www.conservatoire.org.uk

The Conservatoire (formally The Blackheath Conservatoire of Music and the Arts) is an educational charity in Blackheath, on the border of the London boroughs of Greenwich and Lewisham. The Conservatoire of Music and the Arts took on its current structure in 1991 with the merger of the Blackheath Conservatoire of Music and the Blackheath School of Art, which until that point had operated separately on the adjoining sites, but under the same board.

The Conservatoire is so called as it was a generic term for a music school at the time of its establishment, but it is not one in the present sense of a higher education establishment dedicated to music, and does not award its own qualifications. It does, however, offer GCSEs and A-levels, along with graded music exams.

The Conservatoire offers classes in art, music and drama for adults and children.

== History ==
=== Blackheath Conservatoire of Music (1881–1991) ===
The Conservatoire of Music was founded by a local group led by William Webster (son of wealthy building contractor William Webster) in 1881, and operated out of temporary premises on nearby Bennett Park until the completion of its building in 1896. Unlike the School of Art, it has taught continuously since its founding.

=== Blackheath School of Art (1896–1991) ===
The School of Art was taken over by the Army during World War II, and remained in government hands as office accommodation. In 1985, it was reopened as an art school, but proved financially unsustainable and was absorbed into the Conservatoire of Music.

=== Post-merger: The Conservatoire (1991–present) ===
The combined organisation expanded beyond music and art to include drama and cultural courses. It also expanded beyond the site to engage in partnerships with other bodies, such as the University of Greenwich, Christ the King Sixth Form College and Oxleas NHS Foundation Trust.

=== Closure threat ===
In January 2013 the Conservatoire was threatened with closure because of funding difficulties.

== Buildings ==
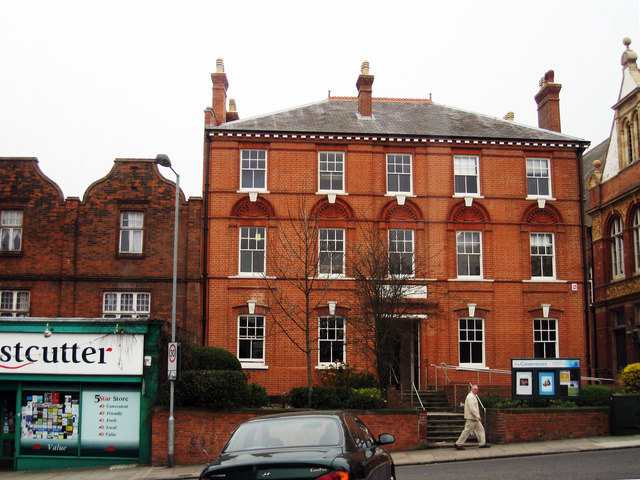
Conservatoire building frontage

Both the Conservatoire of Music building and School of Art building were completed in 1896. The architects were James Edmeston and Edward Gabriel. Both buildings are now Grade II-listed. Adjoining these buildings is Blackheath Halls.

It is believed to be the oldest purpose built multi-arts building in London and one of the few to have a fully operational Victorian life drawing studio.

== Notable students and teachers ==
- Douglas Percy Bliss
- York Bowen
- Cecil Ross Burnett
- George Bertram Carter
- Stephen Coombs
- Nora Cundell
- Harry Farjeon
- Eric Gill
- Reginald King
- James Laver
- Decima Moore
- Heddle Nash
- George Newson
- John Platt
- Violet Sanders
- Norman Sillman
- John Skeaping
- Sidney Torch
- Harold Truscott
- Fatimah Tuggar
- Gary Oldman
- Jools Holland
- Kate Bush
- Daniel Day-Lewis
- Eska Mtungwazi
- Dorothy M. Wheeler
