= Webster Pass =

Webster Pass may refer to:

- Webster Pass (Antarctica), a snow pass in Marie Byrd Land.
- Webster Pass (Colorado), a mountain pass on the Continental Divide of the Americas in the Front Range of Colorado, United States

== See also ==
- Webster (disambiguation)
- List of mountain passes
