= Webster =

Webster may refer to:

== People ==
- Webster (surname), including a list of people with the surname
- Webster (given name), including a list of people with the given name

== Places ==
=== Canada ===
- Webster, Alberta
- Webster's Falls, Hamilton, Ontario

=== United States ===
- Webster, California, in Yolo County
- Webster, San Diego, California, a neighborhood
- Webster, Florida, a city
- Webster, Hancock County, Illinois, an unincorporated community
- Webster, Iroquois County, Illinois, an unincorporated community
- Webster, Indiana, a census-designated place
- Webster, Iowa, a city
- Webster, Madison County, Iowa, an unincorporated community
- Webster City, Iowa, a city
- Webster, Kansas, an unincorporated community
- Webster, Kentucky, an unincorporated community
- Webster Parish, Louisiana
- Sabattus, Maine, a town formerly known as Webster, Maine
- Webster Plantation, Maine, a plantation
- Webster, Massachusetts, a town
  - Webster (CDP), Massachusetts, the town center
- Webster, Michigan, an unincorporated community
- Webster, Minnesota, an unincorporated community
- Webster, Nebraska, an unincorporated community
- Webster, New Hampshire, a town
- Webster, New York, a town
  - Webster (village), New York, in the town of Webster
- Webster, North Carolina, a town
- Webster, North Dakota, an unincorporated community
- Webster, Ohio, an unincorporated community
- Webster, Putnam County, Ohio, a ghost town
- Webster, South Dakota, a city
- Webster, Texas, a city
- Webster, Virginia, an unincorporated community
- Webster, West Virginia, an unincorporated community
- Webster, Burnett County, Wisconsin, a village
- Webster, Vernon County, Wisconsin, a town
- Webster Avenue, The Bronx, New York
- Webster County (disambiguation)
- Webster Groves, Missouri, a city
- Webster Pass (Colorado), a mountain pass
- Webster Reservoir, a reservoir in Kansas
- Webster Springs, West Virginia, a town
- Webster Theater, Hartford, Connecticut
- Webster Township (disambiguation)
- Mount Webster, a mountain in the White Mountains of New Hampshire

=== Antarctica ===
- Mount Webster (Antarctica)
- Webster Glacier
- Webster Knob, Queen Maud Mountains
- Webster Peaks (Prince Charles Mountains)

== Education ==
- Webster College, Pasco County, Florida, acquired by Rasmussen College
- Daniel Webster College, a defunct college in Nashua, New Hampshire
- Webster Graduate School, London
- Webster Grammar School, Auburn, Maine
- Webster High School (Tulsa, Oklahoma)
- Webster University, a liberal arts university in Webster Groves, Missouri, with satellite campuses worldwide

== Other ==
- Webster (TV series), a television sitcom starring Emmanuel Lewis
- Webster Bank, a bank based in Waterbury, Connecticut
  - Webster Bank Arena, a previous name of the Total Mortgage Arena in Bridgeport, Connecticut
- Webster's Brewery, a former brewer in Yorkshire, England
- Webster's Dictionary, any of several dictionaries edited by Noah Webster
- Webster Hotel, New York City
- Webster Limited, Australian business
- Webster ruling, test case in association football law
- Webster v. Reproductive Health Services, 492 U.S. 490 (1989)
- The Webster, luxury multi-brand fashion house
- Webster & Sheffield, a law firm in New York City
- A specific martial arts trick and related variants
- A (British) Military slang for mismatched, worn out and poorly designed kit and equipment
- Webster/Sainte-Laguë method, a method of producing proportional representation
