= John Webster (disambiguation) =

John Webster (c. 1580–c. 1634) was an English dramatist and contemporary of William Shakespeare.

John Webster or Jack Webster is also the name of:

== Politics ==
- John Webster (governor) (1590–1661), Governor of the Colony of Connecticut
- John Webster (MP) (1810–1891), Member of Parliament for Aberdeen
- John Webster (Canadian politician) (1856–1928), Member of Parliament and Senator
- John R. Webster, Speaker of the North Carolina House of Representatives in 1887
- J. Stanley Webster (1877–1962), American politician and judge, U.S. Representative from Washington
- John M. Webster (1877–1963), American mayor of Somerville, Massachusetts

== Sports ==
- Chick Webster (John Robert Webster, 1920–2018), ice hockey player
- Jack Webster (cricketer) (1917–1997), English cricketer
- John Webster (footballer) (fl. 1889–1898), English footballer
- John Ray Webster (born 1942), American checkers player

== Other people ==
- John Webster (minister) (1610–1682), English clergyman and controversial writer
- John Webster (mycologist) (1925–2014), English mycologist and professor at University of Exeter
- John Webster (orator) (1913–2008), a.k.a. Mohammed Jonn Webster, Anglo/Australian speaker and soap box activist
- John White Webster (1793–1850), Harvard University professor convicted of killing colleague George Parkman
- John Webster (engineer) (1845–1914), English civil engineer and bridge designer
- John Webster (doctor) (born 1936), pioneer in the field of IVF, obstetrician and gynaecologist
- John P. Webster, Canadian Bank Executive and Senior Liberal Party Adviser
- John Clarence Webster (1863–1950), Canadian physician and historian
- John Dodsley Webster (1840–1913), English architect
- John Webster (Royal Navy officer) (1932–2020), British admiral
- John Webster (musician) (born 1957), Canadian musician, engineer and producer who primarily plays keyboards
- John Webster (organist) (1914–1974), English classical organist and professor
- John G. Webster, pioneer of the field of biomedical engineering
- John Adams Webster (1789–1877), U.S. Navy officer
- Jack Webster (Scottish journalist) (John Barron Webster, 1931–2020)
- Jack Webster (Scottish-Canadian journalist) (John Edgar Webster, 1918–1999)
- Jack Webster (police officer) (1923–2002), police officer, administrator and police historian in Toronto, Canada
- John Webster (theologian) (1955–2016), British Anglican systematic theologian
- John D. Webster (died 1887), state legislator, government official, and lawyer in Mississippi

== Fictional characters ==
- John Webster (The Inbetweeners)

== See also ==
- Jack Webster (disambiguation)
