= Jack Webster =

Jack Webster may refer to:

- Jack Webster (Scottish-Canadian journalist) (1918–1999), Scottish-born Canadian journalist, radio and television personality
- Jack Webster (Scottish journalist) (1931–2020), writer
- Jack Webster (police officer) (1923–2002), police officer, administrator and police historian in Toronto, Canada
- Jack Webster (cricketer) (1917–1997), English cricketer
- Jack Webster (Coronation Street), a character on the TV series Coronation Street
- Jack Webster (rower) (1917-2005), Australian Olympic rower
- Eddie Webster (1902−1945), British Olympic athlete also known as Jack Webster

== See also ==
- John Webster (disambiguation)
