= St Margaret's, Lee =

Church in southeast London

Coordinates: 51°27.77′N 0°0.05′E

St. Margaret of Antioch
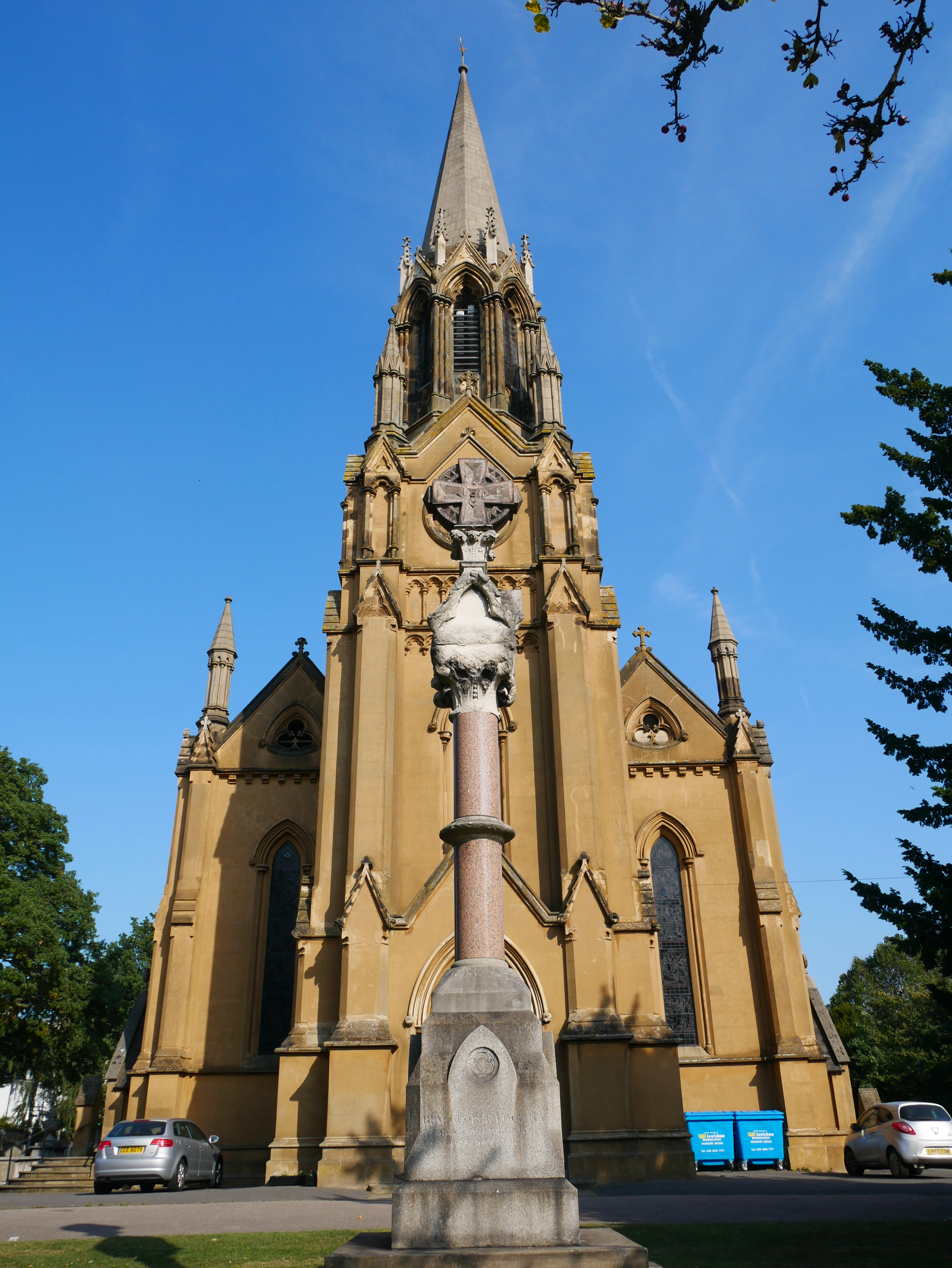
- St. Margaret of Antioch, Lee Green, south east London
- St. Margaret of Antioch
- Denomination: Church of England
- Churchmanship: Broad Church
- Website: www.stmargaretslee.org.uk

History
- Dedication: St. Margaret of Antioch

Administration
- Province: Canterbury
- Diocese: Southwark
- Parish: St Margaret of Antioch, Lee

Clergy
- Rector: Revd Canon Timothy Goode

St. Margaret's Church, Lee, is a Church of England parish church located on the south side of Lee Terrace/Belmont Hill, in Lee Green, south-east London.

== History ==
The current church replaced an earlier church built on the foundations of an older mediaeval church dating to around 1120. Between 1813 and 1830, an attempt to rebuild the medieval church, involving the architect Joseph Gwilt, failed when it became clear that the old church's foundations could not support a new building. The ruins of the original building are in the medieval churchyard on the north side of Lee Terrace.

The existing church was built between 1839 and 1841 in a simple early Victorian style (to a design by Norwich architect John Brown). Extensive and lavish interior decoration was carried out between the years of 1875 and 1900. By 1980 it had fallen into dilapidation and an extensive 20-year restoration programme was carried out. On completion of the restoration, the church is one of the best preserved examples of a decorated gothic revivalist interior in London.

== Churchyards ==
The tomb of Edmond Halley (1656–1742), from 1720 England's second Astronomer Royal and the discoverer of the periodicity of Halley's Comet is in the churchyard, one of three Astronomers Royal buried at St. Margaret's (Nathaniel Bliss and John Pond are the others). Also notable is the tomb of Sir Samuel Fludyer, 1st Baronet and his family. James Annesley, a celebrated claimant to the Earldom of Anglesey, was buried in the churchyard in an unmarked grave. After restoration work, six tombs in the old churchyard were moved from the 'at risk' register of Historic England in November 2025.

Graves in the churchyard around the current church include one for wealthy builder William Webster (1819 –1888) , his wife, and chemical engineer son, William who lived at nearby Wyberton House on Lee Terrace.

== Gallery ==
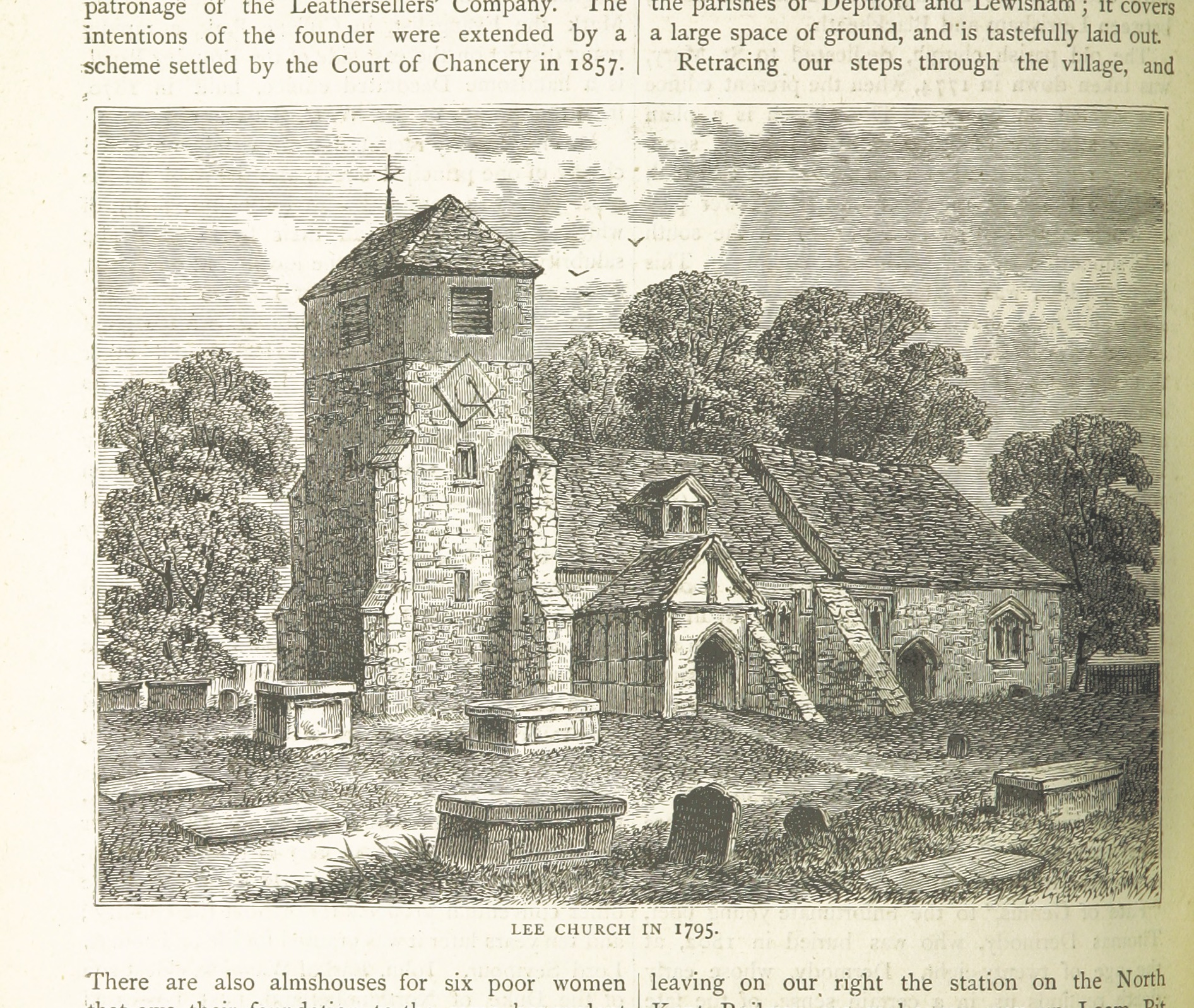
Lee church in 1795

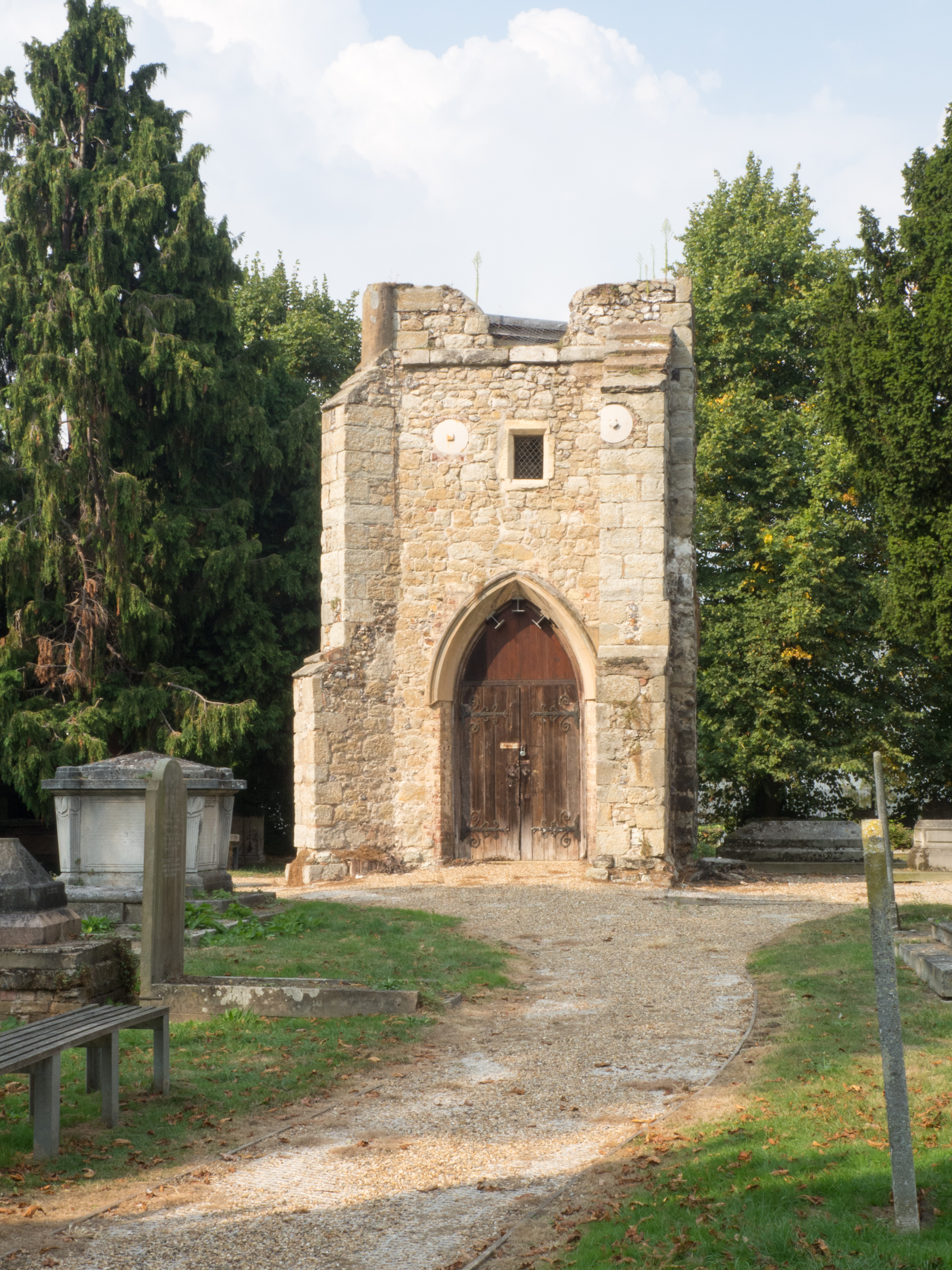
Remains of tower of former Church of St Margaret in old churchyard

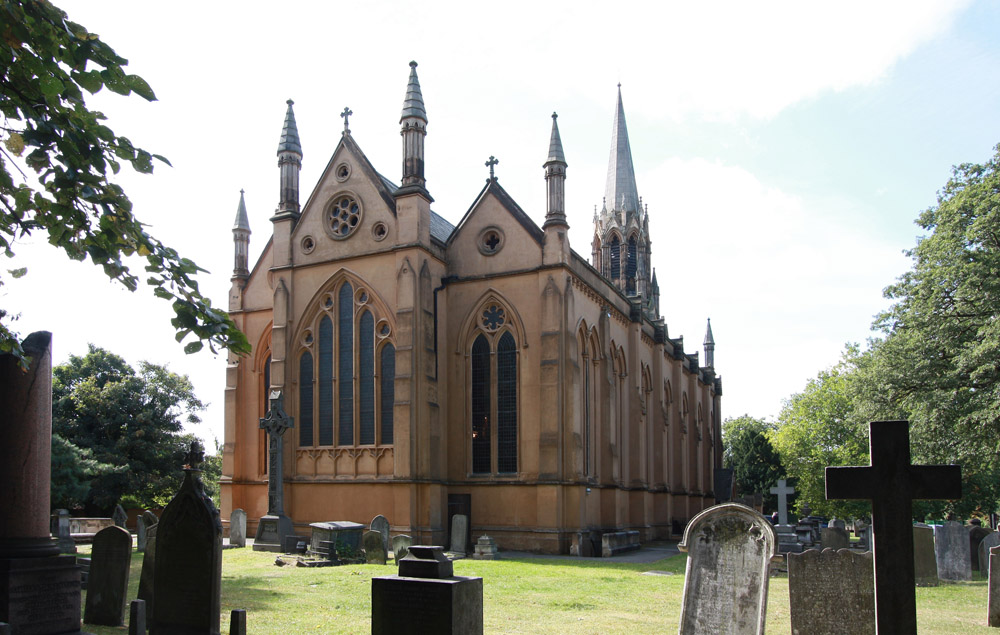
St Margaret's exterior - East end

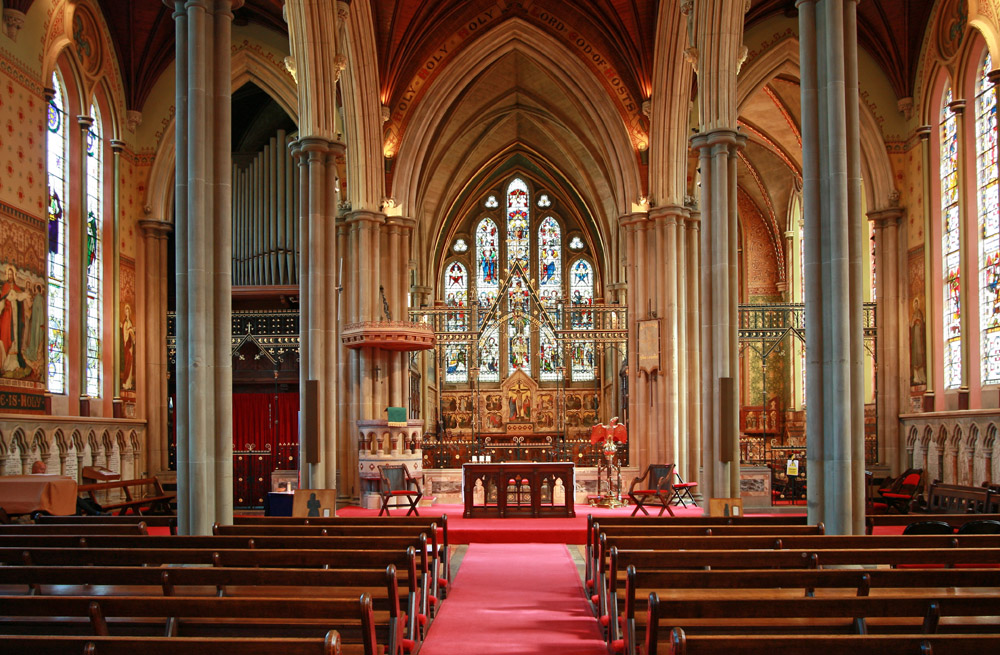
St Margaret's interior - East end

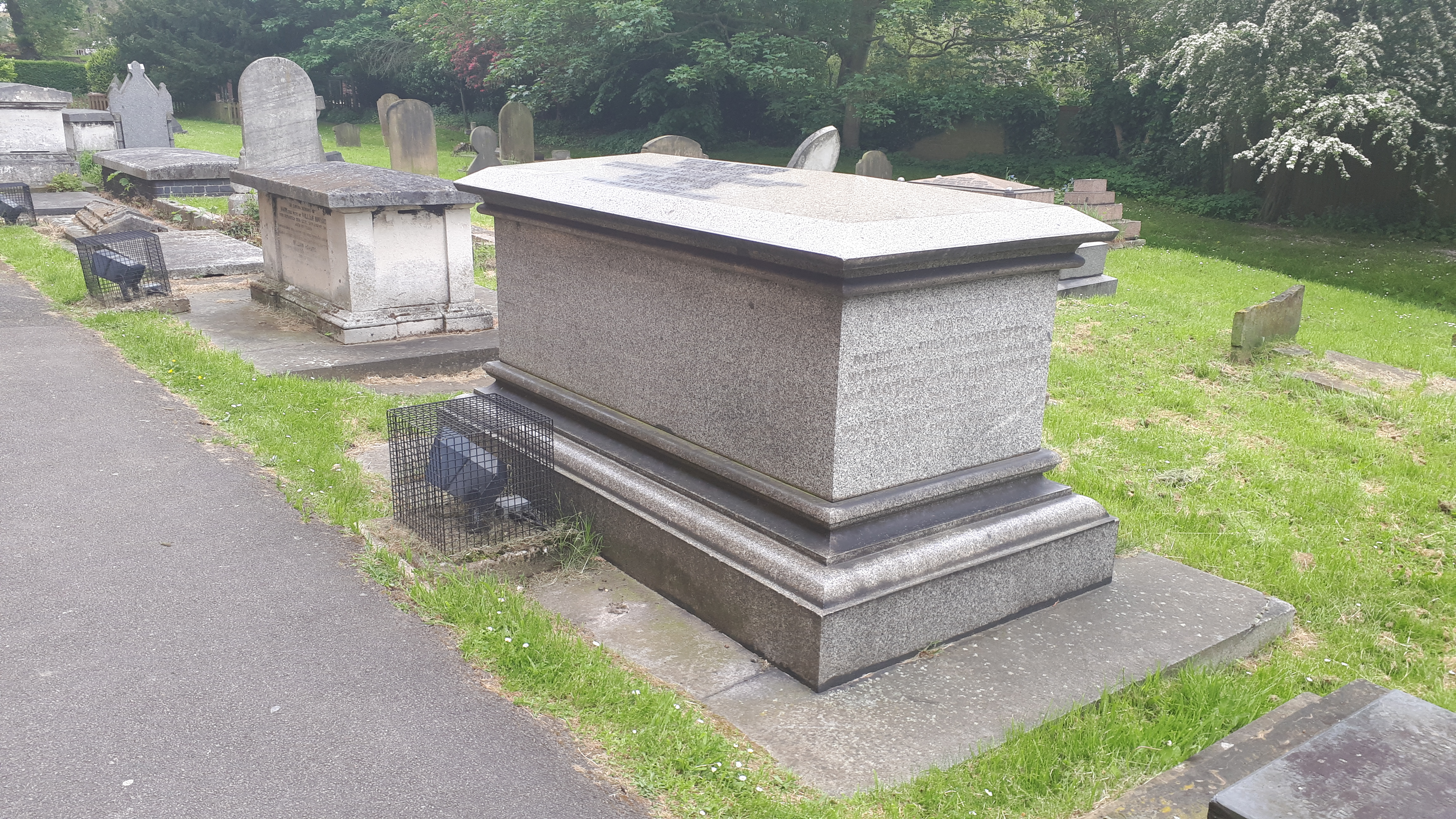
Webster's grave in new churchyard

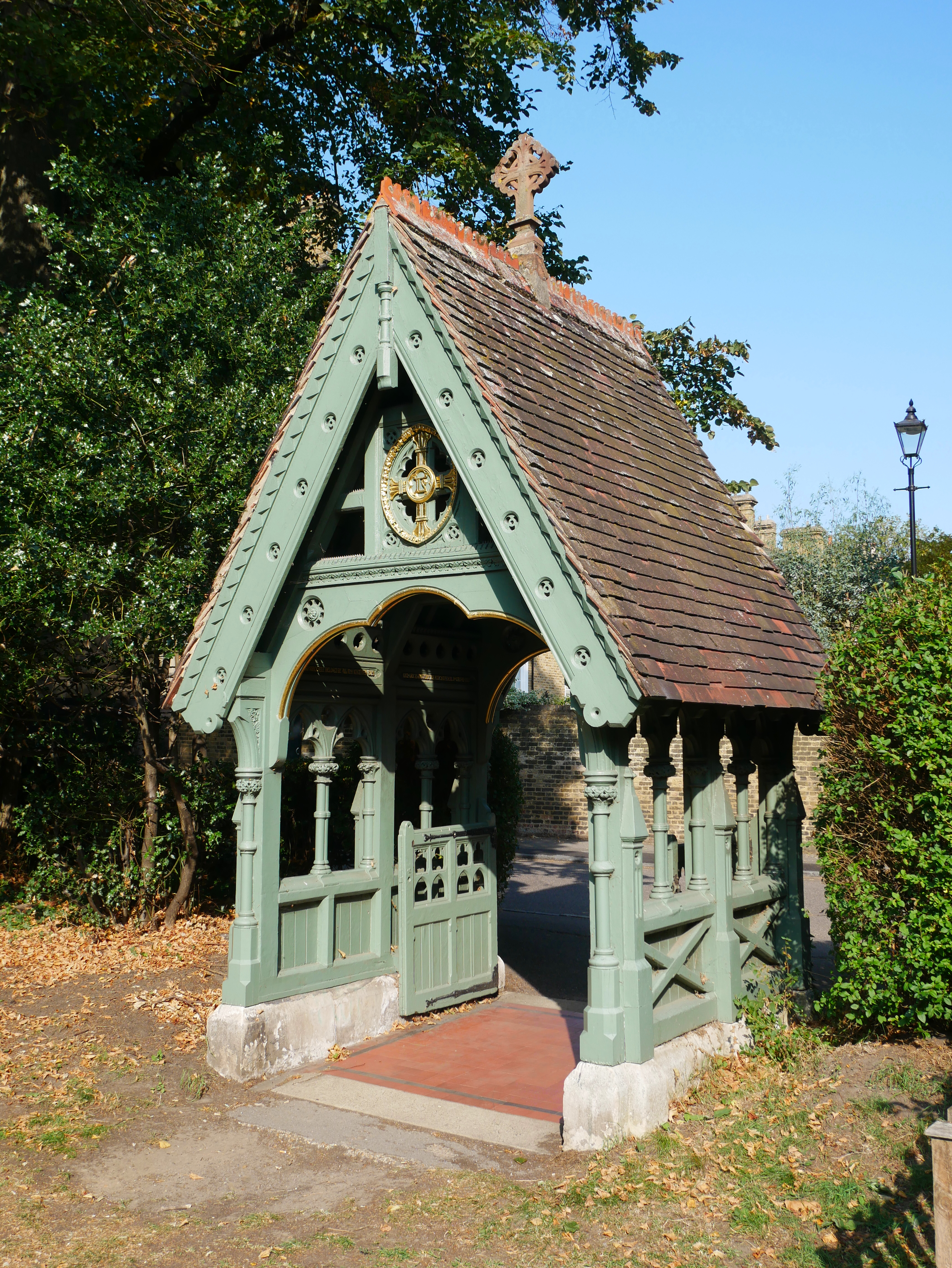
Lychgate
