= John Platt (artist) =

English painter (1886–1967)

- Born: 19 March 1886; Leek, Staffordshire, England
- Died: 29 April 1967 (aged 81); Eastbourne, England
- Education: Margate Art School; Leek School of Art; Royal College of Art
- Known for: Printmaking, Painting, drawing

John Edgar Platt (19 March 1886 – 29 April 1967) was an English painter, woodcut artist and designer of stained glass. His work was part of the art competitions at the 1928 Summer Olympics and the 1948 Summer Olympics.

== Early life ==
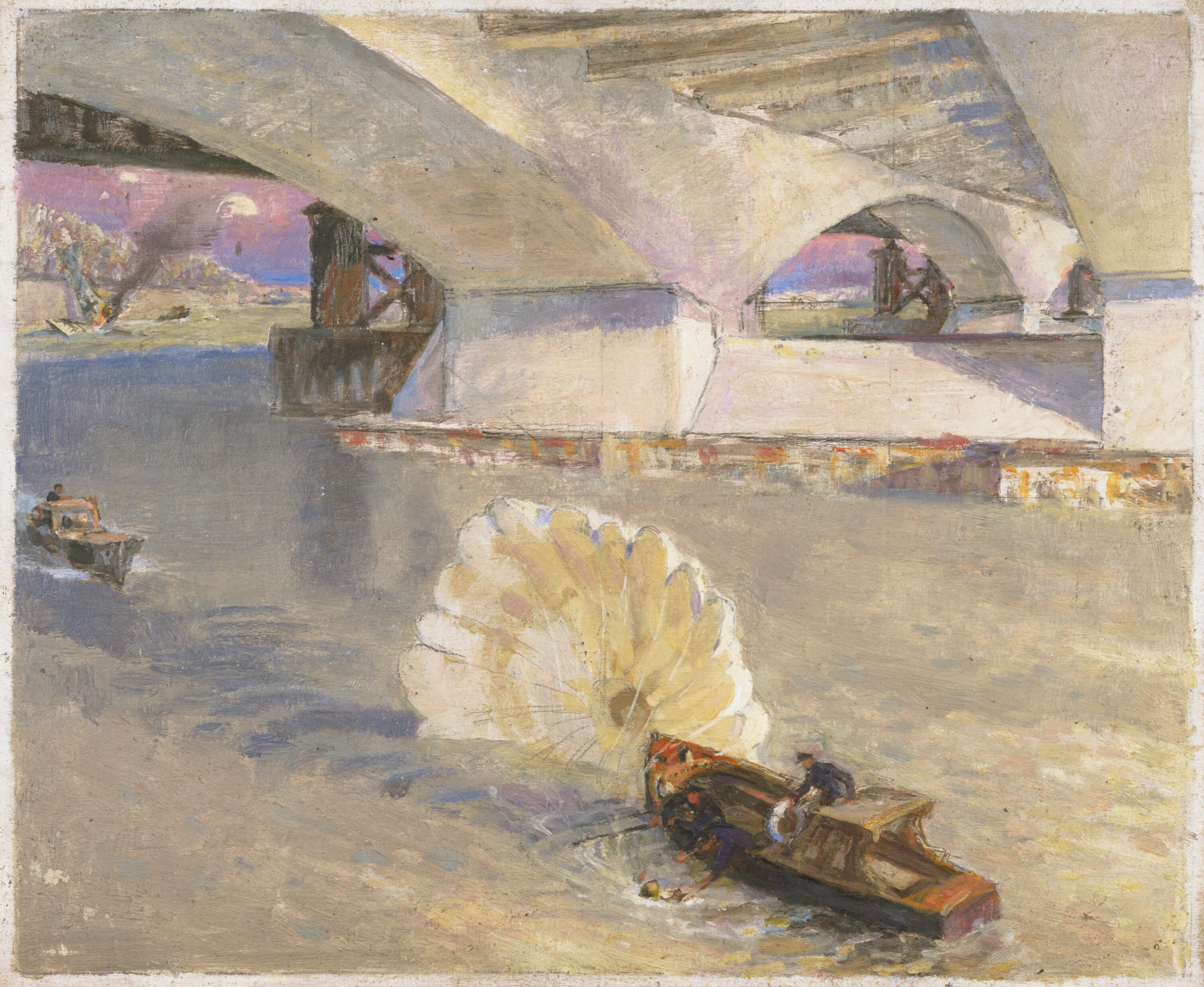
War-time traffic on the River Thames, River Police at Waterloo Bridge during the Battle of Britain (1942) (Art.IWM ART LD 2642)

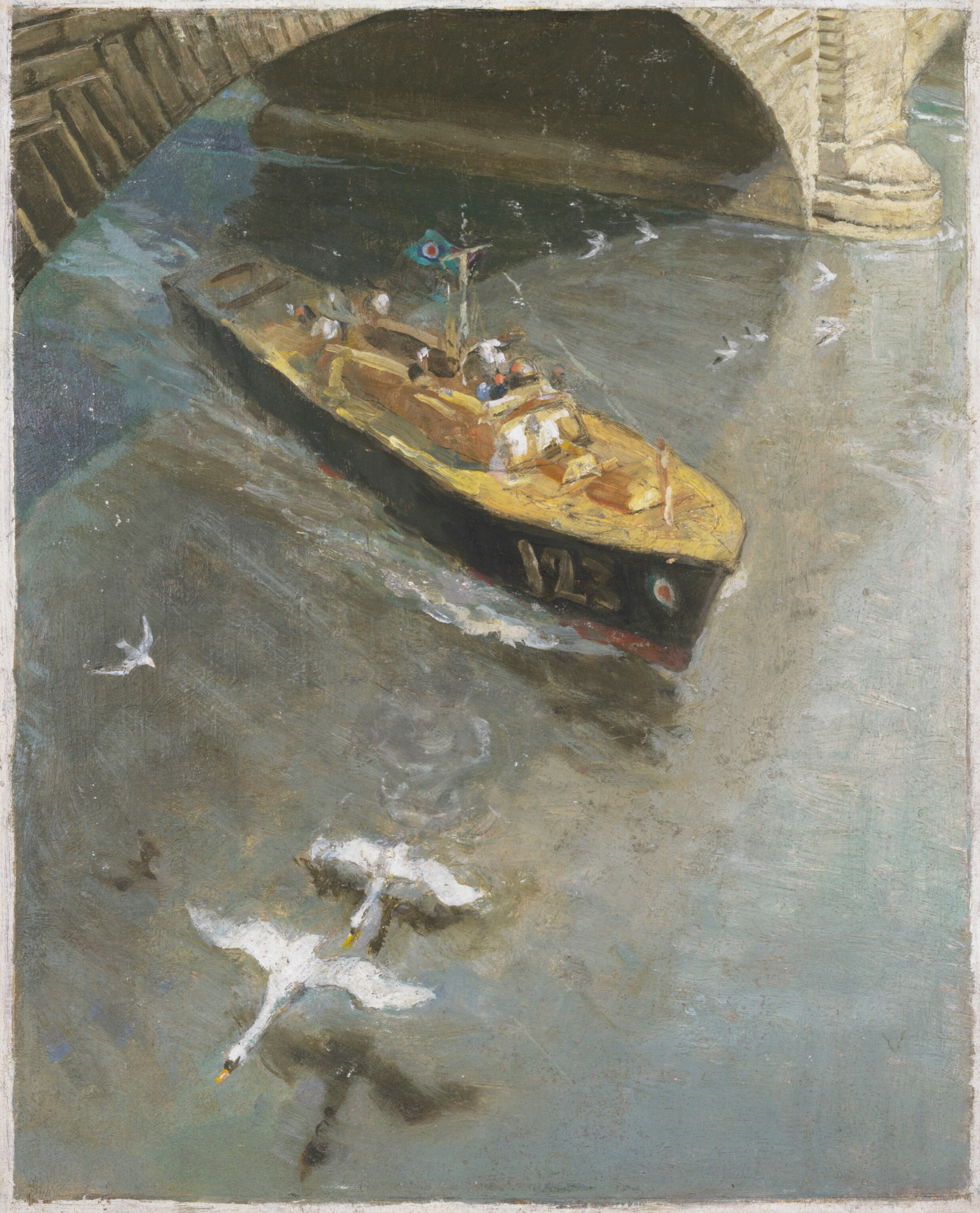
War-time traffic on the River Thames, RAF Sea-rescue Launch, London Bridge (1942) (Art.IWM ART LD 2643)

Platt was born in Leek, Staffordshire, the son of local hotel owners. He was educated at the High School, Newcastle Under Lyme and at Margate Art School and the Leek School of Art before going to study at the Royal College of Art from 1905 to 1908. After graduating he worked as the head of Leek School of Art for nine years until 1919. Platt quickly developed his skills in oil painting, watercolours, woodcuts and engraved woodblocks and held his first exhibition at the Royal Academy in 1913. Between 1913 and 1916 he worked on the interior design of All Saints in Leek, producing stained glass, tapestry designs and murals for the church. In 1917 Platt exhibited at the International Society of Sculptors and at the Arts and Craft Society. Two of his best known prints, Snow in Springtime (1919) and The Giant Stride (1918) are from this period. Towards the end of World War I, he served in the Royal Army Service Corps.

== Teaching career ==
After the war Platt exhibited at the New English Art Club, for the British Council and in 1922 won a gold medal at the International Print Makers' Exhibition organised by the California Society of Printmakers. As well as designing several posters for London Underground, he continued to teach. Platt taught at the Harrogate School of Art throughout 1919, the Derby School of Art in 1920 and was head of the Department of Fine Art at Edinburgh College of Art between 1920 and 1923, before becoming Principal of the Leicester School of Art from 1923 until 1929, when he moved to London to become head of Blackheath School of Art. Throughout the 1930s, whilst teaching at Blackheath, Platt produced a number of highly regarded woodcuts, prints and seascapes. He published numerous articles and the book Colour Woodcuts: a Book of Reproductions and a Handbook of Method,(1938). From 1938 till 1953, Platt was the president of the Society of Graver Painters in Colour.

== World War II ==
During World War II, a number of paintings by Platt were purchased by the War Artists' Advisory Committee and in 1943 he was awarded a full-time contract to produce paintings for the Ministry of War Transport. Over the next year he painted scenes of river traffic, the maritime rescue services, ocean transport, docks and marshalling yards. He mostly worked on and around the Thames in London from a studio in Putney, but he also visited Liverpool and Cornwall to complete his commission.

== Legacy ==
After World War II, Platt held a single major exhibition, Fifty Years of the Colour Print at Kensington in 1947, before he retired to Eastbourne in 1950. Examples of Platts wartime work are held in the collections of both the Imperial War Museum and the National Maritime Museum, whilst the British Museum holds some of his earlier prints. Platt's The Port of St Tropaz is held by the Tate. The Metropolitan Museum of Art in New York also has examples. After his death, his family donated his print-making tools to the Victoria and Albert Museum.
