= Webster Township, Indiana =

Webster Township, Indiana may refer to one of the following places:

- Webster Township, Harrison County, Indiana
- Webster Township, Wayne County, Indiana

See also

- Webster Township (disambiguation)
