= Webber Township =

Webber Township may refer to the following places:

- Webber Township, Jefferson County, Illinois
- Webber Township, Lake County, Michigan

See also

- Webber (disambiguation)
