= Daniel Webster (disambiguation) =

Daniel Webster was a 19th-century American politician who served as Secretary of State.

Daniel or Dan Webster may also refer to:

- Daniel Webster Davis (1862–1913), American educator, minister and poet
- Daniel Webster Whittle (1840–1901), author of a number of popular Christians hymns
- Dan Webster (baseball) (1912–1988), American baseball player
- Daniel Webster (1932–2018), chief music critic of The Philadelphia Inquirer, 1963-1999
- Daniel Webster (Florida politician) (born 1949), U.S. representative for Florida's 11th District
- Daniel Webster (academic) (born 1960), director of the Center for Gun Policy and Research at Johns Hopkins University
- Daniel K. Webster (born 1964), former member of the Massachusetts House of Representatives

== See also ==
- List of things named for Daniel Webster
