= Robert Webster =

Robert Webster may refer to:

- Robert Webster (virologist) (born 1932), New Zealand avian influenza expert
- Sir Robert Webster (politician) (born 1951), Australian company director, grazier, parliamentarian and chancellor of University of New South Wales
- Robert K. Webster (born 1938), American phytopathologist
- Robert M. Webster (1892–1972), United States Air Force major general
- Robert N. Webster, a pseudonym of Raymond A. Palmer
- Robert Webster, footballer, co-founder of Norwich City F.C.
- Robert Edward Webster (1928–1999), American plastics technician who defected to the Soviet Union in 1959, returning in 1962
- Robert Grant Webster, British member of the UK Parliament for St Pancras East
- Bob Webster (born 1938), American Olympic diving champion
