= Mary Webster =

Mary Webster may refer to:

- Mary Webster (alleged witch), accused of witchcraft in the 1680s in Puritan Hadley, Massachusetts
- Mary Webster (British actress) (1935–2014), British actress
- Mary Webster (American actress) (1935–2017), American actress
- Mary Comer Webster (1928–2008), American political strategist
- Mary Morison Webster (1894–1980), Scottish-born novelist and poet
- Mary Hortense Webster (1881–1965), sculptor
- Mary McCallum Webster (1906–1985), British botanist
- Mary Clark Webster, member of the Maine House of Representatives
