= Weber =

Weber may refer to:

== Places ==
=== United States ===
- Weber, Missouri, an unincorporated community
- Weber City, Virginia, a town
- Weber City, Fluvanna County, Virginia, an unincorporated community
- Weber County, Utah
- Weber Canyon, Utah
- Weber River, Utah
- Weber, Wisconsin, an unincorporated community

=== Elsewhere ===
- Weber County, New Zealand
  - Weber, New Zealand, a hamlet within the county
- Weber Deep, the deepest point in the Banda Sea off Indonesia
- Weber Inlet, Alexander Island, Antarctica
- Weber (crater), an impact crater on the far side of the Moon

== People and fictional characters ==
- Weber (surname), including a list of people with the surname
- Carl Maria von Weber (1786-1826), German composer, conductor and pianist
- Max Weber (1864–1920), German sociologist, historian, jurist and political economist
- Weber Yang (born 1980), Taiwanese actor
- Potsie Weber, a fictional character in the sitcom Happy Days

== Businesses ==
- Weber Inc., an American company known for its line of barbecue grills
- Weber Aircraft LLC, an American manufacturer of airline seats
- Weber Carburetors, an Italian fuel system manufacturer
- Weber-Hydraulik, German power-tool company
- Weber Piano Company, a New York City piano manufacturing company from 1852 through the 20th century
- Weber Typefoundry, a defunct German typefoundry in Stuttgart
- Saint-Gobain Weber, a manufacturer of mortars, owned by Saint-Gobain

== American schools ==
- Weber State University, Ogden, Utah
- The Weber School, Sandy Springs, Georgia, a Jewish high school
- Weber High School, Pleasant View, Utah
- Weber High School (Chicago), Illinois, a former Roman Catholic all-boys' school

== Other uses ==
- Weber (journal), an American literary magazine
- Weber (unit) (Wb), SI derived unit of magnetic flux in electromagnetism
- USS Weber, a destroyer escort which served in World War II
- Weber Cup, an annual men's ten-pin bowling competition between Europe and the United States
- Weber test, a medical test for hearing loss

== See also ==
- Weber House (disambiguation)
- Weber Manuscript, a collection of nine, possibly eleven, incomplete ancient Indian treatises
- Weber electrodynamics, in physics a historical alternative to Maxwell electrodynamics
- Weber–Fechner law, which quantifies stimulus and perception
- South Weber, Utah
- Webers, a hamburger restaurant in Orillia, Ontario, Canada
- Weber's syndrome, in medicine a type of stroke
- Webber (surname), an English variant
- Webber (disambiguation)
- Weaver (disambiguation), an English variant
- Wever (disambiguation), a Dutch variant
