= Webster (given name) =

Webster is sometimes used as a given name. Notable people with the given name include:

- Webster Anderson (1933–2003), American soldier and recipient of the Medal of Honor
- Webster Hubbell (born 1948), Arkansas lawyer and politician associated with Bill Clinton
- Webster Paulson (1837–1887), English civil engineer
- Webster Slaughter (born 1964), former American football player in the National Football League
- Webster Tarpley (born 1946), American author, journalist, lecturer, and critic of US foreign and domestic policy
- Webster White (1860–1923), American politician from Maryland
- Webster Young (1932–2003), American jazz musician

== See also ==
- Webster (surname), including a list of people with the surname
