= Violet Sanders =

British artist

- Born: 13 March 1904; Mexico City
- Died: 1983 (aged 78–79)
- Education: Blackheath School of Art; Harrow Technical School; Willesden Polytechnic
- Known for: Painting

Violet E. C. Sanders, later Violet Sanders Mallet, (13 March 1904 – 1983) was a British artist who painted in both oil and watercolours and was a wood engraver and clay modeller. She was also a heraldic artist and illustrator.

== Biography ==
Sanders was born in Mexico City, where her British father worked for the Shell oil company, and was educated in Britain. She attended the Blackheath School of Art during 1922 and 1923 then spent two years at Harrow Technical School before studying at Willesden Polytechnic from 1925 to 1928. During World War II Sanders worked as a map maker for both the British Cabinet Office and the War Office and helped prepare the maps used for the D-Day landings. During her career she exhibited regularly at the Royal Academy in London, with the Society of Graphic Art and the Society of Women Artists. For many years Sanders lived at Perranporth in Cornwall.
