= Nora Cundell =

English painter (1889-1948)

Nora Lucy Mowbray Cundell
- Born: 20 May 1889; London, England
- Died: 3 August 1948 (aged 59); London, England
- Education: Blackheath School of Art; Westminster Technical Institute; Slade School of Art
- Known for: Painting

Nora Lucy Mowbray Cundell (20 May 1889 – 3 August 1948) was an English painter of figure subjects, flowers and landscapes in oil and watercolours.

== Biography ==
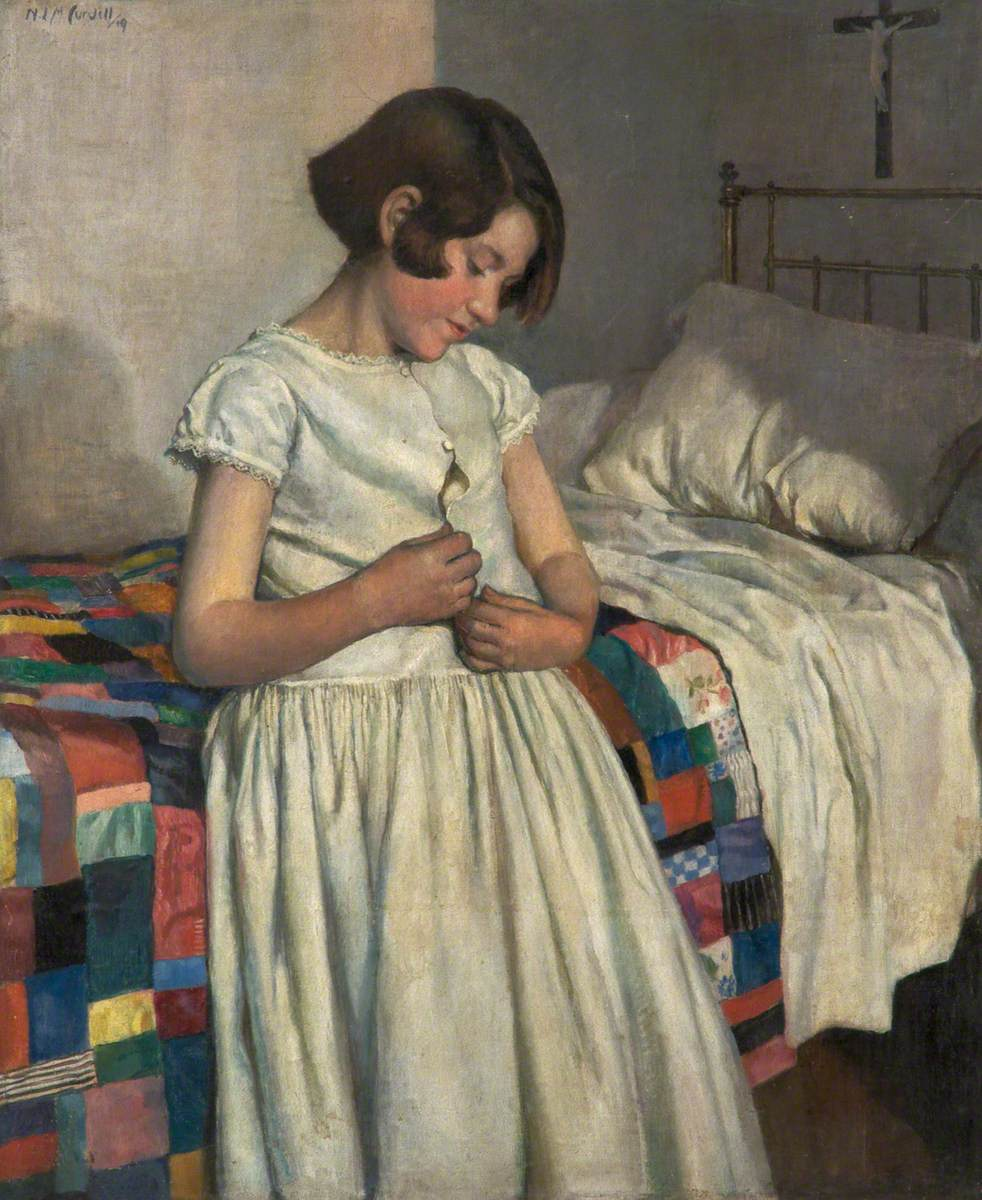
The Patchwork Quilt, 1919, Touchstones Rochdale.

Cundell was born in London and was the granddaughter of the artist Henry Cundell. She attended the Blackheath School of Art and the Westminster Technical Institute where she was taught by Walter Sickert. Cundell studied part-time at the Slade School of Art from 1911 to 1914, and then again in 1919. At the Slade, she won the Melvill Nettleship Prize for figure composition in 1914.

In 1925, Cundell had her first solo exhibition at the Redfern Gallery in London. Her painting Maggie was exhibited at the salon of the Académie des Beaux-Arts in Paris during 1929. In 1930 Cundell was among the founding members of the National Society of Painters, Sculptors and Gravers/Printmakers. Cundell visited America on a regular basis and in particular painted portraits of Native Americans and also landscapes in Arizona and Colorado. Marble Canyon and the Vermilion Cliffs were among her favourite subjects. She wrote and illustrated the book Unsentimental Journey which was published in 1940 and included accounts of her travels in America, driving coast to coast with stops to go hunting on horseback or visit a rodeo. Among her paintings from these trips were Madonna of the Painted Desert and Badger Creek Rapids, a stretch of the Colorado River, which were both shown at the Royal Academy in 1936.

Cundell became a regular exhibitor at the Royal Academy, and also with the New English Art Club and also showed at the Paris Salon. Her 1922 painting Smiling Woman is held in the Tate collection. Cundell lived for some time at Dorney near Windsor but died in London in 1948 and her ashes were scattered near Lee's Ferry in Arizona. A memorial exhibition was held in 1949 at the Royal Society of British Artists galleries in London.
