= Andrew Webster =

Andrew or Andy Webster may refer to:

- Andrew Webster (cricketer) (born 1959), English cricketer
- Andy Webster (footballer, born 1947), English footballer
- Andy Webster (footballer, born 1982), Scottish footballer
- Andrew Webster (rugby league) (born 1982), Australian rugby league player and coach
- Andrew Webster (sociologist) (1951–2021), English sociologist
