= David Webster =

David Webster may refer to:

== In politics ==
- David C. Webster, Maine state legislator
- David Webster (British politician) (1923–1969), British Conservative member of parliament for Weston-Super-Mare

== In sport ==
- Dave Webster (1937–2006), American football player
- David Webster (cricketer) (born 1946), English cricketer
- David Webster (footballer) (born 1989), Irish professional footballer
- David Webster (rowing) (born 1987), Australian rowing cox
- David P. Webster (1928–2023), Scottish author, historian, and promoter of the Highland games internationally

== In other fields ==
- David Kenyon Webster (1922–1961), American soldier, journalist and author
- David L. Webster (1888–1976), American physicist in early X-ray theory
- David Webster (anthropologist) (1945–1989), South African anthropologist and anti-apartheid activist
- David Webster (architect) (1885–1952), Scottish-Canadian architect
- David Webster (broadcasting executive) (1931-2003), British television producer and executive
- David Webster (opera manager) (1903–1971), British general administrator of the Royal Opera House in London, 1946–1970
- David Webster, Australian TV producer for Ambence Entertainment, creator and writer for Erky Perky
