= Richard Edward Snyder =

American diplomat (1919-2012)

Richard Edward Snyder (December 10, 1919 – January 9, 2012) was a United States Department of State official best known for his role as the senior Moscow consular official handling Lee Harvey Oswald's attempted defection to the Soviet Union in 1959 and return to the US in 1961.

== Background ==
Snyder was born in Newark, New Jersey in 1919. He was awarded the Bronze Star Medal for actions during World War II in Europe, in helping to evacuate his wounded comrades while under enemy fire. He spent 10 years in the United States Army Reserve and retired at the rank of major.

Snyder graduated from Yale University in 1948 and completed a Master's degree in Russian Studies at Harvard University in 1956.

== Career ==
From October 1949 to September 1950 Snyder served in the Central Intelligence Agency; by his own account, he had no further links to the agency after that date, although according to agency records, he was used as a "spotter" at Harvard during his studies there to identify persons of potential interest to the agency.

From 1950 to 1970 Snyder was employed as a United States Department of State Japanese and Russian specialist. Much of Snyder's career was spent in Japan, but after he earned his Master's degree in Russian Studies in 1956, Snyder served as a senior consular official at the U.S. Embassy in Moscow from July 1959 to July 1961. In Moscow he dealt with Lee Harvey Oswald (accepting Oswald's US passport in October 1959 and returning it to him in July 1961), met with the American defector to the USSR Robert Edward Webster on October 17, 1959, and attended the trial of U2 pilot Francis Gary Powers. After returning to Japan, Snyder was later involved in preparing the restoration to Japan of administrative control of the Ryukyu Islands in 1972.
