= William Webster (cricketer, born 1876) =

Scottish cricketer and stockbroker

Personal information
- Full name: William Webster
- Born: 28 June 1876; Aberdeen, Aberdeenshire, Scotland
- Died: 11 November 1948 (aged 72); New Aberdour, Aberdeenshire, Scotland
- Batting: Right-handed
- Bowling: Right-arm fast-medium

Domestic team information
- Years: Team
- 1907–1912: Scotland

Career statistics
Competition	First-class
Matches	5
Runs scored	102
Batting average	12.75
100s/50s	–/1
Top score	65
Balls bowled	429
Wickets	8
Bowling average	26.12
5 wickets in innings	–
10 wickets in match	–
Best bowling	3/30
Catches/stumpings	–/–
- Source: Cricinfo, 4 July 2022

William Webster (28 June 1876 – 11 April 1948) was a Scottish first-class cricketer and stockbroker.

Webster was born at Aberdeen in June 1876. A club cricketer for Aberdeenshire Cricket Club, Webster made his debut for Scotland in first-class cricket against the touring South Africans at Edinburgh in 1907. He played first-class for Scotland until 1912, making five appearances. Playing in the Scottish side as an all-rounder, he scored 102 runs at an average of 12.75; he made one half century, a score of 65 against Ireland in 1909. With his right-arm fast-medium bowling, he took 8 wickets at a bowling average of 26.12, with best figures of 3 for 30. By profession, Webster was a stockbroker. He died in April 1948 at New Aberdour, Aberdeenshire.
