= Andy Webster (footballer, born 1947) =

English footballer

Personal information
- Full name: Andrew Webster
- Date of birth: 18 March 1947 (age 79)
- Place of birth: Colne, England
- Position: Centre forward

Youth career
- Rolls Royce
- Burnley
- Colne Dynamoes
- Clitheroe

Senior career*
Years	Team	Apps	(Gls)
1964–1967	Bradford City	12	(1)
Total		12	(1)
- * Club domestic league appearances and goals

Andrew Webster (born 18 March 1947) is an English former professional footballer who played as a centre forward.

== Career ==
Born in Colne, Webster spent his early career with Rolls-Royce, Burnley, Colne Dynamoes and Clitheroe. He signed for Bradford City from Clitheroe in August 1964. He made 12 league and 2 Football League Cup appearances for the club, before being released in 1967.

== Sources ==
- Frost, Terry (1988). Bradford City A Complete Record 1903–1988. Breedon Books Sport. ISBN 0-907969-38-0.
