= Robert Edward Webster =

American defector

Robert E. Webster
- Born: October 23, 1928; Tiffin, Ohio
- Died: November 11, 1999 (aged 71); New Bedford, Massachusetts

Robert Edward Webster (October 23, 1928 – November 11, 1999) was an American technician of the Cleveland, Ohio-based Rand Development, who defected to the Soviet Union in 1959 and returned to the United States in 1962. Webster was born in Tiffin, Ohio and educated in Pennsylvania. He served in the United States Navy as an electronics specialist.

Webster applied to Rand Development in November 1957 to work as a plastics chemist. In 1959 Webster travelled several times to Moscow for Rand to prepare for the American Exhibition there. During a seven-week stay beginning in May 1959, Webster began dating Vera Platanova, a waitress at the Hotel Ukraine, who was suspected of being a KGB agent.

On July 11, 1959 Webster approached Soviet officials at the exhibition to ask about procedures for a US citizen to remain in the Soviet Union. After several further meetings, including one in which Webster told two Soviet scientists he could help them duplicate the Rand spray gun on show in the exhibition, he was accepted by the Soviets, although posted to work in Leningrad rather than Moscow as he had asked. On October 17 he attended the US Embassy in Moscow (having already sent a postcard), meeting with Richard Edward Snyder. He filled in an "Affidavit for Expatriated Person" form and wrote a resignation letter to Rand. He had left his wife and two children behind.

On January 27, 1960 Webster received a letter from his father stating that his mother had had a nervous breakdown and that he had assumed financial support for Webster's children. Webster then decided to return to the United States, asking the US Embassy in Moscow in May 1960 how to do so. He was told to apply for a Soviet exit visa, which he did, though his application was rejected. Re-applying a year later, he was granted an exit visa in February 1962 and returned to the United States on 20 May, classified as an alien. He left behind his Soviet girlfriend and the daughter he had with her. On his return, James H. Rand, III, President of Rand Development, said he "felt a responsibility" for Webster and would help him to secure employment (though not at Rand).

Webster died in New Bedford, Massachusetts on November 11, 1999. He is buried at the Pine Grove Cemetery in New Bedford, Massachusetts.
