= Gary Webster =

Gary Webster may refer to:

- Gary Webster (actor) (born 1964), English actor
- Gary Webster (engineer), manager of the Toronto Transit Commission in Toronto, Ontario, Canada
- Gary Webster (rugby league) (born 1957), Australian rugby league player
