= Weber-Hydraulik =

German manufacturer of hydraulic components

Weber-Hydraulik GmbH
- Type: GmbH
- Industry: Hydraulic components and systems, rescue equipment, valve technology, electric drive systems
- Founded: 1939; 87 years ago
- Founder: Emil Weber
- Headquarters: Güglingen, Germany
- Key people: Christine Grotz (managing director); Yannick Weber
- Revenue: €297.6 million (2024)
- Number of employees: 1,407 (2024)
- Website: www.webersystems.group

Weber-Hydraulik GmbH (stylised as WEBER-HYDRAULIK GMBH) is a German manufacturer of hydraulic components with its headquarters in Güglingen (Baden-Württemberg) and is owned by the family of its founder Emil Weber. It is the parent company of a corporate group that operates under the name Weber Systems Group. The company is also known under the brands Weber-Hydraulik and Weber Rescue Systems.

The group primarily manufactures hydraulic components and systems for mobile machinery, commercial vehicles and machine tools. In addition, it produces hydraulic rescue equipment (hydraulic cutters and spreaders) as well as apps and online applications used by fire brigades and other emergency services.

== History ==
=== Foundation and growth ===
The company was founded in 1939 to manufacture hydraulic lifting equipment in Stuttgart-Untertürkheim. In 1944, it relocated to Güglingen. In 1965, the company began producing cab tilting systems. From the late 1960s onwards, a separate division for rescue technology developed within the company.

In 1969, a site was opened in Losenstein, Austria, and in 1970 a new production facility in Güglingen was brought into operation. In 1974, production of hydraulic rescue equipment began, which was later marketed under a separate brand.

During this period and in the following years, the company made several acquisitions. These included, among others, the acquisition of Strassacker-Ölhydraulik (1966), Madix (1990), LOG Hydraulik (2007) and Fluid-Team Automationstechnik (2007).

In 2005, a new plant for the manufacture of jacks and cylinders was built in Nowogrodziec. In this context, parts of production were relocated from existing plants and the subsidiary plant in Pirna was closed.

=== Restructuring ===
In 2017, Christine Grotz assumed the management of the family-owned company.

Since 2019, the company has been developing electromechanical rear-axle steering systems for the automotive and commercial vehicle sector. In the same year, the subsidiary Rescue Digital Systems GmbH was established.

As part of a reorganisation of the brand structure, the group’s brands were brought together under the name Weber Systems Group in 2024. The organisational structure and the legal entities of the group remained unchanged.

In 2025, the company moved into a new building for the valve technology business unit at its site in Reichenau near Konstanz.

== Corporate structure ==
Weber-Hydraulik GmbH, based in Güglingen, is the parent company of the Weber Systems Group. The group includes the brands Weber-Hydraulik and Weber Rescue Systems. It is owned by the founding family, whose members are represented in the management as well as on the supervisory and advisory boards.

In the 2024 financial year, the group generated revenue of €297.6 million. The average number of employees was 1,407. The management consists of Christine Grotz and Yannick Weber.

The group owns subsidiaries, including production and service companies in Germany, Austria, and Poland.

=== Locations ===
- Weber-Hydraulik: Güglingen, Wörth an der Isar, Reichenau, Losenstein (Austria), Nowogrodziec (Poland)
- Weber Rescue Systems: Güglingen, Losenstein (Austria)
- Weber Rescue Shop GmbH: Güglingen
- Rescue Digital Systems GmbH: Güglingen, Bad Neuenahr-Ahrweiler
- Genesis Rescue Systems: Kettering (USA)

== Products ==
The company produces hydraulic systems, hydraulic cylinders, control blocks, valves, and power units. The range also includes a workshop programme as well as jacks, and was expanded in December 2025 to include electric drive systems and axial flux technologies.

Under the name Weber Rescue Systems, hydraulic rescue equipment such as cutting devices, spreaders, and rescue cylinders is produced. The range is complemented by stabilisation devices, lifting systems and specialised tools for glass management, such as glass cutters.

In addition, training courses, seminars and e-learning and training formats such as the so-called Rescuedays are offered, particularly for fire brigades and other emergency service organisations.
