= George Webster =

George Webster may refer to:

== Politicians ==
- George Webster (New Zealand politician) (died 1875), New Zealand politician
- George P. Webster (1828–1899), American lawyer and politician in New York
- George Harry Webster (1869–1933), mayor of Calgary, 1922–1926
- George T. Webster (born 1949), Canadian politician in the Legislative Assembly of Prince Edward Island

== Sportspeople ==
- George Webster (American football) (1945–2007), American football player

== Others ==
- George Webster (painter) (1797–1832), British maritime painter
- George Webster (architect) (1797–1864), British architect
- George Webster (medical practitioner) (died 1876), British doctor
- George D. Webster (USMC) (1919–1992), United States Marine Corps general
- George Amon Webster (1945–2013), baritone vocalist and pianist
- George Webster, wrote the original story for the 2005 film Valiant
- George Webster (actor) (born 1991), English actor and filmmaker
- George Webster (presenter), English television presenter, actor, dancer and writer
