= Webster, Putnam County, Ohio =

Coordinates: 40°58′16″N 83°53′24″W

Webster is a ghost town in Riley Township, Putnam County, Ohio, United States.

== History ==
Webster was not officially platted, but once contained a post office under the name Stanley. This post office was established in 1863, and remained in operation until 1891.
