= Neil Leslie Webster =

British Army officer

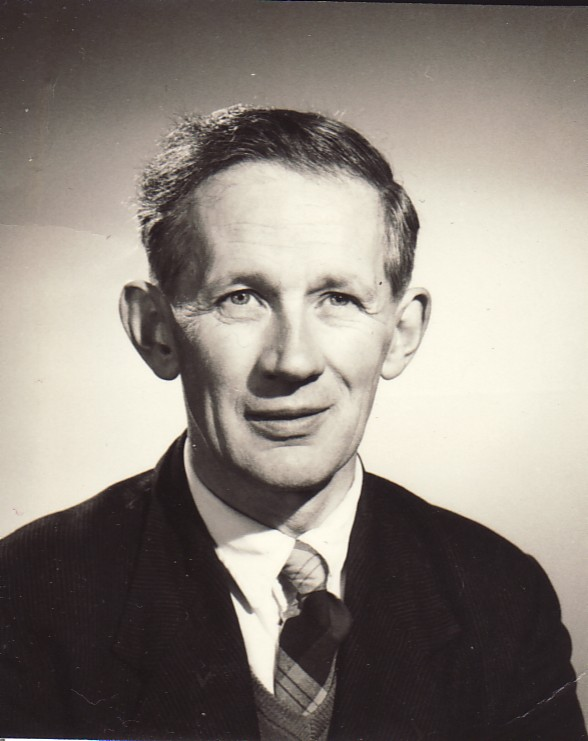
Neil Leslie Webster

Major Neil Leslie Webster (7 November 1906 – 1990) was a British Army officer, who worked in intelligence in World War II. He was a key figure in radio intelligence and cryptography who worked in the Fusion Room at Bletchley Park and was closely involved in the hunt for "cribs" for the Enigma machine. Before the war he worked as a literary agent and after it as a civil servant for the Central Office of Information.

== Early life ==
Neil Webster was born on 7 November 1906 in his grandparents' home, in Merionethshire, Wales. The Websters were a Scottish family, many of whom had served in the Indian Civil Service. His grandmother on his mother's side was Flora Annie Steel, née Webster, the well-known and influential Victorian novelist. She married Henry 'Hal' Steel and went with him straight to India, almost as a child bride. Over the years she had taken up women's rights there, started writing about India, and become famous – for her writings and her outspoken views. She was a big influence on Neil's life.

Neil's mother Mabel Steel married her first cousin John 'Jack' Webster who also worked all his life in the Indian Civil Service being awarded the Order of the Star of India. Neil was raised by his grandparents as his parents were in India. In 1920 he won a scholarship to Cheltenham College where he studied Latin, Greek, French and German. He also proved to be exceptionally quick at mathematics, having a natural aptitude for numbers, logic and abstract reasoning. He won a place at Corpus Christi College, Oxford, where he studied Logic with Greats before moving to Cambridge, to the (identically named) Corpus Christi College there, to do a post-graduate course in Industrial Psychology. He later went to North America where he spent some time travelling around and became involved in the literary scene in New York before returning to England to work as a literary agent.

== Wartime life and work ==
In 1939 Neil married Elizabeth (Betty) Heygate and, in the same year, joined the London Scottish Reserve. In 1940 he was recruited to MI8 in intelligence and worked on radio intelligence and code breaking until 1946. The work demanded a detached and logical approach (he was a chess-player), mathematical grasp, and an ability to 'think outside the box'.

When he was recruited by MI8 in April 1940 he joined the early members of the Central Party in Caxton Street. It was in Caxton St that the idea was born of ‘fusion’– integrating the knowledge from signals intelligence with decodes from cryptography. The Central Party moved to The Warren, Harpenden, and the unit he worked in was from then on known as the ‘Fusion Room’ – continuing in Beaumanor Hall and finally in Bletchley Park where, as a Major, he was liaison officer between signals intelligence and cryptographers, in what is now known as SIXTA. The Fusion Room in Bletchley Park was the central unit where decrypted German messages obtained from Hut 6 were compared with the corresponding data extracted by the log readers from the daily radio traffic between enemy stations, thus enabling a complete wartime picture of the enemy order of battle to be constructed.

The Fusion Room grew from a small beginning in 1940 until, by the end of the war at Bletchley Park in 1945, it numbered over two dozen men and women, including a few American army officers who had arrived in 1943. Webster’s role as liaison between traffic analysis and cryptography meant he was centrally involved in the search for ‘cribs’ – short pieces of enciphered text where the meaning is either known or can be guessed, which allow the whole cipher to be broken. These could open the door to decoding the whole message. The cribs were used to write menus for the 'bombes' (the early computers developed at Bletchley Park). He had a roving brief, to help Hut 6 people to break ciphers, especially the Enigma machine so that the information could reach Hut 3 intelligence. At the end of the war, Neil and his colleagues were responsible for writing the official history of SIXTA (at the time of writing, 2011, restricted and not accessible to the public).

== After the war ==
In 1947 he joined the Reference Division of the Central Office of Information where he responsible for the annual publication of The Britain Handbook. He retired in 1976 at the age of 70 and during his retirement began work on Cribs for Victory, his account of his wartime work in intelligence. It describes the intensive search for cribs for the Enigma machine in detail.

However, the permission to publish that he had first gained from Government Communications Headquarters (GCHQ) was withdrawn in 1985 on security grounds. Neil Webster died in Gloucestershire in 1990. After his death and that of his wife in 2007, Webster's daughter, Joss Pearson, sought and gained fresh clearance to publish her father's book, with additional material, in 2011.
