= Henry Webster =

Henry Webster may refer to:

- Henry Webster (cricketer) (1844–1915), English cricketer
- Henry Kitchell Webster (1875–1932), American author
- Henry S. Webster (1846–1910), American Civil War sailor and Medal of Honor recipient
- Henry Vassall Webster (1793–1847), British Army officer
- Harry Webster (Henry George Webster, 1917–2007), British automotive engineer
- Harry Webster (footballer, born 1930) (1930–2008), English footballer
- Harry Webster (footballer, born 2006), English footballer
