= Jean Webster (cook) =

American cook and charity worker (1935–2011)

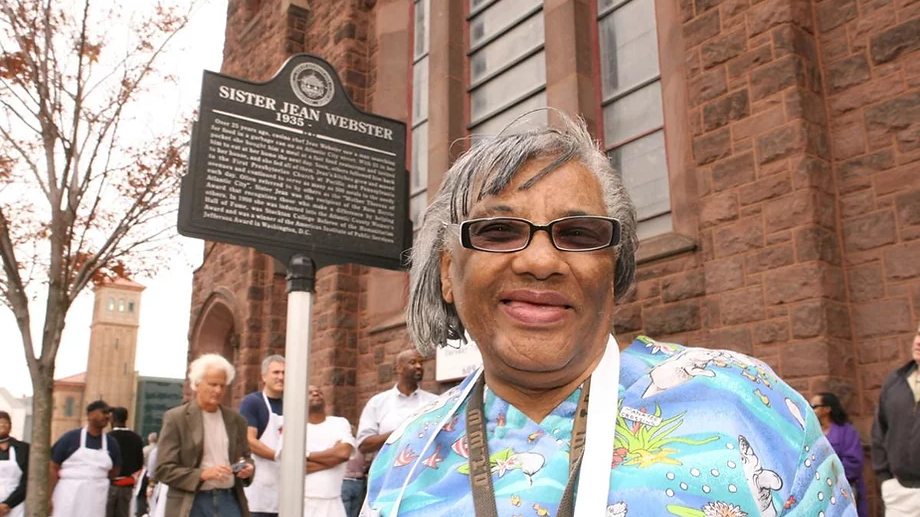
- Webster in 2007, posing in front of a commemorative plaque erected in Atlantic City outside Sister Jean's Kitchen
- Born: January 7, 1935; New York City, US
- Died: January 10, 2011 (aged 76); Atlantic City, New Jersey, US
- Known for: Providing hundreds of free meals daily at Sister Jean's Kitchen in Atlantic City

Jean Webster (January 7, 1935 – January 10, 2011) was an American cook who operated Sister Jean's Kitchen, a soup kitchen in Atlantic City, New Jersey. Webster began serving free meals to the poor of the city out of her own home in 1986, cooked in her personal kitchen. Eventually her informal charity expanded into a substantial operation that moved to Victory First Presbyterian Deliverance Church. Food was available to any and all who came. At its height, Sister Jean's Kitchen served over 400 people per day with hot meals.

== Life and career ==
Jean Webster was born in New York City in 1935. She moved to Atlantic City, New Jersey, at age 4 or 5 after her father switched jobs. She attended culinary school after graduating from the school system. Even before completion of school, she was working on the side to help her family's finances. From a young age, she worked as a cook at nursing homes to help support her five sisters and three brothers. She had a job at the kitchen of the Marlborough-Blenheim Hotel as a dish-washer at the age of 18; she learned to cook from a chef there.

Webster worked in casinos later in her life, which became Atlantic City's main source of employment after they were legalized in the 1970s and expanded in the 1980s. She was one of the first black female sous-chefs employed at Atlantic City casinos. Her employers included the Playboy Hotel and Casino, Caesars Atlantic City, Atlantis Hotel and Casino, and the Trump Taj Mahal. Webster retired from the Taj Mahal in 1991 due to health issues related to a heart condition that resulted in angina and other complications.

== Sister Jean's Kitchen ==
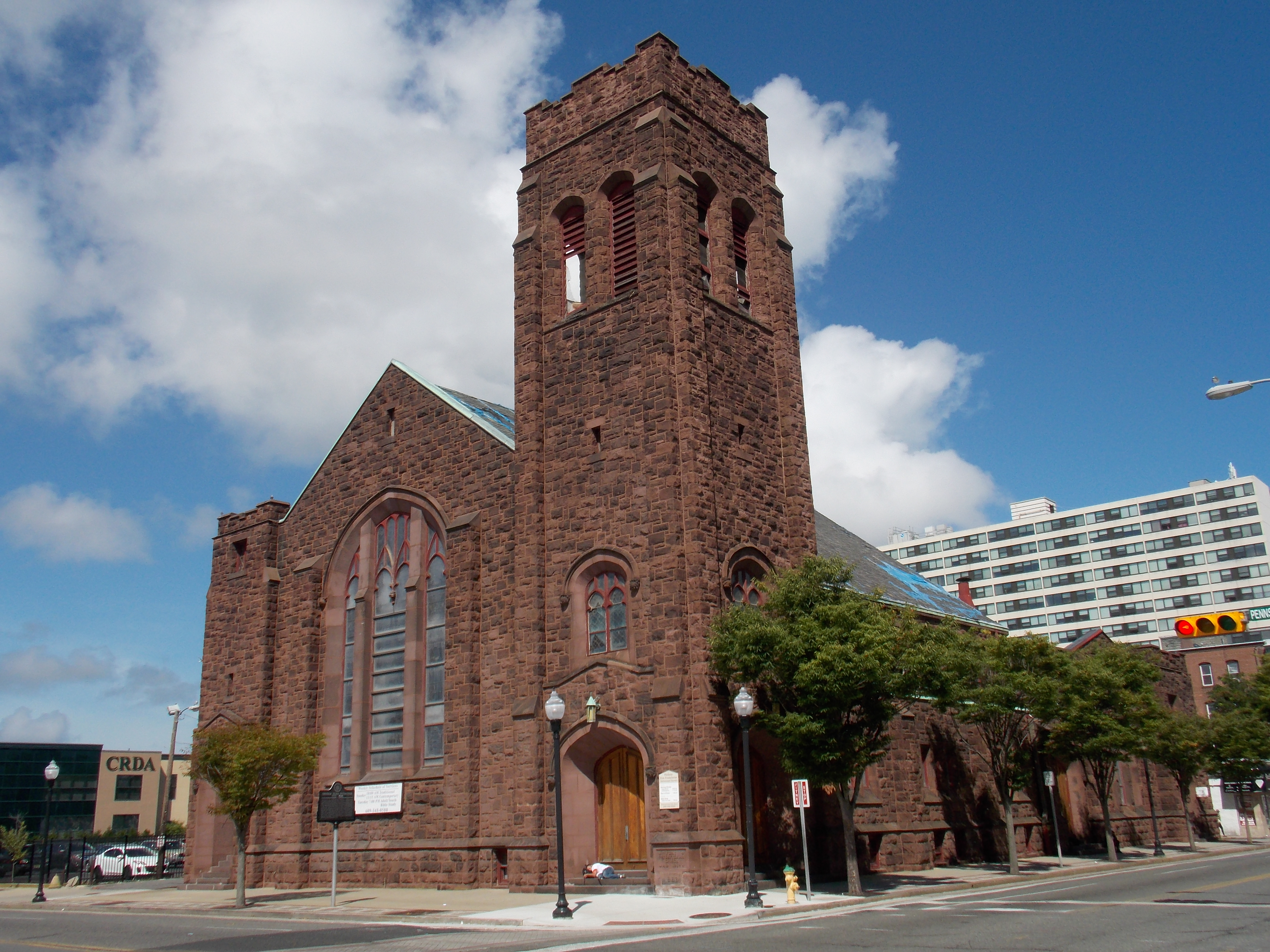
Victory First Presbyterian Deliverance Church in 2014. Sister Jean's Kitchen operated from Victory First from September 1997 – February 2019.

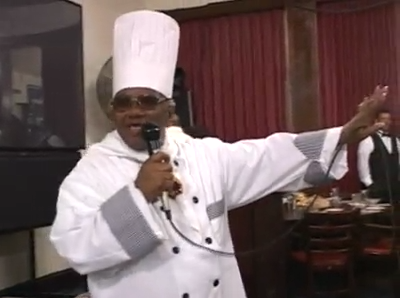
Webster in 2003

Webster attributed her inspiration to feed people from an experience meeting a homeless man in 1986. She bought a meal for him at a nearby pizza restaurant, and invited him to her home for dinner the next day. She said that she felt called by God to start a mission of feeding people, and made it known that she would feed anyone who stopped by. Lines formed outside her home once word spread through the Atlantic City community. During the early phases of her operation, she fed around 100 regular attendees two meals a day, and spent nearly all of her free time cooking, while she held down a regular job at the Taj Mahal. Her charity eventually drew attention outside her own church. While she had initially used her own funds to pay for food, the popularity of her food distribution rendered this unsustainable. She obtained funding from local churches, the Taj Mahal, as well as other casinos to continue her work. She also began being referred to as "Sister Jean" during her charity work. (Note: Her title of "Sister" was in the Protestant black church sense, not the Catholic sense, as she was not a nun.) Her work drew wide attention, and she was also called the "Mother Teresa of Jersey".

Jean Webster's Kitchen made no restrictions, including no limitations on repeat visits, which made it attractive to the most desperate parts of society such as the homeless. For Thanksgiving in 1992, she cooked for over 300 people. Webster cooked for up to 200 people a day there by 1994, until it became impossible to continue from her home's kitchen, which was not intended for such volume. After a fire and news that her landlord was facing foreclosure on the property in 1995, she decided to move locations. In September 1997, the soup kitchen moved to Victory First Presbyterian Deliverance Church, (Note: Victory First is a combination of Victory Deliverance Temple, the congregation to which Webster personally belonged, and First Presbyterian Church; the two shared the same building and eventually merged.) on Pennsylvania Avenue between Pacific and Atlantic Avenues. Webster's old employer, the nearby Taj Mahal, furnished much of the kitchen equipment. At Victory First Presbyterian, the kitchen was able to service many more people than Webster's personal home. She continued cooking there with the aid of rotating volunteers; serving over 400 people a day. The kitchen also received donations of leftover food from the local casinos. On holidays, attendance would surge; in 2001, the kitchen served over 1,600 people on Thanksgiving.

Webster disliked the term "soup kitchen" for having a quick-and-dirty connotation, and her kitchen served more than soup. She preferred to emphasize the community and spirituality aspect, describing the operation as a "house of happiness" or "mission", as well as referring to attendees as "guests". Her operation attracted some criticism, as Victory First was close to Atlantic City's tourism district and there were worries that the line-ups of homeless people eager for food would not present the city well to outsiders. She defended doing her work in Atlantic City's downtown, noting that she insisted on professional behavior from guests in line.

Health issues and age impaired Webster's ability to continue working in the late 2000s. Economic issues, such as the declining profitability of Atlantic City casinos and the recession of 2007–2009, put pressure on the funding of the kitchen, and Sister Jean's Kitchen had to lay off staff in late 2008. Jean Webster died on January 10, 2011, at the age of 76 due to illness related to her heart and lungs. She was survived by her daughter Cecelia Woodard, a grandchild, and two great-grandchildren.

== Legacy ==
After Webster became unable to continue working due to health issues late in her life, Sister Jean's Kitchen continued to operate under others. Webster authorized a nonprofit foundation, the Friends of Jean Webster, to take over running the kitchen as her health declined. The organization continued operating Sister Jean's Kitchen after her death. Its executive director is John Scotland, who served as the minister of the nearby Brigantine Community Church from 1991–2021.

The move of Sister Jean's Kitchen to Victory First Presbyterian Deliverance Church had been done in haste due to Webster having to leave her original rented home, and was originally a temporary arrangement. Webster planned to move to a new location as early as 2005, but plans fell through. Victory First was damaged by Hurricane Sandy in 2012. As a result, the urgency in searching for options to move out increased. In 2017, the organization purchased space at St. Monica's, a former Catholic church on Pennsylvania Avenue a few blocks away from Victory First. The Friends of Jean Webster planned to renovate St. Monica's kitchen and use it as the new home of the soup kitchen with support from the Casino Reinvestment Development Authority (CRDA), a public agency that uses taxes from the casinos for projects to improve Atlantic City. However, these plans largely fell through. The St. Monica's building was deemed unsafe in its current condition, and fixing this would require a larger grant than the CRDA was willing to provide after estimates of the cost of the renovation climbed to 2 million dollars. The CRDA eventually reimbursed the Kitchen for $300,000 of the money they had already spent on the attempt to redevelop the property.

City inspectors considered Victory First still too damaged to continue to host the soup kitchen. Sister Jean's Kitchen shut down in February 2019 after continuing concerns about safety and fitness for purpose of Victory First. Other programs for the indigent in Atlantic City saw increased volume after the closure, putting pressure on their finances.

In November 2020, Sister Jean's Pantry was opened by the Friends of Jean Webster. Rather than the soup kitchen of before that served hot meals daily, something made infeasible both by budget and by the coronavirus pandemic impacting in-person dining, the Pantry is instead an emergency source of non-perishable food boxes. It operates out of St. Monica's, which while not fully renovated for kitchen use, was approved for the simpler pantry distribution purpose. While the renovations of the building remain stalled, the Friends of Jean Webster organization eventually brought back the full soup kitchen with hot meals in the summer of 2024.
