= Nicholson Institute, Leek =

Historic building in Staffordshire, England

Nicholson Institute
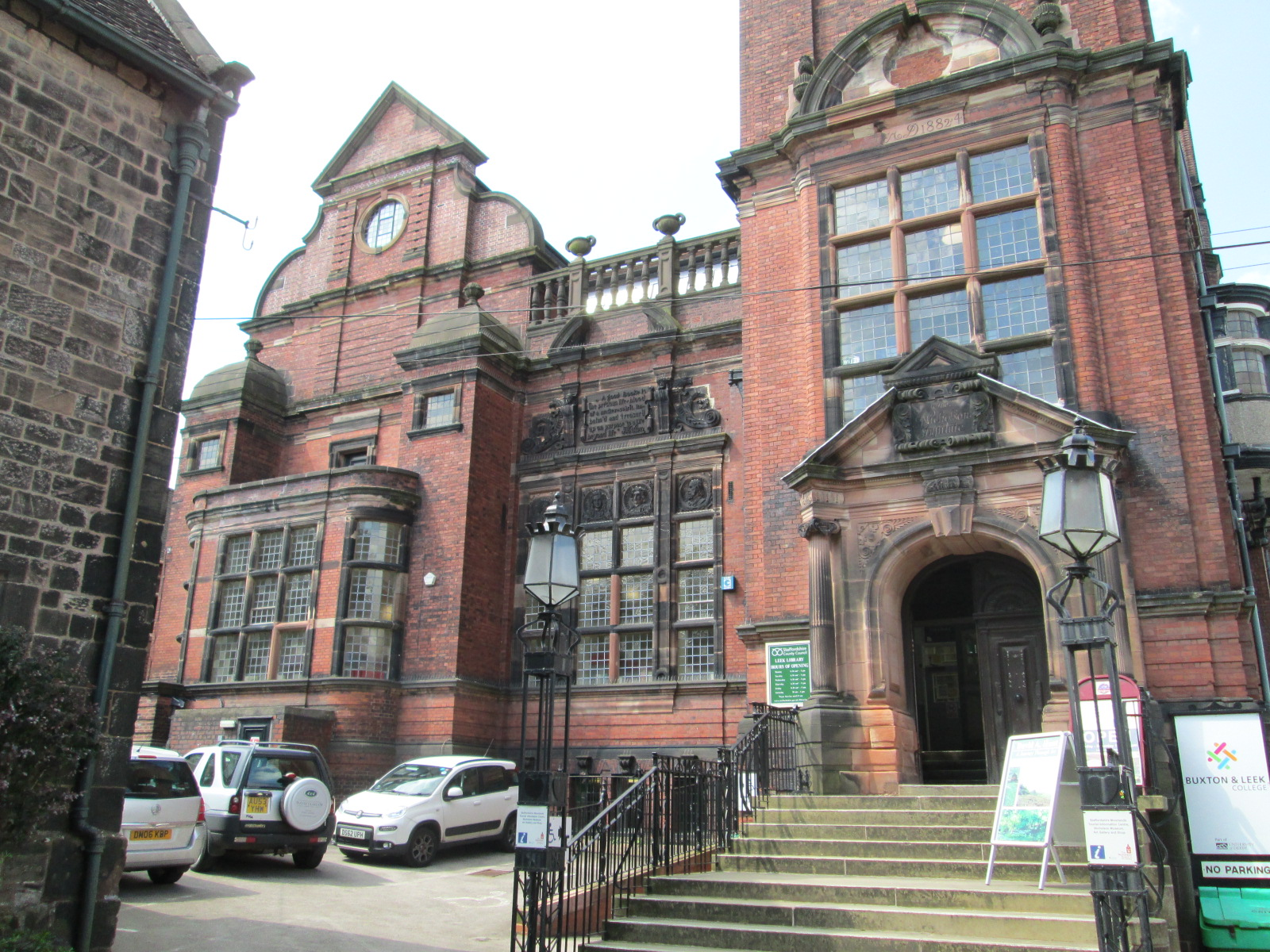
- The building in 2017

- Location within Staffordshire

General information
- Architectural style: Queen Anne
- Location: Stockwell Street, Leek, Staffordshire, England
- Coordinates: 53°6′26.280″N 2°1′25.248″W grid reference SJ 98512 56678
- Completed: 1884

Design and construction
- Architect: William Larner Sugden

Listed Building – Grade II*
- Official name: Nicholson Institute and Leek College of Further Education
- Designated: 7 June 1972
- Reference no.: 1268544

The Nicholson Institute, housing the Nicholson Museum and Art Gallery, is a historic building on Stockwell Street in Leek, Staffordshire, England. It was built in 1884 to contain a museum, art gallery and public library, and still does so today. It is a Grade II* listed building.

== History and description ==
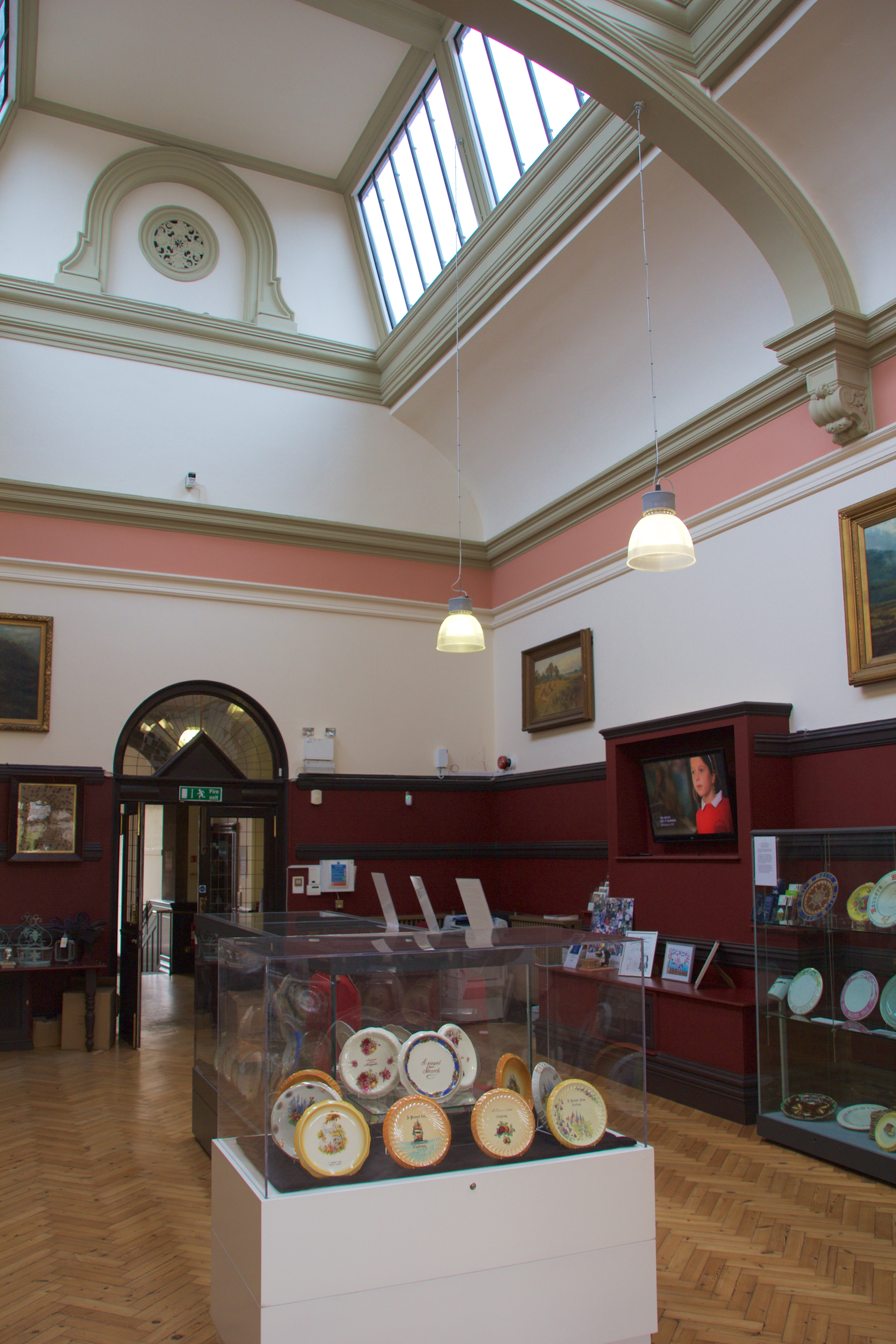
The interior in 2015

The building was designed in the Queen Anne style by William Larner Sugden of W. Sugden and Son, a firm responsible for many buildings in Leek in the second half of the 19th century. It was presented to the town by Joshua Nicholson (died 1885), a local silk manufacturer, as a monument to the politician and businessman Richard Cobden, and it opened in 1884.

The building is of brick with stone dressings, and its frontage has mullioned and transomed windows with a Dutch gable to the left; above the advanced entrance on the right is a tower with a copper-domed roof and a roof lantern. Part of the frontage is obscured behind Greystones, a Grade II*-listed late 17th-century building that bears a plaque stating "William Morris and Leek founder members of The Society for the Protection of Ancient Buildings saved this building in 1884".

The Nicholson Institute initially contained a museum, picture gallery, three rooms for the Leek School of Art, and a free library of about 6,000 volumes selected by J. O. Nicholson, eldest son of Joshua Nicholson.

=== The school of art ===
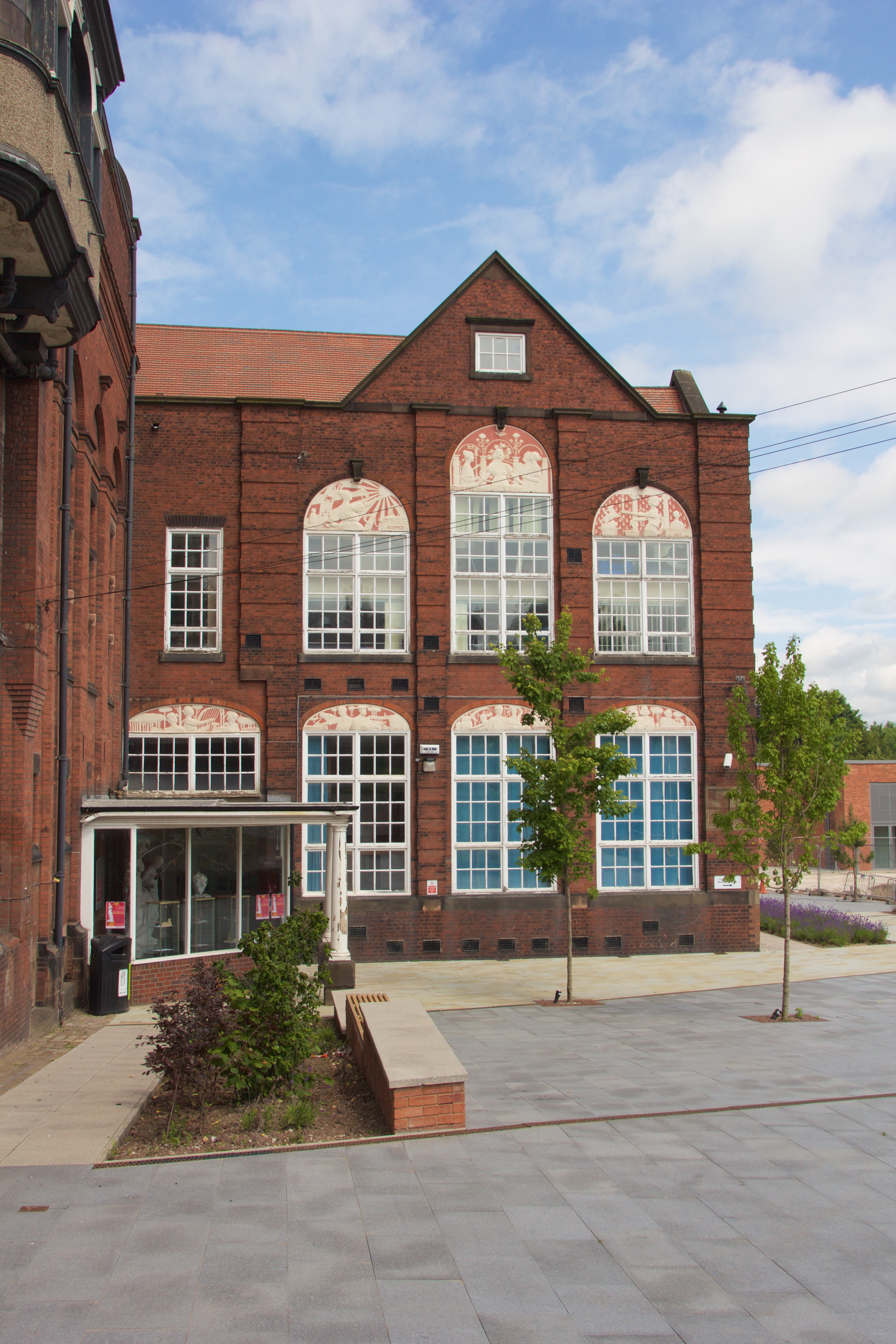
The 1900 extension

After the establishment of the government's Science and Art Department, the mechanics' institute in Leek set up a school of art in 1868, initially housed from 1879 in a hired room in Stockwell Street. Joshua Nicholson was persuaded to incorporate more suitable accommodation for the school in his projected building.

An extension was added in 1900, partly to provide space for a silk school promoted by several local silk mill owners, who were aware of the similar institution in Macclesfield.

The Leek College of Further Education and School of Art was formed in 1981, by which time the college occupied additional buildings in the town. The interior of the 1900 extension was remodelled in 1994. In 2012, it merged with the University of Derby to become part of Buxton and Leek College, and in August 2025 ownership of the Leek campus transferred to Newcastle and Stafford Colleges Group (NSCG).

== Present day ==
The museum collects and displays material relating to the history of the Staffordshire Moorlands, including paintings, textiles, ceramics and items connected with local life.

The art gallery hosts an annual programme of temporary exhibitions covering a broad range of themes.

The building closed in September 2025 for a £3.8 million improvement programme to renovate the library and museum and to restore the lower ground floor for public use after many years. The library was moved temporarily to a neighbouring council building, and the site is due to reopen in late summer 2026.
