= Blackheath Halls =

Concert hall in Blackheath, London, England

- Blackheath Concert Hall
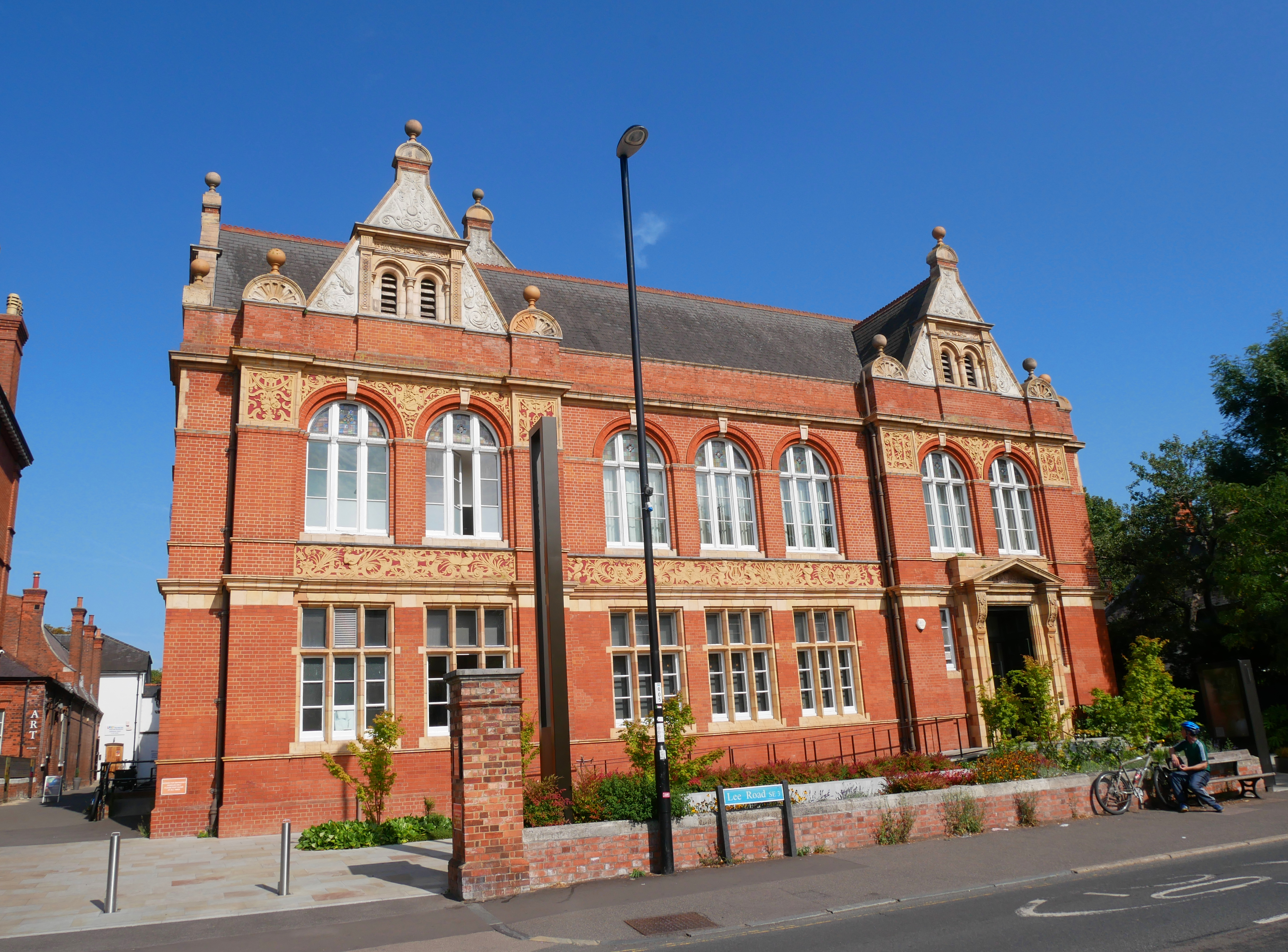
- Blackheath Halls
- Interactive map of Blackheath Halls
- Location: Blackheath; London, SE3; United Kingdom
- Coordinates: 51°27′52″N 0°0′34.7″E
- Owner: Trinity Laban Conservatoire of Music & Dance
- Capacity: 600 (Great Hall); 160 (Recital)
- Type: Music and Comedy
- Public transit: Blackheath

Construction
- Opened: 1895; 131 years ago
- Rebuilt: 1991

Website
- www.trinitylaban.ac.uk/about-us/visit-us/#blackheath-halls

Blackheath Halls is a 600-seat concert hall on Lee Road in Blackheath, London, United Kingdom. It claims to be London's oldest surviving purpose-built cultural venue.

== History ==
It was established via a public subscription and built in 1895. Some sources suggest it was constructed by the firm of William Webster, though this may reflect his son William's involvement in funding the project, as other sources attribute the construction to a J.O. Richardson of Peckham.

The venue initially hosted orchestral and choral works and some of the 20th century's most famous musical performers appeared there, such as Dame Clara Butt and Percy Grainger.

=== Restoration ===
During the 1980s the Halls were saved from demolition via the support of local businesses and the community. Extensive renovation and restoration followed and the Halls fully reopened in 1991. Blackheath Halls are now a wholly owned subsidiary of Trinity Laban Conservatoire of Music and Dance.

== Venue ==
Featuring a 600-seat Great Hall and 160-seat recital room the Halls cater for classical concerts, music gigs (rock, pop and folk) as well as stand-up comedy acts. A major feature of the Halls revolves around encouraging the local community to get involved with family performances and activities.

== See also ==
- List of concert halls
