= James Webster =

James Webster may refer to:

- James Webster (Australian politician) (1925–2022), Senator in Australia
- James Webster (rugby league) (born 1979), rugby league player for Widnes Vikings
- James Webster (musicologist), musicologist on the faculty of Cornell University
- James Webster (American football) (born 1950), head college football coach for the Tennessee State University Tigers
- James Webster, officer who served under Cornwallis in the American War of Independence in Battle of Camden
- James Webster (wrestler), freestyle featherweight wrestler who participated at the 1908 Summer Olympics
- James Webster (Canada West politician) (1808–1869), MLA for Canada West and co-founder of Fergus, Ontario
- James G. Webster (born 1951), professor and audience researcher
- J. J. Webster (James Jefferson Webster, 1898–1965), American politician, farmer, and businessman
- Jeff Webster (checkers player) (James Jefferson Webster III, born 1966), American checkers player
- James Lockhart Webster (1885–1948), Canadian politician
- James Webster (priest) (1734–1804), Archdeacon of Gloucester
- Sir James Webster-Wedderburn (1788–1840), British army officer and dandy

== See also ==
- James L Webster Elementary School
- James Jefferson Webster Highway
