= Webster Township =

Webster Township may refer to:

== Indiana ==
- Webster Township, Harrison County, Indiana
- Webster Township, Wayne County, Indiana

== Iowa ==
- Webster Township, Hamilton County, Iowa
- Webster Township, Madison County, Iowa, in Madison County, Iowa
- Webster Township, Polk County, Iowa
- Webster Township, Webster County, Iowa

== Kansas ==
- Webster Township, Smith County, Kansas, in Smith County, Kansas
- Webster Township, Wilson County, Kansas

== Michigan ==
- Webster Township, Michigan

== Minnesota ==
- Webster Township, Rice County, Minnesota

== Nebraska ==
- Webster Township, Dodge County, Nebraska

== North Carolina ==
- Webster Township, Jackson County, North Carolina, in Jackson County, North Carolina

== North Dakota ==
- Webster Township, Ramsey County, North Dakota, in Ramsey County, North Dakota

== Ohio ==
- Webster Township, Wood County, Ohio

== Oklahoma ==
- Webster Township, Woodward County, Oklahoma

== South Dakota ==
- Webster Township, Day County, South Dakota, in Day County, South Dakota

== See also ==
- Webster (disambiguation)
