= John Webster (organist) =

Britisg organist

- Born: 1914; Yorkshire, England
- Died: 6 January 1974 (aged 59–60)
- Genres: Classical music
- Occupation: Musician
- Instrument: Organ
- Label: Decca

John Webster (1914–1974) was a British classical organist.

Webster was born in Yorkshire, England. In 1936, he became the Organ Scholar at University College, Oxford. Later he was appointed as the organist of the college, a position that he retained until his death in 1974. During 1938–1965, he was also the University Organist at the University Church of St Mary the Virgin, the Oxford University church in Oxford. In addition, he became Professor of the Organ at Trinity College of Music in London.

Webster played the organ at the wedding of the later British Prime Minister Harold Wilson and Mary Wilson, held at Mansfield College, Oxford on 1 January 1940. He taught Gerard Brooks, later the President of the Royal College of Organists. Webster's recordings include Organ Music From University College, Oxford (Decca, 1973).

Papers on Webster are held in the archive at University College, Oxford.
