= Dan Webster (baseball) =

American baseball player

- Pitcher
- Born: March 26, 1912; Montgomery, Alabama, U.S.
- Died: June 5, 1988 (aged 76); Detroit, Michigan, U.S.
- Threw: Right

Negro league baseball debut
- 1936, for the Kansas City Monarchs

Last appearance
- 1937, for the Detroit Stars

Teams
- Kansas City Monarchs (1936); Detroit Stars (1937)

Daniel Webster (March 26, 1912 – June 5, 1988) was an American Negro league pitcher in the 1930s.

A native of Montgomery, Alabama, Webster played for the Kansas City Monarchs in 1936, and for the Detroit Stars the following season. In eight recorded career games on the mound, he posted a 5.48 ERA over 44.1 innings. Webster died in Detroit, Michigan in 1988 at age 76.
