= Frank Webster =

Frank Webster may refer to:

- Frank Webster (sociologist) (born 1950), British sociologist
- Frank Webster (politician), Australian politician
- Frank Blake Webster (1850–1922), ornithological publisher, taxidermist and natural history dealer
- Frank Daniel Webster (1866–1932), US Army General in World War I
- Frank V. Webster, a pseudonym controlled by the Stratemeyer Syndicate, the first book packager of books aimed at children
- Frank Webster, fictional character in the 1954 film, The Fast and the Furious
