= Mary Clark Webster =

American politician

Mary Clark Webster is an American politician from Maine. A Republican, Webster served in the Maine House of Representatives. In 1989–90, she was the House Minority Leader. The 126th legislature passed a joint resolution honoring Webster and other prominent female political figures in the state.
