= David Webster (cricketer) =

English cricketer

David Webster (born 22 May 1946) was an English cricketer. He was a left-handed batsman and a right-arm medium-pace bowler. He was born in Sheffield, West Riding of Yorkshire.

Webster had represented Derbyshire in the Second XI Championship since 1970, and also appeared in the competition in 1972 and 1974. His only first-class appearance came in a university match against Oxford University in 1975. Steady in the middle-order, he was economical enough with the ball to see the Peakites to a victory in Burton upon Trent.

Webster did not play competitive cricket after the 1975 season.
