= Webber =

Webber may refer to:

- Webber Lake, California, a lake in Sierra County, California
- Webber, Kansas, a US city
- Webber Township, Jefferson County, Illinois, USA
- Webber Township, Michigan, USA
- Webber International University, in Babson Park, Florida, USA
- Webber (surname), people with the surname Webber

== See also ==
- Weber (disambiguation)
