= Jack Webster (police officer) =

Canadian police officer (1923–2002)

Jack Webster (August 1923 – June 27, 2002), nicknamed Copper Jack, was a leading police officer, administrator and police historian in Toronto, Ontario, Canada.

Webster was born in Toronto to an immigrant family from Scotland. At age sixteen, he lied about his age to join the Royal Canadian Engineers; he later said that he was afraid World War II would already be over if he waited until the legal age of eighteen. Webster was in the army for five years, and served in France, Belgium and the Netherlands.

He joined the Toronto police force on the same day he was discharged from the army in 1945, and was assigned to a street patrol on Queen Street West. He once identified a person he had seen on his beat as escaped German prisoner of war Wolfgang Friedlander, which nearly led to Friedlander's capture in Quebec (Friedlander later turned himself in, fearing his identity would be discovered). Webster was the last constable to ride a bicycle on his beat, and was the last Toronto policeman to wear a bobby's helmet and tight-necked tunic on duty. In 1958, he was appointed to the city's newly formed Robbery Squad.

Webster later became commander of Toronto's homicide squad, and is credited with solving 85 murders. One of the murderers he helped capture was Detroit gangster Arthur Lucas, who was one of the last two criminals executed in Canada before abolition of capital punishment. Webster recounted that before his execution, Lucas calmly thanked Webster and his partner for handling the case in a fair manner. Webster said in a 1987 interview that he supported capital punishment, but did not believe it would be re-established in Canada.

Webster became chief of detectives, and was eventually chosen to lead the force in Scarborough. In 1976, he became leader of the force in Etobicoke with the rank of Staff Superintendent. He once declined an offer to become deputy police chief of Metro Toronto. Had he accepted the offer, he could have become the city's Chief of Police.

He retired from the force in 1988, but returned to work as an official historian at the Toronto Police Museum. In 1991, he published an autobiography entitled Copper Jack: My Life on the Force, co-written with mystery writer Rosemary Aubert. He moved to Winnipeg in 2000 to spend more time with his family. His daughter, Rosemary Vodrey, was a senior cabinet minister in the Manitoba provincial government of Gary Filmon during the 1990s.

Webster died in 2002, at age 78. Veteran Toronto Star crime reporter Gwyn "Jocko" Thomas spoke at his funeral, and described him as a "superb police officer".
