= William Webster (builder) =

English builder (1819–1888)

- Born: May 1819; Wyberton, England
- Died: 1 February 1888 (aged 68); London, England
- Known for: Crossness Pumping Station (1865); Albert Embankment (1869); Victoria Embankment (1870); Chelsea Embankment (1874)

William Webster (May 1819 – 1 February 1888) was a British builder who worked with architects and engineers such as Gilbert Scott and Joseph Bazalgette and is especially associated with several embankments of the River Thames.

== Career ==
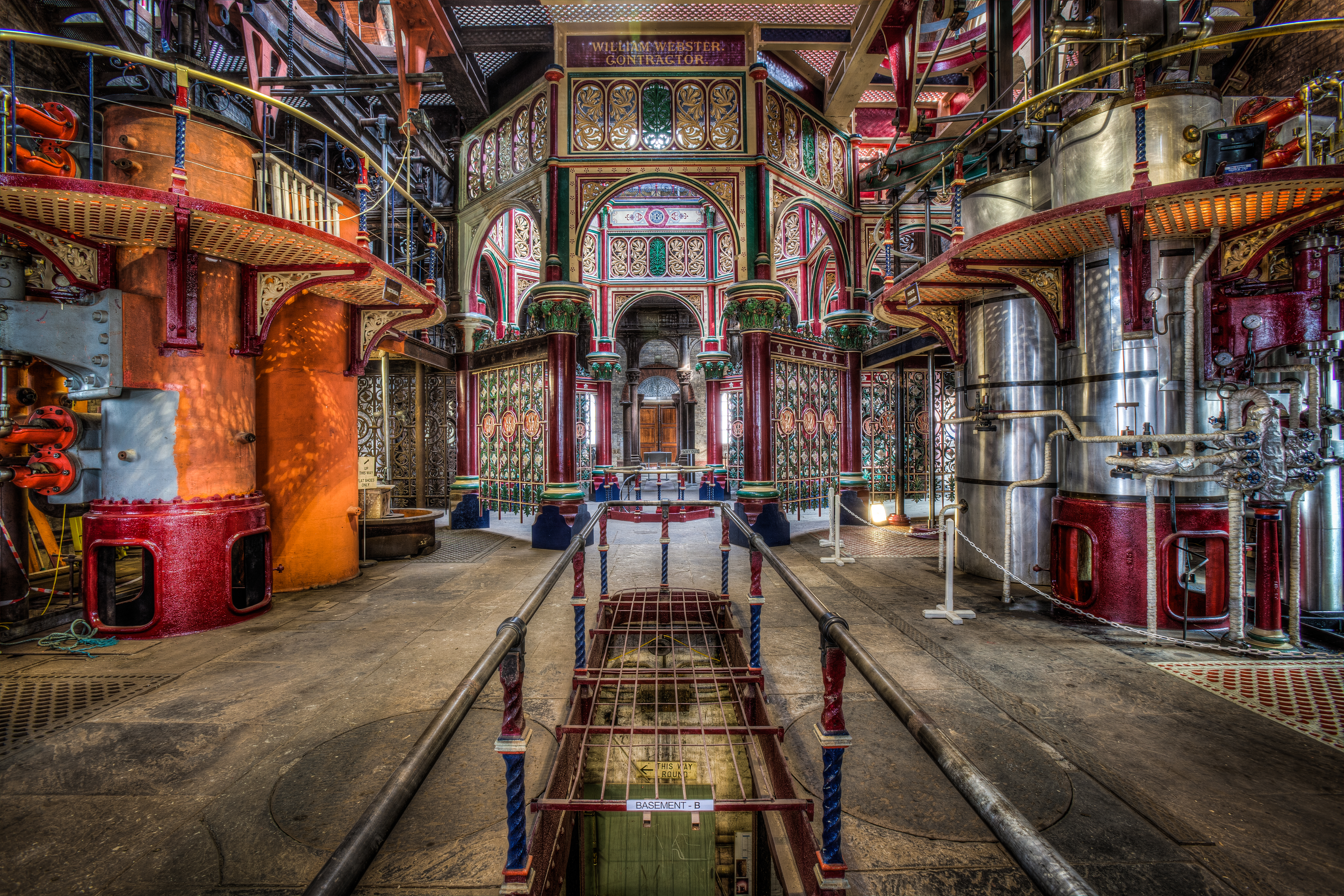
Interior of Crossness Pumping Station. Webster's name appears on the ironwork (top-center)

Born in the small Lincolnshire village of Wyberton in 1819, Webster apprenticed to the Boston, Lincolnshire builder Mr. Jackson. Immediately following his apprenticeship, Webster became a builder in Wyberton and was initially involved in the refurbishment and renovation of a number of churches in Lincolnshire (working with Sir Gilbert Scott on Algakirk church) and the surrounding counties as well the building of Boston's Exchange Building.

Between 1856 and 1857, Webster was commissioned to build the Cambridge Lunatic Asylum at Fulbourn. Following the completion of this project his next was the building of the Three Counties Asylum, near Hitchin.

Moving to London in 1860, his first projects in the capital included contracts for the Crossness Southern Outfall Sewer, Abbey Mills Pumping Station and the Western Pumping Station (adjacent to the Grosvenor Canal in Pimlico). He then moved to constructing parts of the Victoria Embankment and the whole of the Albert and Chelsea Embankments (1871) as well as an extension to the embankment around the Houses of Parliament. He was also involved in the Holborn Viaduct railway station and hotel, and the southern approaches to Tower Bridge. His company also undertook many other contracts including building chapels - for example, the Dissenters' Chapel in Hither Green Cemetery.

Webster died at his residence, Wyberton House (built, probably to his own design, by his firm and completed in 1869), in Lee, London on 1 February 1888, and was interred at St Margaret's, Lee.

== Legacy ==
After Webster's death, his firm was continued for some years by his son, also called William, a chemical engineer. Some sources suggest the company's work included construction of Blackheath Halls though this may reflect his son's involvement in funding the project, as other sources attribute the construction to a J.O. Richardson of Peckham.

== Gallery ==
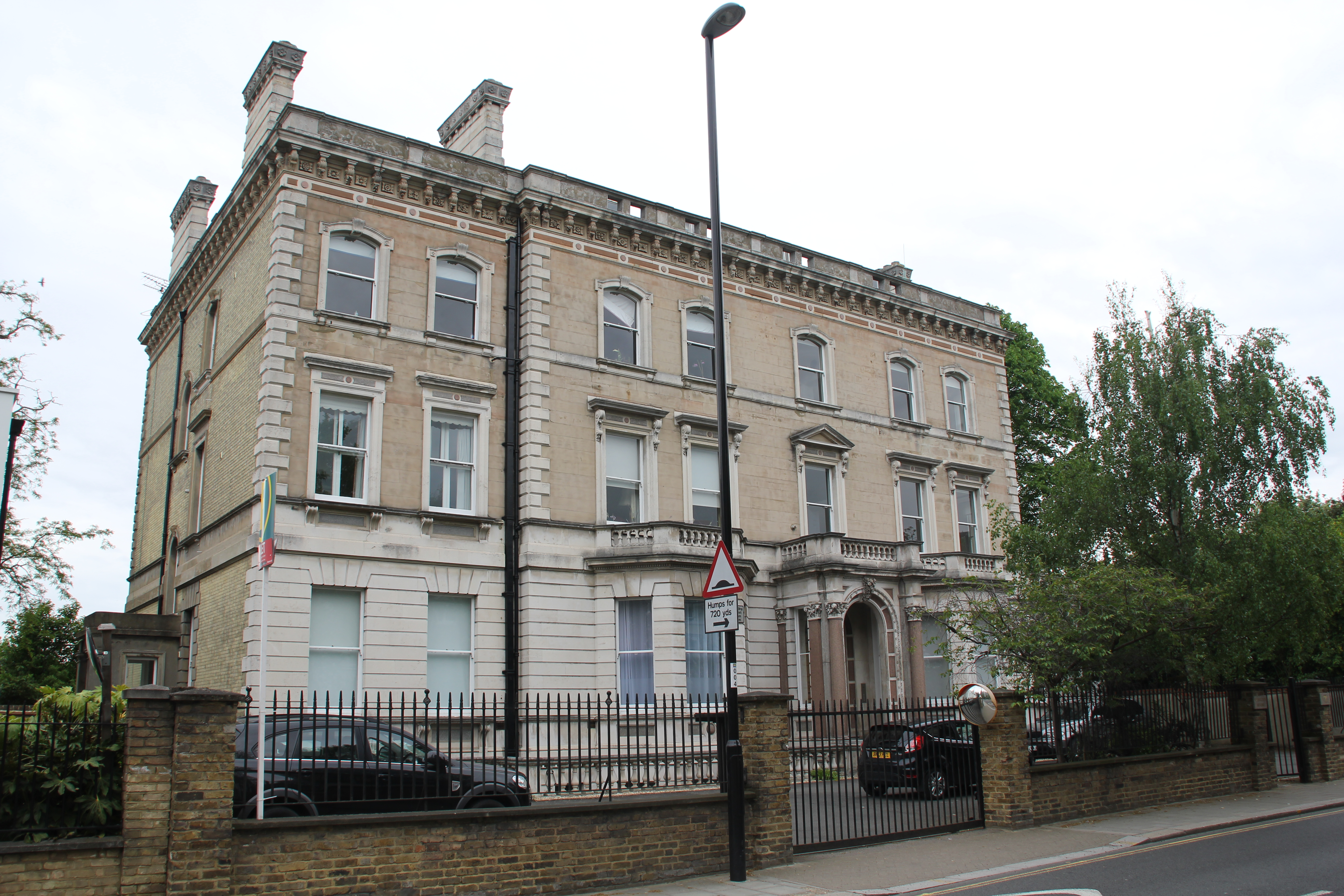
Wyberton House

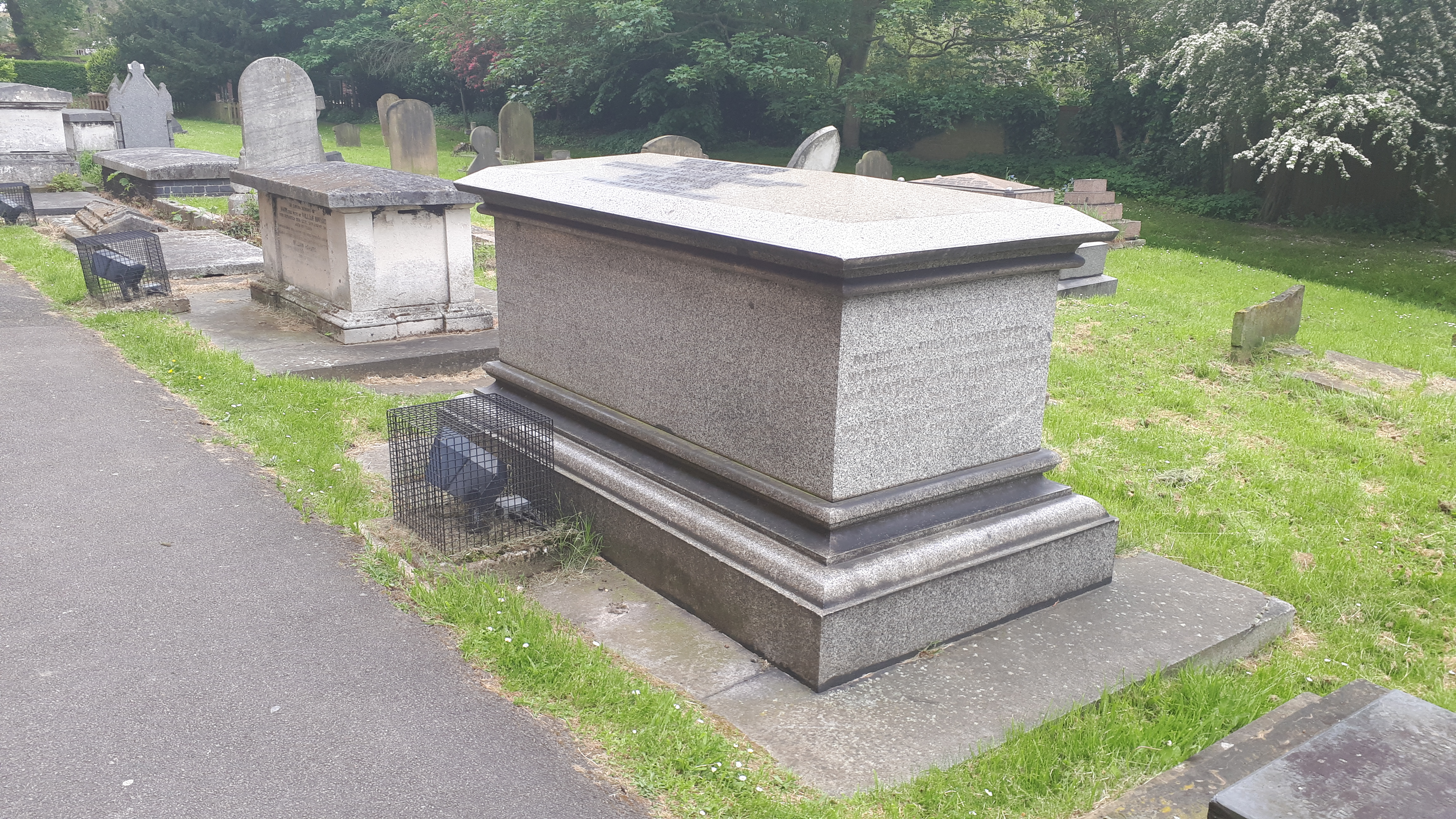
Webster's grave

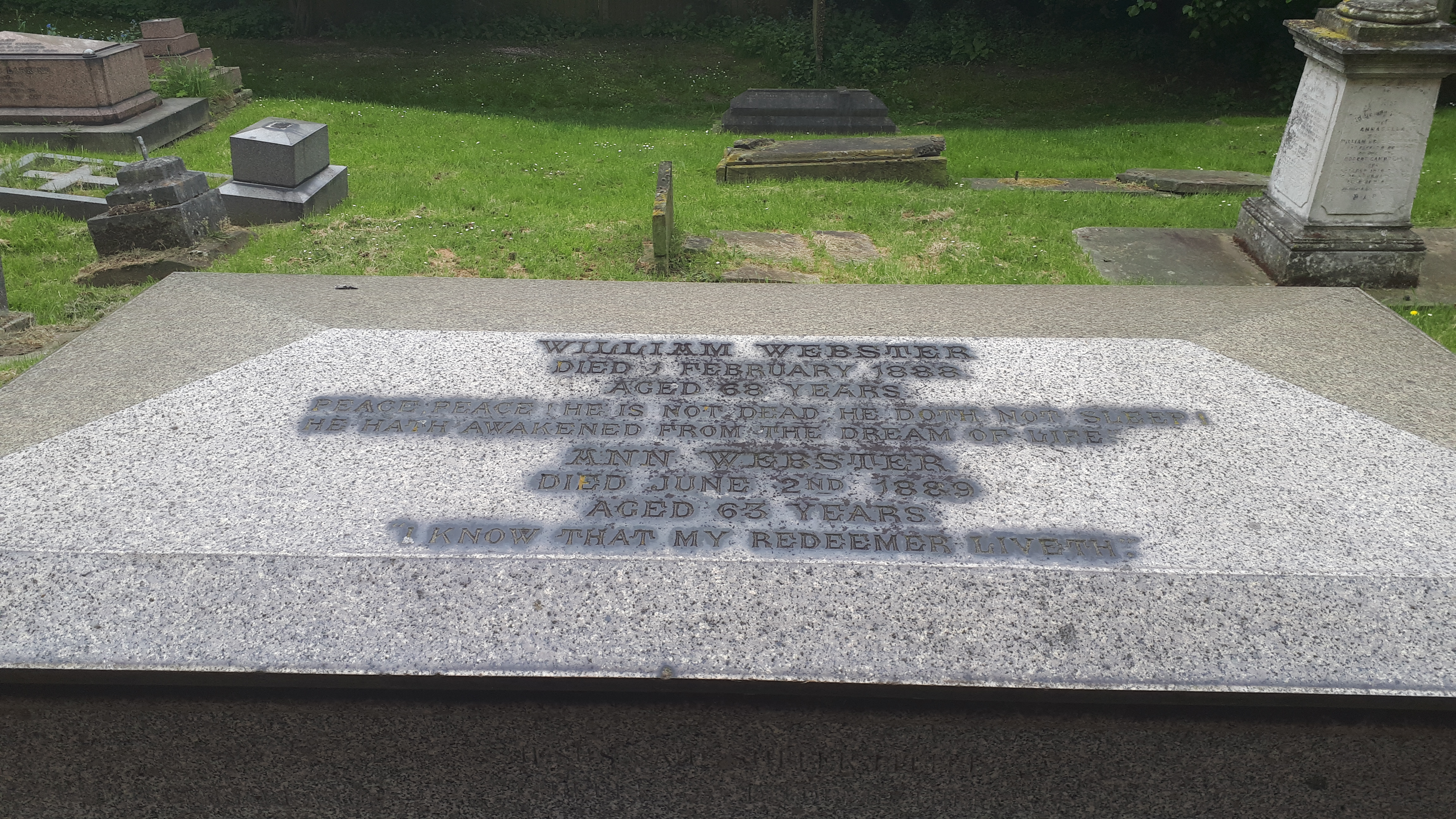
Grave inscription

== Notable works ==
- Crossness Pumping Station (1865)
- Albert Embankment (1869)
- Victoria Embankment (1870)
- Chelsea Embankment (1874)
- Blackheath Halls

== See also ==
- Thames Embankment
