= Jack Webster (cricketer) =

English cricketer

Jack Webster (1917–1997) was an English cricketer active from 1938 to 1956 who played for Cambridge University immediately before the Second World War. He joined Northamptonshire after the war and played occasionally for them from 1946 to 1955. He appeared in 71 first-class matches as a right arm medium fast bowler who was a righthanded batsman. Webster was born in Tyersal, Bradford on 28 October 1917 and died in Guiting Power, Gloucestershire, on 25 October 1997, aged 79. He took 145 first-class wickets with a best performance of seven for 78 and he scored 617 runs with a highest score of 65, one of two half-centuries.

== Sources ==
- Jack Webster at CricketArchive (subscription required)
- Jack Webster at Cricinfo
- Playfair Cricket Annual – 1948 edition
