= Webster Pass (Colorado) =

Mountain pass in Colorado, USA

- Location within Colorado
- Elevation: 12,104 ft (3,689 m)
- Traversed by: trail

Third Approach
- Location: Park / Summit counties, Colorado, U.S.
- Range: Front Range
- Coordinates: 39°31′52″N 105°49′58″W
- Topo map: USGS Montezuma

Webster Pass, elevation 12,104 ft (3,689 m), is a mountain pass that crosses the Continental Divide in the Front Range of the Rocky Mountains of Colorado in the United States. Originally known as Handcart Pass, the name was changed in 1878 after the Webster brothers of the Montezuma Silver Mining Company converted the pass into a toll road. The name Handcart refers to the small handcarts which miners would use to haul their outfits over the pass. The pass was abandoned when miners could not find gold in paying quantities.

== See also ==
- Colorado mountain passes
