= William Webster (chemical engineer) =

English chemical engineer

- Born: 1855; London, England
- Died: 1910 (aged 54–55); London, England
- Occupation: Chemical engineer

William Webster (1855–1910) was an English chemical engineer credited with developments in gas detection, sewage treatment and medical use of x-rays. A gifted artist and musician, Webster also helped found the Blackheath Concert Halls and the adjacent Conservatoire in Blackheath in south-east London during the 1890s.

== Career ==
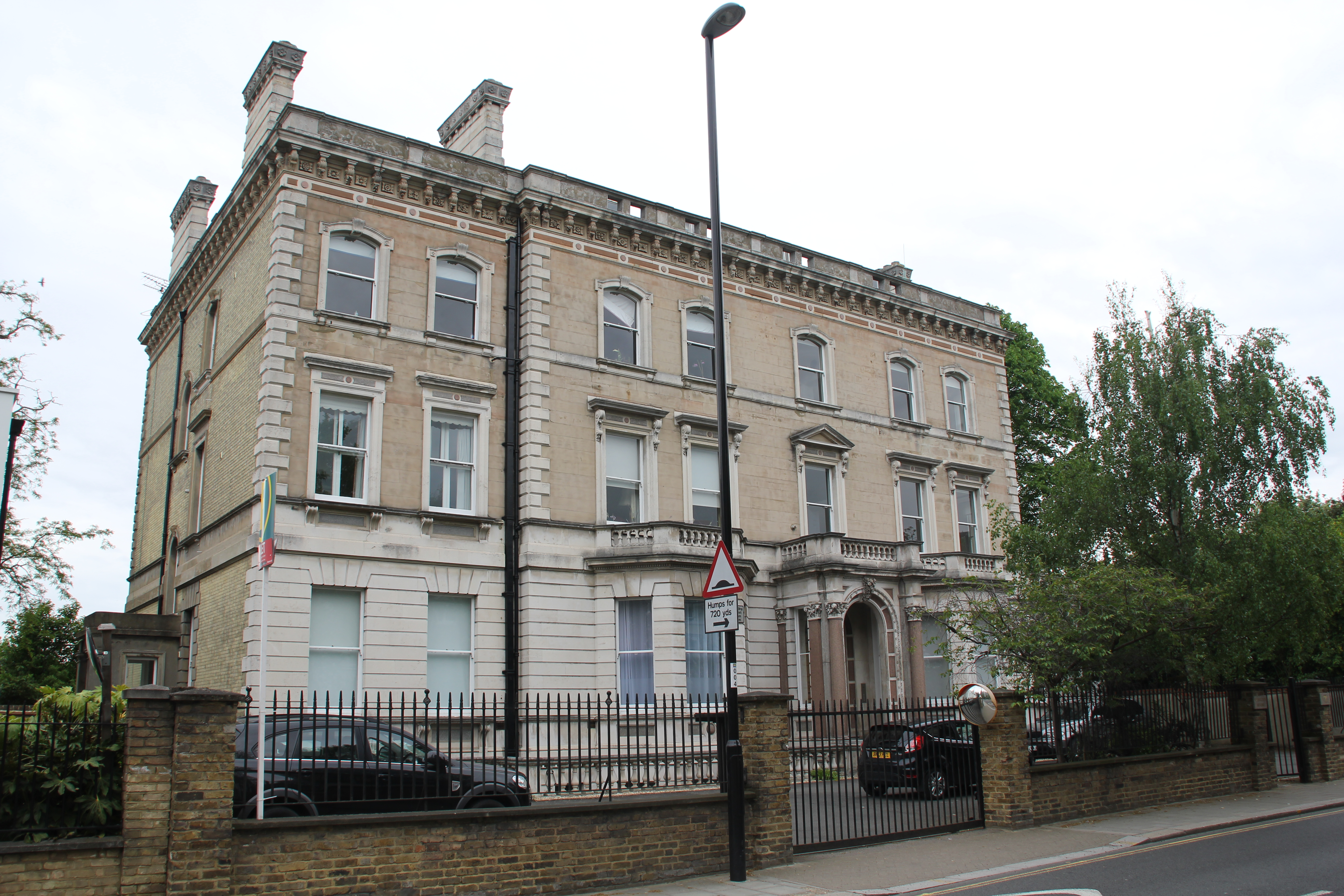
Wyberton House

Webster was the son of William Webster, a successful building contractor who grew wealthy from constructing major civil engineering and building projects in London. The family lived from 1869 in Wyberton House in Lee Terrace, Blackheath.

The younger William Webster trained as a chemical engineer. A fellow of the Chemical Society, he patented a system to detect hydrogenous gases in mines in 1876, and later developed a system for the electrolytic purification of sewage (patent application filed on 22 December 1887; US patent awarded on 19 February 1889), trialled in 1888 at the Crossness Southern Outfall works which had been built by his father's firm in the 1860s.

Webster was also a pioneer in x-ray research and a founder member of the Röntgen Society (since 1927 part of the British Institute of Radiology), assisting surgeon Thomas Moore in producing radiographs in 1896, after which Moore set up an x-ray unit at the Miller General Hospital in Greenwich High Road. Webster is also believed to be the first person to experience radiation 'sunburn', suffered on his right hand. He wrote a letter on the subject of x-ray photography published in the journal Nature in 1897.

Webster was an accomplished violinist, singer, and artist - his paintings were exhibited in the Summer Exhibition at the Royal Academy. In 1881 local residents formed the Blackheath Conservatoire of Music, and Webster founded the company which funded the building of a concert hall, today Blackheath Halls, and its neighbouring schools for art and music, the Blackheath Conservatoire. The Conservatoire of Music opened in 1896 and the School of Art in 1897.
