= Flat Creek =

Flat Creek may refer to:

== Places ==
- Flat Creek, Idaho, U.S.
- Flat Creek, North Carolina, U.S.
- Flat Creek, Tennessee, U.S.
- Flat Creek, Prince Edward Island, Canada
- Flat Creek, a community in Yukon, Canada
- Flat Creek Ranch, Jackson Hole, Wyoming, U.S.
- Flat Creek Township, Barry County, Missouri, U.S.
- Flat Creek Township, Pettis County, Missouri, U.S.

== Rivers and streams ==
=== Georgia ===
- Flat Creek (Chattahoochee River), a stream in Georgia, U.S.
- Flat Creek (Lake Lanier), a stream in Georgia, U.S.
- Flat Creek, a tributary of the Ocmulgee River, Georgia, U.S.

=== Missouri ===
- Flat Creek (Bourbeuse River), a stream in Missouri, U.S.
- Flat Creek (James River), a stream in Missouri, U.S.
- Flat Creek (Lamine River), a stream in Missouri, U.S.
- Flat Creek (Little Black River), a stream in Missouri, U.S.
- Flat Creek (Meramec River), a stream in Missouri, U.S.
- Flat Creek (Middle Fork Salt River), a stream in Missouri, U.S.

=== New York ===
- Flat Creek (Mohawk River tributary), a stream in New York, U.S.

=== North Carolina ===
- Flat Creek (Swannanoa River tributary), a stream in Buncombe County, North Carolina, U.S.
- Flat Creek (Little River tributary), a stream in Hoke County, North Carolina, U.S.
- Flat Creek (Deep River tributary), a stream in Randolph County, North Carolina, U.S.

=== Virginia ===
- Flat Creek (Virginia), U.S.
- Flat Creek (Stewarts Creek tributary), a stream in Carroll County, Virginia

=== Washington, D.C. ===
- Flat Creek (Columbia River), a stream in Washington, U.S.
