= Flat Creek (Lake Lanier) =

Stream in Georgia

Coordinates: 34°16′53″N 83°49′31″W

Flat Creek is a stream in Georgia, and is a tributary of the Chattahoochee River in Lake Lanier. The creek is approximately 5.09 miles (8.19 km) long.

== Course ==
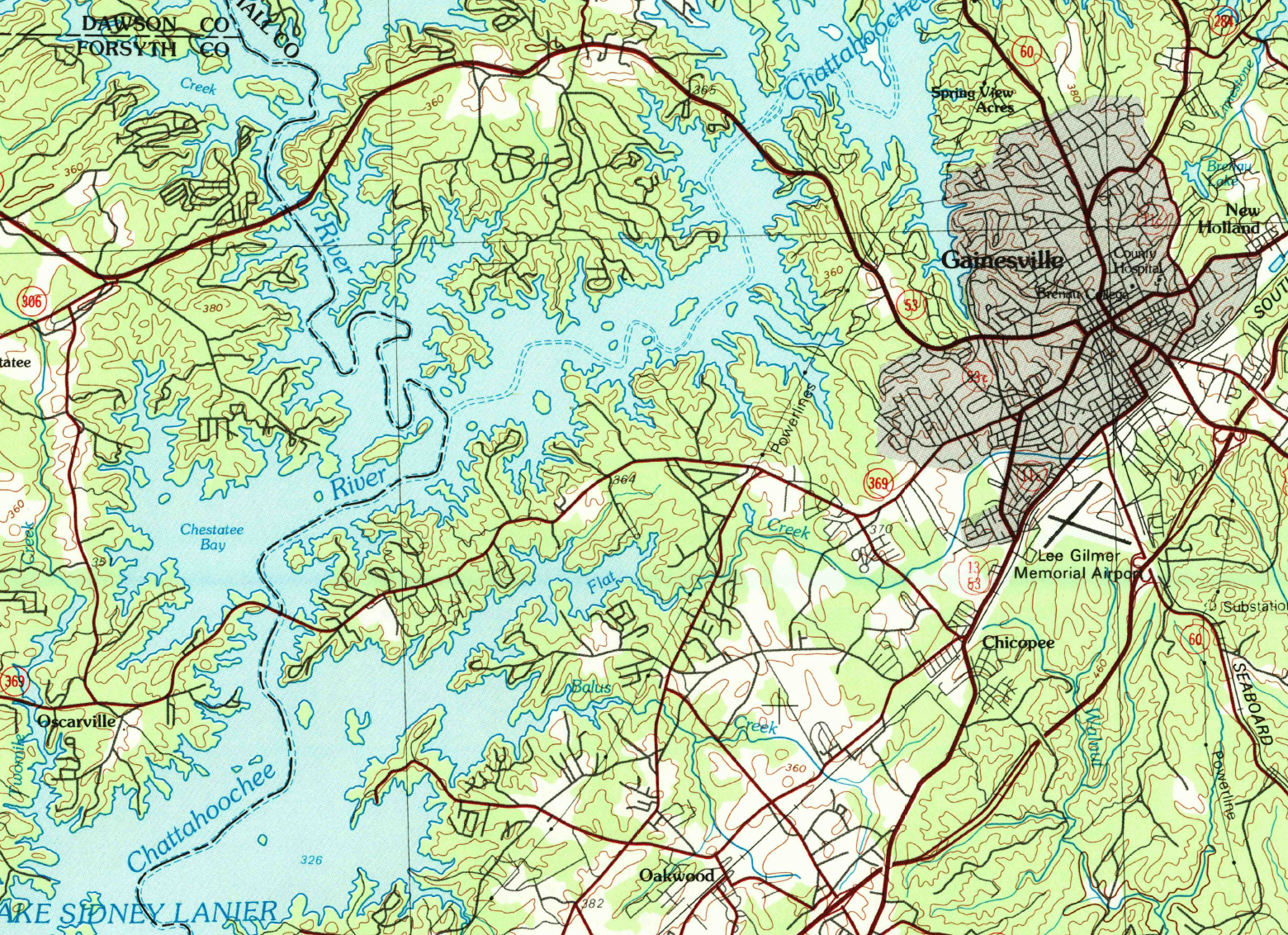
Topographic map showing Flat Creek and Lake Lanier

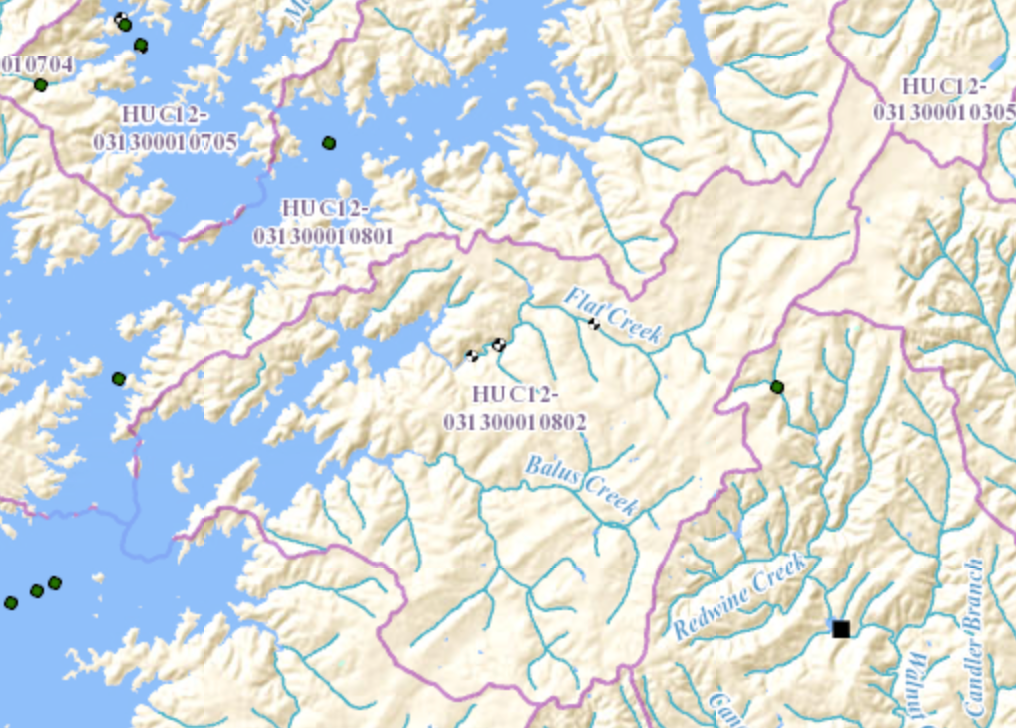
Map showing Flat Creek and its sub-watershed (outlined in pink), and Lake Lanier

Flat Creek rises in Gainesville, Georgia in Hall County, just north of Lee Gilmer Memorial Airport, and immediately west of State Route 60. The creek heads in a westerly direction, and crosses State Route 13/State Route 53 within a few hundred yards, then curves to the southwest, paralleling State Route 369 to its north. Just east of McEver Road, Flat Creek turns to the south, then back to the west to cross McEver Road, and flows into Lake Lanier in the Flat Creek arm of the lake, which is separated from the Chattahoochee River arm by a peninsula which is bisected by State Route 369, and which is accessed by Browns Bridge coming from Forsyth County.

== Sub-watershed details ==
The creek watershed and associated waters is designated by the United States Geological Survey as sub-watershed HUC 031300010802, is named the Flat Creek sub-watershed, and drains an area of approximately 21 square miles southwest of Gainesville. Flat Creek drains the northern portion of this watershed, while the southern portion around the community of Oakwood is drained by Balus Creek, which flows into Lake Lanier south of the Flat Creek arm of the lake.

== Water quality and impairment ==
=== Early monitoring study ===
From May 1987 to April 1990, water quality monitoring was conducted at eight locations on Lake Lanier, including Flat Creek. The study included thirteen water quality tests conducted twice monthly throughout the three-year period. Samples were taken of both sediment and water at each site to detect pollution trends and the presence of heavy metals. Results published in 1991 indicated that elevated levels of nitrogen and phosphorus were concentrated in streams running through poultry processing areas, while the heaviest loads of oxygen-depleting pollutants were found in urban streams. Zinc and copper were also present at detectable levels within each water sample, and various sediment samples contained trace concentrations of metals.

=== State impairment listings and TMDL development ===
Under sections 305(b) and 303(d) of the federal Clean Water Act (CWA), states are required to assess water quality every two years, publish integrated reports listing waterbodies that do not meet the applicable criteria for their designated use(s), and develop a total maximum daily load (TMDL) to limit identified pollutants. Based on studies conducted from 1998 to 2003, the Georgia Department of Natural Resources (DNR) Environmental Protection Division (EPD) identified Flat Creek as one of 25 impaired stream segments in the Chattahoochee River Basin due to sedimentation and impacts to aquatic biota. Because its biological condition was rated as "very poor", the stream was classified as not supporting its designated use for fishing.

In its 2002 and 2004 assessments, the EPD identified fecal coliform (FC) bacteria from urban runoff (UR) as Flat Creek's primary cause of impairment. A TMDL was completed for FC bacteria in 2003 and revised in 2008, establishing an 83% FC bacteria reduction target. Recommended measures included sewer and septic system maintenance, improved stormwater management, and continued monitoring. Following the 2004 assessment, the stream was also listed for biological impairment (Bio F) due to sediment impacts to its fish community. A separate TMDL addressing sediment-related Bio F was completed in 2008, establishing a 71.70% sediment load reduction target for urban runoff and recommending continued monitoring and improved management practices for construction, forestry, mining, roads, and urban development.

Following the completion of these TMDLs, Flat Creek has continued to appear on every EPD integrated report for not supporting its designated fishing use. In 2022, the EPD published a bacteria indicator supplement changing the primary indicator of fecal contamination from FC bacteria to Escherichia coli (E. coli), citing its stronger link to gastrointestinal illness, and updated this classification in the state's 2024 integrated report. The draft 2026 assessment proposed the addition of ammonia toxicity to the list of impairment causes, attributed to localized municipal discharge, while E. coli and Bio F remain attributed to urban runoff.

=== Chattahoochee Riverkeeper's monitoring and advocacy ===
Chattahoochee Riverkeeper (CRK) first began monitoring Flat Creek following a fish kill event reported in 2009, investigating whether stormwater discharges from nearby poultry processing plants were contributing to water quality impacts. In 2012, after unsuccessful attempts to work with these poultry plants, CRK established a long-term water quality monitoring program.

To investigate potential sources of bacterial contamination, CRK collected water samples throughout the creek mainly during rain events, focusing particularly on locations near industrial areas and poultry plants, including Pilgrim's Pride and Mar-Jac Poultry. The organization's testing revealed high concentrations of bacteria in both industrial stormwater runoff and Flat Creek. Storm drain samples reportedly contained bacterial levels over 10,000 times the level recommended by the United States Environmental Protection Agency (EPA), while stream samples found concentrations more than 1,000 times the recommended level. At one point, stream samples collected near the Pilgrim's Pride facility contained bacterial levels over 55 times Georgia's water quality standard of 235 most probable number (MPN) per 100 milliliters. After years of independent data collection, CRK brought its findings to the media and environmental agencies, and the EPA took enforcement actions against both Pilgrim's Pride and Mar-Jac Poultry in 2014.

CRK has continued to monitor Flat Creek's water quality through its Neighborhood Water Watch program. Volunteers collect stream samples weekly and deliver them to the organization's laboratory, where the samples are analyzed to identify ongoing sources of pollution.

== Documented pollution events ==
=== July 2009 fish kill ===
In 2009, CRK contacted the EPD after a Gainesville resident reported dead fish floating in Flat Creek. State investigators documented approximately 140 dead fish, along with "gray-colored sludge, floating debris, and putrescent foam entering the creek below the outfalls from the [Pilgrim's Pride] facility." The EPD investigation concluded without identifying a definitive cause.

Separately, a CRK review of state files found that the plant had been releasing polluted rainwater into the stream for years without management, annual reports to the EPD showing stormwater discharges exceeding pollutant limits. Multiple complaints were made by CRK after the fish kill, raising concerns about the facility's stormwater management and the state's enforcement response, and the facility was eventually issued notices of violation by the EPD.

=== October 2020 raw sewage spill ===
Overnight on October 10–11, 2020, heavy rainfall caused an estimated 2 million gallons of raw sewage to overflow into Flat Creek from the Flat Creek Water Reclamation Facility. Nearly five inches of rain fell overnight, overwhelming the facility's pumping capacity and flooding the pump station with over 10 feet of water. Facility operators discovered the pump failure early Sunday, October 11, but flooding prevented staff from accessing the station for several hours.

Water quality testing done October 11–12 showed elevated E. coli levels downstream of the spill, reaching 340,000 coli/100 mL on Sunday and 450,000 coli/100 mL on Monday, compared to Flat Creek's benchmark of 500 coli/100 mL. Dissolved oxygen and pH levels remained within acceptable ranges both days. Additional testing by CRK on October 13 found E. coli concentrations of 5,580 coli/100 mL near the facility and 3,200 coli/100 mL near where the stream meets Lake Lanier.

Three temporary pumps were placed into the station by October 13 to prevent further overflows. The spill affected approximately two miles of Flat Creek upstream of Lake Lanier, according to the Gainesville Department of Water Resources (DWR), and CRK advised the public to avoid contact with the water until bacterial levels declined. DWR completed repairs and replacements on all eight facility pumps and the spill was reported to the EPD.

=== July 2022 soybean spill ===
On July 29, 2022, three Norfolk Southern train cars derailed near the headwaters of Flat Creek. According to the EPD, at least one held an estimated 200–300 tons of soybeans, exceeding its 226,000-pound (113-ton) maximum capacity, resulting in approximately a third of the cargo spilling into the stream. Norfolk Southern initially stated that the spill was restricted to its property. After heavy rainfall in early August, agency officials determined that uncontained soybeans had washed farther downstream, spreading the contamination at least two miles along the creek.

On August 12, following reports of soybean accumulation and dead fish in Flat Creek, CRK began investigating. The organization found that as the soybeans decomposed, bacteria consumed large amounts of dissolved oxygen (DO), dropping the stream's levels to below what fish and aquatic macroinvertebrate life need to survive. CRK documented DO levels below Georgia's water quality standard of 5 mg/L, with readings dropping below 1 mg/L in more severely affected areas. The EPD estimated that nearly 100 fish died, including 21 bluegill and 74 mosquitofish documented in the initial report. However, the report stated that the count was likely an underestimate due to poor water clarity and accumulated soybeans concealing any fish beneath the water's surface.

Norfolk Southern conducted a two-month cleanup that removed over 440 tons of soybean waste and used aerators placed along the stream to restore dissolved oxygen levels. The company also paid a $10,000 penalty issued by the EPD in February 2023. CRK continued to monitor Flat Creek's oxygen levels for several months, eventually documenting the return of normal dissolved oxygen levels and fish.

=== July 2026 wastewater spill ===
In July 2026, approximately 5.97 million gallons of raw sewage overflowed into Flat Creek from the Flat Creek Water Reclamation Facility. According to DWR officials, nearly six inches of rainfall occurred in two to three hours, causing flooding that overwhelmed the facility's influent pump station. The resulting discharge reduced dissolved oxygen levels below Georgia water quality standards, leaving the stream unable to support certain aquatic life. Once contacted, the EPD investigation classified the overflow impacts on Flat Creek as a fish kill event. DWR issued a press release confirming that the overflow was resolved and necessary testing protocols were implemented. Monitoring and reporting to the EPD was required for 12 months following the discharge.

== See also ==
- Water Resource Region
- South Atlantic-Gulf Water Resource Region
- Apalachicola basin
