= Gladys Wyant Performing Arts Pavilion =

Performing arts venue

Coordinates: 34°17′51″N 83°49′42″W

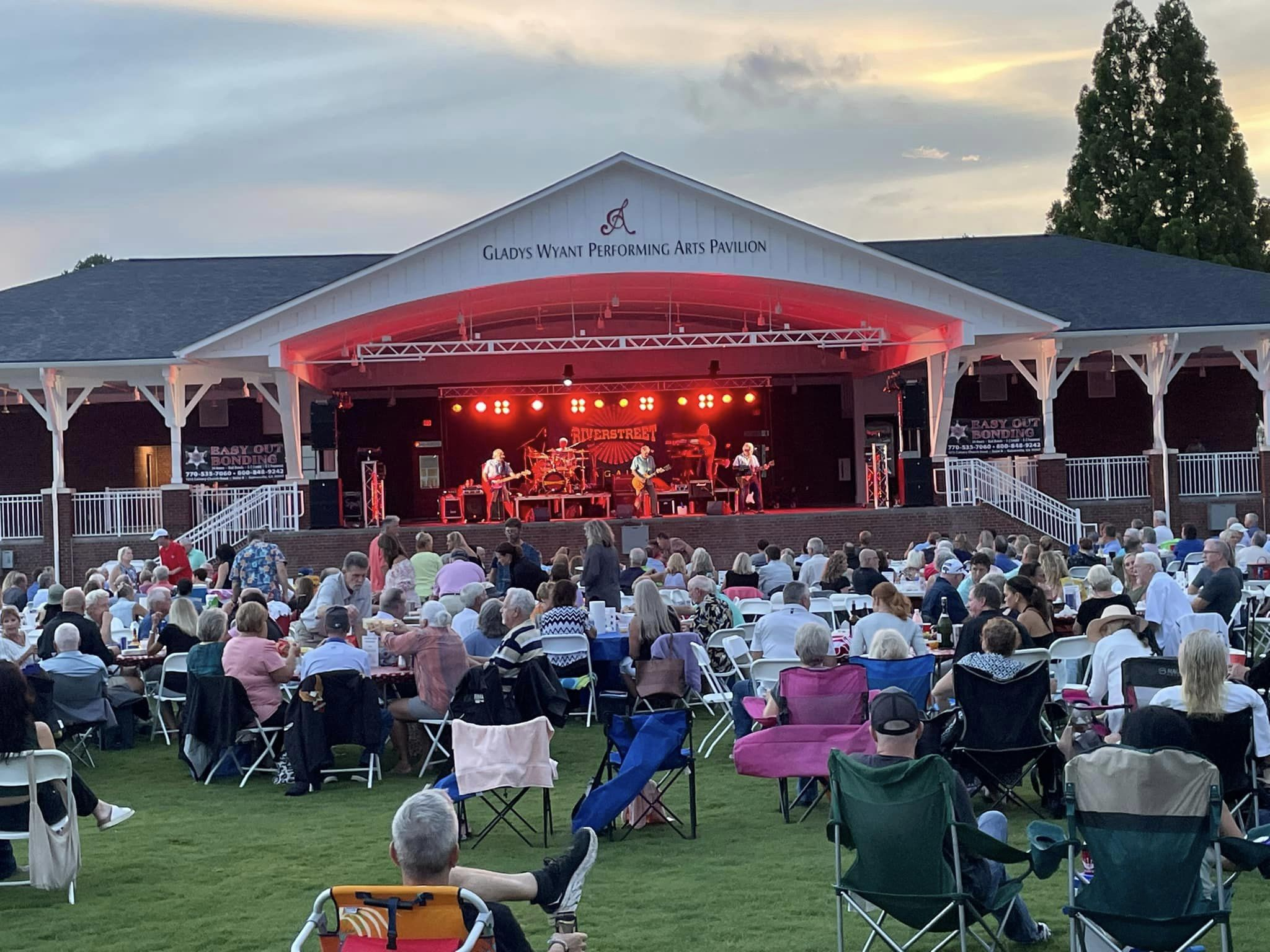
Riverstreet concert at the Gladys Wyant Performing Arts Pavilion

The Gladys Wyant Performing Arts Pavilion is a 6,300 sq. ft. multi-functional facility used for concerts and other performing arts events in Gainesville, Georgia, US. The venue is also used to host weddings, corporate events and dinners. The venue is located on The Arts Council's Smithgall Arts Center complex in downtown Gainesville.

== Groundbreaking and construction ==
Actual groundbreaking was in early January, 2020. Ceremonial groundbreaking for this facility was on January 29, 2020 with community leaders, volunteers, arts patrons and Arts Council staff in attendance. Executive Director of The Arts Council, Gladys Wyant, and Gainesville Mayor, Danny Dunagan spoke to the crowd about the importance of The Arts Council and this new venue, stressing the importance of the organization's ability to serve Gainesville and the broader North Georgia community for both a cultural and economic impact. Also in attendance was Lessie Smithgall, who, with her late husband Charles A. Smithgall Jr, have been longtime patrons of the arts and The Arts Council, lending their name to the complex where the pavilion resides.

Work completed on the venue early January 2021. The official ribbon cutting and dedication took place on April 16, 2021 and the venue was officially named after the Executive Director, Gladys Wyant, who had held that role for more than 37 years and was instrumental in the acquisition of the original property from CSX Transportation in 1992. the complete renovation and expansion that followed shortly after, as well as the addition of the new pavilion.

== Gladys Wyant ==
Gladys Wyant with husband, Joe, at The Art's Council annual Black and White Ball

Gladys Wyant is a figure in the cultural and arts community of Gainesville, Georgia and the State of Georgia. Throughout her career, she has focused on the arts scene, community development, and historic preservation. Wyant is celebrated for her leadership, involvement in arts organizations, and service to various community initiatives.

=== Career and contributions ===
==== The Arts Council ====
Gladys Wyant's was Executive Director of The Arts Council in Gainesville, GA. She transformed it from a modest office in the Green Street Station building with $25,000 in assets into an organization with three separate properties and assets totaling $8 million.

==== Cultural leadership ====
She was a founding member of the Gainesville Symphony Orchestra, a board member of Children's Theater, now known as WonderQuest. She served as the President of the Georgia Assembly of Community Arts Agencies, Georgia Citizens for the Arts, Georgia Arts Network, Main Street Gainesville, Gainesville-Hall and Lake Lanier Convention and Visitors Bureau, and Gainesville Kiwanis. Her involvement with these organizations showcased her commitment to the betterment of the community through the arts.

==== Advocacy and recognition ====
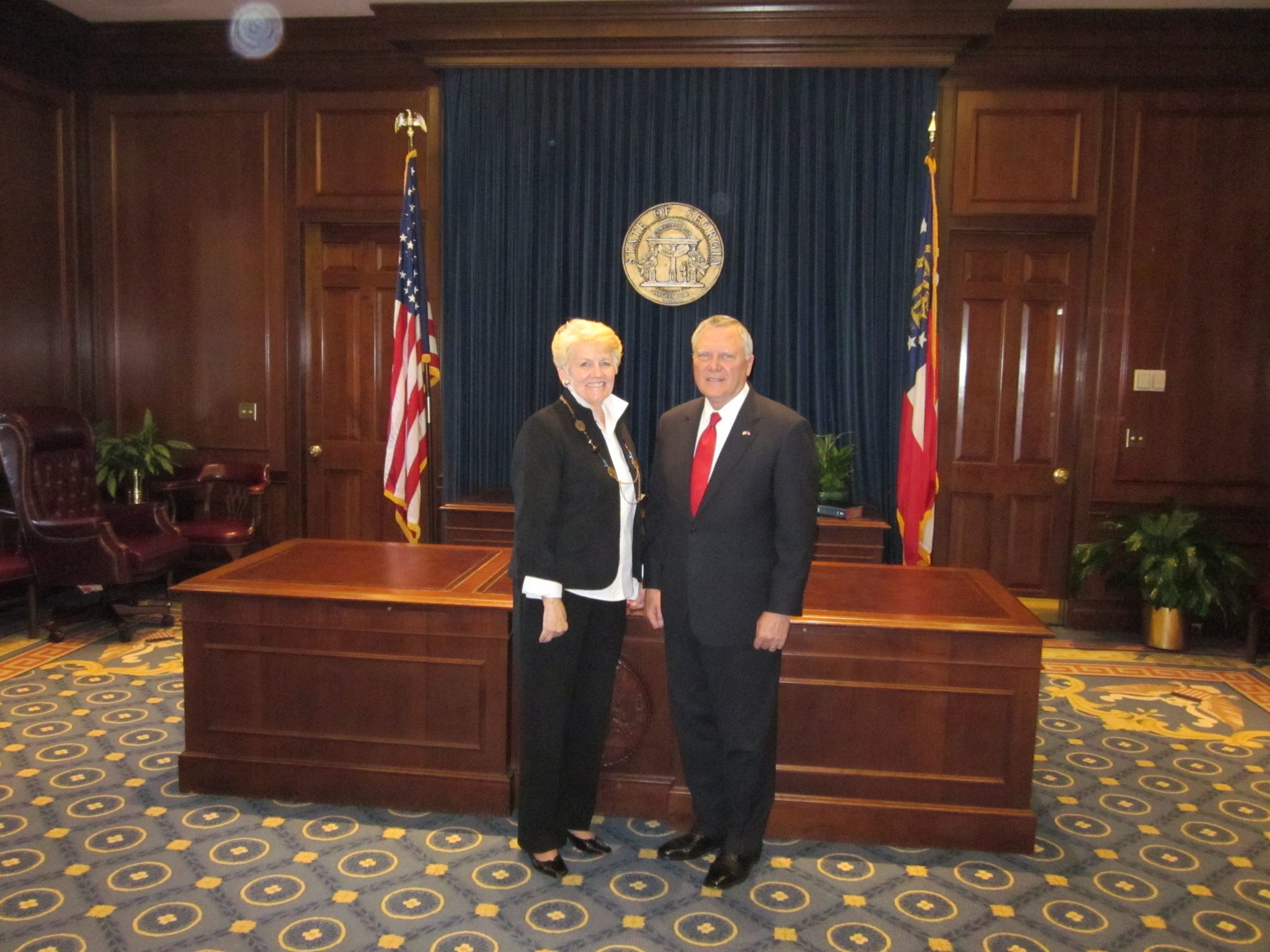
Gladys Wyant and Governor Nathan Deal on her appointment to the Georgia Council for the Arts Board. Feb 2011

She was a Board Member of the Georgia Council for the Arts, appointed by Governors Nathan Deal and Brian Kemp. In addition to the GCA, Governor Deal appointed Wyant to the Arts Learning Task Force, in 2014, to better incorporated arts in Georgia's K-12 education.

During the 2020 pandemic, Wyant along with several Georgia artists like R.E.M. and Andre 3000 and arts executives worked to lobby for the “Save Our Stages Act” and "RESTART Act.", urging the 2 Georgia Senators, Kelly Loeffler and David Perdue to support the bills that would set up relief funds for small arts venues during the shutdowns.

Her retirement from The Arts Council in 2021 was marked by the Georgia Senate with Senate Resolution 867, which honored her achievements and contributions to art and culture. Since her retirement in 2021, Wyant has continued to serve as a GCA Board Member and was named Chairperson by Governor Brian Kemp in October 2023.

== Performances ==
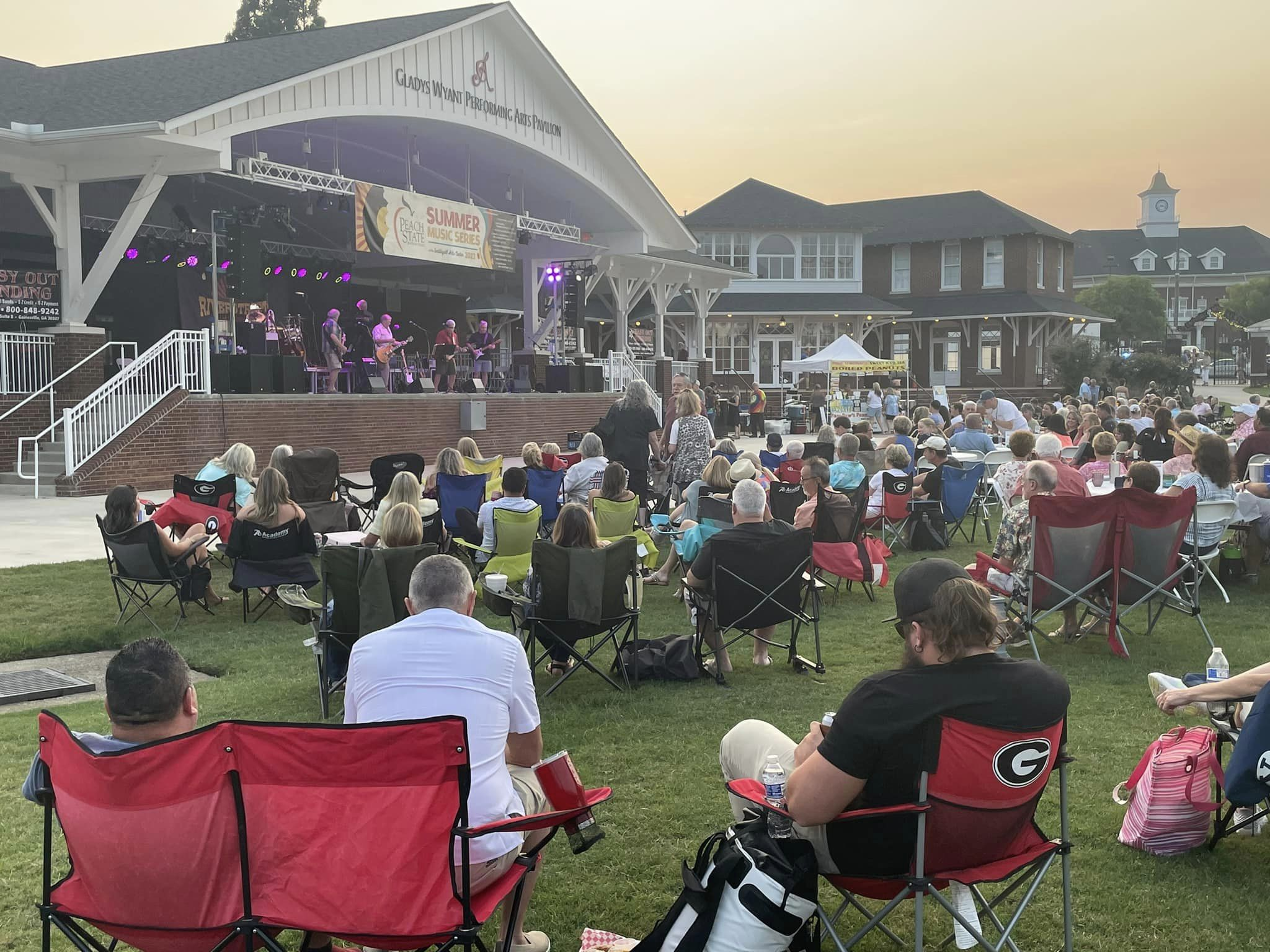
Smithgall Arts Center complex, including the Gladys Wyant Performing Arts Pavilion

Since opening, "The Gladys", as the venue is affectionately known by the local community, has hosted numerous acts like Banks & Shane, Northwards Symphonic Band, Back in Time, The Highwaymen Live, Riverstreet, Nashville Yacht Club Band, Mike Farris, Peabo Bryson, Jonathan Moody Band, Electric Avenue, Fly Betty, Tribute: A Celebration of the Allman Brothers Band, The Marcel Portilla Band and Mary Kate Farmer.

The venue is the host to Gainesville's annual Oktoberfest celebration; a community event feature all day entertainment, beer, food and activities for all ages.
