= 2020 Colonial Pipeline oil spill =

Oil spill in Mecklenburg County, North Carolina

- Interactive map of 2020 Colonial Pipeline oil spill
- Location: Mecklenburg County, North Carolina, United States
- Coordinates: 35°24′52″N 80°48′23″W
- Date: July 27, 2020 (Note: The spill was discovered on August 14, 2020, but later investigations revealed that gasoline had been leaking from the pipeline since at least July 27, 2020.)

Cause
- Cause: Leak caused by a crack in a repair sleeve
- Operator: Colonial Pipeline Company

Spill characteristics
- Volume: 2,000,000 US gallons (7.6 ML)

A major oil spill from the Colonial Pipeline in a nature reserve near Huntersville, North Carolina, United States, began on July 27, 2020. The spill resulted in approximately 2,000,000 US gallons (7.6 ML) of gasoline discharge and led to a cleanup effort that is still ongoing and expected to continue for several years. Several sources have noted that the spill is one of the largest in the history of the United States, with EnergyWire calling it "the largest U.S. gasoline pipeline spill on record".

The Colonial Pipeline is the largest fuel pipeline system in the country, running for 5,500 miles (8,900 km) from Texas to New Jersey. In North Carolina, the system includes a 40-inch (1.0 m) diameter gasoline pipe. On August 14, two teenagers in Mecklenburg County discovered a puddle of gasoline near a buried section of this pipe in the Oehler Nature Preserve and alerted authorities. Within days, the Colonial Pipeline Company shut down that section of the pipeline and brought in over 200 workers to help repair the pipe and begin cleanup efforts. The pipe was in operation within five days of the spill being noticed after a cracked section of the pipe containing a Type A sleeve from a previous repair from 2004 was replaced. At the same time, the company estimated that about 63,000 US gal (240 kL) had leaked. However, as the cleanup continued over the next several months, the estimate continued to grow, and by July 2022, the revised estimate was 2,000,000 US gal (7.6 ML), making it one of the largest gasoline spills in U.S. history. Additionally, the company discovered that corrosion issues with the type of sleeve used in the 2004 repair was the cause of the leak. In November 2021, the North Carolina Department of Environmental Quality sued the company over the spill, eventually agreeing to a consent decree wherein the company would pay nearly $5 million in penalties and take several actions ordered by the department, including monthly and quarterly testing on nearby water sources, providing additional information on the size of the spill, and submitting a corrective action plan and schedule to the department. By July 2022, the company had identified and replaced all other Type A sleeves on their line, costing them $50 million. Additionally, cleanup efforts in Mecklenburg County, which had cost the company $50 million to that point, were ongoing and expected to last for several more years.

== Background ==
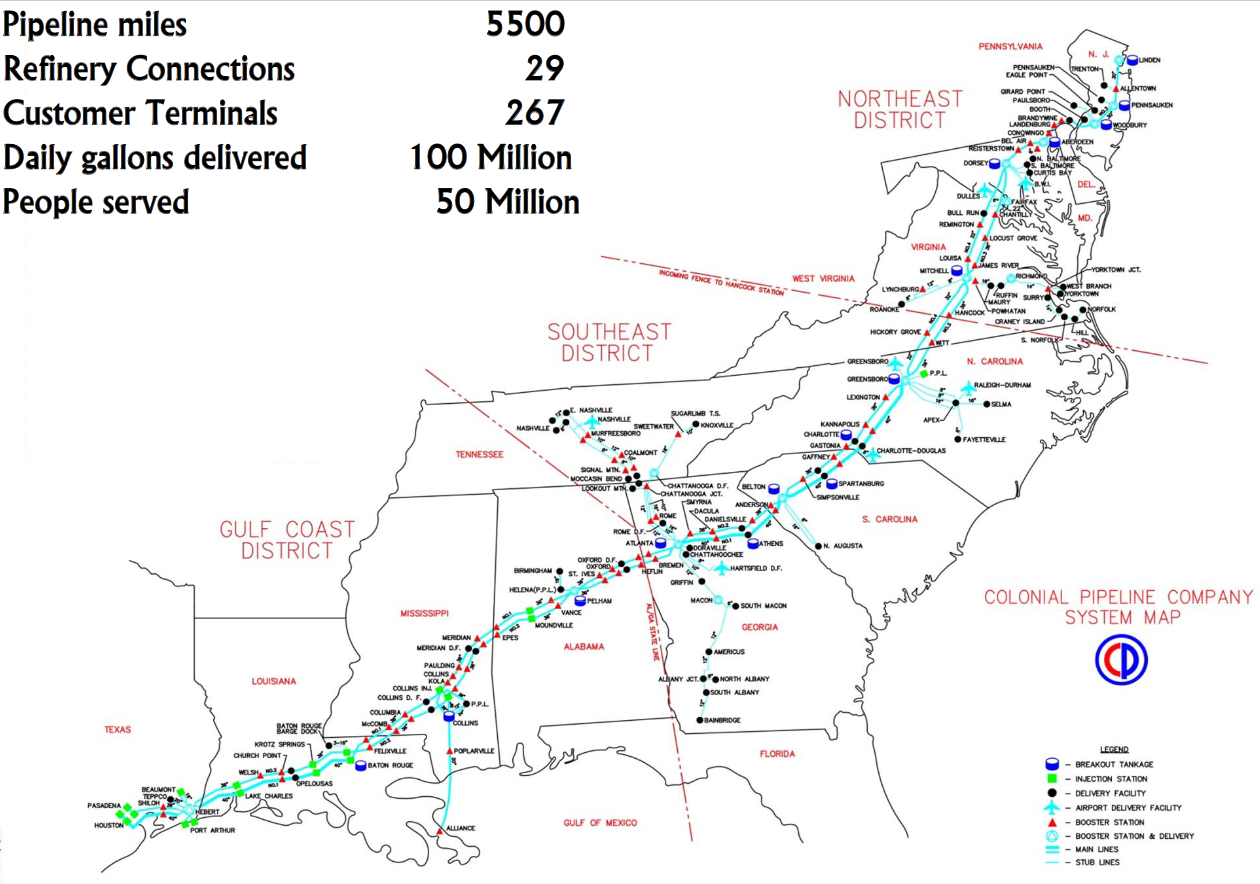
A 2012 map of the pipeline system

The Colonial Pipeline is the largest fuel pipeline system in the United States, stretching for 5,500 miles (8,900 km) from Houston to Linden, New Jersey, in the New York metropolitan area. The system, which is owned by a subsidiary company that has investors including Koch Industries and Shell, transports petroleum products from the Gulf Coast to various points along the Eastern Seaboard, with a daily throughput of about 100,000,000 U.S. gallons (380 ML). In North Carolina, the system consists of two parallel pipes: a 40-inch (1.0 m) diameter pipe transporting gasoline and a 36-inch (910 mm) one carrying other oil products, such as jet fuel. This section of the pipeline had been built in 1978 and included a segment that passed near Charlotte, North Carolina. While the area was mostly rural at the time of the construction, by 2020, the location was experiencing an increase in development due to a growth in the Charlotte metropolitan area.

Throughout its history, the pipeline has seen several notable safety incidents and oil spills. In the 1990s, two spills from the pipeline in the Southeastern United States resulted in an investigation by the National Transportation Safety Board, leading to changes in how the federal government investigated pipeline accidents. This included a spill that damaged the Reedy River in South Carolina, which was one of the worst natural disasters in the state's history. Additionally, in a 2016 incident, the pipeline leaked approximately 300,000 U.S. gal (1.1 ML) in a spill near Birmingham, Alabama. In later repair work related to the spill, two contractors were killed and four injured in an explosion and subsequent fire while performing excavator work. According to the Pipeline and Hazardous Materials Safety Administration (PHMSA, an agency of the United States Department of Transportation), the pipeline ranked seventh among fuel and oil pipelines for the number of accidents "impacting people and the environment" (IPE), but when adjusted for its length and the amount of fuel carried, it performed better than many other pipelines. Additionally, consulting firm RPC, Inc. found that, among the ten largest pipelines in the United States, the Colonial Pipeline Company had the lowest rate of IPE accidents affecting their pipelines, and in early August 2020, the American Petroleum Institute announced that the company was awarded its "Distinguished Pipeline Safety Award" based on its performance in 2019. The announcement came just four days before a leak was discovered in North Carolina.

== Oil spill ==
=== Identification and initial response ===
On August 14, 2020, two teenagers were riding all-terrain vehicles in the Oehler Nature Preserve in Mecklenburg County, North Carolina, when they noticed a puddle of gasoline bubbling up from the ground. The location of the puddle in the preserve was near the intersection of Huntersville-Concord Road and Asbury Chapel Road, about 2 mi (3 km) east of downtown Huntersville, North Carolina. The teenagers called 9-1-1 and firefighters were on the scene about ten minutes later. The gasoline was coming from a leak in the Colonial Pipeline, which ran through the nature preserve at a buried depth of about 5 ft (1.5 m). Two days earlier, pipeline workers had flown over the area and had not noticed the spill. Upon notification of the leak, the Colonial Pipeline Company set up a cleanup and repair operation that involved over 200 workers. Operating under an Incident Command System, they worked around the clock to clean the area of the petroleum product, especially working to ensure that gasoline did not reach a nearby creek.

In initial reports issued as early as August 17, they estimated that the pipeline had leaked roughly 63,000 U.S. gal (240 kL). During the cleanup and repair process, the company discovered that it had been the gasoline-only pipeline that was causing the leak, with the pipe shut down for about five days before it was repaired and put back into operation. As a result, gasoline flow had resumed by September. The leak had been caused by a crack in the pipe, specifically on a section of pipe had been repaired several years earlier in 2004, with a metal sleeve being applied to fix what EnergyWire described as an "anomaly" with the pipe. By August 18, the company reported that a majority of the estimated oil that had been spilled had been recovered. Due to the spill, the North Carolina Department of Environmental Quality (NCDEQ) also required the company to do testing on drinking wells within a 1,500 ft (460 m) radius of the spill. By early September, the company reported that, after several rounds of testing, no oil had been found within nearby wells.

=== Cleanup efforts through 2020 ===
On September 8, at a meeting of the Huntersville town board, a representative of Colonial stated that they were asking residents who lived within 1,500 feet (500 m) of the site to have their drinking wells closed and offered to pay the residents $1,000, in addition to having their houses connected to municipal water services. However, several residents expressed frustration with the terms of the contracts the company were offering them, which they said would allow the company access to their property. Also in early September, North Carolina Senator Natasha Marcus, who represents north Mecklenburg County, stated that the company had notified her that they believed their initial estimate of 63,000 US gal (240 kL) was lower than the actual amount and that they may put forward a higher figure in an incident report to regulators that was due on September 15. In the report, the company stated that, after extensive testing, they now estimated that about 272,580 U.S. gal (1,032 kL) had leaked, over four times their initial estimate. Additionally, the company stated that, while the pipeline had a SCADA safety system in place, it had not reported a drop in pressure at the time of the leak. The company also stated that the spill would cost them approximately $10.3 million, with at least $2.5 million set aside for environmental cleanup efforts, including the removal of contaminated soil and groundwater.

On September 25, multiple news sources reported that the NCDEQ had issued a citation in the form of a notice of violation to the company, stating that samples of groundwater in the area contained levels of chemicals introduced by the spill that were higher than state-acceptable standards. These chemicals included benzene, ethylbenzene, toluene, and xylene, with the former being considered a carcinogen. As part of the citation, the company was required to restore the local groundwater to acceptable levels. Additionally, the company was given a deadline of January 20, 2021, to submit a comprehensive report on the incident. By the first week of November, the NCDEQ was also asking the company to update its estimate, believing that the 272,580 gallons was still too low an estimate. By this time, the company had recovered about 267,313 U.S. gal (1,012 kL) and further efforts were removing an additional 3,000 U.S. gal (11 kL) to 5,000 U.S. gal (19 kL) per day. Around the same time, the company removed a portion of the damaged pipe that had caused the spill in order to do metallurgical studies on it.

By November 12, the NCDEQ reported that roughly 311,000 U.S. gal (1,180 kL) had been collected from the site, making it the largest gasoline spill in the state's history. By this time, the company had drilled about 100 wells to identify the extent of the spill and reported that it did not appear to be growing in size past what the company defined as the affected area. By this point, in addition to the gasoline, the company had excavated about 4,000 short tons (3,600 t) of contaminated soil, which they were transporting to the Charlotte Motor Speedway Landfill in Concord, North Carolina. Meanwhile, collected gasoline was sent to a recycling company in Ohio, while contaminated water was sent to a recovery facility in Asheboro, North Carolina. The company dealt with gasoline vapors by using high-powered vacuums and on-site flame oxidizers to burn off the fumes. By December 31, the company estimated that the size of the spill was 492,339 U.S. gal (1,864 kL).

=== Early 2021 ===
On January 21, 2021, with the company's submission of its comprehensive, 1,600-page report to the NCDEQ, the official estimate for the size of the spill was approximately 1,200,000 U.S. gal (4,500,000 L), making it one of the largest gasoline spills in United States history. Of this amount, the company stated that only about half of this total (661,668 U.S. gal (2,504,690 L)) had been collected. Additionally, the company stated that the estimate could continue to grow as cleanup efforts continued. By February, the company reported that about two-thirds of the estimated 1.2 million gallons of gasoline, as well as 200,000 U.S. gal (760,000 L) of contaminated water, had been collected. At this point, the company had spent about $25 million in cleanup efforts, including $11 million for environmental remediation.

By the end of February, the NCDEQ issued a "Notice of Continuing Violation" to the company and specified 22 "corrective actions" the company needed to take to address the spill. Among these actions, the department required the company to expand the radius of drinking well inspections an additional 500 ft (150 m), install additional deep testing wells to more accurately determine the vertical extent of the oil, and to provide the department with better documentation on how the company determined its estimates on the amount of spilled gasoline. The NCDEQ gave the company a deadline of April 26 to institute the prescribed measures. The department also gave this as the deadline for the company to revise its overall report, which they said was lacking enough information for the department to determine the full impact of the spill. Speaking about Colonial's response to the spill and the estimates they had given to that point, Secretary of Environmental Quality Dionne Delli-Gatti said, "It is unacceptable that for eight months Colonial Pipeline has been unable to provide a reliable accounting of the amount of gasoline released into this community. We will take all necessary steps and exercise all available authority to hold Colonial Pipeline accountable for what has become one of the largest gasoline spills in the country".

(Our) ongoing investigation indicates that conditions may exist on the Colonial Pipeline System that pose a pipeline integrity risk to public safety, property or the environment. The conditions that led to the failure potentially exist throughout the Colonial Pipeline System. Further, Colonial's inability to effectively detect and respond to this release, as well as other past releases, has potentially exacerbated the impacts of this and numerous other failures over the operational history of Colonial's entire system. After evaluating the preliminary findings of fact described below and considering the characteristics of the Colonial Pipeline System, as well as the failure history of that system, it appears that the continued operation of the Colonial Pipeline System without corrective measures would pose a pipeline integrity risk to public safety, property, or the environment.

— Excerpt from a proposed order submitted by the Pipeline and Hazardous Materials Safety Administration, March 29, 2021.

By April 12, the company stated that 85 percent of the estimated 1.2 million gallons of leaked gasoline had been recovered, though the NCDEQ believed that this estimate was too low considering that the amount of gasoline collected daily had remained at between 3,000 and 5,000 gallons. Additionally, 3D mapping of the area showed that the gasoline had seeped deeper into the ground than initially thought. Around this same time, PHMSA reported that the leak had been caused by a defect in the "Type A" sleeve used in the 2004 repair of the pipe. The agency also noted that this type of repair was highly susceptible to similar failures and that many portions of the pipeline had used this type of repair in the past. As a result, PHMSA issued a proposed order to have the company list all of the similar repairs on their pipes and to improve its leak detection systems. The agency submitted this proposed order on March 29, with the company having 30 days to respond and 90 days after it takes effect to submit a plan to the agency on how they would evaluate the effectiveness of their existing leak detection systems.

In June, the company filed an agreement with PHMSA wherein they would avoid penalties or litigation in exchange for inspecting and improving their leak detection systems and their maintenance protocols. The company would have until October to submit a work plan and timeline, and they would also have to submit quarterly reports to the agency. Failure on the part of the company to meet these requirements could result in fees of $200,000 per day.

=== Late 2021 ===
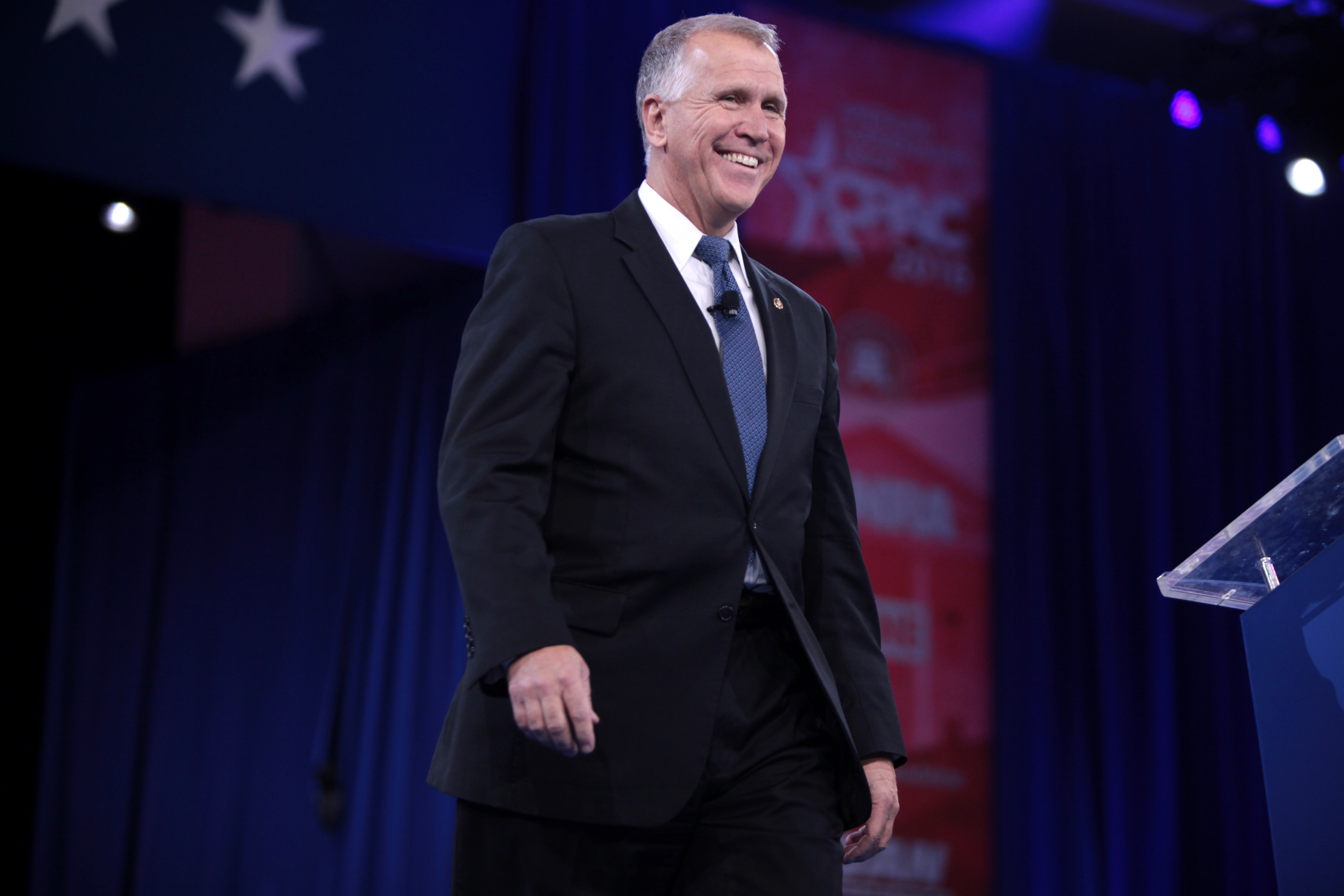
Activists protested outside the Huntersville residence of Senator Thom Tillis (pictured 2016) on July 25 in response to the spill.

On July 25, several dozen climate activists from the Sunrise Movement held a rally at Veterans Park in Huntersville to raise awareness of the spill and push for elected officials to promote more eco-friendly infrastructure. Following the demonstration, some protestors moved the protest to outside of the Huntersville residence of Senator Thom Tillis, with further protesting lasting into the following morning. Three protestors involved in the later activity were charged by police with trespassing. In a later message to The Charlotte Observer, a spokesperson for Tillis stated that "members of Congress have no jurisdictional regulatory authority over what is a local and state regulatory issue".

By July 31, the company announced that it had recovered 1,225,000 U.S. gal (4,640,000 L), with further cleanup efforts removing an additional 1,000 gallons per day. While this new total surpassed the company's previously stated estimate of 1.2 million, they did not offer an updated estimate at that time. By this point, the company had removed roughly 8,700 short tons (7,900 t) of contaminated dirt and had completely covered the immediate area of the pipeline with fill dirt, and they were working with the local department of parks and recreation on replanting native vegetation in the area. Additionally, the company had dug 281 wells for monitoring and recovering gasoline over a 12-acre (4.9 ha) area. However, the company was ordered by the NCDEQ to construct additional deeper wells to more accurately gauge how far beneath the surface the gasoline had reached. By the one-year anniversary of the spill's discovery, the company had spent over $30 million on the cleanup efforts, which included the cost of connecting four nearby houses to municipal water services and outright buying another three houses, which the company used to house workers. By August 23, the official estimate from the company rose to 1,250,000 U.S. gal (4,700,000 L).

On November 2, the NCDEQ filed a lawsuit against Colonial in the Mecklenburg County Superior Court, alleging that the company had broken state law by failing to update the department regarding the scope of the spill. In addition to more information and an updated estimate, the department also wanted the company to submit a corrective action plan, a "comprehensive conceptual model" of the spill, and further information on the pipeline's leak detection system in the state. Furthermore, the department wanted the company to perform monthly testing of nearby surface water for not only gasoline, but also for pH, lead, volatile organic compounds, and per- and polyfluoroalkyl substances (PFAS). The state would also have to be notified of the location of all Type A sleeves present on the line in North Carolina and whether they needed replacement or not, as the company had by this time identified corrosion issues with the sleeve type as the cause of the spill. In a response issued the following month, the company stated that the lawsuit "lacks factual and legal basis" and that, while the company had supplied the department with some of the requested information, other data was "not feasible to provide". By the end of 2021, the company had recovered approximately 1,400,000 U.S. gal (5,300,000 L) and was still averaging an additional 1,000 gallons per day.

=== 2022 ===
In late June 2022, the company and department agreed to a consent decree wherein Colonial would provide additional information to the NCDEQ and also pay nearly $5 million in penalties. This amount included $4.5 million in a civil penalty and an additional $250,000 for costs of the investigation, with additional penalties if the company failed to meet the terms of the decree. By statute, the $4.5 million would go towards the state's education fund. Per the terms of the agreement, the company would have to submit a corrective action plan and schedule, install additional testing wells to see if gasoline had reached bedrock, perform monthly testing and submit a report on the water surface quality, and perform quarterly testing for PFAS. Commenting on the agreement, Environmental Quality Secretary Elizabeth Biser said, "The Consent Order requires Colonial to meet its obligations to the communities impacted by the release, starting with an accurate accounting of the spill volume. This release is on track to be the largest onshore spill in our nation's history and the order holds Colonial accountable for the necessary cleanup to restore the environment". The settlement was approved by Judge Kimberly Best on July 7.

By the end of June, the company had an updated estimate for the spill of about 1,470,000 U.S. gal (5,600,000 L) of gasoline, and by July 13, they were reporting that about 1.4 million gallons, in addition to 10,000,000 U.S. gal (38,000,000 L) of contaminated water, had been collected. However, on July 22, as per the terms of the consent decree, the company put out a statement saying that they now estimated that at least 2,000,000 U.S. gal (7,600,000 L) had leaked, prompting regulators in the state to call the spill the largest gasoline spill on land in the history of the United States. According to the company, the pipeline had failed on July 27, 2020, meaning that gasoline had been leaking from the spot for at least 18 days prior to its discovery. The company also stated that they had installed over 385 wells in the area to help remove the gasoline and had identified all areas along their mainline that were found to have used a Type A sleeve and had replaced them with Type B sleeves. The cost of these repairs and replacements was $50 million, while the company had also spent $55 million to this point on the cleanup in Mecklenburg County. They stated that at that time, 1,490,000 U.S. gal (5,600,000 L) had been recovered. According to a July 25 article in EnergyWire, the cleanup is expected to last for several more years.

== Aftermath ==
As the estimates for the amount of gasoline continued to increase over the course of the cleanup, multiple publications made note of the historic size of the spill. In February 2021, after the company gave an estimate of 1.2 million gallons, EnergyWire reported that the spill now constituted "one of the biggest gasoline spills to occur in the United States" as well as "the largest gasoline spill from a pipeline outside of a tank farm storage facility". By July 2022, with the estimate now around 2 million gallons, that same publication called the incident "the largest U.S. gasoline pipeline spill on record". Additionally, local television news broadcasters called it "the largest onshore fuel spill in the nation". The spill occurred during a period of increased scrutiny on the safety of oil pipelines in the United States, highlighted by the construction of the Dakota Access Pipeline and concerns expressed regarding its safety.

In March 2021, the two teenagers who initially identified the spill were awarded keys to the city by the mayor of Huntersville.

== See also ==
- Colonial Pipeline ransomware attack
- List of pipeline accidents in the United States in 2020
