= List of pipeline accidents in the United States in the 2020s =

The following is a list of pipeline accidents in the United States in the 2020s. It is one of several lists of U.S. pipeline accidents. See also list of natural gas and oil production accidents in the United States.

== Incidents ==
This is not a complete list of all pipeline accidents. For natural gas alone, the Pipeline and Hazardous Materials Safety Administration (PHMSA), a United States Department of Transportation agency, has collected data on more than 3,200 accidents deemed serious or significant since 1987.

A "significant incident" results in any of the following consequences:

- fatality or injury requiring in-patient hospitalization
- $50,000 or more in total costs, measured in 1984 dollars
- liquid releases of five or more barrels (42 US gal/barrel)
- releases resulting in an unintentional fire or explosion

PHMSA and the National Transportation Safety Board (NTSB) post incident data, and results of investigations, into accidents involving pipelines that carry a variety of products, including natural gas, oil, diesel fuel, gasoline, kerosene, jet fuel, carbon dioxide, and other substances. Occasionally pipelines are repurposed to carry different products.

=== 2020 ===
- February 22 – A pipeline carrying carbon dioxide and hydrogen sulfide, owned by Denbury Resources, exploded in Satartia, Mississippi, causing cars to stop and people to go unconscious; 45 were hospitalized.
- May 4 – A gas transmission pipeline exploded and burned in Fleming County, Kentucky. There were no injuries.
- May 5 – A leak occurred in a relief line, at a Keystone Pipeline Terminal in Beaumont, Texas. About 18,500 gallons of crude oil were spilled. The cause seemed to be internal corrosion.
- July 28 – A gas line explosion and fire occurred in Martin County, Texas, which injured four workers. A ditching truck hit an existing high-pressure gas line, causing an explosion and fire.
- July 29 – A contractor ruptured a gas pipeline in Mont Belvieu, Texas, causing an explosion and fire. There were no injuries.
- August 14 – 2020 Colonial Pipeline oil spill: A Colonial Pipeline mainline, a 40-inch pipeline, was discovered to be leaking in the Oehler Nature Preserve near Huntersville, North Carolina. Approximately 2 million gallons of gasoline were spilled. The leak was near a previously repaired area.
- August 18 – An El Paso Natural Gas transmission pipeline exploded and burned near Midland, Texas. There were no injuries.
- August 21 – A dredging vessel hit a submerged Enterprise Products propane pipeline in the harbor of Corpus Christi, Texas, causing an explosion and fire. Five of the crew were killed, and six others were injured.
- September 10 – Florida Gas Transmission's 12-inch Sanford Lateral gas pipeline ruptured and subsequently ignited in Sanford, Florida. The size of the burn area around the rupture site was determined to be 515 feet by 100 feet. 20 nearby homes were evacuated, but there were no injuries reported.
- September 16 – The DCP Midstream Kingfisher 12-inch gas pipeline exploded and burned, in Piedmont, Oklahoma. There were no injuries reported.
- September 24
  - Florida Gas Transmission's FLMEA-21 18-inch pipeline ruptured and ejected multiple pieces of pipeline into the air in Lake Worth, Florida. There was no fire and no injuries, but the outside lane of northbound traffic on the Florida Turnpike was closed while FGT assessed the damage and initiated repairs. An unknown number of people were evacuated from commercial businesses and a nearby elementary school.
  - Natural Gas Pipeline Company of America's 20-inch Indian Basin Pipeline ruptured and released approximately 31,757 MCF (31,757,000 cubic feet) of natural gas in Eddy County, New Mexico. There was no fire or injuries.
- December 24 – A gas transmission pipeline exploded and burned, in Lyons, Nebraska. There were no injuries. Scores and gouges on the pipe suggested earlier damage caused the failure.

=== 2021 ===
- February 16 – A gas pipeline exploded and burned near Monument, New Mexico. There were no injuries.
- March 5 – CenterPoint Energy employees were excavating a gas pipeline in Harris County, Texas when the line ruptured, causing a gas explosion and fire. 7 employees were injured.
- March 16 – Buckeye Partner's 12-inch hazardous liquid pipeline Line 602 ruptured and released approximately 14,800 gallons of unleaded gasoline in Linden, New Jersey. Gasoline entered a swamp near the Arthur Kill River.
- June 26 – At approximately 7:25 pm EDT, TGP's 24-inch Tennessee Gas Pipeline ruptured and reportedly released approximately 11,000 MCF of natural gas in West Bloomfield, New York. There was no fire or injuries.
- June 28 – During a pipeline pig run, two people were killed and two were injured at Atmos Energy in Collin County, Texas. An investigation found that a leak on a mainline valve and improper procedures caused the accident.
- July 22 – A natural gas transmission pipeline exploded & burned in Ellsworth County, Kansas. There were no injuries reported.
- August 15 – An El Paso Natural Gas gas transmission pipeline exploded and burned in Coolidge, Arizona. 2 people were killed and another was seriously burned.
- October 23 – A bulldozer operator hit a gas line, at a shopping center under construction in Brenham, Texas. This resulted in a fire engulfing the bulldozer. The bulldozer operator was airlifted to a hospital with burns.
- December 27 – A leak was detected on a 16-inch pipeline, in St. Bernard Parish, Louisiana. About 350,000 gallons of low sulfur diesel were spilled. That section of pipe had corrosion thinning, and the leak detection system for the pipeline did not fully indicate a leak.

=== 2022 ===
- February 22
  - A Southern Natural Gas 18-inch pipeline exploded and burned, in Perry County, Alabama. A 5-foot-long section of pipe was ejected 72 feet away. There were no injuries.
  - Residents in Lawrenceville, Georgia reported to a local gas company a gas smell. This led to finding diesel fuel running into a storm drain from a leaking Products Pipe Line 26-inch line. It was unknown how long the pipeline had been leaking.
- March 11 – Woodpat Pipeline, a 22-inch-diameter hazardous liquids pipeline operated by Marathon Pipe Line LLC (Marathon Petroleum), ruptured in Edwardsville, Illinois. The rupture resulted in the release of about 164,000 gallons of crude oil, some of which entered Cahokia Creek, a tributary of the Mississippi River. No injuries occurred, and the crude oil did not ignite.
- June 29 – Energy Transfer Partners Mid Valley Pipeline ruptured, when a secondary party damaged the transmission pipeline carrying crude oil, in Henderson, Tennessee. The damage resulted in the discharge of approximately 4,800 barrels of crude, equivalent to 201,600 gallons into the surrounding area, including a local creek.
- July 27 – A leak was discovered in a diesel fuel pipeline, near Sussex, Wyoming. About 450,000 gallons of diesel were spilled.
- September 20 – A contractor's digging equipment hit & ruptured a crude oil gathering pipeline in Williams County, North Dakota, spilling about 8,400 gallons of crude oil.
- December 7 – The Keystone Pipeline leaked about 588,000 gallons of heavy crude oil into a creek, in Washington County, Kansas. This is the biggest oil spill in Keystone Pipeline history.
- December 23 – Energy Transfer Partners experienced a failure, at their Cygnet, Ohio Pump Station, that resulted in the release of approximately 83,000 gallons of crude oil, a portion which migrated off property controlled by Energy Transfer. The cause appeared to be hydrogen stress cracking in a weld.

=== 2023 ===
- January 4 – Colonial Pipeline's Line 3 leaked about 2,500 gallons of petroleum products, near Danville, Virginia. The cause was not immediately known.
- March 24 – A gas explosion leveled building number 2 at R.M. Palmer's West Reading, Pennsylvania chocolate factory. 7 workers were killed, and, 10 others were injured. 35 minutes before the explosion, Palmer employees reported smelling gas to their supervisors. Investigators determined that the gas came from a leak in a nearby underground plastic pipeline.
- March 29 – A crude oil pipeline controller switched receiving tanks at a crude station without reducing pressure, causing a high pressure condition on a connected pipeline in Midland County, Texas. A valve on the pipeline shut off, causing a filter pot to break. Leak sensing alarms went off, but the pipeline controller continued to pump crude through the broken filter for about 2 1/2 hours. About 402,000 gallons of crude were spilled at the leak.
- July 5 – An Energy Transfer Partners crude oil pipeline experienced a failure near Cygnet, Ohio, resulting in the initial reported release of approximately 1,000 barrels of crude oil. The cause was not immediately determined.
- July 25 – A Columbia Gas Transmission 26-inch natural gas pipeline burst and ignited, in Strasburg, Virginia. There were no injuries reported.
- August 6 – A 12-inch crude oil pipeline, approximately 14 miles south of Grandfalls, Texas. About 8,400 gallons of crude were spilled.
- October 4 – An Enable Gas Transmission (a subsidiary of Energy Transfer Partners) 24-inch gas pipeline exploded and burned, in Jessieville, Arkansas. There were no injuries, and the cause seemed to be external corrosion.

=== 2024 ===
- January 30 – A natural gas pipeline burst and burned in western Oklahoma near 9:15 P.M. Multiple firefighters attempted to extinguish the blaze.
- February 3 – A Tennessee Gas Pipeline natural gas pipeline failed in near Sardis, a town in Panola County, Mississippi. A failed wrinkle bend is suspected to be the cause of the release. The failure occurred on the same line and in the same general area as a November 21, 2011 failure that also stemmed from a wrinkle bend failure. There were no injuries or fire.
- August 20 – A pipeline worker was killed in a gas pipeline explosion and fire, near Venice, Louisiana.
- September 3 – A gas pipeline in East Fishkill, New York ruptured and burned. Overhead power lines were damaged. There were no injuries.
- September 11 – An explosion and flash fire at a gas pipeline terminal, in Maysville, Oklahoma, burned 3 pipeline workers.
- September 16 – A vehicle drove into an Energy Transfer 20-inch pipeline carrying natural gas liquids exploded in Deer Park, Texas at 9:55 AM, sending flames hundreds of feet into the air and causing a fire that spread to La Porte, Texas. Roads around the fire were closed and nearby San Jacinto College went under a shelter-in-place. Over 700 customers were without power as the fire damaged power lines and power poles. Evacuations were ordered for the Brookglen neighborhood. The driver of the vehicle died.
- November 6 – A natural gas-fueled explosion fatally injured one person and destroyed a home in South Jordan, Utah. Enbridge found a leak about 150 feet northeast of the home on a 4-inch-diameter Aldyl plastic pipe, a natural gas main it owned and operated.
- November 11 – Enbridge Line 6 was found to be leaking crude oil, in Jefferson County, Wisconsin. About 70,000 gallons of crude oil were leaked.

=== 2025 ===
- January 31 – a 14-inch Sunoco pipeline was found to be leaking jet fuel, in Upper Makefield, Pennsylvania. It was suspected that the pipeline had been leaking a at a slow rate for a number of previous months. 6 nearby water wells were contaminated, and it was estimated that the pipeline had leaked about 6,550 gallons of fuel. The leak point was at a previous patched area of the pipeline.
- April 8 – An employee of Keystone Pipeline heard a “mechanical bang” from that pipeline, while working near Fort Ransom, North Dakota. The pipeline had failed, spilling about 147,000 gallons of tar sands crude.
- April 9
  - Construction work ruptured a gas transmission pipeline, in Allegan County, Michigan, interrupting natural gas service to 5,200 customers in the area. There was no fire.
  - Fiber optic cable installers hit a gas main, in Lexington, Missouri. The escaping gas entered one home, causing a gas explosion and fire that killed a child, injured 2 others, and caused extensive damage to a number of homes.
- July 31 – A Kinder Morgan owned gas pipeline, Colorado Interstate Gas Pipeline, had an explosion & fire, at a gas metering station in Fremont County, Wyoming. One worker was injured. The cause was incorrect system operation.
- September 21 – A natural gas pipeline ruptured and burst into flames, near Cheyenne, Wyoming, charring a freight train and lighting up the night sky with a glow seen more than 60 miles (nearly 100 kilometers) to the south in Colorado, officials said. There were no injuries.

=== 2026 ===
- February 3 – a 42 inch diameter gas pipeline failed during pigging operations, in Cameron Parish, Louisiana. The escaping gas dug a crater, then ignited, injuring a pipeline worker at the site.
- February 14 – A LPG pipeline failed, near Brighton, Iowa causing a large fire. There were no injuries, and, external corrosion was suspected as the cause.
- May 5 – A ONEOK pipeline spilled about 210,000 gallons of crude oil, near Rosebud, Texas. There were no injuries reported.
- August 26 - An unoccupied semi-truck rolled into an Enbridge's Line 5 pipeline, at a pipeline construction site, near Saxon, Wisconsin. Natural gas liquids (Natural-gas condensate) were released, forcing evacuations. More than 1.3 million gallons of NGL's were released.
