= Benny Lichtenwalner =

American entrepreneur and relationship coach

Benjamin "Benny" Lichtenwalner (born c. 1981) is an American entrepreneur and relationship coach. A United States Marine Corps veteran, he co-founded Biotrauma, a Georgia crime- and trauma-scene cleanup company, in 2006. Since the late 2010s he has worked as a breakup coach under the name "Coach Benny".

Lichtenwalner served in the United States Marine Corps as a mortuary affairs specialist, and was among the first Marines trained and deployed in that role. He was part of the first Marine mortuary unit sent into combat and, as a sergeant, handled the remains of hundreds of war victims in Iraq. His service included duty in Ramadi, where his unit recovered and processed the remains of fallen service members.

In January 2006, Lichtenwalner and fellow Marine veteran Ryan Sawyer founded Biotrauma, Inc., a crime- and trauma-scene cleanup company based in Gainesville, Georgia, applying the skills of their military mortuary work to civilian death scenes. According to Fortune Small Business, the company grew from roughly $90,000 in revenue in its first year to $498,000 in 2008. The company received national press attention in 2009, in part following interest in crime-scene cleanup generated by the film Sunshine Cleaning. Lichtenwalner told Fortune Small Business the work was a duty to help families "attain closure".

By the early 2020s, Lichtenwalner had become a relationship coach specializing in breakups, operating as "Coach Benny". In 2024 he had more than 280,000 TikTok followers, offered one-on-one video coaching sessions and a tier of direct phone access, and said of his path into the work: "I walked the path of a lot of this stuff, and I realized I could help other people."
