= Flat Creek (Bourbeuse River tributary) =

Stream in the U.S. state of Missouri

Coordinates: 38.4458851°N 90.9926422°W

Flat Creek is a stream in Franklin County in the U.S. state of Missouri. It is a tributary of the Bourbeuse River.

Flat Creek is characterized by flat rocks in its bottom, hence the name.

== See also ==
- List of rivers of Missouri
