= Flat Creek (Little Black River tributary) =

Stream in Ripley County, Missouri

Coordinates: 36°42′50″N 90°43′21″W

Flat Creek is a stream in Ripley County in the U.S. state of Missouri. It is a tributary of the Little Black River.

Flat Creek was so named for the fact the surrounding land is flat.

== See also ==
- List of rivers of Missouri
