= Flat Creek Township, Pettis County, Missouri =

Inactive township in the American state of Missouri

Coordinates: 38.6056°N 93.2267°W

Flat Creek Township is an inactive township in Pettis County, in the U.S. state of Missouri.

Flat Creek Township was erected in 1846, taking its name from Flat Creek.
