= Mar-Jac Poultry =

Coordinates: 34.2795°N 83.8290°W

Mar-Jac Poultry, Inc.
- Type: Private
- Industry: Poultry
- Founded: 1954
- Founders: Marvin and Jack McKibbon
- Headquarters: Gainesville, Georgia, United States
- Products: Poultry, processed chicken
- Production output: ~2 million birds per week (as of 2023)
- Parent: Mar-Jac Holdings, Inc.

Mar-Jac Poultry, Inc. is an American poultry production company that operates facilities in Alabama, Georgia, and Mississippi. As of 2023, it produces two million birds and 8,500 tons of feed per week.

== Overview ==
Headquartered in Gainesville, Georgia, Mar-Jac Poultry is an integrated poultry production company that operates processing plants, feed mills and hatcheries in Alabama, Georgia, and Mississippi. Its poultry products are shipped worldwide, primarily serving the food service industry. As of 2024, it is the largest employer in Walker County, Alabama.

== History ==
Mar-Jac Poultry was founded in 1954 by brothers Marvin and Jack McKibbon. It began as a small processing plant serving a cooperative of poultry growers in Northeast Georgia. During the 1980s and 1990s, the company underwent several ownership changes before being consolidated under Mar-Jac Holdings, Inc. in 1996.

In 2014, Mar-Jac Poultry acquired assets from Marshall Durbin, including a processing plant, hatchery, feed mill, and distribution center in Jasper, Alabama.

In 2015, the company announced a $50 million expansion, including a feed mill, processing plant upgrades, and additional poultry houses in Northwest Alabama.

In 2019, Mar-Jac Poultry was recognized with the "Industry of the Year" award at the Franklin County Partnership Awards Banquet.

In 2024, Mar-Jac Poultry announced a $25 million transload facility in Perry County, Mississippi, to improve feed ingredient transportation.

In 2025, Mar-Jac Poultry was fined for $385,000 by the US Department of Labor after a child labor investigation uncovered that children were being employed at their facility in Jasper, Alabama. In this investigation it was also found out that children aged 14 to 15 year old were performing hazardous tasks such as operating forklifts, working on the facility's kill floor, and working outside legally allowed hours.
