= Flat Creek (Meramec River tributary) =

Stream in St. Louis County, Missouri, U.S.

Coordinates: 38.5217203°N 90.6251263°W

Flat Creek is a stream in St. Louis County in the U.S. state of Missouri. It is a tributary of the Meramec River.

Flat Creek was so named on account of the flat terrain along its course.

== See also ==
- List of rivers of Missouri
