= Banks & Shane =

Banks and Shane (Banks Burgess and Paul Shane) is a folk and Americana-influenced music group based in Atlanta, Georgia. Banks and Shane started performing in the Atlanta area in August 1972 and have entertained with performances around the U.S. and the world on concert stages, at nightclubs, ski resorts, and other venues. With Banks on vocals, banjo, and guitar, and with Shane on vocals, guitar, and trombone, their harmonies and arrangements are complemented by experienced and versatile Atlanta-area musicians.

Banks & Shane have recorded 12 albums since 1972. They owned and operated two Atlanta restaurant/supper clubs (Banks & Shane's in Sandy Springs and in Underground Atlanta from 1983 to 1992), and have traveled to Munich, Frankfurt, Amsterdam, and London representing the Atlanta Convention & Visitor's Bureau, Delta Air Lines, and The Georgia Hospitality and Travel Association. Throughout their career, Banks & Shane have donated time and talent to dozens of charities and have been cited by both the Governor of Georgia and the Secretary of State of Georgia for their many contributions.

Former band members have included Chuck Shane, Paul's brother, on the drums and bass guitar (1974–2002); Dr. Rick Waters, fiddle, mandolin, and bass guitar (1975–76); Professor Benny Goss, piano and keyboards (1977–1984); Steve Hawes, Bass (1982–1999); David Irwin, electric guitar, fiddle, mandolin and pedal steel guitar (1985–1999), Randy Feagin, drums, Tim Price, lead guitar, Benny Boynton, keyboards and keyboard bass. The current band members include Chuck Shane returning on bass, Jim Durand, electric & acoustic guitars and Dennis Law on drums. Other local musician friends and previous band members fill out the group from time to time.

On August 18, 2006, comedian Jeff Foxworthy and Banks & Shane embraced their southern roots for two charitable causes when they presented “Jeff Foxworthy with Banks & Shane for Children's Healthcare of Atlanta and Camp Sunshine” at Presentation Point Amphitheater at Lake Lanier Islands near Gainesville, Georgia.

On Sunday, December 14, 2008, Banks & Shane performed "A Very Special Christmas Concert" at the then-new Cobb Energy Performing Arts Centre in Marietta, Georgia and were joined by 55 selected 5th graders from the Cobb County Schools. All ticket proceeds from the concert were donated, in the names of the participating children, to Children's Healthcare of Atlanta.

In addition to their regular act, Banks & Shane, with Chuck Shane on bass, have been joined by long-time friend, Jim Durand, creating a folk tribute to the "Trio" that started it all back in the late 1950s. So far, they have performed to sold-out audiences from Arkansas to the Carolinas, to Florida, in Georgia and many spots in between. Additional tribute shows are planned for the future; a perfect alternative for fans with a smaller budget, but an enduring love for the music and fun-loving spirit of the original "Trio".

On August 18, 2012, Banks & Shane celebrated 40 years of musical fun with a concert at Peachtree Point Amphitheater in Lake Lanier Islands. On January 12, 2013 at The Fox Theater in Atlanta, Georgia, Banks & Shane provided the music for radio talk show host Neal Boortz's "Happy Ending" retirement party.

Banks and Shane are still entertaining crowds in the Atlanta area as they approach their 50th anniversary in 2022!

- Banks and Shane's website
