= Gainesville, Georgia =

- City
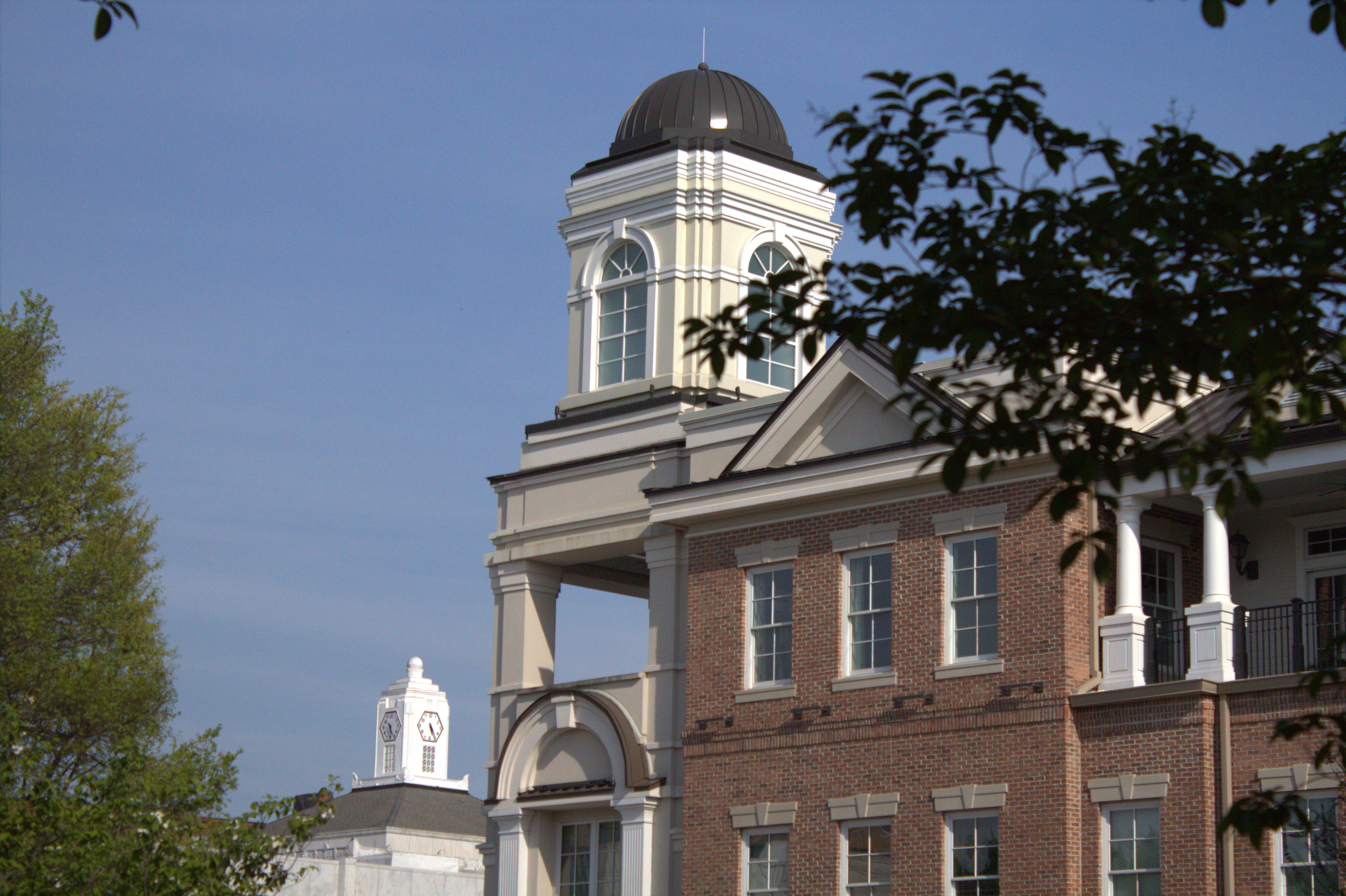
- Downtown Gainesville

- Logo
- Nicknames: "Queen City of the Mountains", "Poultry Capital of the World"
- Location in Hall County and the state of Georgia
- Coordinates: 34°17′25″N 83°49′46″W
- Country: United States
- State: Georgia
- County: Hall
- Gainesville: 1818; 208 years ago
- Named for: Edmund P. Gaines

Government
  - Mayor: Zack Thompson

Area
  - City: 35.37 sq mi (91.61 km^{2})
  - Land: 33.42 sq mi (86.57 km^{2})
  - Water: 1.95 sq mi (5.04 km^{2})
- Elevation: 1,214 ft (370 m)

Population (2020)
  - City: 42,296
  - Density: 1,265.4/sq mi (488.57/km^{2})
  - Urban: 164,365 (US: 219th)
  - Urban density: 1,102.1/sq mi (425.5/km^{2})
  - Metro: 203,136 (US: 217th)
- Time zone: UTC-5 (EST)
  - Summer (DST): UTC-4 (EDT)
- ZIP Code: 30501, 30503-30504, 30506-30507
- Area code: 770
- FIPS code: 13-31908
- GNIS feature ID: 2403675
- Website: gainesville.org

Gainesville is a city in and the county seat of Hall County, Georgia, United States. As of the 2020 census, the city had a population of 42,296. This city is part of Metro Atlanta.

== History ==
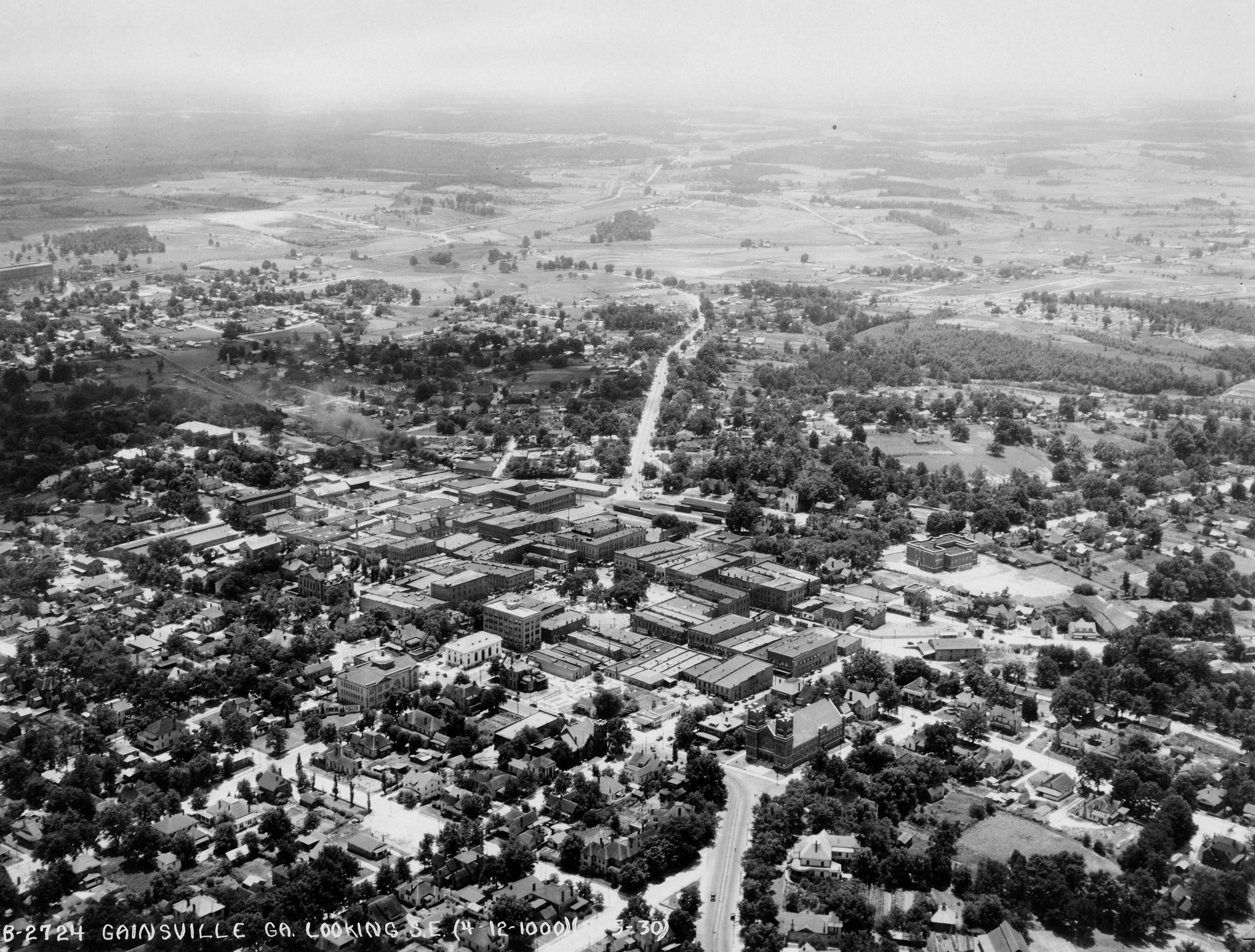
View of Gainesville, 1931

Gainesville was established as "Mule Camp Springs" by European-American settlers in the early 1800s. Less than three years after the organization of Hall County on December 15, 1818, Mule Camp Springs was renamed "Gainesville" on April 21, 1821. It was named in honor of General Edmund P. Gaines, a hero of the War of 1812 and a noted military surveyor and road-builder. Gainesville was selected to be the county seat and chartered by the Georgia General Assembly on November 30, 1821.

A gold rush that began in nearby Lumpkin County in the 1830s resulted in an increase in the number of settlers and the beginning of a business community. In the middle of the 19th century, Gainesville had two important events. In 1849, it became established as a resort center, with people attracted to the springs. In 1851, much of the small city was destroyed by fire.

Around 1870, after the Civil War, Gainesville began to grow. In 1871, the Atlanta and Richmond Air-Line Railway, later re-organized into The Atlanta and Charlotte Air Line Railroad, began to stop in Gainesville, increasing its ties to other markets and stimulating business and population. It grew from 1,000 in 1870 to over 5,000 by 1900.

By 1898, textile mills had become the primary driver of the economy, with the railroad integral to delivering raw cotton and carrying away the mills' products. With the revenues generated by the mills, in 1902, Gainesville became the first city south of Baltimore to install street lamps. On March 1, 1905, free mail delivery began in Gainesville, and on August 10, 1910, the Gainesville post office was opened. On December 22, 1915, the city's first high-rise, the Jackson Building, had its formal opening. In 1919, Southern Bell made improvements to the phone system.

City services began in Gainesville on February 22, 1873, with the election of a City Marshal, followed by solid waste collection in 1874. In 1890, a bond issue to fund the waterworks was passed, and the original water distribution system was developed.

In 1943, at the height of World War II, Gainesville contributed to the war effort by leasing the airport to the US government for $1.00. The military used it as a naval air station for training purposes. In 1947, the airport was returned to the city of Gainesville, improved by the addition of two 4,000-foot (1,200 m) landing strips (one of which was later lengthened to 5,500 feet (1,700 m)).

After World War II, a businessman named Jesse Jewell started the poultry industry in north Georgia. Chickens have since become the state's largest agricultural crop.

In 1956, the U.S. Army Corps of Engineers constructed Lake Sidney Lanier by building Buford Dam on the Chattahoochee River. During the 1996 Summer Olympics, Gainesville was the venue for the rowing and kayaking medal competitions, which were staged on Lake Lanier.

On January 28, 2021, a poultry plant in Gainesville leaked liquid nitrogen killing 6 and hospitalizing 12.

== Geography ==
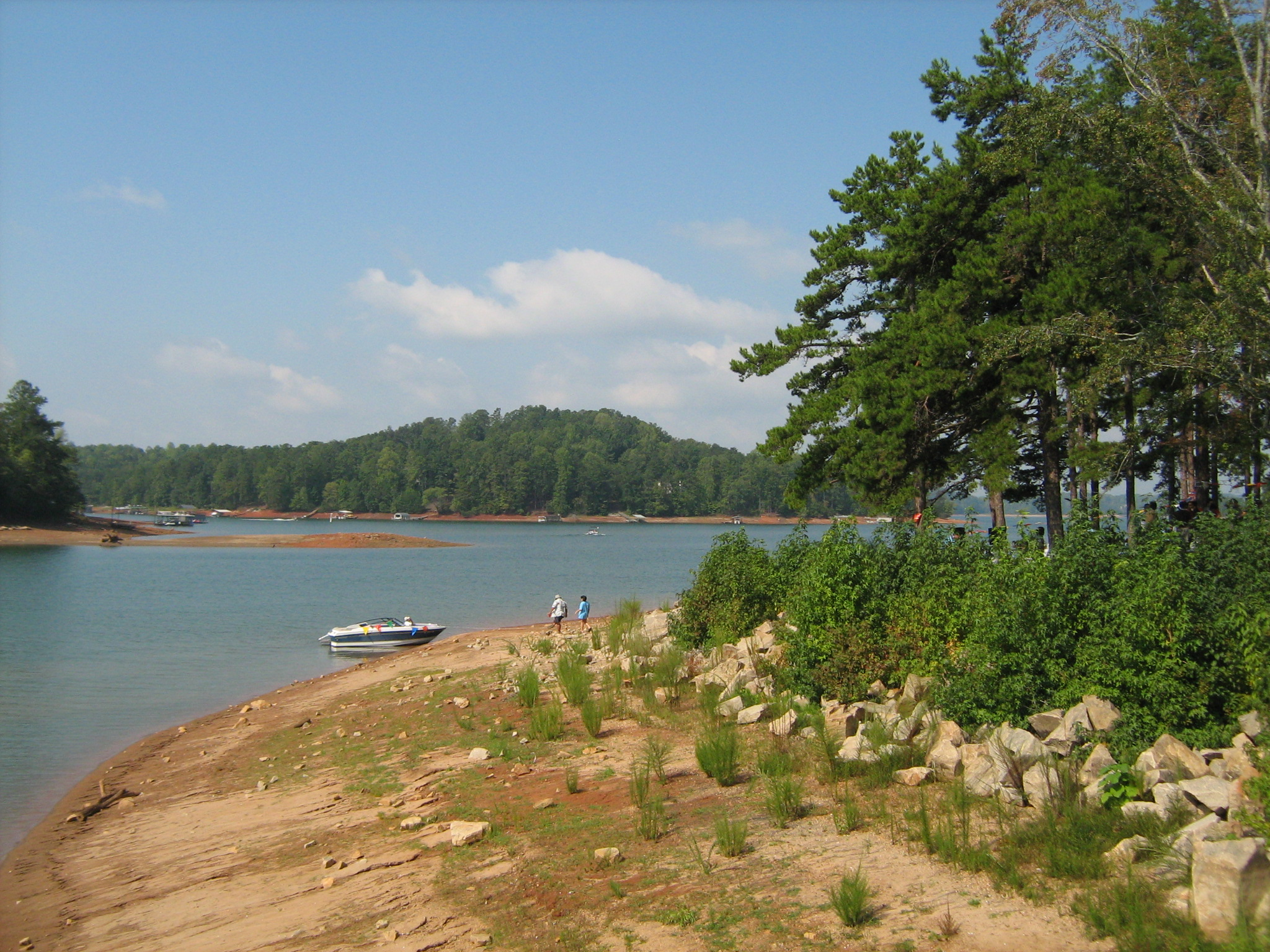
Lake Lanier at River Forks Park

Gainesville is located in central Hall County at 34°18′16″N 83°50′2″W (34.304490, -83.833897). It is bordered to the southwest by the city of Oakwood. Interstate 985/U.S. Route 23 passes through the southern part of the city, leading southwest 54 miles (87 km) to Atlanta and northeast 23 miles (37 km) to Baldwin and Cornelia. U.S. Route 129 runs through the east side of the city, leading north 24 miles (39 km) to Cleveland and southeast 21 miles (34 km) to Jefferson.

According to the United States Census Bureau, the city has a total area of 33.9 square miles (87.7 km^{2}), of which 31.9 square miles (82.7 km^{2}) are land and 1.9 square miles (5.0 km^{2}), or 5.75%, are water.

Nestled in the foothills of the Blue Ridge Mountains, parts of Gainesville lie along the shore of one of the nation's most popular inland water destinations, Lake Lanier. Named after Confederate veteran, Georgia author and musician Sidney Lanier, the lake was created in 1956 when the U.S. Army Corps of Engineers dammed the Chattahoochee River near Buford and flooded the river's valley. Although created primarily for hydroelectricity and flood control, it also serves as a reservoir providing water to the city of Atlanta and is a very popular recreational attraction for all of north Georgia.

Much of Gainesville is heavily wooded, with both deciduous and coniferous trees.

=== Climate ===
Much like the rest of northern Georgia, Gainesville has a humid subtropical climate (Köppen climate classification Cfa), with cool to mild winters and hot, humid summers.

Climate data for Gainesville, Georgia (1991-2020 normals, extremes 1891–present)
Month	Jan	Feb	Mar	Apr	May	Jun	Jul	Aug	Sep	Oct	Nov	Dec	Year
Record high °F (°C)	79 (26)	79 (26)	88 (31)	93 (34)	98 (37)	107 (42)	107 (42)	104 (40)	105 (41)	96 (36)	86 (30)	78 (26)	107 (42)
Mean daily maximum °F (°C)	51.1 (10.6)	54.9 (12.7)	63.0 (17.2)	71.3 (21.8)	78.0 (25.6)	84.6 (29.2)	87.8 (31.0)	86.4 (30.2)	81.1 (27.3)	71.9 (22.2)	62.0 (16.7)	53.8 (12.1)	70.5 (21.4)
Mean daily minimum °F (°C)	31.1 (−0.5)	33.5 (0.8)	39.7 (4.3)	47.1 (8.4)	56.0 (13.3)	64.0 (17.8)	67.8 (19.9)	66.9 (19.4)	60.9 (16.1)	49.9 (9.9)	39.6 (4.2)	34.3 (1.3)	49.2 (9.6)
Record low °F (°C)	−8 (−22)	−6 (−21)	7 (−14)	22 (−6)	33 (1)	41 (5)	49 (9)	49 (9)	34 (1)	20 (−7)	4 (−16)	−1 (−18)	−8 (−22)
Average rainfall inches (mm)	5.28 (134)	5.15 (131)	5.31 (135)	4.19 (106)	4.23 (107)	4.51 (115)	3.90 (99)	5.11 (130)	4.13 (105)	4.20 (107)	4.39 (112)	5.16 (131)	55.56 (1,412)
Average snowfall inches (cm)	0.7 (1.8)	0.5 (1.3)	0.1 (0.25)	0 (0)	0 (0)	0 (0)	0 (0)	0 (0)	0 (0)	0 (0)	0 (0)	0.3 (0.76)	1.6 (4.11)
Source: NOAA

==== Severe weather ====
While Gainesville does not sit in Tornado Alley, a region of the United States where severe weather is common, supercell thunderstorms can sweep through at any time between March and November, being primarily concentrated in the spring. Tornado watches are frequent in the spring and summer, with a warning appearing at least biannually, occasionally with more than one per year.

Tornado activity in the Gainesville area is above the Georgia state average and is 108% greater than the overall U.S. average. Gainesville was the site of a deadly F4 on June 1, 1903, which killed 98 people. Gainesville was the site of the fifth deadliest tornado in U.S. history in 1936, in which Gainesville was devastated and 203 people were killed. In April 1974, an F4 tornado 22.6 miles away from the Gainesville city center killed six people and injured thirty. In December 1973, an F3 tornado 2.1 miles away from the city center injured twenty-one people. Both storms caused between $500,000 and $5,000,000 in property damage. On March 20, 1998, an F3 tornado impacted the Gainesville metro area early in the morning, killing 12 people and injuring 171 others. Another F3 tornado later that day killed 2 other people and injured a further 27 people in the Stoneville area.

== Transportation ==
=== Major roads ===
- Interstate 985
- State Route 347
- U.S. Route 23
- U.S. Route 129
- U.S. Route 129 Business
- State Route 11
- State Route 11 Business
- State Route 13
- State Route 53
- State Route 53 Connector
- State Route 60
- State Route 60 Connector
- State Route 284
- State Route 365
- State Route 365 Business
- State Route 369

=== Pedestrians and cycling ===
- Highlands to Island Trail (Under construction)
- Midtown Greenway
- Wilshire Trails

=== Mass transit ===
- The Gainesville Amtrak station is situated at 116 Industrial Boulevard. Amtrak's Crescent train connects Gainesville with the cities of New York, Philadelphia, Baltimore, Washington, Greensboro, Charlotte, Atlanta, Birmingham and New Orleans. The southbound train arrives on Saturday, Monday, and Wednesday mornings, and the northbound train on Sunday, Tuesday, and Thursday evenings.
- Gainesville connection was replaced by WeGo in 2021.

=== Airport ===
- Lee Gilmer Memorial Airport (GVL), built in 1940, is a city-owned airport with two runways (5,500 ft and 4,001 ft), and supports air taxi operations, itinerant operations, local operations, and military operations. Aircraft include 116 single engine aircraft, 21 multi-engine aircraft, 2 jet engine aircraft and 1 helicopter. In addition, Gainesville has three heliports, Beaver Trail, Lanier Park Hospital and Latham Creek.

== Economy ==
=== Poultry farming ===
The poultry farming industry in Gainesville began to develop after World War II, when Jesse Jewell, a Gainesville feed salesman, began his business. The format he developed was to sell North Georgia farmers baby chicks and feed on credit. When the chicks were grown, Jewell would buy back the adult chickens (broilers) at a price that would cover his costs and guarantee farmers a profit. Once Jewell signed on enough farmers to produce broilers for him, he invested in his own processing plant and hatchery.

As of 2013, poultry farming remains a significant economic driver in Gainesville, representing six of its top ten employers (7,600 employees), nearly one-quarter of the total population in the city in 2010 (and a higher proportion of the working-age population). It is the most well-known business in the area, with statewide revenue exceeding $3 billion. These jobs have attracted numerous Hispanic workers, adding to the diversity of families in the city and county. The proportion of Hispanic and Latino residents is more than 40 percent of the city's population, where the jobs are.

=== Top employers ===
According to Gainesville's 2012 Comprehensive Annual Financial Report, the top employers in the city are:

#	Employer	# of Employees
1	Northeast Georgia Health System	5,030
2	Fieldale Farms	2,400
3	Pilgrim's	1,600
4	Mar-Jac	1,250
5	Kubota	960
6	Coleman Natural	900
7	The Longstreet Clinic	580
8	Koch Foods	521
9	ZF	440
10	MP Equipment	110

== Culture ==
=== Arts and theater ===
Gainesville is the home of the Gainesville Theater Alliance (GTA), which is a partnership between Brenau University, the University of North Georgia, Theatre Wings, and the Professional Company. This coalition provides theatrical entertainment for the entire Gainesville area. GTA utilizes both professional and student actors in its productions and their performances have been nationally acclaimed.

Brenau University Galleries, established in 1985 by Brenau University President, Dr. John S. Burd, is located at the historic Gainesville, Georgia campus and consists of five art galleries created to house its permanent art collection of over 5,000 works. The Galleries hold local, regional, student, and national rotating exhibitions. The Galleries serve as an educational and cultural resource for Northeast Georgia by way of free public programming and exhibitions.

The Northeast Georgia History Center is a museum established by Brenau University in Downtown Gainesville that focuses on the heritage of the Northeast Georgia region. Some notable exhibits include the Land of Promise and Northeast Georgia Sports Hall of Fame.

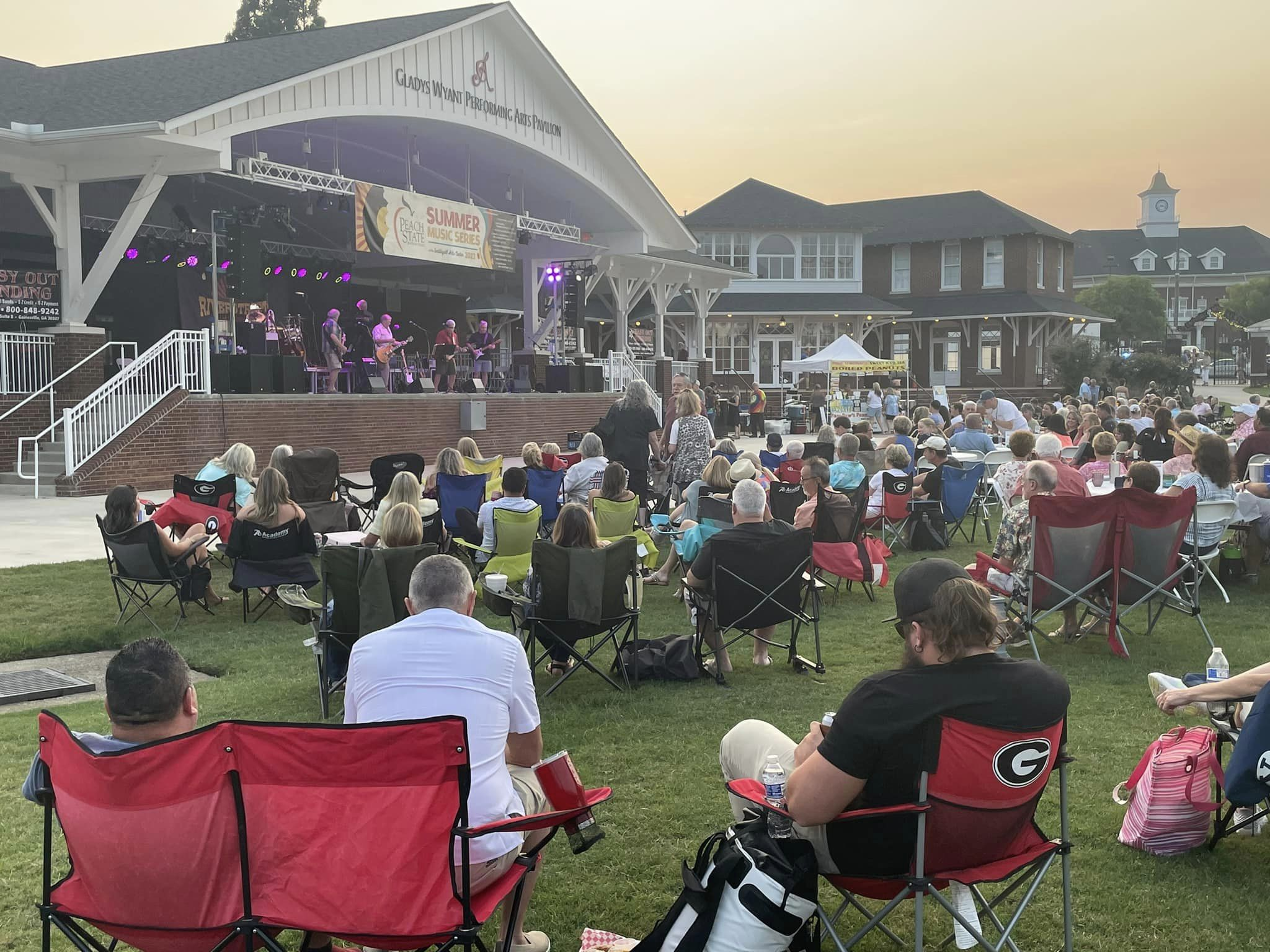
Smithgall Arts Center complex, including the Gladys Wyant Performing Arts Pavilion

The Arts Council is a non-profit organization focused on providing Gainesville residents with a wide variety of visual, performing, and literary arts.. The Arts Council is located in the Smithgall Arts Center, which is a former two-story train depot that the Arts Council purchased from CSX Transportation in 1992. In early 2020, they broke ground on an expansion to include a new 6,300 sr. ft. pavilion that features an outdoor stage and other multi-functional facilities. The ribbon was officially cut on this expansion on April 16, 2021, and named the “Gladys Wyant Performing Arts Pavilion” in honor of Gladys Wyant, who has been the executive director of The Arts Council for the previous 37+ years. This venue, known by many as "The Gladys", has quickly become one of the most popular event venues in Gainesville and North Georgia, as a whole.

The Quinlan Visual Arts Center is a non-profit arts association initially founded as the Gainesville Arts Association in 1942. The Quinlan Visual Arts Center acts as an exhibit, with multiple galleries on display throughout the year, as well as an event center. It is also an affiliate of the Arts Council and provides art classes for both children and adults.

The Gainesville Symphony Orchestra (GSO) was a volunteer orchestra founded in 1982 as the Lanier Symphony Orchestra. However, due to a lack in funding during the Great Recession, the GSO shut down in 2013 after almost 30 years of operation.

Gainesville is also home to the Gainesville Ballet Company which is a partnership with Brenau University and the Gainesville School of Dance. One of their more popular performances throughout the year is Tchaikovsky's The Nutcracker.

Alta Vista Cemetery is a graveyard located just outside Downtown Gainesville. The famous Confederate general James Longstreet is buried here. Other notable gravesites include: several Georgia governors, an astronaut, a rocket scientist, a circus performer, and that of poultry pioneer Jesse Jewell (whom Jesse Jewell Parkway, Gainesville's main thoroughfare, is named after).

== Demographics ==
Historical population
Census	Pop.	Note	%±
1860	344		—
1870	472		37.2%
1880	1,919		306.6%
1890	3,202		66.9%
1900	4,382		36.9%
1910	5,925		35.2%
1920	6,272		5.9%
1930	8,624		37.5%
1940	10,243		18.8%
1950	11,936		16.5%
1960	16,523		38.4%
1970	15,459		−6.4%
1980	15,280		−1.2%
1990	17,885		17.0%
2000	25,578		43.0%
2010	33,804		32.2%
2020	42,296		25.1%
2025 (est.)	49,221	▲	16.4%
U.S. Decennial Census; 2025

=== 2020 census ===
As of the 2020 census, there were 42,296 people, 15,433 households, and 8,796 families residing in the city. The median age was 33.0 years. 24.8% of residents were under the age of 18 and 16.2% were 65 years of age or older. For every 100 females there were 91.4 males, and for every 100 females age 18 and over there were 86.8 males age 18 and over.

97.7% of residents lived in urban areas, while 2.3% lived in rural areas.

Of the 15,433 households, 32.3% had children under the age of 18 living in them. Of all households, 39.2% were married-couple households, 19.4% were households with a male householder and no spouse or partner present, and 34.7% were households with a female householder and no spouse or partner present. About 30.3% of all households were made up of individuals and 12.2% had someone living alone who was 65 years of age or older.

There were 16,936 housing units, of which 8.9% were vacant. The homeowner vacancy rate was 2.6% and the rental vacancy rate was 7.5%.

Racial composition as of the 2020 census
Race	Number	Percent
White	20,332	48.1%
Black or African American	6,169	14.6%
American Indian and Alaska Native	465	1.1%
Asian	1,467	3.5%
Native Hawaiian and Other Pacific Islander	35	0.1%
Some other race	8,555	20.2%
Two or more races	5,273	12.5%
Hispanic or Latino (of any race)	15,650	37.0%

=== 2010 census ===
As of the census of 2010, there were 33,804 people, 11,273 households, and 7,165 families residing in the city. The population density was 1,161.6 people per square mile (448.5 people/km^{2}). There were 12,967 housing units at an average density of 445.6 units per square mile (172.0 units/km^{2}). The racial makeup of the city was 54.2% White, 15.2% African American, 0.6% Native American, 3.2% Asian, 0.2% Pacific Islander, 23.4% from other races, and 3.2% from two or more races. Hispanic or Latino residents of any race were 41.6% of the population.

There were 11,273 households, out of which 30.3% had children under the age of 18 living with them, 39.3% were married couples living together, 18.2% had a female householder with no husband present, and 36.4% were non-families. 28.9% of all households were made up of individuals, and 3.64% had someone living alone who was 65 years of age or older. The average household size was 2.85 and the average family size was 3.55.

Age distribution was 33.9% under the age of 20, 9.5% from 20 to 24, 29.2% from 25 to 44, 16.7% from 45 to 64, and 10.5% who were 65 years of age or older. The median age was 29.5 years. For every 100 females, there were 91.6 males. For every 100 females age 20 and over, there were 84.4 males.

The median income for a household in the city was $38,119, and the median income for a family was $43,734. Males had a median income of $26,377 versus $20,531 for females. The per capita income for the city was $19,439. About 24.9% of families and 29.1% of the population were below the poverty line, including 40.7% of those under age 18 and 17.6% of those age 65 or over. In May 2013, the unemployment rate was 6.9%, less than the overall rate in Georgia of 8.3%, the US of 7.6%

Of the population aged 15 years and over, 31.0% have never been married; 50.0% are now married; 2.4% are separated; 7.7% are widowed; and 9.9% are divorced.

== Healthcare ==
Gainesville is home to the Northeast Georgia Medical Center Gainesville, which houses a Level I Trauma Center and the Georgia Heart Center.

== Government and infrastructure ==
Arrendale State Prison of the Georgia Department of Corrections is a women's prison located in unincorporated Habersham County, near Alto, and in the Gainesville area.

== Education ==
Three African Americans, Beulah Rucker, E. E. Butler, and Ulysses Byas were educational pioneers in Gainesville and Hall County. Rucker founded Timber Ridge Elementary School, the first school for Black children in Gainesville, in 1911. In 1951, she established a night high school for African-American veterans, which was the only High School for veterans in Georgia. E. E. Butler served as an educator for just one year before earning his Physician's license. In 1954, he became one of two who became the first Black men on the Gainesville City Schools Board of Education, a very unusual situation in the United States. When the schools were integrated in 1969, Byas, like most Black school principals was offered a demotion. Rather than take a job as an assistant principal at Gainesville High School, he moved to Tuskegee, Alabama, where he became the nation's first Black school superintendent.

=== Historical schools ===
E. E. Butler High School was a segregated school created in 1962 in response to court demands for equalization of resources for Black students. After the integration of public schools, it was closed in 1969.

=== Gainesville City School District ===
The Gainesville City School District holds pre-school to grade twelve, and consists of five elementary schools, a middle school, and a high school. The district has 282 full-time teachers and over 4,438 students. Its lone high school, Gainesville High School boasts several notable alumni, including Deshaun Watson, Cleveland Browns quarterback, Cris Carpenter, former professional baseball player (St. Louis Cardinals, Florida Marlins, Texas Rangers, Milwaukee Brewers), Tasha Humphrey, professional basketball player, and Micah Owings, current professional baseball player (Arizona Diamondbacks, Cincinnati Reds, San Diego Padres). The mascot for Gainesville High School is the Red Elephant.

=== Hall County School District ===
The Hall County School District holds pre-school to grade twelve, and consists of twenty-one elementary schools, six middle schools, and seven high schools. The district has 1,337 full-time teachers and over 21,730 students. The high schools in this district have produced a number of notable alumni including, Connor Shaw, starting quarterback for the University of South Carolina Gamecocks football team; Casey Cagle, Lt. Governor, State of Georgia; James Mills, Georgia State Representative; A.J. Styles, professional wrestler; Deshaun Watson, starting quarterback for the Houston Texans, Mike "MoonPie" Wilson, former NFL football player; Chester Willis, former NFL football player; Jody Davis, former catcher for Chicago Cubs and Atlanta Braves baseball teams; Billy Greer, bass guitarist for progressive rock band Kansas; Corey Hulsey, former NFL Oakland Raiders football player; Robin Spriggs, author and actor; and Martrez Milner, American football tight end.

=== Private education ===
Notable private schools in Gainesville include: Riverside Military Academy, a private, college preparatory, boarding and day school for boys in grades 6 through 12; and Lakeview Academy, a private, nondenominational, coeducational day school for students in preschool through 12th grade. From 1928 to 2011, Gainesville was also home to Brenau Academy, a female, college preparatory, residential school for grades 9–12, and a part of the Brenau University system. However, in 2011 Brenau Academy was revamped into a program allowing qualified young women to earn college credits during the time in their lives in which they would normally complete high school studies.

=== Higher education ===
Gainesville has several institutions of higher education: University of North Georgia (formerly Gainesville State College), which was established January 8, 2013, as a result of the consolidation of North Georgia College and State University and Gainesville State College; Brenau University, a private, not-for-profit, undergraduate- and graduate-level higher education institution; the Interactive College of Technology; and Lanier Technical College.

== Law ==
Established in 2005, the Public Defender's Office at Gainesville provides representation for persons accused of felony offenses in Hall County. Attorneys from the office have been recognized for their community involvement, as well as for their acumen in the courtroom. In 2008, a first-year attorney successfully challenged the Sex Offender Registration Law in the Georgia Supreme Court.

== Notable people ==
- Tommy Aaron, professional golfer, 1973 Masters champion
- Mariah Paris Balenciaga, drag queen and television personality
- Ashley D. Bell, American politician
- Jodi Benson, voice actress, played Princess Ariel in Disney's The Little Mermaid
- Roy D. Bridges, Jr., astronaut
- Casey Cagle, former Lieutenant Governor of Georgia, 2007–2019
- Rod Cameron, actor
- Allen D. Candler, Governor of Georgia
- Cris Carpenter, former Major League Baseball pitcher
- Daniel Carver, former Ku Klux Klan Grand Dragon
- John Casper, astronaut
- Doug Collins, former member of the United States House of Representatives and United States Secretary of Veterans Affairs
- Jason Cross, professional wrestler
- Henry Crowder, professional jazz musician
- Jody Davis, professional baseball player (Major League Baseball)
- Nathan Deal, 82nd Governor of Georgia, grew up in Millen
- Dexter Fowler, Major League Baseball center fielder for the St. Louis Cardinals
- Jentezen Franklin, Pastor
- Chan Gailey, former head coach of various National Football League (NFL) and college football teams
- John Driskell Hopkins, bassist for the Zac Brown Band
- Corey Hulsey, guard for the Detroit Lions (NFL)
- Tasha Humphrey, Washington Mystics (WNBA) basketball player
- A.J. Johnson former Denver Broncos linebacker in the NFL and University of Tennessee linebacker
- T.J. Jones, former Detroit Lions (NFL) and University of Notre Dame wide receiver
- Sung Kang, actor
- Benny Lichtenwalner, co-founder of crime-scene cleanup company Biotrauma
- James Longstreet, former high-ranking Confederate general; moved to Gainesville from New Orleans in 1876
- Reg Murphy, former president of National Geographic Society and publisher//editor
- Alexander R. Nininger, World War II Medal of Honor recipient, Battle of Bataan
- Micah Owings, Major League Baseball pitcher
- Randy Pobst, professional racing driver
- Robert Prechter, financial forecaster (1980s "Guru of the Decade")
- Blake Sims, former University of Alabama quarterback
- James Milton Smith, Governor of Georgia
- AJ Styles, professional wrestler signed to WWE
- Deshaun Watson, quarterback for the Cleveland Browns (NFL)
- Margaret O'Connor Wilson, civic leader
- Margaret Woodrow Wilson, daughter of US President Woodrow Wilson
- Mike Wilson, former NFL offensive lineman

== See also ==
- 1936 Tupelo–Gainesville tornado outbreak
