= Notice of violation =

Notices of violation are issued from Code Enforcement by local cities or towns when properties may be contrary to local codes and regulation, vehicles are substandard, inoperable or may have constituted a public nuisance. The ordinances under which violation notices or statements are performed vary from one country to another and between cities within a country or states.

== Buildings ==
When property owners or tenants are found to have violated some code rules depending on area, they are given notices of violation, following which they have thirty to sixty days to correct the violation in question. Should the violation not be addressed or corrected within these time periods, or should other violations happen, the properties may be (though are not always) condemned by the Code Regulations, by health department or by building inspections workers/officials. This is when businesses (better known as commercial property), school/college properties or residences (houses, apartments, townhouses, etc.) are marked not suitable for human occupancy, not safe or dangerous.

Many cities and countries perform a violation notice on construction projects if/when they are not safe, are without a (proper) permit by which the construction can be approved or if the site contractors violate the license for which they are performing the construction work, for which case these licenses and permits may be revoked (taken away).

== Vehicles ==
Vehicles that are substandard, not operable or are obsolete are classified by some regions as "junk". Other reasons are vehicles still operable at the time, although abandoned for prolonged times, are given traffic citations/tickets and other violations. Abandoned vehicles, although still operable, are often issued violation notices; if/when owners of these vehicles do not comply to get the vehicles removed from questionable areas, they can (will sometimes) be towed. Sometimes, however, prior warnings will not be sent to vehicle owners.

== See also ==
- Condemned property
- Local ordinance
- Property management
- Salvage title
