= North Carolina Highway 65 =

State highway in North Carolina, US

North Carolina Highway 65

Route information
- Maintained by NCDOT
- Length: 47.7 mi (76.8 km)
- Existed: 1934–present

Major junctions
- West end: US 52 in Rural Hall
- US 311 in Walnut Cove; US 158 in Stokesdale; US 220 near Stokesdale
- East end: US 158 / US 29 Bus. / NC 87 in Reidsville

Location
- Country: United States
- State: North Carolina
- Counties: Forsyth, Stokes, Guilford, Rockingham

Highway system
- North Carolina Highway System; Interstate; US; State; Scenic
← US 64	→ NC 66

North Carolina Highway 65 (NC 65) is a primary state highway in the U.S. state of North Carolina. Traveling east–west within the Piedmont Triad, it connects the towns of Rural Hall, Walnut Cove, Stokesdale and Wentworth with the city of Reidsville.

== Route description ==
NC 65 is a 47.7-mile (76.8 km) rural highway from U.S. Route 52 (US 52) in Rural Hall, to US 158/US 29 Business (US 29 Bus.)/NC 87 in Reidsville. It passes through the counties of Forsyth (two instances), Stokes, Guilford, and Rockingham.

The signed highway begins at exit 118 of US 52 (John M. Gold Freeway) on the border between Winston-Salem and Rural Hall. The surface road continues southwest as Bethania-Rural Hall Road towards Bethania. NC 65 heads north towards Rural Hall's town center where it intersects NC 66. Heading northeast out of the town, it travels into a more rural area of Forsyth County before entering Germanton and has a concurrency with NC 8. During its one-mile-long (1.6 km) concurrency, NC 65 crosses into Stokes County. Between Germanton and Walnut Creek, NC 65 travels east staying just to the south of Town Fork Creek. After a brief concurrency with US 311, NC 65 has a short segment where it crosses a railroad at-grade and makes a left turn to continue towards Stokesdale. The highway reenters Forsyth County and passes to the south of Belews Lake. Through its second trip in Forsyth County, the road's surroundings is mostly forest except around the community of Belews Creek.

As the road continues east, NC 65 enters Guilford County. At the county line, the road enters the town of Stokesdale. As it approaches the central business district of the town, NC 65 reaches an intersection with US 158 where the two northern legs of the intersection include NC 65 and the southern legs include US 158. Northeast of downtown Stokesdale, the highway has a short concurrency with NC 68 through the northern reaches of Stokesdale and Guilford County. Before reaching the county and town line, NC 65 breaks off the NC 68 mainline to head into Rockingham County. After traveling on a winding road, it reaches US 220 where an interchange is being constructed as a part of the Interstate 73 construction project. NC 65 travels northeast, later north-northeast, through a mostly forested area with some clusters of small farms and houses. At a skewed intersection between the community of Bethany and Wentworth, NC 65 makes a turn towards the east that also marks the eastern terminus of NC 704. Shortly after NC 704, the highway enters the town limits of Wentworth, also the seat of Rockingham County. The road heads east and southeast through the small town passing county offices and Rockingham Community College and the Carter Plantation. Near the center of town, NC 87 joins NC 65 from the north for a concurrency that will last for the remainder of NC 65's route. They pass Rockingham County High School and a quarry until the road reaches an interchange with US 158 and US 29 Bus. (Freeway Drive) in Reidsville. NC 65 ends at this point while NC 87 continues south along the freeway. The surface road continues into downtown Reidsville as Harrison Street.

== History ==
The first NC 65 was an original state highway that traversed between NC 75/NC 80, in Mocksville, and NC 14, near Yanceyville. The route went through downtown Winston-Salem, via Burk Street, Fourth Street, Main Street, 3rd Street and Dunleith Avenue; it also went through Stokesdale, Wentworth and Reidsville. By 1926, NC 65 was rerouted along Fifth Street from Third Street. In 1929, NC 65 was adjusted along a more straight route between Winston-Salem and Stokesdale, bypassing south of Belews Creek. In 1930, NC 65 was extended east through Yanceyville to NC 55/NC 57, in Roxboro. In 1931, NC 65 was decommissioned in favor of an extension of NC 48.

The second and current NC 65 was established in 1934 as new primary routing between NC 66 in Rural Hall to US 158/NC 48, in Stokesdale. In 1935, NC 65 was extended, as new primary routing, northeast to Reidsville then northwest to NC 700/NC 770, east of Leaksville–Spray (modern-day Eden). By 1936, NC 65 was extended southwest from Rural Hall to US 421 in Pfafftown. In 1937, NC 65's northern terminus was shifted to NC 54 south of Leaksville. In 1941, NC 65 swapped routing with US 158 between Stokesdale and Reidsville, creating the opposing cater-corner intersection at Stokesdale; the old alignment north of Reidsville became NC 14. By 1957, NC 65 was placed on a concurrency with US 311 in Walnut Cove; its former routing, via Plant Street and Stokesburg Road, was downgraded to secondary roads. In 1969, NC 65 was truncated at NC 67 west of Bethania; its former alignment along Transou Road to Pfafftown was downgraded to secondary roads as well. In 1997, NC 65 was truncated to its current eastern terminus at US 158 / US 29 Bus.; its old alignment along Harrison Avenue to Scales Street was downgraded to a secondary road. By 2000, NC 65 was truncated to its current western terminus at US 52 in Rural Hall.

== Major intersections ==
County	Location	mi	km	Destinations	Notes
Forsyth	Rural Hall	0.0	0.0	I-74 east / US 52 (John Gold Memorial Expressway) – Winston-Salem, Wytheville, High Point	Exit 118 (US 52), Folded Diamond Interchange
Forsyth	Rural Hall	2.5	4.0	NC 66 (Broad Street) – Stanleyville, Westfield	
Forsyth		6.1	9.8	NC 8 south (Germanton Road) – Winston-Salem	South end of NC 8 overlap
Stokes	Germanton	7.1	11.4	NC 8 north – Danbury	North end of NC 8 overlap; to Hanging Rock State Park
Stokes	Walnut Cove	11.6	18.7	US 311 south (Main Street) – Walkertown, Winston-Salem	South end of US 311 overlap
Stokes	Walnut Cove	12.3	19.8	US 311 north (Main Street) – Walnut Cove	North end of US 311 overlap
Forsyth	No major junctions				
Guilford	Stokesdale	22.7	36.5	US 158 – Winston-Salem	
Guilford	Stokesdale	23.6	38.0	NC 68 south – PTI Airport, High Point	South end of NC 68 overlap
Guilford	Stokesdale	24.3	39.1	NC 68 north – Madison	North end of NC 68 overlap
Rockingham		26.6	42.8	US 220 – Summerfield, Madison	Diamond interchange
Rockingham		39.7	63.9	NC 704 west – Madison	
Rockingham	Wentworth	43.9	70.7	NC 87 north – Eden	North end of NC 87 overlap
Rockingham	Reidsville	47.7	76.8	US 158 / US 29 Bus. / NC 87 south (Freeway Drive) – Greensboro, Danville	South end of NC 87 overlap, Partial cloverleaf interchange.
1.000 mi = 1.609 km; 1.000 km = 0.621 mi: Concurrency terminus
