= Interstate 74 =

Interstate Highway in the Midwest and in North Carolina

Interstate 74
- I-74 highlighted in red

Route information
- Length: 572.53 mi (921.40 km) As of September 19, 2026
- Existed: August 14, 1957–present
- NHS: Entire route

Original segment
- West end: I-80 in Davenport, IA
- Major intersections: I-80 / I-280 in Colona, IL; I-55 / US 51 in Bloomington, IL; I-57 in Champaign, IL; I-65 / I-69 / I-70 in Indianapolis, IN
- East end: I-75 / US 52 in Cincinnati, OH

Western North Carolina segment
- West end: I-77 at the Virginia state line near Pine Ridge, NC
- East end: US 52 in Mount Airy, NC

Central North Carolina segment
- West end: US 52 in Rural Hall, NC
- Major intersections: I-40 in Winston-Salem, NC; I-85 in Archdale, NC; I-73 / US 220 in Randleman, NC
- East end: US 74 Bus. near Hamlet, NC

Eastern North Carolina segment
- West end: US 74 Alt. / US 74 Bus. in Maxton, NC
- Major intersections: I-95 / US 301 in Lumberton, NC
- South end: US 74 near Lumberton, NC

Location
- Country: United States
- States: Iowa, Illinois, Indiana, Ohio; North Carolina

Highway system
- Interstate Highway System; Main; Auxiliary; Suffixed; Business; Future

Interstate 74 (I-74) is an Interstate Highway in the Midwestern and Southeastern United States. Its western end is at an interchange with I-80 in Davenport, Iowa; the eastern end of its Midwest segment is at an interchange with I-75 in Cincinnati, Ohio. The major cities that I-74 connects to include Davenport, Iowa; Peoria, Bloomington, and Champaign, Illinois; Indianapolis, Indiana; and Cincinnati, Ohio. I-74 also exists as three disconnected sections of highways in North Carolina.

== Route description ==
Lengths
	mi	km
IA	5.36	8.63
IL	220.34	354.60
IN	171.54	276.07
OH	19.47	31.33
WV		
VA		
NC	155.01	249.46
SC		
Total	571.72	920.09

=== Iowa ===
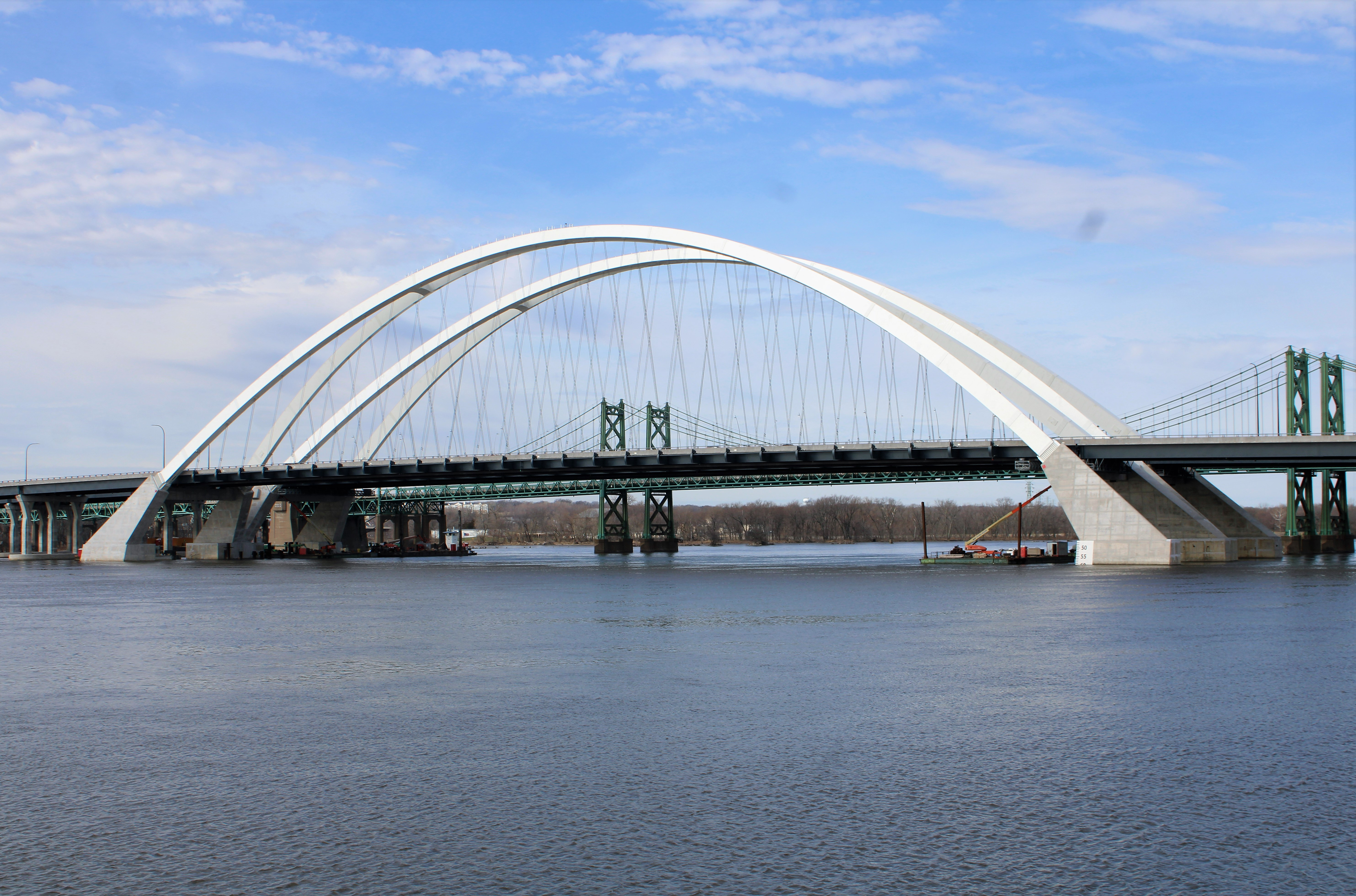
The I-74 Bridge over the Mississippi River between Bettendorf, Iowa, and Moline, Illinois

In the state of Iowa, I-74 runs south from I-80 for 5.36 miles (8.63 km) before crossing into Illinois on the I-74 Bridge. North of the Mississippi River, I-74 bisects Bettendorf and Davenport.

=== Illinois ===
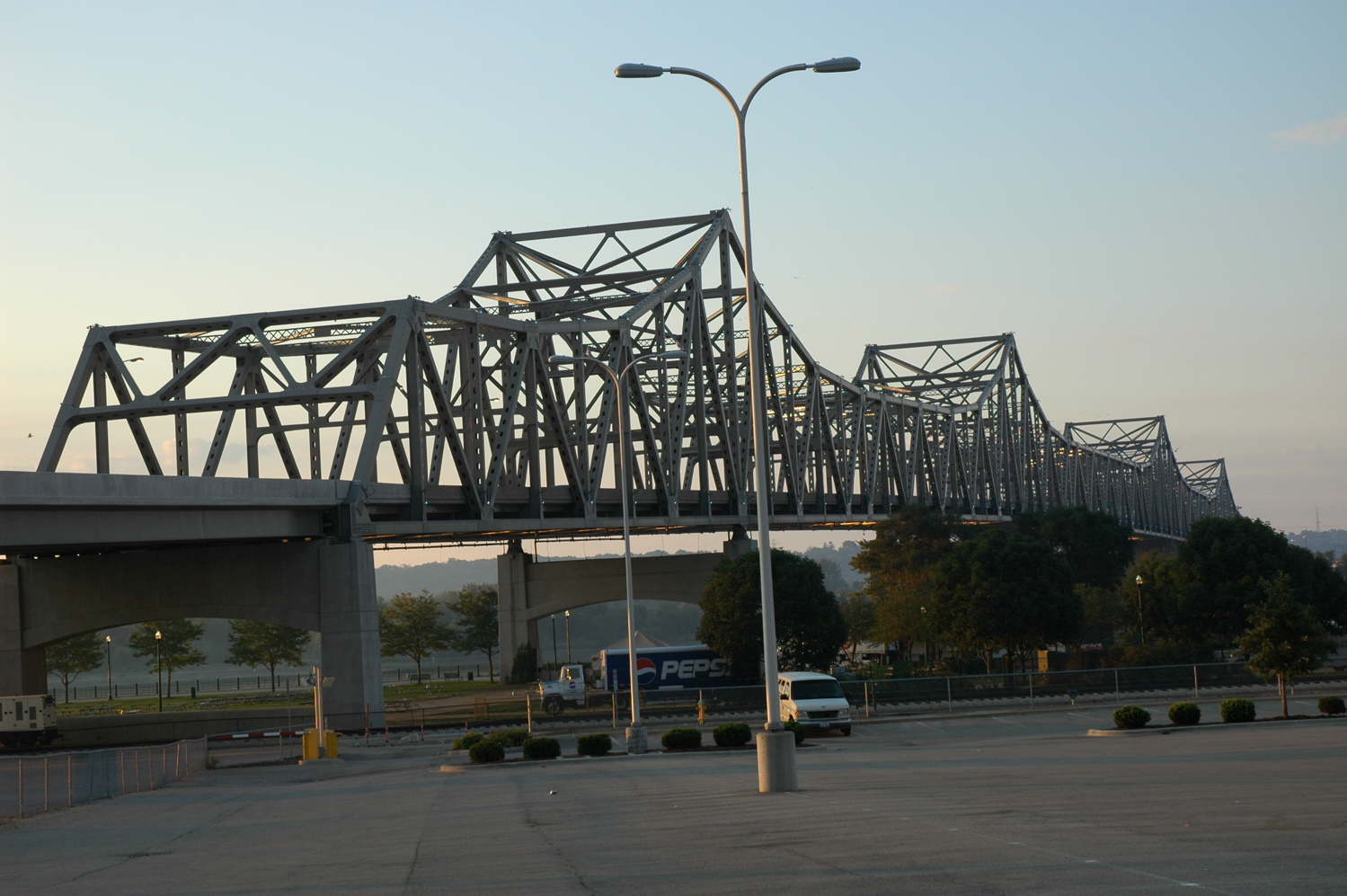
Murray Baker Bridge over the Illinois River in Peoria, Illinois

In the state of Illinois, I-74 runs south from Moline to Galesburg; from this point, it runs southeast through Peoria to the Bloomington–Normal area and I-55. I-74 continues southeasterly to the Champaign–Urbana metropolitan area, intersecting I-57. The Interstate then runs east past Danville at the Illinois–Indiana state line. U.S. Route 150 (US 150) parallels I-74 in Illinois for its entire length, save the last few miles on the eastern end (in Danville, when US 150 turns south on Illinois Route 1 [IL 1]), where it parallels US 136.

=== Indiana ===
In the state of Indiana, I-74 runs east from the Illinois state line to the Crawfordsville area before turning southeasterly. It then runs around the city center of Indianapolis along I-69 and I-465. Once I-74 reaches the southeast side of Indianapolis, it diverges from I-69 and I-465 and continues to the southeast. It then enters Ohio at Harrison.

=== Ohio ===
In the state of Ohio, I-74 runs southeast from the Indiana border to the western segment's current eastern terminus at I-75 just north of Downtown Cincinnati. It is also signed with US 52 for its entire length. While planned to continue through West Virginia and Virginia to the I-74 section in North Carolina, the route remains unsigned or unbuilt past Cincinnati. At this point, I-74 would follow US 52 or more likely follow State Route 32 (SR 32), east from Cincinnati.

=== North Carolina ===
In the state of North Carolina, as of September 2026, I-74 exists in three segments, starting with a concurrency with I-77 at the Virginia border. This includes the most western portion from I-77 to US 52 just south of Mount Airy, a segment along the Winston-Salem Northern Beltway, a segment first opened to traffic as a bypass of High Point then extended west to I-40 east of Winston-Salem and east to I-73 near Randleman, then another along the southern segment of I–73 and US 220 from just north of Asheboro to northwest of Rockingham, and finally a more eastern segment that runs from Laurinburg to an end at NC 41 near Lumberton. One of the latest segments to be signed, from I-40 to High Point, occurred after the federal government approved signing this section as I-74 in mid-2013, despite the highway not being up to current Interstate Highway standards. It was uncertain why the Federal Highway Administration (FHWA) made an exception, but this might have been the result of a misinterpretation when a state highway administrator asked for Interstate designation for another section and "Future Interstate" for the section already completed that did not meet standards. The Rockingham bypass was completed and opened to traffic on January 28, 2025.

== Future ==
Long-range plans call for I-74 to continue east and south of Cincinnati to North Carolina using SR 32 from Cincinnati to Piketon, Ohio, and then the proposed I-73 from Portsmouth, Ohio, through West Virginia (along parts of current US 52 and WV Route 108) to I-77. It would then follow I-77 through Virginia into North Carolina, where I-74 splits from I-77 near the Virginia state line and runs eastward to northwest US 52, which it will eventually follow to Winston-Salem, then through High Point to I-73. I-73 and I-74 overlap to Rockingham.

In 1996, the American Association of State Highway and Transportation Officials (AASHTO) approved the signing of highways as I-74 along its proposed path east (south) of I-81 in Wytheville, Virginia, where those highways meet Interstate Highway standards. North Carolina started putting up I-74 signs along its roadways in 1997. As of December 2008, I-74 is proposed to follow the path of I-77 through the state of Virginia but remains unsigned from the West Virginia border to the North Carolina border.

=== Ohio ===
The 1991 plan to build I-73 soon included an extension of I-74 from where it ended in Hamilton County to I-73 at Portsmouth, Ohio, possibly along SR 32.

In November 1991, Congress passed the $151-billion (equivalent to $309 billion in 2024) Intermodal Surface Transportation Efficiency Act (ISTEA) that included the I-73/74 North-South Corridor and made I-73 a priority and included an extension of I-74 from Hamilton County to I-73 at Portsmouth.

On August 31, 1992, the Ohio Turnpike Commission passed a resolution to study making the extension of I-74 a toll road. Congress had authorized paying for 80 percent of the cost, but the state would have to pay the remainder of the $56 million (equivalent to $112 million in 2024).

The Ohio Turnpike Commission proposed that the extension run along SR 32; while Representative Jim Bunning of Kentucky wanted the road to begin in the west as part of a greater Cincinnati/Northern Kentucky bypass, returning to Ohio near Maysville, Kentucky.

=== West Virginia ===
As of October 2009, I-74 remains unbuilt in the state of West Virginia. The West Virginia Department of Transportation (WVDOT) is currently upgrading the Tolsia Highway to four lanes but not to Interstate Highway standards.

It was estimated that improving US 52 to Interstate standards in West Virginia would cost $2 billion (equivalent to $4.09 billion in 2024). Still, by 1994, improvements to US 52 were planned, and future plans called for I-73 to follow that route. The I-74 extension seemed more certain.

=== North Carolina ===
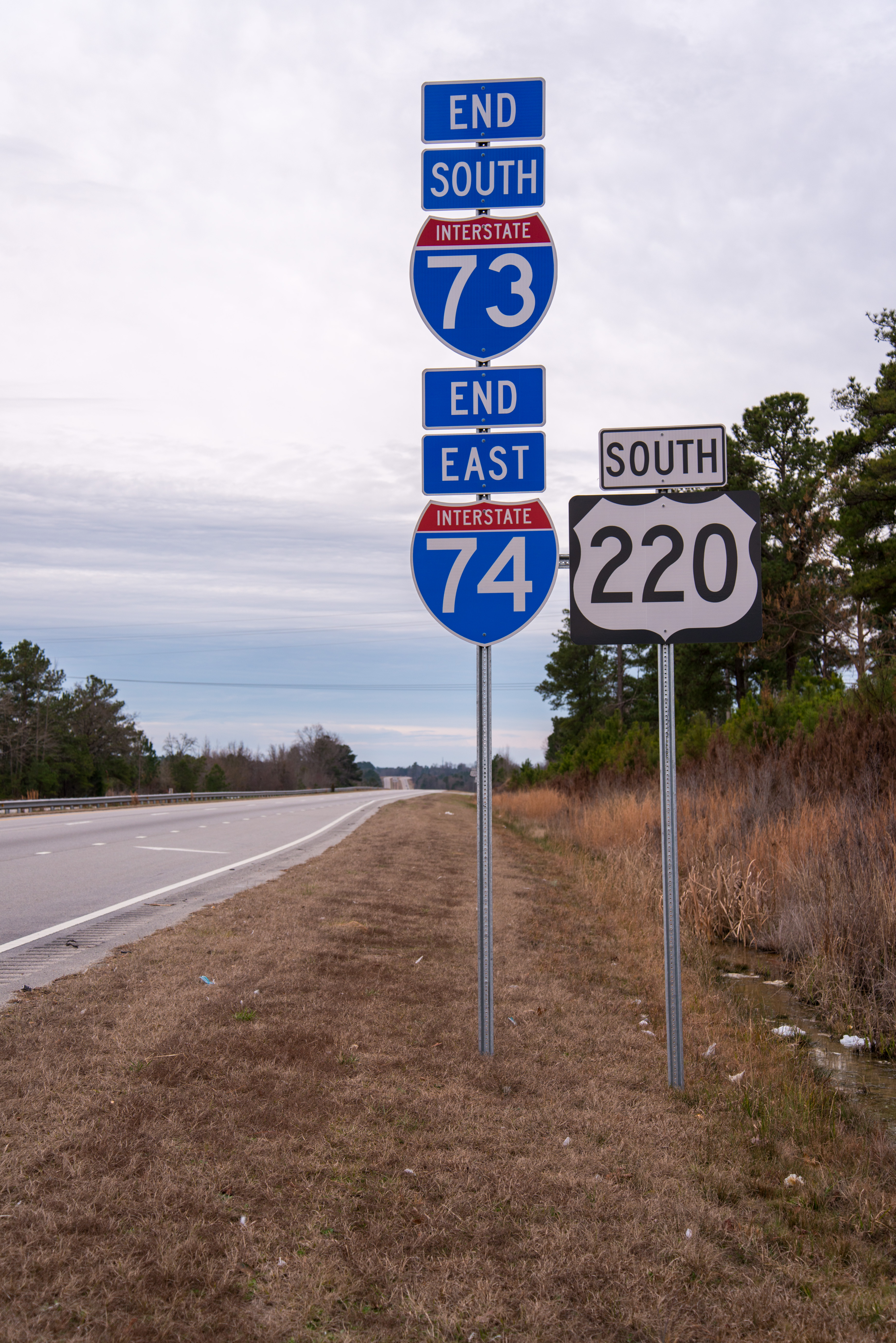
I-73/I-74 former end near Ellerbe, North Carolina

The proposed path of I-74 east of I-95 in North Carolina is still being debated. The current plan takes the route along US 74 to NC 211 near Bolton then south along US 17 to near the South Carolina border. These sections are not currently proposed to be built perhaps for another 20 to 30 years. The North Carolina Turnpike Authority—at the request of officials in Brunswick County—are studying whether a toll road could get the section of I-74 in that county built faster.

Starting west of Rockingham and from Laurinburg to Maxton and to the east, I-74 runs concurrent with US 74. This was the first time that a U.S. Route and Interstate Highway with the same number have been designated on the same highway. A similar situation occurred more recently in June 2015 when Wisconsin started routing I-41 along the route of US 41.

=== South Carolina ===
On February 11, 2005, the North Carolina Department of Transportation (NCDOT) and South Carolina Department of Transportation (SCDOT) came to an agreement over where I-74 (and I-73) would cross the border between the two states. It was decided that I-74 would cross the line as a northern extension of South Carolina Highway 31 (SC 31). SC 31 is being used a temporarily placeholder designation until the I-74 from North Carolina connect the South Carolina proposed route. I-74 is then proposed to end south of Myrtle Beach at SC 707. In the 1990s, both I-73 and I-74 were to end at Georgetown but funding cannot allow for the possible extensions to Georgetown or Charleston. In November 2019, both NCDOT and SCDOT released maps of where I-74 could go to from South Carolina to North Carolina.

== Junction list ==
Iowa
I-80 in Davenport
US 6 on the Davenport–Bettendorf city line. The highways travel concurrently to Moline, Illinois.
US 67 in Bettendorf
Illinois
I-280 / US 6 in Moline. I-74/I-280 travels concurrently to Colona.
I-80 / I-280 in Colona
US 34 in Galesburg
US 150 east of Knoxville
I-474 west of Peoria
US 150 in Peoria
US 24 / US 150 in East Peoria
I-474 in East Peoria
I-155 in Morton
US 150 north-northwest of Yuton
I-39 in Normal, Illinois
I-55 / US 51 northwest of Normal. I-55/I-74 travels concurrently to Bloomington. I-74/US 51 travels concurrently to south of Bloomington.
US 150 in Bloomington
US 136 south-southeast of Le Roy
I-57 in Champaign
US 45 in Urbana
US 150 east-northeast of Oakwood
US 150 in Tilton
Indiana
US 41 in Veedersburg
US 231 in Crawfordsville
I-465 / US 136 on the Indianapolis–Speedway line. I-74/I-465 travels concurrently into Indianapolis proper.
US 36 in Indianapolis. The highways travel concurrently through Indianapolis.
US 40 in Indianapolis. The highways travel concurrently through Indianapolis.
I-70 in Indianapolis
I-69 in Indianapolis. I-69/I-74 travel concurrently until I-74 leaves I-465.
US 31 in Indianapolis. The highways travel concurrently through Indianapolis.
I-65 in Indianapolis
I-69 / I-465 / US 31 / US 36 / US 40 / US 421 in Indianapolis. I-74/US 421 travels concurrently to northwest of Greensburg.
US 52 west-northwest of West Harrison. The highways travel concurrently to Cincinnati, Ohio.
Ohio
I-275 west-northwest of Miamitown. The highways travel concurrently to northwest of Dent.
US 27 in Cincinnati
US 27 / US 127 in Cincinnati
I-75 / US 52 in Cincinnati
Gap in route
North Carolina
I-77 at the Virginia state line north-northwest of Pine Ridge. The highways travel concurrently to west-southwest of Pine Ridge.
US 601 in White Plains
US 52 east of White Plains
Gap in route
US 52 in Rural Hall
US 311 in Walkertown
US 158 in Walkertown
US 421 in Kernersville
I-40 in Winston-Salem
US 29 in High Point
I-85 east-northeast of Archdale
I-73 / US 220 in Randleman. I-73/I-74 travels concurrently to northwest of Rockingham. I-74/US 220 travels concurrently to Emery.
US 74 / US 74 Bus. northwest of Rockingham
Gap in route

US 74 / US 74 Alt. / US 74 Bus. southeast of Maxton. I-74/US 74 travels concurrently to Lumberton.
I-95 / US 301 west-southwest of Lumberton
US 74 in Lumberton

== Auxiliary routes ==
- I-274: A partially completed bypass of Winston-Salem, North Carolina, planned to follow the western half of the Winston-Salem Northern Beltway.
- I-474: A southwestern bypass loop of Peoria, Illinois.
