= North Carolina Highway 66 =

State highway in North Carolina, US

North Carolina Highway 66
- NC 66 highlighted in red

Route information
- Maintained by NCDOT
- Length: 47.0 mi (75.6 km)
- Existed: 1934–present
- Tourist routes: Hanging Rock Scenic Byway

Major junctions
- South end: I-74 near Horneytown
- I-40 in Kernersville; US 421 / NC 150 in Kernersville; US 158 in Walkertown; US 311 in Walkertown; I-74 near Rural Hall
- North end: NC 89 in Johnstown

Location
- Country: United States
- State: North Carolina
- Counties: Forsyth, Stokes

Highway system
- North Carolina Highway System; Interstate; US; State; Scenic
← NC 65	→ NC 67

North Carolina Highway 66 (NC 66) is a 47.0-mile (75.6 km) North Carolina state highway that travels from Horneytown to Johnstown, connecting the towns and communities of eastern Forsyth and Stokes counties.

== Route description ==
NC 66 begins with exit 63 of I-74 in Horneytown, which surrounds the southern outskirts of Kernersville, in Southeastern Forsyth County. NC 66 continues inside Kernersville, where it comes to the interchange with I-40 (exit 203), before coming to the downtown area. Inside downtown, the route comes to the junction with Salem Parkway (US 421). NC 66 continues inside the center of downtown before traversing along the northwestern outskirts of the town, where it enters into northeast Forsyth County and traverses parallel with I-74. NC 66 enters into Walkertown, where it intersects with US 158 and US 311, in which the two routes gives direct access to the overall center of Winston-Salem and areas north of Walkertown. NC 66 briefly traverses the northeast outskirts of Winston-Salem, before continuing northwest into Rural Hall. When inside Rural Hall, the route comes to a junction with I-74 (Winston-Salem Northern Beltway), and an intersection with NC 65. After traversing inside the downtown area of Rural Hall, NC 66 enters into Stokes County and inside the municipality of King. South of central King, NC 66 heads north towards Gap. The highway then runs through the mountains of curvy roads until reaching its northern terminus at a Y-intersection with NC 89.

== History ==
The first NC 66 was an original state highway. It began at NC 60 and NC 65 the current intersection of 4th Street and Cherry Street in Winston-Salem. NC 66 then headed north along today's University Parkway to Stanleyville. From there, NC 66 continues up to Pilot Mountain. In late 1921, NC 66 was extended to NC 89, in Westfield. In 1922, NC 66 was rerouted to Mount Airy. Then NC 66 went north to the Virginia state line. In 1923, NC 66 was rerouted to go from Mount Airy to Virginia State Route 15 at the state line. In 1925, NC 66 was rerouted to follow Patterson Avenue into Winston-Salem. From there, NC 66 replaced NC 64 to Lexington. In 1926, US 121 was assigned the entire routing of NC 66. In 1934, US 52 replaced both US 121 and NC 66 in entirety. The current NC 66 was designated in late 1934 as a renumbering of NC 661. It went from US 52 (old NC 66) in Rural Hall to NC 89 to the north. In 1936, NC 66 was routed along US 52 to Stanleyville. Then NC 66 was extended to US 421 (current Old Greensboro Road) along new routing. Between 1947 and 1949, NC 66 was routed south of Walkertown. In 1955, NC 66 was extended along US 421 to Kernersville and then on new primary routing to US 311.

=== North Carolina Highway 64 ===
North Carolina Highway 64
- Location: Lexington–Winston-Salem
- Existed: 1921–1925

North Carolina Highway 64 (NC 64) was an original state highway that traversed from NC 10, in Lexington, north to NC 60/NC 77 (Waughtown Street), in Winston-Salem. In 1925, NC 64 was renumbered as an extension of NC 66.

In 1932, NC 64 reappeared as a mostly new primary routing; except around Coleridge, where it replaced part of NC 902. It traversed from US 421/NC 60 (Liberty Road), in Greensboro, going southeast through Climax, Franklinville, Ramseur, Coleridge and Bennett, to NC 74 (today NC 24/NC 27), west of Carthage. In late 1934, NC 64 was renumbered as NC 22.

=== North Carolina Highway 661 ===
North Carolina Highway 661
- Location: Rural Hall–Johnstown
- Existed: 1921–1935

North Carolina Highway 661 (NC 661) was an original state highway that traversed from NC 66, in King, to NC 89, in Moores Springs. In 1923, NC 661 was extended northwest along NC 89 to Francisco, then replaced NC 893 to the Virginia state line. In 1924, NC 661 was rerouted at Gap to NC 89 west of Francisco then east along NC 89 to Francisco before continuing to the state line, leaving behind Moore Springs Road (SR 1001). In 1926, NC 661 was rerouted on both ends: south-end to NC 66, in Rural Hall, and north-end being truncated at NC 89, in the Johnstown community; its old segment northeast of NC 89 became a secondary road, later becoming part of NC 704. In 1935, NC 661 was renumbered as part of NC 66.

== Major intersections ==
County	Location	mi	km	Destinations	Notes
Forsyth		0.0– 0.2	0.0– 0.32	I-74 – Winston-Salem, High Point	Exit 63 (I-74)
Forsyth	Kernersville	4.8– 4.9	7.7– 7.9	I-40 – Winston-Salem, Greensboro	Exit 203 (I-40)
Forsyth	Kernersville	6.8– 6.9	10.9– 11.1	US 421 / NC 150 – Winston-Salem, Greensboro	Exit 222 (US 421)
Forsyth	Walkertown	13.2	21.2	US 158 – Winston-Salem, Stokesdale	
Forsyth	Walkertown	14.5	23.3	US 311 – Winston-Salem	
Forsyth	Winston-Salem	20.5	33.0	NC 8 – Winston-Salem, Germanton	
Forsyth		21.5– 21.7	34.6– 34.9	I-74 – Wytheville, High Point	Partial cloverleaf interchange; exit 42 (NC 74), opened to traffic on November 7, 2022
Forsyth	Rural Hall	24.8	39.9	NC 65 – Germanton	
Stokes		40.6	65.3	NC 268 west – Pilot Mountain	West end of NC 268 overlap
Stokes		40.7	65.5	NC 268 east	East end of NC 268 overlap
Stokes	Johnstown	47.0	75.6	NC 89 – Westfield, Francisco	
1.000 mi = 1.609 km; 1.000 km = 0.621 mi: Concurrency terminus

== See also ==
- North Carolina Bicycle Route 4 - concurrent with NC 66 from Gap to NC 268
