= Interstate 74 in North Carolina =

Highway in North Carolina

Interstate 74
- I-74 highlighted in red; future segments in blue; unbuilt future segments in orange

Route information
- Maintained by NCDOT
- Length: 155.01 mi (249.46 km)
- Existed: 1997–present
- NHS: Entire route

Western segment
- West end: I-77 at the Virginia state line near Pine Ridge
- Major intersections: US 601 in Mount Airy
- East end: US 52 in Mount Airy

Central segment
- West end: US 52 in Rural Hall
- Major intersections: US 311 in Walkertown; US 158 in Walkertown; US 421 / NC 150 in Kernersville; I-40 in Winston-Salem; US 29 in High Point; I-85 in Archdale; I-73 / US 220 in Randleman; US 64 in Asheboro
- East end: US 74 Bus. near Hamlet

Eastern segment
- West end: US 74 Alt. / US 74 Bus. in Maxton
- Major intersections: I-95 / US 301 in Lumberton
- South end: US 74 / NC 41 near Lumberton

Location
- Country: United States
- State: North Carolina
- Counties: Surry; Forsyth, Guilford, Randolph, Montgomery, Richmond; Robeson

Highway system
- Interstate Highway System; Main; Auxiliary; Suffixed; Business; Future; North Carolina Highway System; Interstate; US; State; Scenic
← NC 73	→ US 74

Interstate 74 (I-74) is a partially completed part of the Interstate Highway System that is planned to run from Davenport, Iowa, to Myrtle Beach, South Carolina. In the US state of North Carolina, I-74 currently exists in three distinct segments; from I-77 at the Virginia state line to U.S. Route 52 (US 52) near Mount Airy, from I-40 in Winston-Salem to US 220 near Ellerbe, and from US 74 and US 74 Business (US 74 Bus.) near Maxton to US 74/North Carolina Highway 41 (NC 41) near Lumberton. I-74 has an extensive concurrency with I-73 from Randleman to Ellerbe in the Piedmont. When completed, I-74 will link the cities of Mount Airy, Winston-Salem, High Point, Rockingham, Laurinburg, and Lumberton.

The 1991 Intermodal Surface Transportation Efficiency Act (ISTEA) authorized a new high priority transportation corridor from Michigan to Myrtle Beach, originally to be I-73. Conflicts over the routing of I-73 led to a compromise in 1995 that created a proposed extension of I-74 from Cincinnati, Ohio, to Myrtle Beach. The first section of I-74 was completed on August 27, 1996, between Steeds and Ulah. I-74 replaced North Carolina Highway 752 (NC 752) in 1998 near Mount Airy, and the entirety of the Mount Airy segment was completed by 2000. A segment of the Interstate was opened in 2008 between Maxton and Lumberton, creating the third segment of I-74 in North Carolina. In 2012, I-74 was extended from Ellerbe to Winston-Salem along US 311. The Piedmont segment was extended south in June 2013 and June 2018 in concurrency with I-73 and US 220 to Randleman.

== Route description ==
As of September 27, 2018, there are a total of 124.91 miles (201.02 km) of I-74, broken in three segments across the state: the Mount Airy, Piedmont Triad, and Laurinburg areas.

=== Mount Airy ===
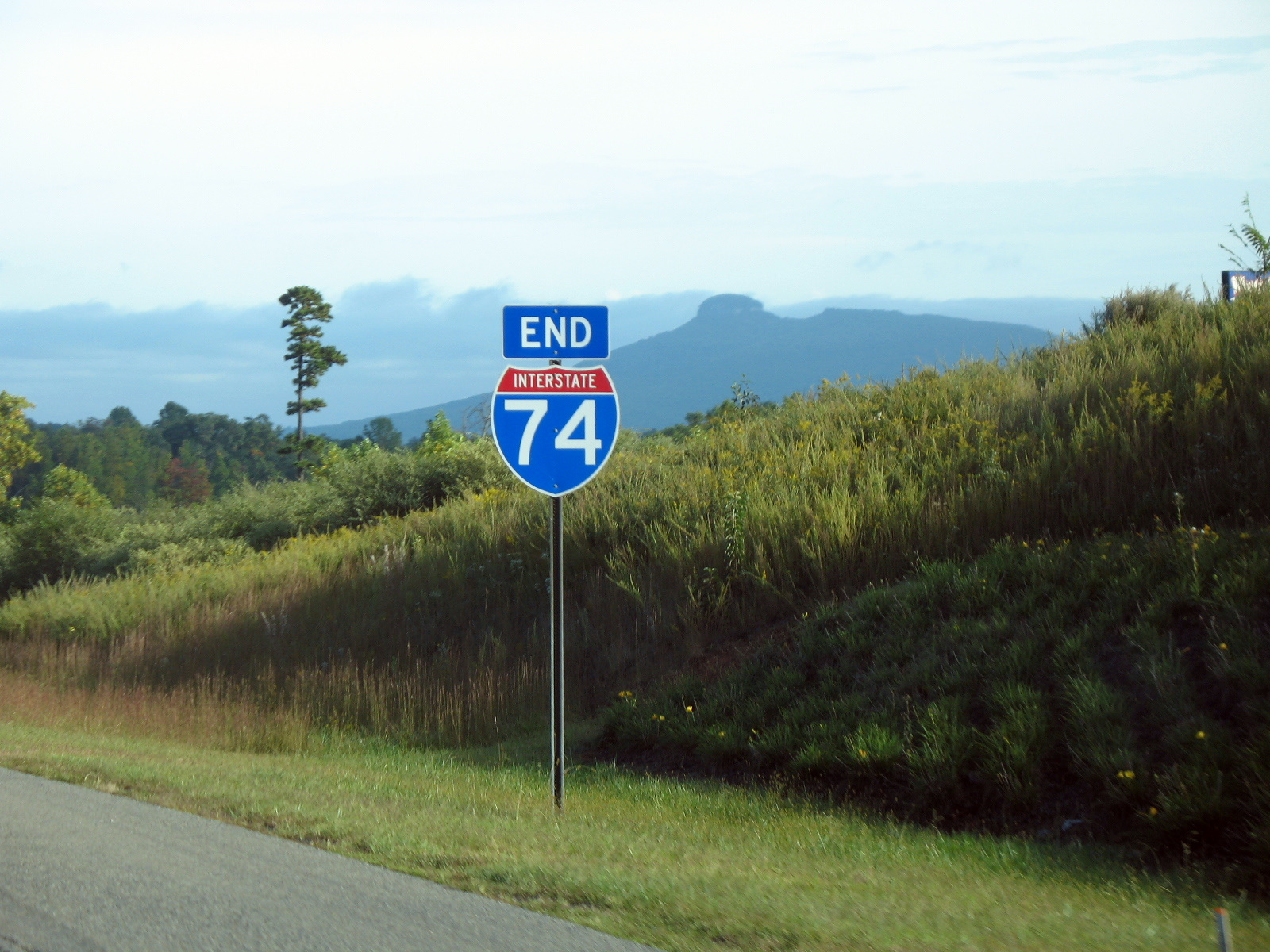
Southern terminus of the Mount Airy segment of I-74. Pilot Mountain can be seen in the background.

The first section of I-74 begins at the Virginia state line (overlapped with I-77 for approximately four miles [6.4 km]). After separation, it goes east and connects to US 52 near Mount Airy, where the first section ends.

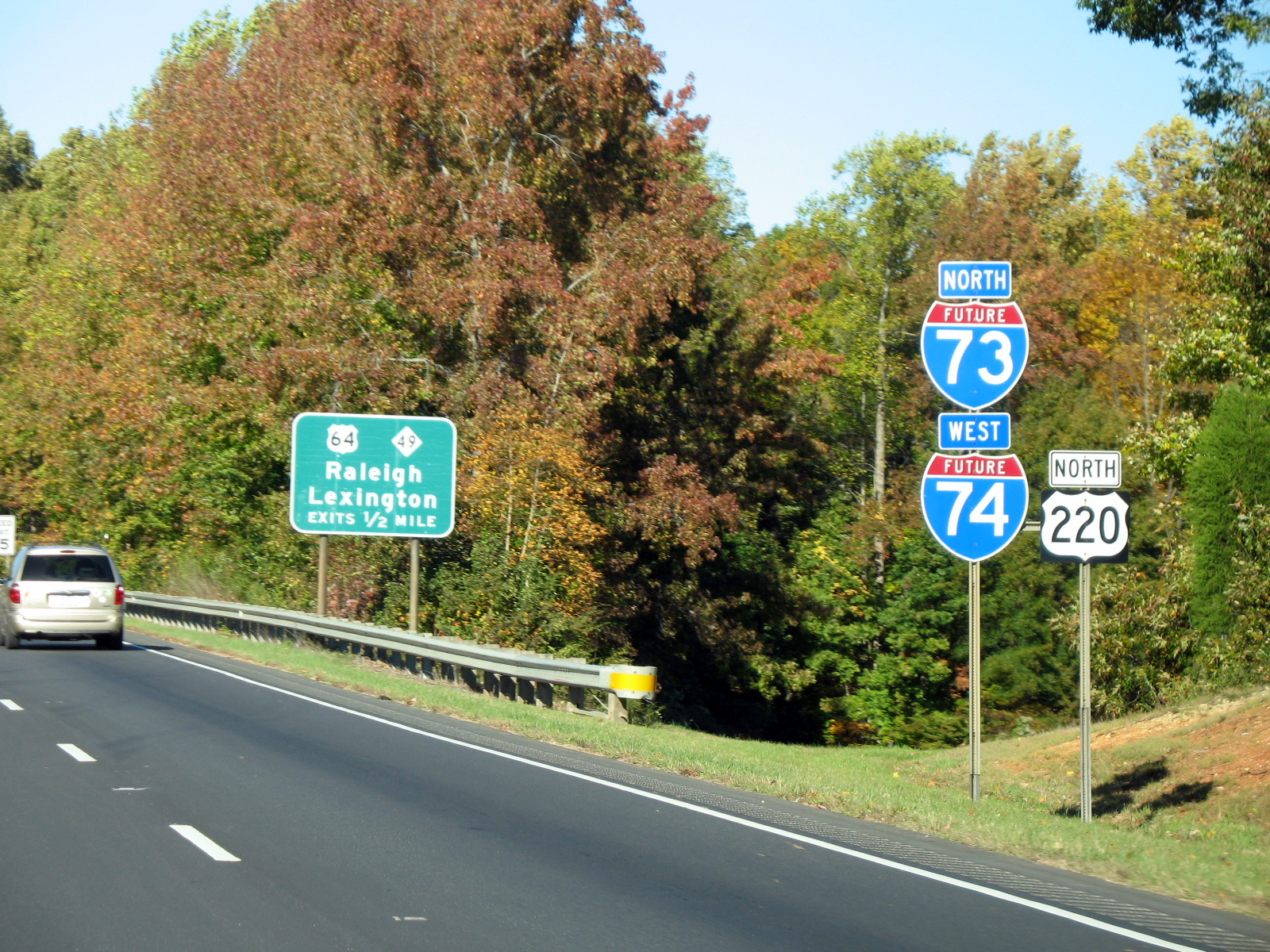
I-73/I-74/US 220 in Asheboro, in 2006. I-73 and I-74 were slated as Future Interstate Designations.

=== Piedmont Triad ===
I-74 will be routed along US 52, where the concurrency begins in southern Mount Airy, and continues in the Pilot Mountain region. The concurrent routes, then traverses the inside the municipalities of King, the outskirts of Tobaccoville, and Rural Hall. While in Rural Hall, I-74 continues along onto the eastern stretch of the Winston-Salem Northern Beltway, with US 52 diverging its concurrency. I-74 continues inside the eastern outskirts of Winston-Salem and the southern outskirts of Walkertown, with six overall lanes. The Interstate widens to eight overall lanes when entering into Kernersville, where it continues in the western outskirts of the town. I-74 is slated to travel south of its current terminus at the junction with Salem Parkway (US 421), where it will continue to travel in, mostly, the western outskirts of Kernersville, before briefly re-entering into Winston-Salem. It is inside the city, where I-74 comes to having a junction with I-40 and coming to the exit with NC 192. As of July 2026, the junction of NC 192 is where I-74 merges onto the existing stretch, while exiting Winston-Salem. It had been under a new accelerated construction plan for the Beltway, right-of-way acquisition began in 2012 and construction started in December 2014. Until construction is completed, the first and second sections of I-74 are connected with US 52 inside downtown Winston-Salem, I-40 in the southern outskirts of Downtown Winston-Salem, and, what will become the junction with I-40 and NC 192. The final section of the eastern Winston-Salem beltway is scheduled to open on September 19th, 2026, three months ahead of schedule.

NC 192 utilizes the previously-second section of I-74, which extended from the upcoming junction with I-40 and NC 192 in southeastern Winston-Salem to High Point. Until January 2019, this stretch of I-74 was concurrent with US 311. After the junction with NC 192, I-74 partially enters into the surroundings of the southern outskirts of Kernersville, before entering into High Point. While in High Point, I-74 directly connects to another section, billed as the High Point East Belt. The Interstate continues inside the eastern outskirts of the overall area of Downtown High Point, before coming to the junction with US 29 and then another junction with I-85. The stretch northwest of the High Point East Belt, was designated, despite the current lack of having 10-foot (3.0 m) shoulders. Signs were installed by August 2014.Construction completed on June 7, 2013, extended the freeway an additional eight miles (13 km) to US 220/I-73 at milemarker 86 in Randleman. The highway was originally slated to be completed by October 2012.

I-74 joins with I-73/US 220 south in Randleman going south to Asheboro. The freeway is already completed but was not allowed to be signed as a full Interstate until the segment through Asheboro was converted to Interstate Highway standards in December 2013. The fourth section of I-74 (and I-73) starts along a bypass of Asheboro where a project to convert US 220 to Interstate standards was completed, and Interstate signs went up in 2012.

I-74 continues concurrently with I-73 and US 220 between I-73 milemarkers 68 and 42 (26 mi or 42 km), the first section marked as I-74 (and I-73) in North Carolina in 1997. It continues south, bypassing the towns of Seagrove, Biscoe, and Candor. Visitor centers (completed in 2010) are located eastbound and westbound at milemarker 61. After exit 41, US 220 leaves the freeway and the route continues as I-73/I-74 for another 16 miles (26 km) toward Rockingham. Though this part of I-73/I-74 was completed in 2008 and is up to Interstate standards, it was initially signed as a future Interstate route because it had not been accepted into the Interstate Highway System by the Federal Highway Administration (FHWA) by the time it was opened, necessitating the posting of future shields. This situation was remedied on July 7, 2011, when the FHWA approved the addition of this segment to the Interstate Highway System. The route was finally signed as I-73 and I-74 in late 2013.

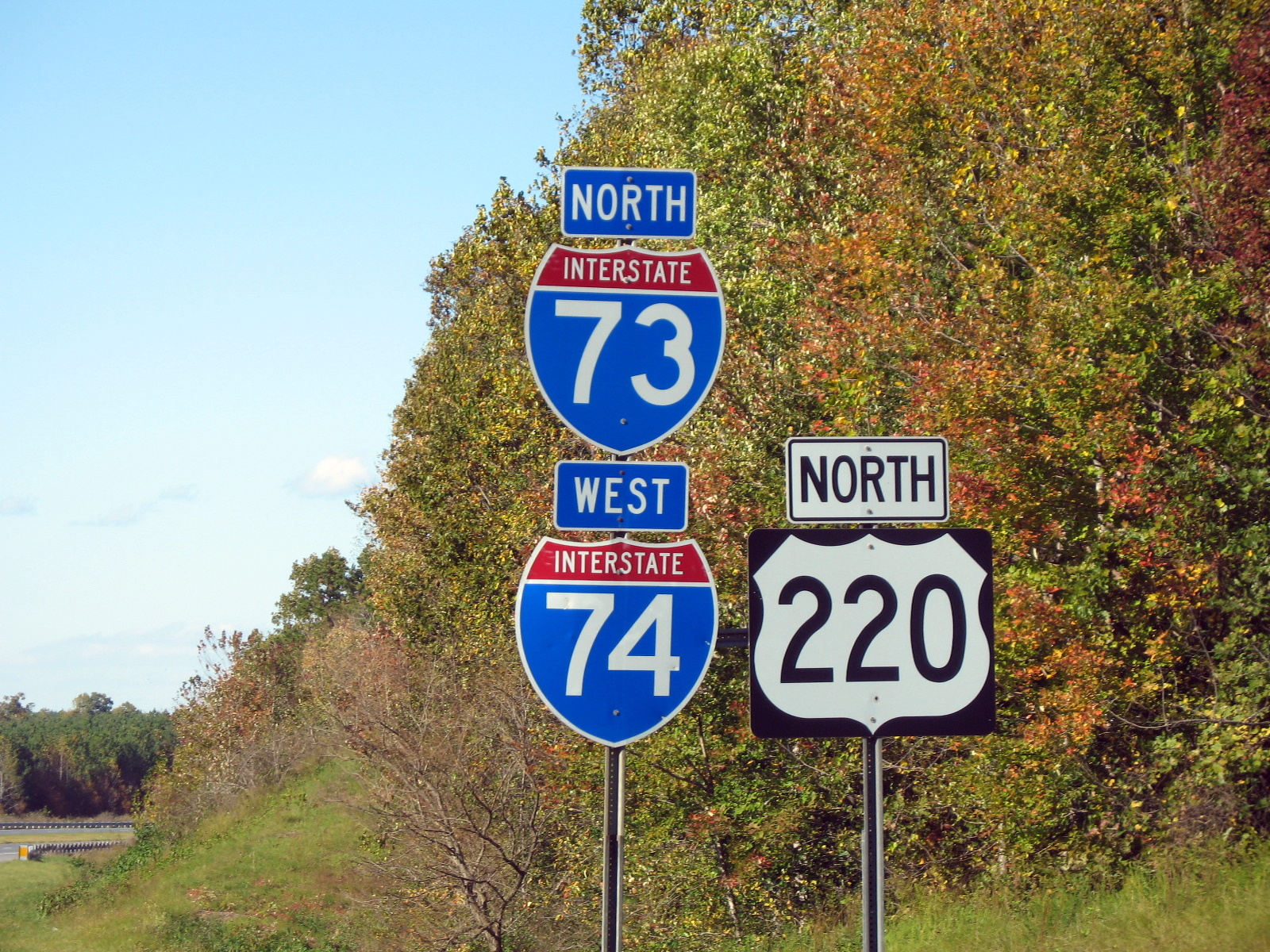
I-73/I-74/US 220, near Biscoe

In late 2018, this segment was extended by 2.91 miles (4.68 km), from US 220/Haywood Cemetery Road to a partially completed trumpet interchange on US 220 north of Rockingham. A bypass around Rockingham that connected to the US 74 bypass south of the town opened in late-January 2025.

=== Sandhills ===
The Western Rockingham Bypass, from the US 74/US 74 Bus. interchange to US 220, near Ellerbe, has all right-of-way purchases completed along the proposed route. Construction on a 3.724-mile (5.993 km) section, along US 220 (south of Ellerbe), began in March 2014; with a contracted amount of $49.8 million (equivalent to $66.6 million in 2025), it was completed in April 2018. The remaining sections of the new bypass were scheduled to start construction by late 2017; however, under reprioritization of construction projects announced in 2014, they were first removed from the list of projects to be started through 2024 then had funding restored with a construction date of 2022 in mid-2016. In January 2017, however, the project, though still funded, was delayed four years due to a low score in prioritizing projects for the 2018–2027 NCDOT State Transportation Improvement Program. On January 9, 2019, it was announced that the North Carolina State Transportation Improvement Program for 2020 to 2029 included connecting I-73 with US 74 six years sooner than planned. A $146.1-million (equivalent to $181 million in 2025) contract was awarded for the 7.2 miles (11.6 km) of four-lane freeway with "substantial completion" by late 2023. The bypass was completed and opened to traffic on January 28, 2025.

Future I-73 ends near the NC 38 exit where it is planned to be routed south into South Carolina. I-74 continues to the end of the freeway. Between Hamlet and Laurinburg is an at-grade expressway that will eventually be converted to Interstate standards. At Laurinburg, I-74 is to use the Laurinburg Bypass that was at the standard North Carolina freeway grade and signed as I-74 in 2008; however, the North Carolina Department of Transportation (NCDOT) had to remove the signage the following year when the FHWA ruled against using them until the freeway was up to Interstate standards.

The third section of I-74 is officially named the American Indian Highway; completed in 2008, this 19-mile (31 km) section stretches from Maxton to south of Lumberton, connecting with I-95/US 301. After NC 41, I-74 ends for the final time as the highway continues on as an at-grade expressway signed as US 74/Future I-74 Corridor.

=== East of I-95 ===
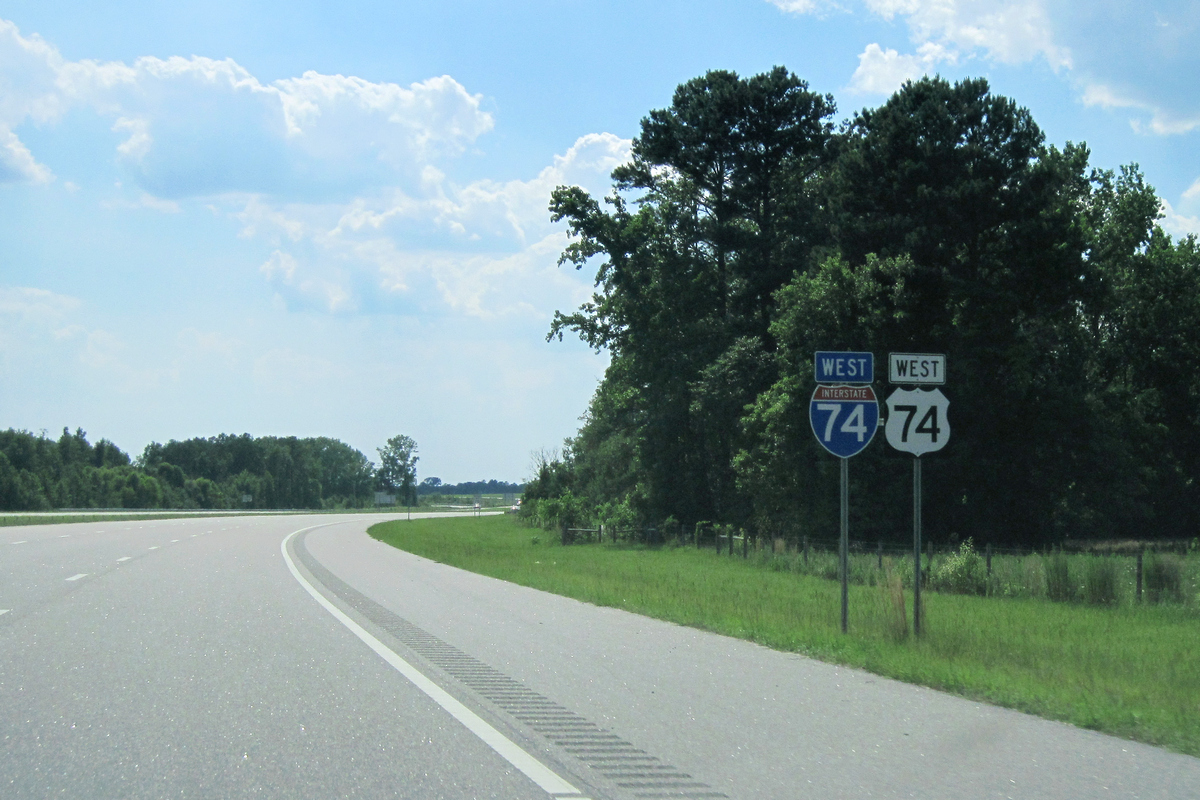
I-74/US 74 near the interchange with I-95 in Lumberton

Future I-74 is to continue to follow US 74, going through the city of Whiteville and bypassing the town of Lake Waccamaw. While there are no funded projects to convert the entire highway to Interstate standards, NCDOT is funding several smaller projects to replace intersections with interchanges for several of the remaining cross streets, including for NC 72/NC 130 north of Boardman and replacing other intersections with grade separations, such as with Old US 74 near Evergreen. An interchange at Boardman Road began construction on May 25, 2021, and opened in September 2023. Two intersections at NC 72 and at NC 130 are planned to be converted into a single interchange and that project is scheduled to begin February 2023. A third and fourth project, now combined, will build an interchange at Chauncey Town Road (SR 1735) and an overpass at Old Lake Road (SR 1740). Those projects were contracted on June 21, 2022, for an estimated cost of $44 million. This would almost build a completed freeway to the NC 211 interchange in Bolton with one exception: the at-grade intersection at US 74/Creek Road (SR 2225) will be converted to an overpass in 2025 according to the NCDOT 2020–2029 STIP.

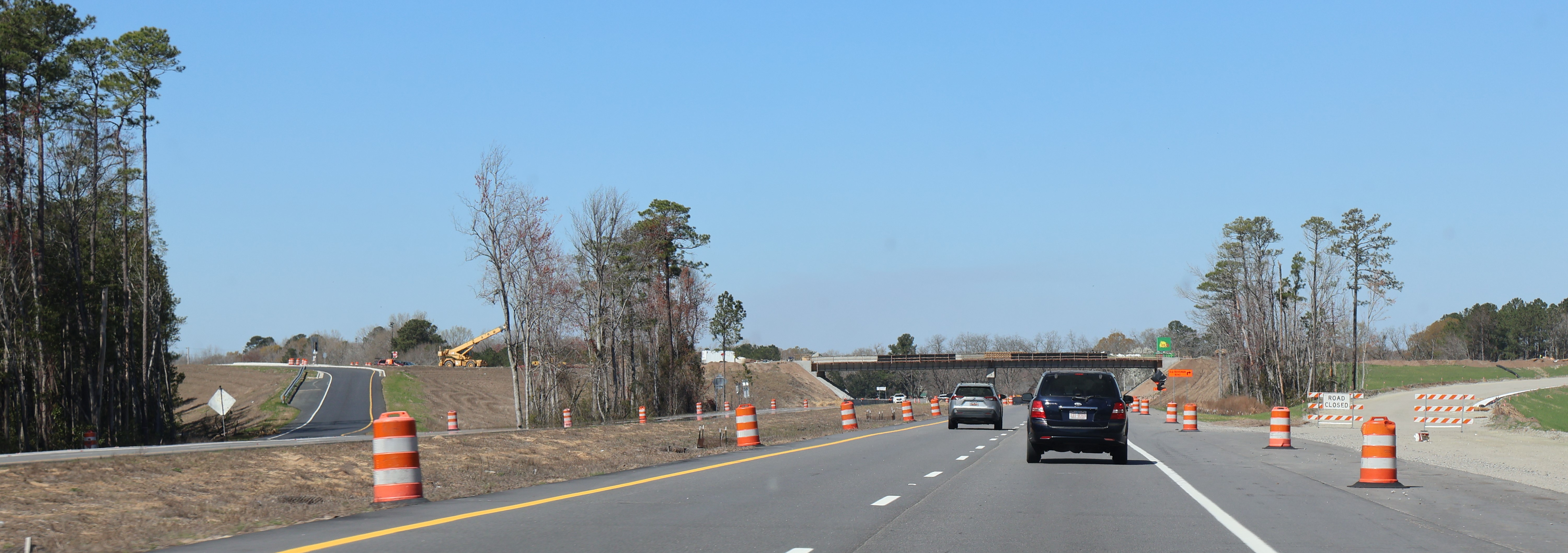
Construction of the Old Boardman Road interchange in March 2023

Before the town of Bolton, I-74 will separate from US 74 onto a proposed new freeway that will head southward, toward Shallotte, then go west on the proposed extension of South Carolina Highway 31 (SC 31; Carolina Bays Parkway) into South Carolina. This entire section of I-74 is still under a feasibility study with several possible routing options; it thus may take years before reaching South Carolina.

=== Alternate names ===
Though the highway is commonly known as I-74 throughout the state, the highway does have other known names it uses locally in areas.

- American Indian Highway—official name of the 19-mile (31 km) section of I-74 in Robeson County (milemarkers 191–213). It is named to honor the large American Indian population in Robeson County.
- Blue Star Memorial Highway—unofficial North Carolina honorary name of I-74 in Randolph County (dedicated on June 7, 2013).
- High Point East Belt—road name in Guilford County.

== History ==
ISTEA initially authorized the new high priority transportation corridor 5, tentatively known as I-73, to travel from Michigan to South Carolina. Because of several disputes to the routing, a compromise was reached in 1995, by Senator John Warner and Senator Lauch Faircloth, that extended I-74 from its then current eastern terminus of Cincinnati to overlap I-73. (Original plans called for I-73 to run through Winston-Salem and Mount Airy, but, when its alignment was shifted to serve Greensboro, North Carolina, instead, this compromise resulted in I-74 using the Winston-Salem to Mount Airy route.) In Virginia, I-74 would follow I-77 into North Carolina, while I-73 would go east to Roanoke then south along US 220 toward Greensboro. However, when I-73 crossed a border between two states, the federal law authorizing the road required that the two states agree that their sections meet. Originally, both Carolinas selected a route running south from Rockingham. North Carolina had more money to spend on roads, though, and, on May 10, 1995, the US Senate Committee on Environment and Public Works approved North Carolina's plan for I-73 to run eastward to the coast and enter South Carolina at North Myrtle Beach, South Carolina. Another compromise, between Faircloth and Senator Strom Thurmond, agreed to have both Interstates enter South Carolina: I-73 south of Rockingham and I-74 south of Wilmington, North Carolina. After later amendments and the 1998 Transportation Equity Act for the 21st Century (TEA-21), on July 25, 1998, the American Association of State Highway and Transportation Officials (AASHTO) accepted I-73/I-74 into the Interstate Highway System within the states of South Carolina, North Carolina, and Virginia.

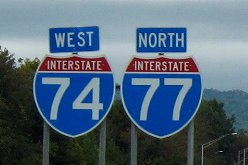
I-74/I-77 near Pine Ridge

The 12.6-mile (20.3 km) portion from south of Steeds north to south of Ulah was completed August 27, 1996, and was the first road marked as I-74 (and I-73). Future signage was also installed north to the Greensboro area. The remainder of the 26 miles (42 km) of existing and new freeway between Ulah and Candor was also signed as I-73/I-74 along US 220. In 1998, NC 752, a freeway spur of I-77 was renumbered as the segment of completed I-74, from I-77 to US 601. On June 30, 1999, the freeway was extended an additional five miles (8.0 km) to US 52, south of Mount Airy. In April 2001, I-74 was overlapped with I-77 from the Virginia state line to exit 101.

In January 2008, a 16.8-mile (27.0 km) section of freeway was completed from Candor to Ellerbe; however, it was signed Future I-73/I-74. On November 22, 2010, a 14-mile (23 km) section (known as the East Belt) was added between North Main Street in High Point to Cedar Square Road near Glenola. This also includes the 6.4-mile (10.3 km) section of new freeway that opened between I-85 Business Cedar Square Road. On October 4, 2012, I-74 was extended west from High Point to I-40, in Winston-Salem.

On June 7, 2013, I-74 extended eight miles (13 km) east onto new primary routing from Cedar Square Road to I-73/US 220, near Randleman. Continuing in concurrency with I-73/US 220, it now connects two segments of the Interstate from Winston-Salem to Candor.

=== American Indian Highway and Laurinburg Bypass ===
On September 26, 2008, a 19-mile (31 km) section of I-74/US 74 was opened between Maxton to NC 41 near Lumberton, known as the American Indian Highway. The Laurinburg Bypass was also resigned I-74/US 74 at the same time. By the middle of the following year, the Laurinburg Bypass was removed of its I-74 designation by NCDOT after a ruling from the FHWA (it was resigned as a Future I-74 Corridor). The reason was that the section, though a freeway by North Carolina standards, it was not up to Interstate standards. It was also at this same time that NCDOT fixed an exit number error along milemarkers 181 to 191.

=== North Carolina Highway 752 ===
North Carolina Highway 752
- Location: Pine Ridge
- Length: 1.0 mi (1.6 km)
- Existed: 1994–1998

North Carolina Highway 752 (NC 752) was the designation of the four-lane limited-access highway that traversed from I-77 to NC 89, near Pine Ridge. Established in 1994, it was a one-mile (1.6 km) freeway spur. In 1998, the freeway was extended to US 601 and was renumbered as I-74. Its short four-year existence was simply to be a placeholder for I-74.

=== Rockingham Bypass ===
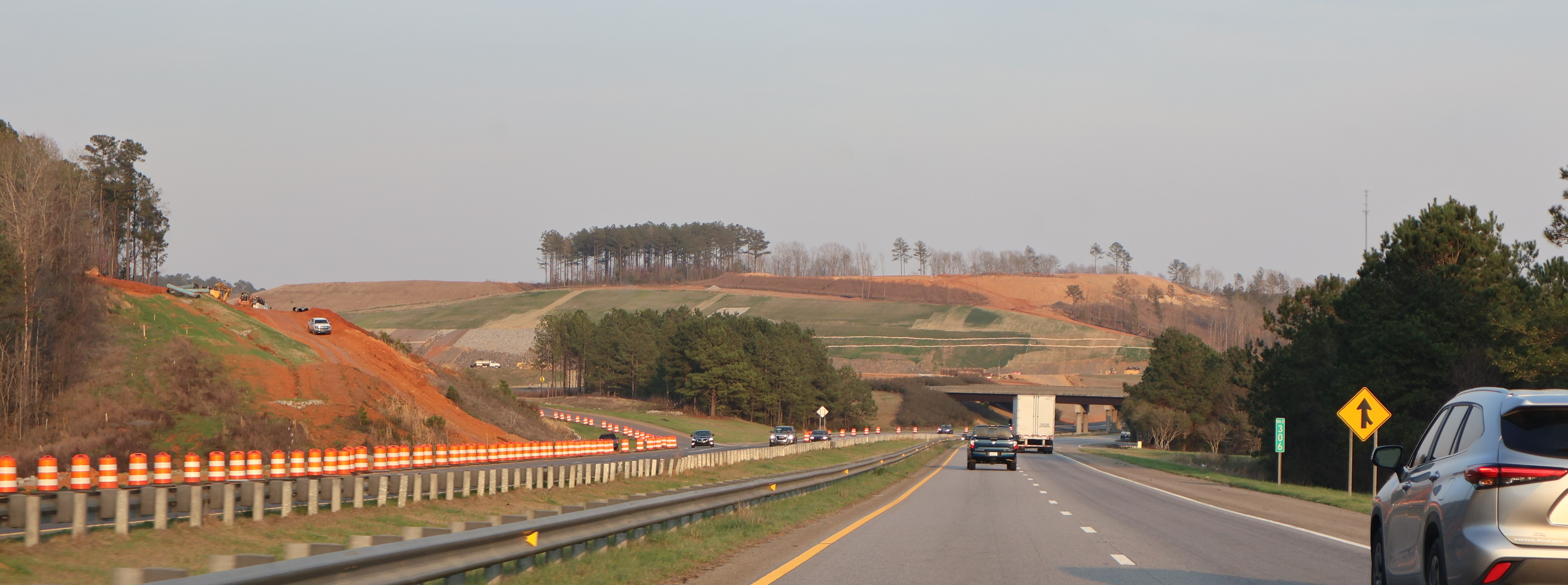
Construction of the Rockingham Bypass in March 2023

A western bypass of Rockingham begins at the partially-built trumpet interchange with US 220 where I-73 and I-74 previously ended and running southwest to the trumpet interchange between US 74 and US 74 Bus., which was reconfigured to accommodate the new bypass. Construction was initially scheduled for 2026 but was rescheduled for late 2019 and was planned to last three years, costing $146.1 million; however, the completion date was pushed back due to design changes and material shortages. Upon completion of the bypass, I-74 will be designated along its length and along US 74 around Rockingham and Hamlet, terminating east of Hamlet at US 74 Bus. The bypass will also carry I-73, which will terminate at the interchange with US 74 west of Rockingham until the section of I-73 extending into South Carolina is completed. The bypass was completed and opened to traffic on January 28, 2025.

== Future ==
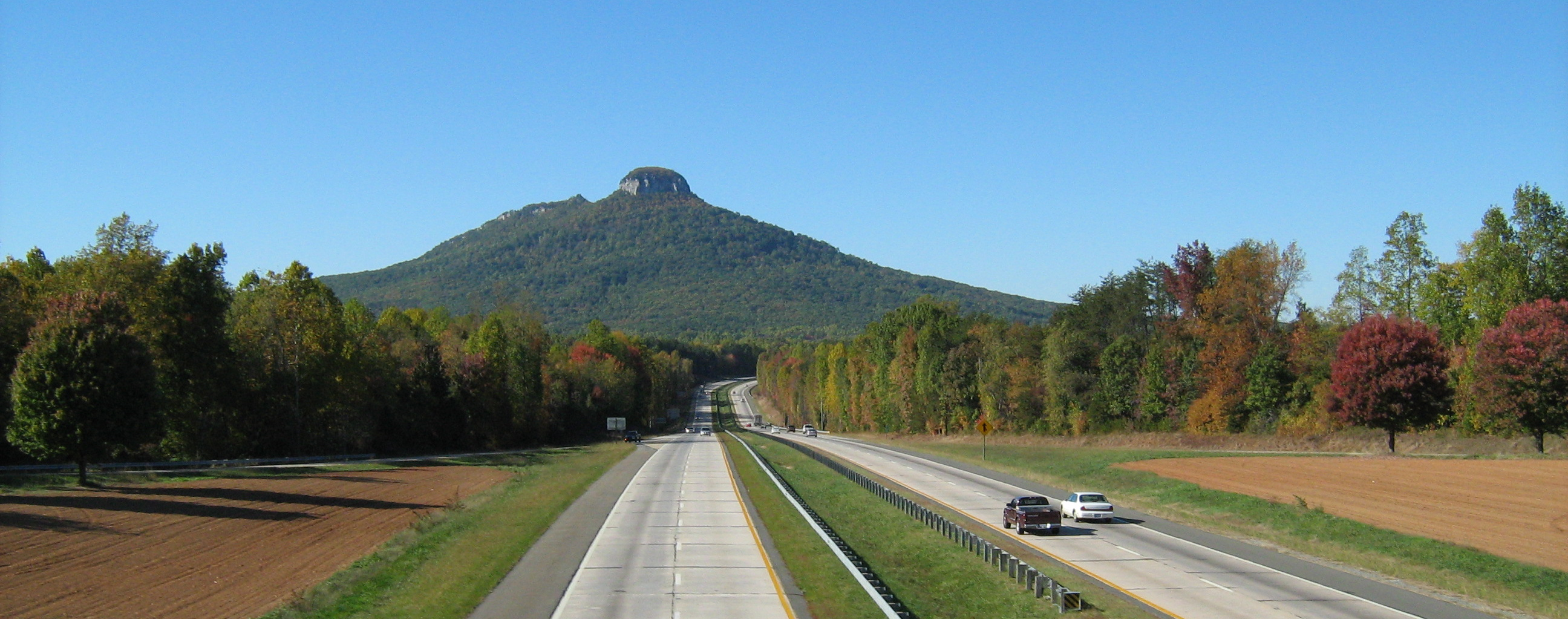
Pilot Mountain Parkway

Currently, three segments are proposed to be part of I-74 in the future. The first corridor is from Mount Airy to Rural Hall, where US 52 is planned to be converted to Interstate standards. The second is a proposed new freeway in Columbus and Brunswick counties would traverse from Whiteville to SC 31 in South Carolina. The section of US 74 from the Rockingham–Hamlet Bypass to the Laurinburg Bypass is also planned to be converted to Interstate standards. However, all of these projects are currently flagged "Scheduled for Reprioritization", with no estimated cost or date established.

=== Winston-Salem Northern Beltway ===
North Carolina Highway 74
- Location: Winston-Salem
- Length: 12.5 mi (20.1 km)
- Existed: 2020–2026

The Winston-Salem Northern Beltway is an under construction freeway loop around the North Carolina city of Winston-Salem. The western section has been designated as NC 452, which will later become I-274 when completed, and the eastern section of the beltway is designated as NC 74, which will later become part of I-74 when completed.

On September 7, 2011, North Carolina Governor Bev Perdue announced that construction of a part of the eastern leg of the beltway would begin in 2014. The section to be built connects US 158 to I-40 Bus. (now US 421/Salem Parkway). Right-of-way acquisition began in 2012 and cost $34 million (equivalent to $47.1 million in 2025); construction was estimated to cost $156 million (equivalent to $216 million in 2025). Construction on the segment, Project U-2579B, commenced in December 2014, with an anticipated completion date of November 2018. However, after delays, including an opening date of late 2019, it was finally opened to traffic on September 5, 2020.

Since then, funding has been allocated to complete the remaining sections of NC 74 between US 52 and the current I-74 (formerly cosigned with US 311), starting with the segment between US 311 and US 158, known as Project U-2579C, in October 2017. Construction on this segment began in 2018; this section has since opened to traffic effective December 23, 2020.

That same year, a contract for the segment between NC 66 and US 311, Projects U-2579D, U-2579E, and U-2579F, was awarded. Actual construction began April 2019 and opened to traffic on November 7, 2022. Next, construction on the segments between I-74 and US 421/Salem Parkway, Projects U-2579AA and U-2579AB, was scheduled to begin in 2020 and completed in 2024. However, the projects were postponed due to the cash crunch caused by the COVID-19 pandemic. The final contract was awarded on January 22, 2022, with construction beginning later that year. Its completion is now scheduled for 2026. Construction on the interchange with US 52, which began in 2019, was scheduled to be completed in mid-2023, but was since been postponed again to around Thanksgiving 2023. The southbound exit and northbound entrance from US 52 was opened to traffic on November 18, 2023; the rest of the interchange remains under construction. As of December 2024, all movements between NC 74, US 52, and NC 65 are open to traffic.

On September 19, 2026, the section between US 421 (Salem Parkway) near Kernersville and the previously existing portion of I-74 near Union Cross opened to traffic.

Signage for I-74 along the beltway began being uncovered by NCDOT in February and March 2026.

=== Lumberton to the South Carolina state line ===
NCDOT conducted a feasibility study in the early 2000s to determine how to extend I-74 from Whiteville to the South Carolina state line. The routing of the study took I-74 eastward along US 74 until it reached Bolton, where it would turn southward west of the town on a new alignment parallel to NC 211. It would then turn southwestward at Supply and travel along the US 17 corridor before reaching the South Carolina state line. The study, which was completed in 2005, recommended building a four-lane freeway with interchanges and service roads along this corridor. Since that time, several smaller projects have been completed, including several at-grade intersections being upgraded to interchanges. More recently, SCDOT and NCDOT have begun coordinating a study to extend the SC 31 (Carolina Bays Parkway) to US 17.

== Exit list ==
County	Location	mi	km	Exit	Destinations	Notes
Surry		0.0	0.0		I-77 north – Wytheville	Western terminus of I-74 at the Virginia state line
Surry	Pine Ridge	5.0	8.0	5	I-77 south – Statesville	West end of I-77 overlap
Surry	Pine Ridge	5.6	9.0	6	NC 89 – Mount Airy	
Surry		7.8	12.6	8	Red Brush Road	
Surry	Mount Airy	11.0	17.7	11	US 601 – Mount Airy, Dobson	
Surry	Mount Airy	13.0	20.9	13	Park Drive	
Surry	Mount Airy	17.9	28.8	18	US 52 north – Mount Airy	
Surry	Mount Airy	17.9	28.8	Route transition from I-74 to Future I-74		
Surry				21	Cook School Road	Existing interchanges of US 52 (conversion to Interstate standards, unfunded)
Surry				22	West Main Street – Pilot Mountain	Existing interchanges of US 52 (conversion to Interstate standards, unfunded)
Surry	Pilot Mountain			24	NC 268 – Pilot Mountain, Elkin	Existing interchanges of US 52 (conversion to Interstate standards, unfunded)
Surry				27	Pilot Knob Park Road – Pilot Mountain State Park	Existing interchanges of US 52 (conversion to Interstate standards, unfunded)
Stokes				29	Perch Road – Pinnacle	Existing interchanges of US 52 (conversion to Interstate standards, unfunded)
Forsyth	King			35	South Main Street – King, Tobaccoville	Existing interchanges of US 52 (conversion to Interstate standards, unfunded)
Forsyth	King			36	Moore-RJR Drive	Existing interchanges of US 52 (conversion to Interstate standards, unfunded)
Forsyth	Rural Hall			39	Westinghouse Road	Existing interchanges of US 52 (conversion to Interstate standards, unfunded)
Forsyth	Rural Hall			Route transition from Future I-74 to I-74		
Forsyth	Rural Hall			41B	NC 65 – Rural Hall, Bethania	Completed in October 2019 (preliminary work for Northern Beltway project)
Forsyth	Winston-Salem			41A	US 52 south – Winston-Salem	Southbound exit and northbound entrance from US 52 opened to traffic on November 19, 2023; all movements open as of December 2024. Signed as Exit 41 eastbound.
Forsyth	Stanleyville			42	NC 66 (University Parkway)	Opened on November 7, 2022
Forsyth	Winston-Salem			43	NC 8 (Germanton Road)	Opened on November 7, 2022
Forsyth	Winston-Salem			45	Baux Mountain Road	Opened on November 7, 2022
Forsyth	Walkertown			49	US 311 (New Walkertown Road)	Opened on December 23, 2020; southern terminus of US 311
Forsyth	Walkertown			50	US 158 (Reidsville Road)	Opened on September 5, 2020
Forsyth	Kernersville			53	US 421 / NC 150 (Salem Parkway) – Kernersville, Winston-Salem	Signed as exits 53A (north) [Opened on September 5, 2020] and 53B (south) westbound with C/D lane [Opened on September 19, 2026].
Forsyth				55	Kernersville Road	Opened on September 19, 2026
Forsyth	Winston-Salem			56	I-40 – Statesville, Greensboro	Opened on September 19, 2026; signed as exit 56A (I-40 east) and exit 56B (I-40 west) westbound
Forsyth	Union Cross	58.0	93.3	58	NC 192 west TO Ridgewood Road	Opened on September 19, 2026
Forsyth	Union Cross	58.9	94.8	59	Union Cross Road	
Forsyth		60.3	97.0	60	High Point Road	
Forsyth	Horneytown	63.0	101.4	63	NC 66 – Kernersville	
Guilford	High Point	65.0	104.6	65	North Main Street	
Guilford	High Point	66.4	106.9	66	Johnson Street	
Guilford	High Point	67.4	108.5	67	US 70 / NC 68 (Eastchester Drive) – High Point, Greensboro	To Piedmont Triad International Airport and High Point University
Guilford	High Point	69.0	111.0	69	Jamestown Parkway	
Guilford	High Point	70.3	113.1	70	Martin Luther King Jr. Drive	Formerly named Kivett Drive
Guilford	High Point	71.1	114.4	71A	East Green Drive	
Guilford	High Point	71.7	115.4	71B	US 29 – Thomasville, Greensboro	
Guilford	Archdale	75.2	121.0	75	I-85 – Charlotte, Greensboro	Signed as exits 75A (south) and 75B (north) westbound.
Randolph	Glenola	79.4	127.8	79	Cedar Square Road	
Randolph	Sophia	84.0	135.2	84	Old US 311 – Randleman	
Randolph	Randleman	86.8	139.7	86	I-73 north / US 220 north – Greensboro	North end of I-73/US 220 overlap; eastbound left exit
Randolph	Asheboro	87.9	141.5	79	Pineview Street	
Randolph	Asheboro	89.3	143.7	77	Spero Road	
Randolph	Asheboro	90.7	146.0	76	To US 220 Bus. north / North Fayetteville Street / Vision Drive	
Randolph	Asheboro	91.5	147.3	75	Presnell Street	
Randolph	Asheboro	92.4	148.7	74	NC 42 – Asheboro	Left exit; western terminus of NC 42
Randolph	Asheboro	94.0	151.3	72; A-B	A: US 64 Bus. east / NC 49 north – Raleigh B: US 64 Bus. west / NC 49 south – Lexington, Charlotte	To North Carolina Zoo
Randolph	Asheboro	95.1	153.0	71	McDowell Road	
Randolph				70	US 64 – Raleigh, Lexington	
Randolph		98.7	158.8	68	US 220 Bus. north / NC 134 south – Ulah, Troy	To US 220 Alt
Randolph		100.9	162.4	66	New Hope Church Road	To North Carolina Zoo
Randolph	Seagrove	105.1	169.1	61	NC 705 – Seagrove, Robbins	
Randolph		108.4	174.5	58	Black Ankle Road	
Montgomery	Ether	111.1	178.8	56	US 220 Alt. – Ether, Steeds	
Montgomery	Star	114.2	183.8	52	Spies Road – Star, Robbins	
Montgomery	Biscoe	117.4	188.9	49	NC 24 / NC 27 – Biscoe, Carthage, Troy	
Montgomery	Candor	122.4	197.0	44	NC 211 – Candor, Pinehurst	
Montgomery	Emery	125.5	202.0	41	US 220 south / US 220 Alt. north – Candor	South end of US 220 overlap
Montgomery		127.4	205.0	39	Tabernacle Church Road	
Richmond	Norman	131.4	211.5	35	Moore Street – Norman	
Richmond		133.2	214.4	33	NC 73 – Windblow, Plainview	
Richmond		136.5	219.7	30	Haywood Parker Road	
Richmond	Ellerbe	138.8	223.4	28	To NC 73 west / Millstone Road	
Richmond		141.5	227.7	25	US 220 north – Ellerbe	North end of US 220 overlap
Richmond				23	Dockery Road / Haywood Cemetery Road	
Richmond				22	US 220 south – Rockingham	South end of US 220 overlap
Richmond				20	Cartledge Creek Road	Opened January 28, 2025
Richmond				16	US 74 west / US 74 Bus. east – Monroe, Rockingham	Opened January 28, 2025; current southern end of I-73, current eastern end of I-73 overlap; western end of US 74 overlap. Signed as exits 16A (east) and 16B (west).
Richmond				308	Galestown Road – Cordova	
Richmond				311	US 1 – Rockingham, Southern Pines, Cheraw	
Richmond				316	NC 177 – Hamlet, Cheraw	
Richmond				319	NC 38 – Bennettsville	
Richmond					I-73 south – Bennettsville	Future interchange (unfunded); future east end of I-73 overlap
Richmond				320	NC 381 – Hamlet, Gibson	
Richmond				321	US 74 Bus. west – Hamlet	Westbound exit and eastbound entrance
Richmond				Route transition from I-74 to Future I-74		
Scotland	Laurel Hill				NC 144 east (Old Wire Road) – Wagram	Existing interchanges of US 74 (conversion to Interstate standards, unfunded)
Scotland		180.4	290.3	181	US 74 Bus. – Laurinburg	Existing interchanges of US 74 (conversion to Interstate standards, unfunded)
Scotland		181.2	291.6	182	NC 79 – Laurinburg, Gibson	Existing interchanges of US 74 (conversion to Interstate standards, unfunded)
Scotland	Laurinburg	182.8	294.2	183A	US 15 / US 401 / US 501 north – Fayetteville, Aberdeen, Bennettsville	Existing interchanges of US 74 / US 501 (conversion to Interstate standards, unfunded)
Scotland	Laurinburg	183.2	294.8	183B	US 15 Bus. / US 401 Bus. – Laurinburg	Existing interchanges of US 74 / US 501 (conversion to Interstate standards, unfunded)
Scotland	Laurinburg	184.1	296.3	185	US 501 south – Rowland, Myrtle Beach	Existing interchanges of US 74 / US 501 (conversion to Interstate standards, unfunded)
Scotland		185.8	299.0	186	To US 74 Bus. (Highland Road) – Laurinburg	Existing interchanges of US 74 (conversion to Interstate standards, unfunded)
Scotland		186.6	300.3	187	US 74 Bus. – Laurinburg, Maxton	Existing interchanges of US 74 (conversion to Interstate standards, unfunded)
Scotland		189.4	304.8	190	Airport Road – Laurinburg–Maxton Airport, Maxton	Existing interchanges of US 74 (conversion to Interstate standards, unfunded)
Robeson	Maxton	190.8	307.1	191	NC 71 – Maxton, Red Springs	Existing interchanges of US 74 (conversion to Interstate standards, unfunded)
Robeson	Maxton	194.0	312.2	Route transition from Future I-74 to I-74		
Robeson	Maxton	194.0	312.2	194	US 74 Alt. east / US 74 Bus. west – Maxton	Signed as 194A (west) and 194B (east) eastbound
Robeson		197.0	317.0	197	Cabinet Shop Road	
Robeson		200.7	323.0	200	NC 710 – Pembroke, Red Springs	
Robeson		203.9	328.1	203	Dew Road – Pembroke	
Robeson		207.9	334.6	207	Back Swamp Road	
Robeson	Lumberton	209.3	336.8	209	I-95 / US 301 – Lumberton, Fayetteville, Florence	Signed as 209A (south) and 209B (north); I-95 exit 13
Robeson	Lumberton	210.5	338.8	210	US 74 Alt. west	
Robeson	Lumberton	213.1	343.0	213	NC 41 – Lumberton, Fairmont	
Robeson	Lumberton	213.6	343.8	Route transition from I-74 to Future I-74		
Robeson		219.4	353.1	219	Broadridge Road (SR 2220)	Completed in November 2019; not currently signed as I-74
Robeson				223	NC 72 west / NC 130 west – Lumberton, Fairmont	Project contract let March 1, 2023; construction started on April 12, 2023; expected to be finished in December 2026; future west end of NC 130 overlap; future eastern terminus of NC 72
Columbus	Boardman			225	Old Boardman Road (SR 1506)	Interchange opened in September 2023; not currently signed as I-74
Columbus	Evergreen	228.9	368.4	228	NC 242 (Haynes Lennon Highway) – Bladenboro, Cerro Gordo	The project was let in July 2010 and construction started on August 30, 2010. The interchange opened in September 2012; not currently signed as I-74
Columbus	Chadbourn	233.7	376.1	233	US 74 Bus. east / NC 130 east / NC 410 – Chadbourn, Bladenboro	Current interchanges of US 74. Interchange completed in 2012; not yet currently signed as I-74; east end of NC 130 overlap
Columbus	Chadbourn	235.7	379.3	235	US 76 west – Chadbourn, Fair Bluff	Existing interchanges of US 74 / US 76 (conversion to Interstate standards, unfunded)
Columbus		238.5	383.8	238	Union Valley Road	Existing interchanges of US 74 / US 76 (conversion to Interstate standards, unfunded)
Columbus	Whiteville	241.4	388.5	241	US 701 – Whiteville, Clarkton	Existing interchanges of US 74 / US 76 (conversion to Interstate standards, unfunded)
Columbus	Whiteville	244.3	393.2	244	US 74 Bus. / US 76 Bus. west to NC 214 east – Whiteville, Lake Waccamaw	Existing interchanges of US 74 / US 76 (conversion to Interstate standards, unfunded)
Columbus	Hallsboro	248.0	399.1	248	Hallsboro Road (SR 1001)	Opened to traffic June 12, 2020; not currently signed as I-74
Columbus	Lake Waccamaw	252.4	406.2	252	Chauncey Town Road (SR 1735)	Roundabout interchange opened in October 2024; not currently signed as I-74
Columbus		258	415	258	NC 211 – Clarkton, Bolton, Supply	Completed in November 2024; not yet signed as I-74
Proposed Interstate 74 corridor from US 74/US 76 to US 17/South Carolina state line via Brunswick County (route unconfirmed)
1.000 mi = 1.609 km; 1.000 km = 0.621 mi: Concurrency terminus; Incomplete access; Route transition; Unopened

== See also ==
Interstate 74
Previous state: Virginia	North Carolina	Next state: South Carolina
