= North Carolina Highway 268 =

State highway in North Carolina, US

North Carolina Highway 268

Route information
- Maintained by NCDOT
- Length: 90.3 mi (145.3 km)
- Existed: 1921–present
- Tourist routes: Upper Yadkin Way

Major junctions
- West end: US 321 near Lenoir
- US 421 in Wilkesboro; US 21 in Elkin; I-77 in Elkin; US 601 in Fairview Crossroads; US 52 in Pilot Mountain
- East end: NC 89 near Moores Springs

Location
- Country: United States
- State: North Carolina
- Counties: Caldwell, Wilkes, Surry, Stokes

Highway system
- North Carolina Highway System; Interstate; US; State; Scenic
← US 264	→ NC 273

North Carolina Highway 268 (NC 268) is a primary state highway in the U.S. state of North Carolina. It connects many communities as it traverses through the northwestern North Carolina mountains and foothills.

== Route description ==
NC 268 is a predominantly rural highway that traverse along or near the Yadkin River and its tributaries, between U.S. Route 321 (US 321) and US 601, and through the Sauratown Mountains in its eastern section. Its most traversed section is between Wilkesboro and Elkin. NC 268 overlaps with one state scenic byway: the Upper Yadkin Way, between US 321 and W. Kerr Scott Dam and Reservoir.

NC 268 begins in the west at an intersection with US 321 about five miles (8.0 km) north of downtown Lenoir, Caldwell County. From its western terminus, the route heads on a curvy northeasterly path roughly following the Yadkin River. Entering Wilkes County, it follows the southern shoreline of the W. Kerr Scott Dam and Reservoir towards the county seat of Wilkesboro. Before entering downtown Wilkesboro, the route has an interchange with US 421/NC 16 and meets NC 18. Now in concurrency with NC 18, NC 268 crosses the Yadkin River and enters North Wilkesboro. In the downtown area, NC 268, along with NC 18, makes a circle via CBD Loop, Sixth Street and D Street; it connects with US 421 Business (US 421 Bus.) at the intersection of Sixth and Main Streets. West of the downtown area, US 421 Business splits and continues southwest along NC 115. About 8/10 mile (1.3 km) later, NC 18 splits and continues north towards Sparta. NC 268 continues independently east roughly paralleling the Yadkin River through the town of Ronda on its way to the Surry County line.

Just shy of the Wilkes-Surry county line near Pleasant Hill, NC 268 splits onto a business route and a bypass route. NC 268 Bypass is an expressway that passes through northern Elkin while NC 268 Bus. goes through downtown/southern Elkin. The bypass route meets US 21 Bus. (North Bridge Street) and has an interchange with US 21 Bypass before meeting Interstate 77 (I-77) at its exit 85 in northeast Elkin. NC 268 Bypass passes through the I-77 interchange, continuing east along C.C. Camp Road to rejoin its business route just west of the junction of the Mitchell River and the Yadkin River in the community of Burch.

The mainline NC 268 highway then ventures northeast from this point through the community of Little Richmond to meet US 601 at Fairview Crossroads, just south of Dobson. Passing through the crossroads, the route returns to an easterly path and crosses the Fisher River before passing through the communities of Level Cross and Pine Hill. NC 268 then crosses the Ararat River and passes to the north of Pilot Mountain to meet US 52 (Future I-74) in the town of Pilot Mountain. NC 268 passes through the town and crosses the county line into Stokes County. The final eastern segment of NC 268 is a curvy one through the Sauratown Mountains, crossing NC 66 to end at NC 89 north of Moores Springs and northwest of Danbury.

=== Dedicated and memorial names ===
NC 268 features several dedicated bridges and stretches of highway throughout its route.

- Charles A. Suddreth – Official North Carolina name of NC 268 between US 321 and Buffalo Cove Road (SR 1504).
- John W. Brown Highway – Official North Carolina name of NC 268 around Ronda.
- Theodore Roosevelt Van Eaton Memorial Bridge – Official North Carolina name of bridge over US 21 in Elkin (approved: September 11, 2003).

== History ==
NC 268 is an original state highway; that traversed from NC 26 in Elkin to NC 80 in Fairview Crossroads. In 1930, NC 268 was extended east on new primary routing to US 121/NC 66 in Pilot Mountain. In 1931, NC 268 was extended west on new primary routing to end at NC 18 in North Wilkesboro. In 1933, NC 268 was extended west again along NC 18 into Wilkesboro, then on new routing to US 321/NC 17 in Patterson. In 1938, NC 268 was rerouted to run directly between Roaring River and Ronda leaving behind secondary roads that looped further north. Between 1939-1944, NC 268 was rerouted in Elkin to its current routing, leaving behind Elk Spur Street/West Market Street. In 1940, NC 268 was rerouted further south to connect with NC 18, in North Wilkesboro, its old alignment became NC 268A.

In 1941, NC 268 was extended west to connect with NC 90 near Lenoir replacing part of and overlapping US 321. In 1952, NC 268 was truncated to its current western terminus at US 321, leaving behind Valway Road (SR 1352). In 1953, NC 268 was extended east along US 52A in Pilot Mountain, then placed onto new primary routing to NC 66.

In 1962, NC 268 was rerouted south of what became W. Kerr Scott Dam and Reservoir; a majority of the former route was abandoned and submerged by the reservoir, only Old NC 268 (SR 1145) remains. Also in 1962, NC 268 was rerouted in downtown North Wilkesboro, with eastbound along Tenth Street, A Street and D Street, and westbound along D Street and Tenth Street; which removed its routing along B Street. In 1978, NC 268 was rerouted again in downtown North Wilkesboro to its current alignment with eastbound along CBD Loop and Sixth Street and westbound along Sixth Street, "D" Street and CBD Loop.

In 2002, NC 268 was placed on new bypass routing north of Elkin; its old alignment becoming NC 268 Business. In 2003, NC 268 was extended from NC 66 to its current eastern terminus with NC 89.

== Future ==
Two future projects impact NC 268 that may reroute the highway. The first is in Wilkes County, where a proposed multi-lane northern bypass would connect the NC 18/NC 268A interchange and go west to US 421. The second, located in Pilot Mountain, will place NC 268 onto new bypass road (two or multi-lane) south of the downtown area. Both projects are currently unfunded.

== Junction list ==
County	Location	mi	km	Destinations	Notes
Caldwell		0.0	0.0	US 321 – Lenoir, Boone	
Wilkes	Wilkesboro	28.0	45.1	US 421 / NC 16 – Winston-Salem, Boone	
Wilkes	Wilkesboro	28.8	46.3	NC 18 south (Cherry Street) – Lenoir, Taylorsville	South end of NC 18 overlap
Wilkes	North Wilkesboro	30.8	49.6	US 421 Bus. north (Sixth Street)	North end of US 421 Bus. overlap
Wilkes	North Wilkesboro	31.3	50.4	US 421 Bus. / NC 115 south – Statesville	South end of US 421 Bus. overlap
Wilkes	North Wilkesboro	32.1	51.7	NC 18 north – Sparta	North end of NC 18 overlap
Wilkes	North Wilkesboro	32.4	52.1	NC 268A west to NC 18 north	Hidden NC 268A designation
Wilkes	Roaring River	40.7	65.5	To US 421 / Roaring River Road	
Wilkes	Ronda	44.9	72.3	To US 421 / Clingman Road – Clingman	
Wilkes	Elkin	49.2	79.2	NC 268 Bus. east (Austin Traphill Road)	
Surry	Elkin	51.1	82.2	US 21 Bus. (Bridge Street)	
Surry	Elkin	52.0	83.7	US 21 – Statesville, Sparta	
Surry	Elkin	53.0	85.3	I-77 – Statesville, Wytheville, Mount Airy	
Surry		56.1	90.3	NC 268 Bus. west	
Surry	Fairview Crossroads	61.7	99.3	US 601 – Yadkinville, Mount Airy	
Surry	Pilot Mountain	75.6	121.7	US 52 – Winston-Salem, Mount Airy	
Stokes		86.5	139.2	NC 66 south – Rural Hall	South end of NC 66 overlap
Stokes		86.6	139.4	NC 66 north – Westfield	North end of NC 66 overlap
Stokes		90.3	145.3	NC 89 – Danbury, Francisco	
1.000 mi = 1.609 km; 1.000 km = 0.621 mi: Concurrency terminus

== Special routes ==
=== North Wilkesboro alternate route ===
North Carolina Highway 268A
- Location: North Wilkesboro, North Carolina
- Length: 0.18 mi (290 m)
- Existed: 1940–present

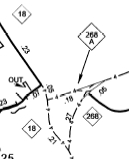
NCDOT county map (revised 2009) identifying NC 268A

North Carolina Highway 268 Alternate (NC 268A) was established in 1940 as a renumbering of NC 268. This short 0.18-mile-long (0.29 km) route serves as a cutoff between NC 268 and NC 18; it is four-lanes throughout. Signage at the location only indicate it as part of NC 268; however, NCDOT county maps identify it specifically as NC 268A.

=== Elkin business loop ===
North Carolina Highway 268 Business
- Location: Elkin, North Carolina
- Length: 7.8 mi (12.6 km)
- Existed: 2002–present

North Carolina Highway 268 Business (NC 268 Bus) was established in 2002 as a renumbering of NC 268 through downtown Elkin, via Elkin Highway, Bridge Street (with short concurrency with US 21 Bus.), Market Street and Main Street.

== See also ==
- North Carolina Bicycle Route 4 - Concurrent with NC 268 from Toms Creek Road to its western NC 66 intersection around Pilot Mountain
