= North Carolina Highway 704 =

State highway in North Carolina, US

North Carolina Highway 704
- Wesley D. Webster Highway

Route information
- Maintained by NCDOT
- Length: 38.7 mi (62.3 km)
- Existed: 1930–present

Major junctions
- West end: NC 89 near Francisco
- US 220 / US 311 in Madison
- East end: NC 65 near Wentworth

Location
- Country: United States
- State: North Carolina
- Counties: Stokes, Rockingham

Highway system
- North Carolina Highway System; Interstate; US; State; Scenic
← US 701	→ NC 705

North Carolina Highway 704 (NC 704) is a primary state highway in the U.S. state of North Carolina. The highway connects Madison with northern Stokes County and the Wentworth-Reidsville area.

== Route description ==
NC 704 is a mostly two-lane rural highway that traverses 38.7 miles (62.3 km). Beginning at NC 89, near Francisco, east through Madison, to NC 65 near Wentworth. This highway connects the communities of Campbell, Coleville, Sandy Ridge, Delta, Prestonville and Pleasantville.

All of NC 704 is dedicated to Wesley D. Webster who was a state politician from Madison. The name was established by the General Assembly through a resolution approved on July 20, 1984.

== History ==
Established in 1930 with its original primary routing from NC 708, near Madison (junction located where Ellisboro and Bald Hill Loop Roads once intersect), and US 170/NC 70, in Greensboro (junction located where Battleground Avenue, Elm Street and Summit Avenue all converged). In 1932, US 411 was assigned along all of NC 704. In 1933, NC 704 was extended northwest to NC 891, in Coleville; replacing a part of NC 708, a brief concurrency with US 311 and new primary routing west of Madison. Also in Greensboro, NC 704 was rerouted onto Wendover Avenue to Elm Street. In 1934, all of NC 704 was removed from US 411, which by end of year was replaced by US 220. In 1935, NC 704 was extended to its current eastern terminus at US 158 (today's NC 65), near Wentworth, replacing nearly all of NC 708. In 1936, NC 704 was extended to its current western terminus at NC 89, near Francisco; reclaiming former primary routing of NC 893 and later NC 661 in the 1920s, west of NC 109 (NC 891's successor, eventually becoming NC 8) in Coleville.

=== North Carolina Highway 708 ===
North Carolina Highway 708
- Location: Madison–Bakers Crossroads, NC
- Length: 7.6 mi (12.2 km)
- Existed: 1922–1935

North Carolina Highway 708 (NC 708) was established in 1922, traveling from NC 897 in Madison, east through Wentworth, to NC 70 in Reidsville; hitting its highest elevation at the start with 20.4 miles (32.8 km). In 1923, NC 708 was truncated at Bakers Crossroads, its eastern section replaced by NC 65. In 1933, NC 708 north of Ellisboro Road/Bald Hill Loop was replaced by NC 704, shrinking the route down to just 7.6 miles (12.2 km). In 1935, the rest of NC 708 was replaced by NC 704, which was also realigned onto new road north of Bakers Crossroads.

=== North Carolina Highway 893 ===
North Carolina Highway 893
- Location: Francisco–VA State Line
- Length: 7.5 mi (12.1 km)
- Existed: 1922–1923

North Carolina Highway 893 (NC 893) was established in 1922 as a new primary route from NC 89 near Francisco, northeast to the Virginia state line. In 1923, it was renumbered as part of NC 661; today it is part of NC 704, with a small snippet to NC 8.

== Junction list ==
County	Location	mi	km	Destinations	Notes
Stokes		0.0	0.0	NC 89 – Francisco, Danbury	
Stokes	Coleville	7.2	11.6	NC 8 – Stuart, Danbury	
Stokes		16.0	25.7	NC 770 east – Stoneville	
Stokes	Prestonville	18.5	29.8	NC 772 south – Walnut Cove	
Rockingham	Madison	28.0	45.1	US 220 Bus. north (Highway Street) – Mayodan	North end of US 220 Bus overlap
Rockingham	Madison	29.3	47.2	US 311 south (Academy Street) – Walnut Cove	South end of US 311 overlap
Rockingham	Madison	30.7	49.4	US 220 / US 311 north – Greensboro, Stoneville	North end of US 311 and south end of US 220 Bus overlap
Rockingham		38.7	62.3	NC 65 – Stokesdale, Reidsville	
1.000 mi = 1.609 km; 1.000 km = 0.621 mi: Concurrency terminus

== See also ==
- North Carolina Bicycle Route 4 - Concurrent with NC 704 from Delta to NC 770
