= North Carolina Highway 89 =

State highway in North Carolina, US

North Carolina Highway 89

Route information
- Maintained by NCDOT
- Length: 61.3 mi (98.7 km)
- Existed: 1921–present
- Tourist routes: Hanging Rock Scenic Byway

Major junctions
- West end: SR 89 at the Virginia state line near Lowgap
- I-77 near Mount Airy; I-74 near Mount Airy; US 52 in Mount Airy
- East end: US 311 in Walnut Cove

Location
- Country: United States
- State: North Carolina
- Counties: Surry, Stokes

Highway system
- North Carolina Highway System; Interstate; US; State; Scenic
← NC 88	→ NC 90

North Carolina Highway 89 (NC 89) is a 61.3-mile-long (98.7 km) primary state highway in the U.S. state North Carolina including Mount Airy and Danbury. The entire route spans only two counties in the state: Surry and Stokes. It can be accessed from the Blue Ridge Parkway via Virginia's State Route 89 (the highway that continues from NC 89's western terminus) or an interchange with NC 18 which intersects NC 89 near its western terminus. Interstates 74 and 77 both intersect NC 89 west of Mount Airy.

== Route description ==
NC 89 begins as a continuation of Virginia State Route 89 (SR 89) at the state line and heads south. It intersects NC 18's eastern terminus before making a U-turn to the north and then continuing southeast. The route passes through Lowgap and Beulah before interchanging at the junctions with Interstate 77 and Interstate 74. It then continues east and enters Mt. Airy, interchanging US 52 as West Independence Boulevard. It then turns to the south on South Renfro Street, running concurrent with US 52 Bus. for 1.7 miles (2.7 km). NC 89 then continues east on Westfield Road, passing through Sheltontown, Woodville, and Westfield before intersecting the northern terminus of NC 66 in Johnstown. The route then continues to the northeast and then intersecting the western terminus of NC 704 in Francisco before heading southeast. It then intersects the eastern terminus of NC 268 before crossing the Dan River and then becoming concurrent with NC 8, passing through Danbury. About 3.0 miles (4.8 km) southeast of Danbury, NC 89 splits from NC 8 and continues towards Walnut Cove. As it enters town, it reaches its eastern terminus at US 311 while the road continues south carrying the US 311 designation through downtown.

== History ==
NC 89 is an original North Carolina state highway, established in 1921 by the North Carolina State Highway Commission. The highway began at NC 80 in Mount Airy and ran east to Francisco where it intersected NC 661. The highway then turned southeast, travelled through Danbury and Walnut Cove, before ending at NC 897 in Walkertown. At the time of establishment, NC 89 travelled through three counties, Surry County, Stokes County, and Forsyth County. By 1924, much of the route was considered a topsoil, sand-clay, and gravel road. Two exceptions existed, a segment north of Danbury, which was unimproved, and the segment in Forsyth County, which was paved. By 1926, NC 89 was removed from its routing between Walnut Cove and Walkertown, eliminating the highway in Forsyth County. The former routing became part of an extended NC 77. NC 89 was paved between its western terminus at NC 80 and NC 66 near Mount Airy, and between NC 891 near Danbury and NC 77 in Walnut Cove. The formerly unimproved section of road northwest of Danbury was upgraded to a topsoil, sand-clay, and gravel road by 1926 as well. Between 1929 and 1930, NC 89 was extended west to the Virginia state line. The highway was routed west of Mount Airy through Low Gap before ending at Virginia State Route 117 (SR 117) at the state line which continued toward Galax.

On May 31, 1962, NC 89 was placed onto split streets in Mount Airy. Whereas the road had previously used South Main Street for both traffic directions, the northbound lanes were placed onto Cherry Street, Renfro Street, and Pine Street. The southbound lanes of NC 89 continued to use South Main Street. All lanes of traffic were moved onto Renfro Street and Pine Street on October 1, 1970. The most recent change to the routing of NC 89 occurred on June 27, 1997 when the North Carolina Department of Transportation (NCDOT) removed the highway from Pine Street between Independence Boulevard and Renfro Street. Instead, NC 89 was rerouted to follow Independence Boulevard east to Renfro Street and then follow Renfro Street through downtown Mount Airy.

== Major intersections ==
County	Location	mi	km	Destinations	Notes
Surry	Lowgap	0.0	0.0	SR 89 north – Galax	Virginia state line
Surry	Lowgap	0.3	0.48	NC 18 south	Northern terminus of NC 18
Surry	Beulah	12.5– 12.7	20.1– 20.4	I-77 – Wytheville, VA, Statesville	Exit 100 (I-77)
Surry	Pine Ridge	13.7– 14.0	22.0– 22.5	I-74 to I-77 north – Wytheville, VA, Winston-Salem	Exit 6 (I-74)
Surry	Mount Airy	20.2– 20.3	32.5– 32.7	US 52 (Andy Griffith Parkway) / Pine Street – Winston-Salem	Interchange
Surry	Mount Airy	21.2	34.1	US 52 Bus. north (Renfro Street) / Independence Boulevard	Northern end of US 52 Bus. concurrency
Surry	Mount Airy	21.4	34.4	NC 103 east (Pine Street)	Western terminus of NC 103
Surry	Mount Airy	22.8	36.7	US 52 Bus. south (Main Street)	Southern end of US 52 Bus. concurrency
Stokes	Johnstown	35.7– 35.9	57.5– 57.8	NC 66 south – Rural Hall	Northern terminus of NC 66; Y intersection
Stokes	Francisco	41.4	66.6	NC 704 east – Sandy Ridge	Western terminus of NC 704
Stokes		46.8	75.3	NC 268 west (Lynchburg Road)	Eastern terminus of NC 268
Stokes		49.6	79.8	NC 8 north – Lawsonville	Northern end of NC 8 concurrency
Stokes	Meadows	56.2	90.4	NC 8 south / Dodgetown Road	Southern end of NC 8 concurrency
Stokes	Walnut Cove	61.3	98.7	US 311 (Main Street) – Walnut Cove, Madison	
1.000 mi = 1.609 km; 1.000 km = 0.621 mi: Concurrency terminus

== See also ==
- North Carolina Bicycle Route 4
