= Bottom, North Carolina =

Unincorporated community in North Carolina, US

Coordinates: 36°28′30″N 80°46′26″W

Bottom is an unincorporated community in the Stewarts Creek Township of northern Surry County, North Carolina, United States. The community is more commonly known as Beulah locally and is centered on the intersection of Beulah Road/Beulah Church Road and North Carolina Highway 89 (West Pine Street).

The origin of the name "Bottom" is obscure.
