= Thomas A. Crews House =

Historic house in North Carolina, United States

- U.S. National Register of Historic Places
- Location within North Carolina Location within the United States
- Location: 4997 Main St., Walkertown, North Carolina
- Coordinates: 36°10′30″N 80°9′6″W
- Area: 7.2 acres (2.9 ha)
- Built: 1891
- Architectural style: Late Victorian, Vernacular, Queen Anne Influence
- NRHP reference No.: 93000316
- Added to NRHP: April 26, 1993

Thomas A. Crews House is a historic home located at Walkertown, Forsyth County, North Carolina. It was built 1891, and is a two-story, vernacular Queen Anne style frame dwelling, enlarged to its present size in 1911. It features a one-story, shed-roofed, wrap-around porch. Also on the property are the contributing brick wash house (1891), a frame smokehouse (1891), barn (1891), pump house, chicken house, wood shed, equipment shed or "gear house," and the 65 foot brick smokestack of the former Crews Tobacco Factory (1891).

It was listed on the National Register of Historic Places in 1993.
