= Gap, North Carolina =

Gap
- Unincorporated community
- Location within the state of North Carolina
- Coordinates: 36°23′12″N 80°19′31″W
- Country: United States
- State: North Carolina
- County: Stokes
- Time zone: UTC-5 (Eastern (EST))
  - Summer (DST): UTC-4 (EDT)
- ZIP codes: 27021 & 27053

Gap is an unincorporated community in Stokes County, North Carolina, United States, approximately 5 miles WSW of Danbury, North Carolina, near Hanging Rock State Park, on North Carolina State Highway 66.
