= U.S. Route 311 =

Highway in the United States

U.S. Route 311
- US 311 highlighted in red; former segments highlighted in blue

Route information
- Length: 59.2 mi (95.3 km)
- Existed: 1927–present

Major junctions
- South end: I-74 in Walkertown, NC
- US 220 near Madison, NC
- North end: US 58 / SR 1260 in Danville, VA

Location
- Country: United States
- States: North Carolina, Virginia
- Counties: NC: Forsyth, Stokes, Rockingham; VA: Pittsylvania

Highway system
- United States Numbered Highway System; List; Special; Divided
← NC 308	NC	→ US 321
← SR 310	VA	→ SR 311

U.S. Route 311 (US 311) is a United States Numbered Highway that runs for 59.2 miles (95.3 km) from Walkertown, North Carolina to Danville, Virginia. It connects the municipalities of Madison and Eden. The route runs northeast from Walkertown to Danville. By the numbering convention, it is an auxiliary route of US 11, however except for a brief period shortly after the route was established, it has not connected to its parent route.

US 311 begins in Walkertown, at I-74 (exit 49) northeast of Winston-Salem. Starting in the vicinity of Madison, US 311 follows a number of different North Carolina state highways in short succession along with another major US Highway, US 220 before crossing the Virginia line. In Virginia, the route terminates shortly after crossing the border at the interchange with US 58 (Danville Expressway) in Danville.

In May 2018, North Carolina applied for, and received, permission from the American Association of State Highway and Transportation Officials (AASHTO) to remove US 311 from the southernmost 37 miles (60 km) of the route, being mostly redundant to Interstate 74 (I-74), bringing it to a routing from Winston-Salem to Danville. However, some US 311 signage remains on its former southernmost segment near Randleman. In September 2024, North Carolina once again applied for, and received, permission from AASHTO on October 30, 2024 to remove US 311 from the now southernmost 5 miles (8.0 km) of the route to the newly-built Winston-Salem Northern Beltway, now part of I-74.

== Route description ==
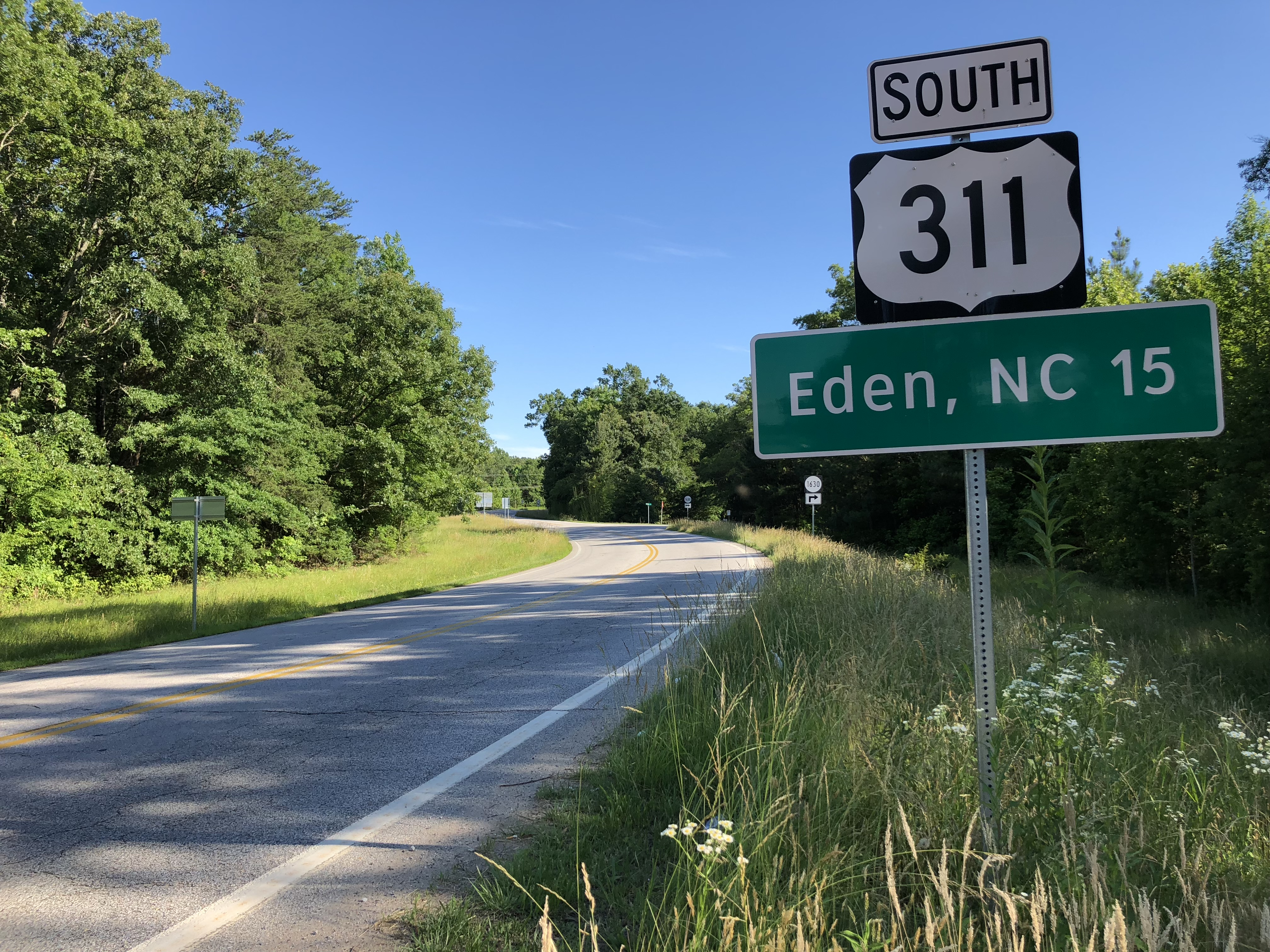
View south at the north end of US 311 at US 58 Bus. just west of Danville, Virginia

US 311 begins at exit 49 at the Winston-Salem Northern Beltway along New Walkertown Road, part of I-74. It travels northeast and intersects NC 66 at the edge of Walkertown, which motorists can use to connect to nearby shopping centers situated along US 158 (Reidsville Road). Shortly after, US 311 then turns to follow Harley Drive and turns again to follow Main Street through town. North of Walkertown, the road takes the local name of Walnut Cove Road. At the southern edge of the town of Walnut Cove, NC 65 joins for a short 0.7-mile (1.1 km) concurrency. At the northern boundary of Walnut Cove, NC 89 has its terminus at US 311, and the highway turns northeast. NC 775 terminates at US 311 near Pine Hall and entering the town of Madison, US 311 takes an easterly route as Academy Street, meeting up with NC 704 along the way. East of Madison, it leaves NC 704 and joins with the Future I-73/US 220 by-pass, both routes traveling due north in a short concurrency to Mayodan. In Mayodan, US 311 then leaves the US 220 freeway, and proceeds easterly again, along NC 135 towards Eden. Three other NC highways join with US 311 in Eden in short succession: NC 770, NC 87 and NC 14, then the four joined routes cross the Dan River along Van Buren Street in Eden. NC 14/NC 87 continues north on Van Buren, while US 311 exits Van Buren Street on a grade-separated interchange onto Meadow Road near the Eden Mall, heading northeast into a rural area before crossing into Virginia.

After the passing through the small communities of Berry Hill and Buford, it meets its northern terminus at an interchange with US 58 (Danville Expressway) in Danville.

The J.J. Webster Highway is the official North Carolina name of US 311/NC 135 from Mayodan to Eden.

== History ==
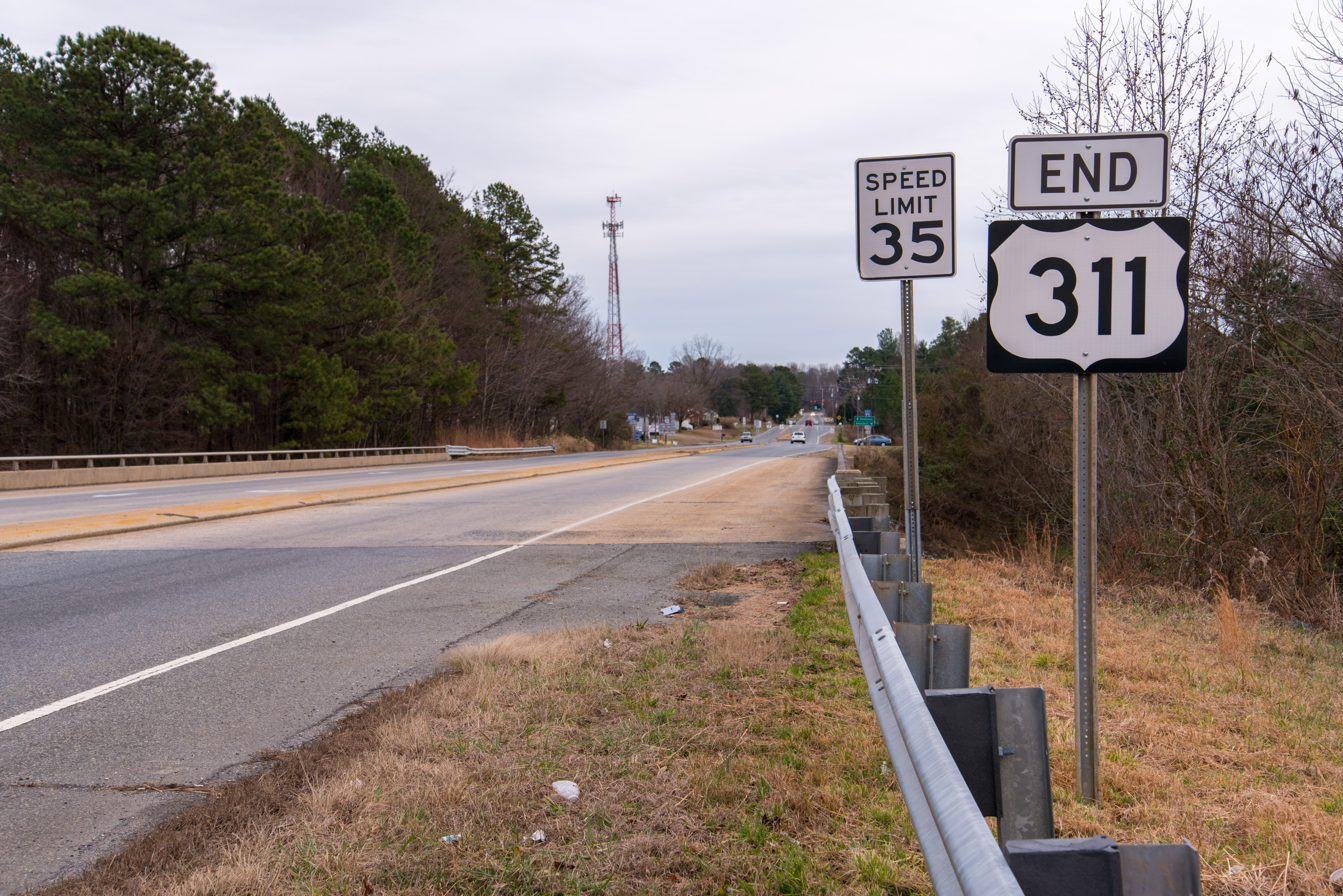
Former southern terminus in Randleman

Established as an original U.S. Highway in 1927, it originally traversed from West End, through Asheboro, High Point, Winston-Salem, Madison, and Stoneville, before entering Virginia and continuing to Roanoke, where it reached its parent route, US 11. The alignment followed part of what was NC 70 and all of NC 77, both of which were decommissioned in 1934.

In 1933, US 311 was extended south through Pinehurst, Aberdeen, and Laurinburg, to Rowland, overlapping NC 241. A year later, US 220 was established and replaced US 311 south of Asheboro and north of Madison, severing the connection with its parent route. Sections further south were replaced by NC 2 (today's NC 211) and US 501. Later in 1966, US 311 was truncated in Randleman; by 1973, US 311 southern terminus was moved to US 220 Bypass, in Randleman.

By 1952, US 311 was rerouted west of downtown Winston-Salem, following Waughtown Road, Stadium Drive, Claremont Avenue and 7th Street, to New Walkertown Road. In the mid-1980s, US 311 was moved onto new freeway through southeast Forsyth County. Part of the freeway shortly became a stretch of I-40, eventually running concurrently with the Interstate. In 1996, the route through Winston-Salem changed again, this time also going north along US 52/NC 8 to Martin Luther King Jr. Drive then east onto New Walkertown Road.

In 1997, the first section of the East Belt was opened in High Point, rerouting US 311 onto the new freeway to Eastchester Drive then back into downtown High Point with concurrency with NC 68. The old alignment along North Main Street became US 311 Business. On November 20, 2004, the second section of the "East Belt" was opened, rerouting US 311 to I-85 Bus./US 29/US 70. On November 22, 2010, the third and final section of the East Belt was completed, linking I-85; Also I-74 was established as a concurrency of US 311 from Cedar Square Road to North Main Street.

In September 2003, US 311 was extended north from Madison to NC 14/NC 87/NC 770 in Eden, via US 220 and NC 135. The extension was finally signed in August 2011. The route was approved by American Association of State Highway and Transportation Officials (AASHTO) in November 2012, after an initial request by officials in Eden, to be extended to US 58 in Virginia; which in January 2013, the North Carolina Department of Transportation (NCDOT) signed off on extending the route and replacing parts of NC 700 and NC 770. US 311 was signed in the field in Virginia, from Danville south to the state line (replacing secondary State Route 863) in September 2013.

Since 2003, a project called the US 311 Connector has been planned by NCDOT and the city of Winston-Salem. Estimated at $23.5 million (equivalent to $38.3 million in 2024), the 2.8-mile (4.5 km), four-lane, partial controlled-access highway would connect between I-40 (exit 196) and I-40 Business (exit 8) (now US 421, exit 230), linking US 311 with US 158 (Reidsville Road); it also included a landscaped medium with walking/bicycle trails parallel to it. By 2016, the project has ceased appearing in the State Transportation Improvement Program (STIP), though still part of the Winston-Salem 2035 Transportation Plan.

In May 2018, AASHTO approved a request by NCDOT to eliminate 37.03 miles (59.59 km) between Randleman and Winston-Salem, moving the southern terminus from I-73/US 220 in Randleman to Martin Luther King, Jr. Boulevard in Winston-Salem, as all but 7.27 miles (11.70 km) of this section is freeway which already has other primary designations; those non-redundant sections would be reassigned secondary North Carolina routes. In January 2019, NCDOT officially eliminated the section. Despite this, signage for US 311 from along I-74 southeast of High Point to its former southern terminus at I-73/US 220 in Randleman remains as of June 2023.

In September 2024, AASHTO received another request by NCDOT to eliminate 5.15 miles (8.29 km) in Winston-Salem, moving the southern terminus again from Martin Luther King, Jr. Boulevard in Winston-Salem to the Winston-Salem Northern Beltway (now part of I-74) in Walkertown. AASHTO would approve the request in October 2024.

In November 2024, US 311 was relocated onto the newly constructed Harville–Saunders Parkway, moving its northern terminus to an interchange with US 58 and the western terminus of State Route 1260 (SR 1260) in Danville. The former route following Berry Hill Road north of Harville-Saunders Parkway to US 311's previous northern terminus at U.S. Route 58 Business (US 58 Bus.) and SR 872 (Meadowview Drive) was redesignated as U.S. Route 311 Alternate (US 311 Alt.). Although US 311 Alt. was designated as an alternate route, it does not reconnect to US 311 near Danville; instead its northern end is at US 58 Bus.

=== North Carolina Highway 897 ===
North Carolina Highway 897
- Location: Winston-Salem–VA State Line
- Length: 43.3 mi (69.7 km)
- Existed: 1921–1925

North Carolina Highway 897 (NC 897) was an original state highway that traversed from NC 60/NC 65, in Winston-Salem, to SR 33 at the Virginia state line. Going north on Liberty Street, from 4th Street, in Winston-Salem, it went at a northeasterly route along Old Walkertown Road and Pine Hall Road to Pine Hall. Continuing northeasterly, it connects Madison, Mayodan, Stoneville and Price, North Carolina before reaching the Virginia state line. In 1925, it was renumbered as part of NC 77. Today, all of the Forsyth and Stokes section of NC 897 have been downgraded to secondary roads; while the Pine Hall to Madison section is part of US 311 and the Madison to Stoneville is part of US 220 Business.

== Junction list ==
State	County	Location	mi	km	Destinations	Notes
North Carolina	Forsyth	Walkertown	0.0	0.0	I-74 – Wytheville, High Point	Southern terminus of US 311; opened to traffic on December 23, 2020
North Carolina	Forsyth	Walkertown	1.7	2.7	NC 66 (Old Hollow Road) – Stanleyville, Kernersville	
North Carolina	Stokes	Walnut Cove	10.5	16.9	NC 65 west – Germanton	West end of NC 65 overlap
North Carolina	Stokes	Walnut Cove	11.2	18.0	NC 65 east – Stokesdale	East end of NC 65 overlap
North Carolina	Stokes	Walnut Cove	12.9	20.8	NC 89 west – Danbury	
North Carolina	Stokes	Pine Hall	18.4	29.6	NC 772 north – Sandy Ridge	
North Carolina	Rockingham	Madison	25.1	40.4	US 220 Bus. north / NC 704 west (Market Street)	North end of US 220 Business overlap, west end of NC 704 overlap
North Carolina	Rockingham	Madison	26.5	42.6	US 220 south / NC 704 east – Greensboro, Wentworth	South end of US 220/US 220 Business overlap, east end of NC 704 overlap
North Carolina	Rockingham	Mayodan	29.3	47.2	US 220 north / NC 135 west – Stoneville, Mayodan	North end of US 220 overlap, west end of NC 135 overlap
North Carolina	Rockingham	Eden	37.1	59.7	NC 770 west – Stoneville	East end of NC 135 overlap, west end of NC 770 overlap
North Carolina	Rockingham	Eden	39.7	63.9	NC 87 south – Reidsville	South end of NC 87 overlap
North Carolina	Rockingham	Eden	41.3	66.5	NC 14 south (Van Buren Road) – Reidsville	South end of NC 14 overlap
North Carolina	Rockingham	Eden	43.7	70.3	NC 14 north / NC 87 north / NC 770 east (Van Buren Road) – Martinsville	North end of NC 14/NC 87 overlap, east end of NC 770 overlap
North Carolina	Rockingham	Eden	46.6	75.0	NC 700 east (Fieldcrest Road) – Pelham	
			52.5 0.0	84.5 0.0	North Carolina–Virginia state line	
Virginia	Pittsylvania		4.4	7.1	US 311 Alt. north (Berry Hill Road) to US 58 Bus. – Danville	Southern terminus of US 311 Alt.; former US 311 north since November 2024
Virginia	Pittsylvania	Danville	6.7	10.8	US 58 (Danville Expressway) / SR 1260 east (Oak Ridge Farms Road) to US 29 – Martinsville, Danville, Greensboro, South Boston	Northern terminus of US 311; western terminus of SR 1260; roadway continues as SR 1260 east; interchange on US 58
1.000 mi = 1.609 km; 1.000 km = 0.621 mi: Concurrency terminus

== Special routes ==
=== High Point business loop ===
U.S. Highway 311 Business
- Location: High Point, North Carolina
- Length: 6.0 mi (9.7 km)
- Existed: 1997–2009

Established in 1997, when mainline US 311 was placed on new freeway east of High Point, it was 2 miles (3.2 km) long following North Main Street from US 311 to Eastchester Drive. In December 2005, US 311 Business was extended south, through the downtown area, to I-85 Bus./US 29/US 70. However, on November 23, 2009, US 311 Business was decommissioned, a couple of years before the completion of the "East Belt."

=== Danville alternate route ===
U.S. Highway 311 Alternate
- Location: Danville, Virginia
- Length: 3.2 mi (5.1 km)
- Existed: 2024–present

US 311 Alternate (US 311 Alt.) was created in November 2024 when US 311 was relocated onto the newly constructed Harville–Saunders Parkway east to US 58/SR 1260. The route follows Berry Hill Road for 3.2 miles (5.1 km) along the old alignment of US 311 north of Harville-Saunders Parkway to US 311's previous northern terminus at US 58 Bus./SR 872 (Meadowview Drive). Although US 311 Alt. was designated as an alternate route, it does not reconnect to US 311 near Danville; instead its northern end is at US 58 Bus.
