= Hardin E. Taliaferro =

Hardin Edwards Taliaferro
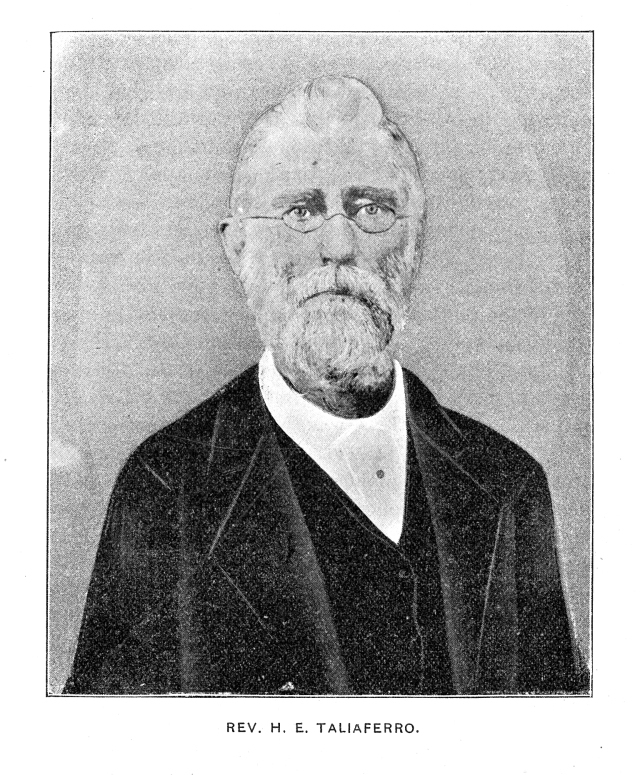
- Born: March 4, 1811; Surry County, North Carolina
- Died: November 2, 1875 (aged 64)
- Occupation(s): Preacher, writer, southern humorist

Hardin Edwards Taliaferro (March 4, 1811 – November 2, 1875) was a 19th-century Southern American humorist and a Baptist preacher. Taliaferro was born near Pine Ridge in Surry County, North Carolina but moved to Tennessee, where he was baptized two years later. In 1834, he married Elizabeth Henderson, who was ordained a preacher. In the fall of 1835, Taliaferro moved to Alabama, where he would reside for the following 20 years, serving many churches. In 1875 Taliaferro returned to Surry County, where he died on November 2.

In 1857 Taliaferro published his first book, The Grace of God Magnified. In Alabama, Taliaferro was highly regarded as a minister, and editor of a religious periodical, the South Western Baptist. His most famous work of humor, Fisher's River (North Carolina) Scenes and Characters, by "Skitt, Who Was Raised Thar,"' was a collection of humorous stories based on the people of Taliaferro's youth in Surry County. The collection, written under the pen name of "Skitt," a boyhood nickname, was published by Harper & Brothers in 1859”. His writing and contribution of “sketches” continued into the 1860s, where he submitted works to the Southern Literary Messenger. Among his most famous sketches is “Famus or No Famus”.

Fisher's River Scenes and Characters is a collection of stories that accurately reflects the people of Surry County, North Carolina. Topics range from “the illiterate bumpkin visiting a large city” to religious conversions. Characters within the stories are based on the residents of Surry County, some of whom are named in Fisher's River Scenes.

Taliaferro is recognized for his anecdotes on religious subjects, which he “recorded more...than any other frontier humorist". Taliaferro's contribution to Southern humorist literature is unique due to the collection of other individual's stories and the accurate depiction of dialect. Taliaferro's considered to be among the earliest realists, as far as his writing technique, within America. Taliaferro's writings employ southern dialect that creates a full image of not only the characters, but the culture in which the individuals reside.

== Bibliography ==
- Hardin E. Taliaferro (1859). Fisher's River (North Carolina): Scenes and Characters. Harper.
- Hardin E. Taliaferro (1857). The Grace of God Magnified: An Experimental Tract. Southern Baptist Pub. Society.
- Walser, Richard (1978). "Biblio-biography of Skitt Taliaferro". The North Carolina Historical Review. 55 (4): 375–95. JSTOR 23534920.
