= Fairview Crossroads, North Carolina =

Unincorporated community in North Carolina, US

Coordinates: 36°19′41″N 80°43′16″W

Fairview Crossroads (or more commonly Fairview) is an unincorporated community in Surry County, North Carolina, United States. Historically, the community was known earliest as Alberty (Powell 1968, p. 167).

== Geography ==
The community is located in Marsh Township and is centered on the intersection of U.S. Highway 601 and North Carolina Highway 268. Fairview has an elevation of 1,110 feet above sea level. Area landmarks include Fairview Baptist Church and Fairview cemetery.
