= Pine Ridge, Surry County, North Carolina =

Coordinates: 36°29′56″N 80°43′05″W

Pine Ridge
- Unincorporated community
- Interactive map of Pine Ridge
- Country: United States
- State: North Carolina
- Counties: Surry
- Time zone: Eastern (EST)
  - Summer (DST): EDT

Pine Ridge is an unincorporated community in the Stewarts Creek Township of northern Surry County, North Carolina, United States, located near the city of Mount Airy on North Carolina Highway 89 (West Pine Street). The community is located between the Little Fisher River and Stewarts Creek and has an altitude of 1,347 feet (Powell 1968, p. 384). Area attractions include Pine Ridge Classic Golf Course. Noted 19th-century humorist Hardin E. Taliaferro was born near Pine Ridge in 1811.
