= Stanleyville, North Carolina =

- Unincorporated community
- Location within North Carolina Location within the United States
- Coordinates: 36°12′8″N 80°16′51″W
- Country: United States
- State: North Carolina
- County: Forsyth
- Elevation: 942 ft (287 m)
- Time zone: UTC-5 (Eastern (EST))
  - Summer (DST): UTC-4 (EDT)
- ZIP codes: 27105
- GNIS feature ID: 995415

Stanleyville is an unincorporated community between northern Winston-Salem and Rural Hall in Forsyth County, North Carolina, United States. Most of the community has been annexed by Winston-Salem. Stanleyville is located along North Carolina Highway 66 (NC 66) near the I-74 interchange with U.S. Route 52 (US 52). It is home to many farms and recently has seen a surge in commercial expansion. It does not have a post office, so all mail is routed through adjoining Rural Hall.
