= Horneytown, North Carolina =

- Unincorporated community
- Location within North Carolina Location within the United States
- Coordinates: 36°01′10″N 80°03′36″W
- Country: United States
- State: North Carolina
- County: Forsyth
- Named for: The Horney Family
- Elevation: 912 ft (278 m)
- Time zone: UTC-5 (Eastern (EST))
  - Summer (DST): UTC-4 (EDT)
- Area code: 336
- GNIS feature ID: 987072

Horneytown is an unincorporated community in Forsyth County, North Carolina, United States. Horneytown is 5 miles (8.0 km) northwest of High Point.

Horneytown was named for the Horney family of early settlers. It has frequently been noted on lists of unusual place names.

Fire protection services in Horneytown and the surrounding area is provided by the Horneytown Fire Department, a volunteer fire department established in 1958. The current fire chief is Kelly Baker.
