= Westfield, North Carolina =

Unincorporated community in North Carolina, US

Coordinates: 36°28′30″N 80°26′49″W

Westfield in an unincorporated community in Surry and Stokes counties in North Carolina, United States. The community itself is located almost entirely within Surry County, with a small portion extending east into Stokes County. The majority of Westfield's Zip Code Tabulation Area (Zip Code 27053) is located within Stokes County.

== History ==
Westfield was originally named "Tom's Creek" but the name was later changed to Westfield in recognition of the Quaker ("Society of Friends") mission, first established here in 1760, by members of New Garden Friend's Meeting from Guilford County, North Carolina. (Powell 1968, p. 525). Early Friends from New Garden traveled through Quaker Gap in the Sauratown Mountains to establish the Meeting at Tom's Creek, and the area was referred to at the time as "the western field,' later becoming "Westfield." Westfield is the childhood hometown of Kenneth Lowe, president of Scripps Networks Interactive, and the creator of Home & Garden Television.

== Demographics ==
Westfield's Zip Code Tabulation Area (Zip Code 27053) has a population of about 2,811 as of the 2000 census. The population is 50.1% male and 49.9% female. About 90.9% of the population is white, 7.0% African-American, 2.8% Hispanic, and 1.4% of other races. 0.5% of people are two or more races.

The median household income is $32,768 with 10.2% of the population living below the poverty line.

== Geography ==
The community has an elevation of 1,160 feet above sea level. Landmarks near the center of the community include the community post office, cafeteria and gymnasium buildings of the old Westfield Elementary School, the headquarters building of the Westfield Volunteer Fire Department, Westfield Friends meeting house, and Westfield Baptist Church. North Carolina Highway 89, also known as Westfield Road, serves as the main thoroughfare in the community, connecting it to Mount Airy and Interstate Highway 74 to the west, and Danbury, the Stokes County seat to the east. Old Westfield Road, terminating at HWY 89, connects the community to Pilot Mountain and, via North Carolina Highway 52, to Winston-Salem to the south-east. North Carolina Highway 66 also connects the community to the cities of King and Winston-Salem.

== Notable person ==
- Howie Nunn, Major League Baseball player with the St. Louis Cardinals and Cincinnati Reds
