= Francisco, North Carolina =

Francisco
- Unincorporated community
- Location within the state of North Carolina
- Coordinates: 36°30′32″N 80°21′21″W
- Country: United States
- State: North Carolina
- County: Stokes
- Elevation: 1,138 ft (347 m)
- Time zone: UTC-5 (Eastern (EST))
  - Summer (DST): UTC-4 (EDT)
- ZIP codes: 27053
- GNIS feature ID: 985363

Francisco (/ˈfrænsɪskoʊ/ FRAN-sis-koh) is an unincorporated community in northern Stokes County in the U.S. state of North Carolina, approximately thirteen miles northwest of the county seat, Danbury, on North Carolina State Highway 89, and less than three miles from the North Carolina/Virginia border.

The community is located adjacent to the Dan River and includes a volunteer fire station, Francisco Elementary School (now closed), a trash disposal and recycling site, a Presbyterian church, and a Ruritan meeting house/community building. At one time, Francisco had its own post-office address. At its closing in the 1960s, Francisco addresses were consolidated with the Westfield Post Office, and became Rural Route 2, Westfield, NC.
