= Walkertown, North Carolina =

- Town
- Location in Forsyth County and the state of North Carolina
- Coordinates: 36°08′05″N 80°09′00″W
- Country: United States
- State: North Carolina
- County: Forsyth
- Incorporated: 1984
- Named for: Robert Walker

Area
  - Total: 6.72 sq mi (17.40 km^{2})
  - Land: 6.70 sq mi (17.35 km^{2})
  - Water: 0.019 sq mi (0.05 km^{2})
- Elevation: 896 ft (273 m)

Population (2020)
  - Total: 5,692
  - Density: 849.7/sq mi (328.09/km^{2})
- Time zone: UTC-5 (Eastern (EST))
  - Summer (DST): UTC-4 (EDT)
- ZIP code: 27051
- Area code: 336
- FIPS code: 37-70660
- GNIS feature ID: 2406821
- Website: www.townofwalkertown.us

Walkertown is a town in Forsyth County, North Carolina, United States and a rural area outside of Winston-Salem. It is part of the Piedmont Triad. The population was 5,695 at the 2020 census.

== Geography ==
Walkertown is located in northeastern Forsyth County and is bordered to the southwest by the city of Winston-Salem. Interstate 74, traverses parallel with NC 66; with both highways going southeast to Kernersville and northwest to Rural Hall. U.S. Route 311 connects I-74 to Walkertown, while giving Downtown Walkertown access to Downtown Winston-Salem. U.S. Route 158 connects the "overall" town with Downtown Winston-Salem and I-74. US 311 continues north-northeast 22 miles (35 km) to Madison, with US 158 continuing east-northeast 33 miles (53 km) to Reidsville North Carolina Highway 66 crosses both highways, leading northwest 10 miles (16 km) to Rural Hall.

According to the United States Census Bureau, Walkertown has a total area of 6.6 square miles (17.1 km^{2}), of which 0.19 square miles (0.5 km^{2}), or 0.31%, is water.

== Demographics ==
Historical population
| Census | Pop. | Note | %± |
|---|---|---|---|
| 1990 | 1,200 | | — |
| 2000 | 4,009 | | 234.1% |
| 2010 | 4,675 | | 16.6% |
| 2020 | 5,692 | | 21.8% |
| 2021 (est.) | 5,781 | ▲ | 1.6% |
U.S. Decennial Census

=== 2020 census ===
As of the 2020 census, Walkertown had a population of 5,692. The median age was 44.8 years. 19.9% of residents were under the age of 18 and 20.6% of residents were 65 years of age or older. For every 100 females there were 92.9 males, and for every 100 females age 18 and over there were 92.3 males age 18 and over.

99.8% of residents lived in urban areas, while 0.2% lived in rural areas.

There were 2,413 households in Walkertown, of which 27.8% had children under the age of 18 living in them. There were 1,486 families residing in the town. Of all households, 48.9% were married-couple households, 18.6% were households with a male householder and no spouse or partner present, and 27.1% were households with a female householder and no spouse or partner present. About 27.5% of all households were made up of individuals and 12.2% had someone living alone who was 65 years of age or older.

There were 2,598 housing units, of which 7.1% were vacant. The homeowner vacancy rate was 2.2% and the rental vacancy rate was 4.3%.

Racial composition as of the 2020 census
| Race | Number | Percent |
|---|---|---|
| White | 3,974 | 69.8% |
| Black or African American | 1,001 | 17.6% |
| American Indian and Alaska Native | 39 | 0.7% |
| Asian | 53 | 0.9% |
| Native Hawaiian and Other Pacific Islander | 7 | 0.1% |
| Some other race | 247 | 4.3% |
| Two or more races | 371 | 6.5% |
| Hispanic or Latino (of any race) | 464 | 8.2% |

=== 2000 census ===
As of the census of 2000, there were 4,009 people, 1,696 households, and 1,187 families residing in the town. The population density was 683.6 inhabitants per square mile (263.9/km^{2}). There were 1,793 housing units at an average density of 305.7 per square mile (118.0/km^{2}). The racial makeup of the town was 88.03% White, 10.00% African American, 0.40% Native American, 0.30% Asian, 0.42% from other races, and 0.85% from two or more races. Hispanic or Latino of any race were 1.40% of the population.

There were 1,696 households, out of which 27.5% had children under the age of 18 living with them, 59.4% were married couples living together, 7.8% had a female householder with no husband present, and 30.0% were non-families. 26.6% of all households were made up of individuals, and 10.9% had someone living alone who was 65 years of age or older. The average household size was 2.36 and the average family size was 2.85.

In the town, the population was spread out, with 20.9% under the age of 18, 7.1% from 18 to 24, 29.8% from 25 to 44, 27.0% from 45 to 64, and 15.2% who were 65 years of age or older. The median age was 41 years. For every 100 females, there were 94.8 males. For every 100 females age 18 and over, there were 93.8 males.

The median income for a household in the town was $43,454, and the median income for a family was $53,679. Males had a median income of $36,558 versus $26,339 for females. The per capita income for the town was $21,304. About 2.7% of families and 4.9% of the population were below the poverty line, including 4.4% of those under age 18 and 6.3% of those age 65 or over.

== History ==
Walkertown was named for Robert Walker Esq. who was living at the site by 1771 after relocating from the original county seat of Richmond which was destroyed by a cyclone. Many of his descendants relocated to the West during the 1850s. Walker's home remained standing through the mid-20th century. The town was incorporated in 1984.

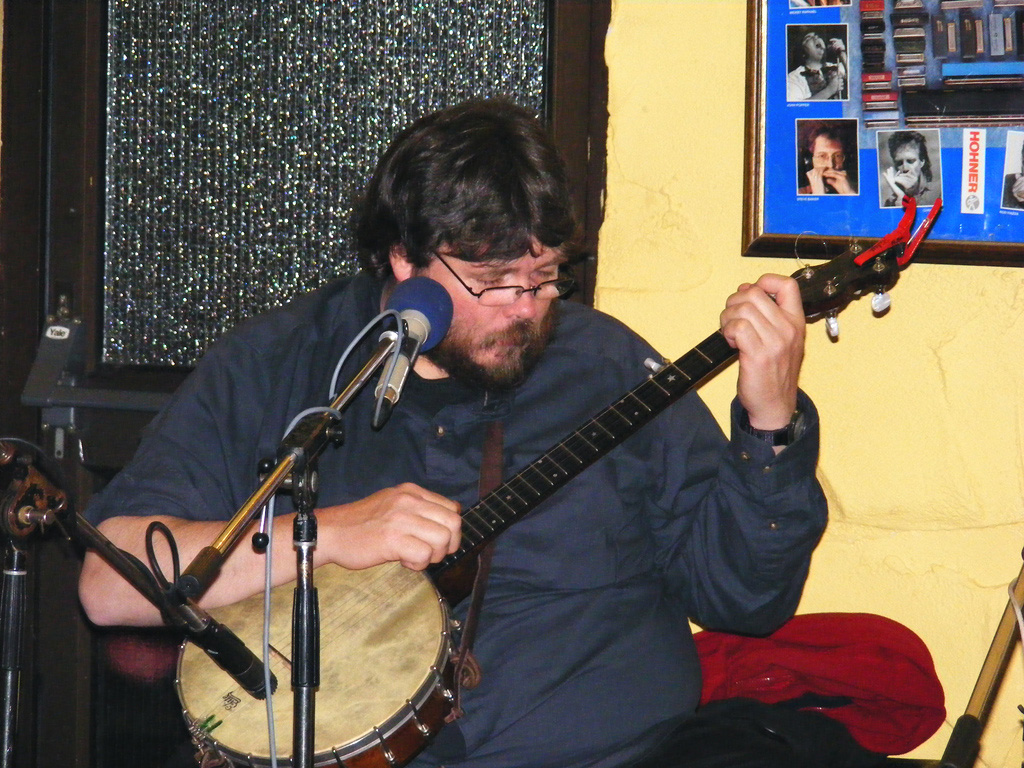
The old-time musician Riley Baugus, a notable inhabitant of Walkertown

The Thomas A. Crews House was listed on the National Register of Historic Places in 1993.

== Education ==
Walkertown, as of the rest of Forsyth County, is within the Winston-Salem/Forsyth County Schools school district. Walkertown Elementary School is in the municipality. As of 2020 Walkertown Middle School and Walkertown High School are outside of, but surrounded by, the municipal limits.

== Notable person ==
- Riley Baugus, old-time musician.
