= National Register of Historic Places listings in Surry County, North Carolina =

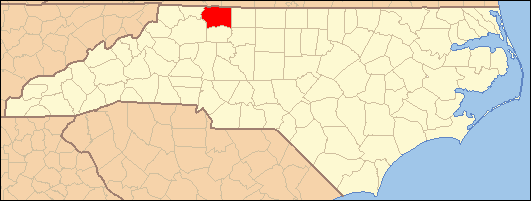
Map showing Surry County in North Carolina

This list includes properties and districts listed on the National Register of Historic Places in Surry County, North Carolina, United States. Click the "Map of all coordinates" link to the right to view an online map of all properties and districts with latitude and longitude coordinates in the table below.

== Current listings ==
This National Park Service list is complete through NPS recent listings posted July 31, 2026.

	Name on the Register	Image	Date listed	Location	City or town	Description
1	Samuel Josiah Atkinson House	Samuel Josiah Atkinson House	April 16, 2012 (#12000217)	586 Atkinson Rd. 36°17′41″N 80°33′40″W	Siloam	
2	Bank of Pilot Mountain, (Former)	Bank of Pilot Mountain, (Former)	December 1, 1997 (#97001497)	100 E. Main St. 36°23′05″N 80°28′01″W	Pilot Mountain	
3	W. F. Carter House	W. F. Carter House	August 18, 1983 (#83001917)	418 S. Main St. 36°29′48″N 80°36′17″W	Mount Airy	
4	William Carter House		March 15, 1990 (#90000349)	SR 1626, 0.35 miles (0.56 km) west of the junction with SR 1625; 36°32′24″N 80°40′06″W	Mount Airy	
5	Cedar Point	Cedar Point	September 11, 2003 (#03000927)	350 W. Main St. 36°14′36″N 80°51′27″W	Elkin	
6	Country Club Estates Historic District		December 22, 2020 (#100005977)	Includes portions of Club View Dr., Country Club Rd., Fairway Ln., and Greenhill Rd. 36°31′33″N 80°36′33″W	Mount Airy	
7	C. C. Cundiff House		July 21, 1983 (#83001918)	SR 2230; 36°17′01″N 80°35′12″W	Siloam	
8	Downtown Elkin Historic District	Downtown Elkin Historic District	November 1, 2000 (#00001292)	Roughly bounded by Market St., Hugh Chatham Bridge, Standard St., and Front St. 36°14′37″N 80°51′01″W	Elkin	
9	Bernard Franklin House	Bernard Franklin House	April 24, 1973 (#73001369)	Northwest of Dobson on SR 1331; 36°27′24″N 80°49′13″W	Dobson	
10	Ben and Barbara Graves House	Ben and Barbara Graves House	December 19, 2019 (#100004799)	309 Fairview Ave. 36°31′06″N 80°36′36″W	Mount Airy	
11	Gwyn Avenue-Bridge Street Historic District	Gwyn Avenue-Bridge Street Historic District	August 28, 2007 (#07000882)	Roughly bounded by N. Bridge St., Mill View Rd., Market St. and Church St. 36°14′42″N 80°50′56″W	Elkin	
12	Hauser Farm	Hauser Farm	March 1, 2002 (#02000113)	308 Horne Creek Farm Rd. 36°15′59″N 80°29′09″W	Pinnacle	
13	Haystack Farm		December 2, 1982 (#82001306)	South of Oak Grove on SR 1480; 36°27′31″N 80°44′56″W	Oak Grove	
14	Edgar Harvey Hennis House	Edgar Harvey Hennis House	February 20, 1986 (#86000318)	1056 N. Main St. 36°30′44″N 80°36′29″W	Mount Airy	
15	Hugh Chatham Memorial Hospital, (former)	Hugh Chatham Memorial Hospital, (former)	May 2, 2002 (#02000437)	230 Hawthorne Rd. 36°15′17″N 80°50′45″W	Elkin	
16	J. J. Jones High School		April 27, 2021 (#100006464)	213-215 Jones School Rd. 36°31′53″N 80°36′12″W	Mount Airy	
17	Lebanon Hill Historic District		December 22, 2020 (#100005978)	Roughly bounded by Howard, Mitchell, South, and Woodruff Sts., and the Mount Airy Historic District; 36°30′41″N 80°36′40″W	Mount Airy	
18	Marion House and Marion Brothers Store	Marion House and Marion Brothers Store	December 26, 2012 (#12001090)	7034 Siloam Rd. 36°17′10″N 80°33′52″W	Siloam	
19	William Alfred Moore House	William Alfred Moore House	March 5, 1986 (#86000406)	202 Moore Ave. 36°30′06″N 80°36′21″W	Mount Airy	
20	Mount Airy Historic District	Mount Airy Historic District	October 3, 1985 (#85002931)	Main, Brown, Market, Franklin, W. Pine, Rockford, Worth, Cherry, and Gilmer Sts., and Moore and Hines Aves.; also Willow and W. Oak Sts.; also 409, 417-423 Franklin St.; 418 West Pine St., 3 unaddressed parcels at the east corner of South Main and Hamburg Sts., and 209, 215, 218, 219 Hines Ave.; also includes portions of Bank, Broad, West Church, Durham, West Elm, Hadley, East and West Haymore, North Main, Maple, Merritt, Price, Rockford, Spring, and Willow Sts., Maiden Ln., Patterson and Rawley Aves., 36°29′59″N 80°36′25″W	Mount Airy	Second set of boundaries represents a boundary increase of August 28, 2012; third set represent a boundary decrease of April 9, 2021; fourth set represent a boundary increase of April 27, 2021.
21	North Carolina Granite Corporation Quarry Complex	North Carolina Granite Corporation Quarry Complex	August 6, 1980 (#80002900)	East of Mount Airy on NC 103; 36°30′29″N 80°35′10″W	Mount Airy	
22	Pilot Hosiery Mill		August 24, 2021 (#100006855)	224 East Main St. 36°23′01″N 80°27′51″W	Pilot Mountain	
23	Pilot Mountain Downtown Historic District	Pilot Mountain Downtown Historic District	April 14, 2022 (#100007599)	Portions of 100 and 200 blks. East Main, 100 blk. West Main, 100 blk. Depot, 100 blk. West Marian, and 100 blk. South Stephens Sts. 36°23′11″N 80°28′12″W	Pilot Mountain	
24	Renfro Mill	Renfro Mill	October 12, 2000 (#00001208)	Junction of Willow and Oak Sts. 36°30′05″N 80°36′36″W	Mount Airy	
25	Ridge Westfield Elementary School	Ridge Westfield Elementary School	December 19, 2019 (#100004794)	4416 Westfield Rd. 36°30′40″N 80°30′22″W	Mount Airy	
26	Rockford Historic District	Rockford Historic District	August 27, 1976 (#76001338)	SR 2221; 36°16′09″N 80°39′10″W	Rockford	
27	Surry County Courthouse	Surry County Courthouse	May 10, 1979 (#79001751)	N. Main St. between School and Kapp Sts. 36°23′45″N 80°43′25″W	Dobson	
28	Taylor Park Historic District		April 27, 2021 (#100006466)	Includes all or portions of Charles, Grace, Howard, North Main, and Marion Sts., Crescent Dr., North and South Park, and Wrenn Aves. 36°30′53″N 80°36′26″W	Mount Airy	
29	Trinity Episcopal Church	Trinity Episcopal Church	January 9, 1986 (#86000031)	472 N. Main St. 36°30′12″N 80°36′31″W	Mount Airy	

== See also ==
- National Register of Historic Places listings in North Carolina
- List of National Historic Landmarks in North Carolina
