= Rachel Z. Arndt =

American fiction writer

Rachel Arndt
- Education: University of Iowa
- Writing career
- Genre: Essays
- Website: rachelzarndt.com

Rachel Arndt is an American writer. She is the author of the essay collection Beyond Measure.

== Literary career ==
Arndt obtained an M.F.A in poetry from the Iowa Writers' Workshop and another in nonfiction from the school's Nonfiction Writing Program. She was an editor at The Iowa Review and assistant poetry editor at McSweeney’s.

=== Beyond Measure ===
Her debut collection of essays, Beyond Measure, was published by Sarabande Books in 2018. It contains 19 brief essays on the human need to reduce living to numbers, ranging from sleep cycles and body weight to gym routines and dating apps.

Publishers Weekly described her tone as "poignant and undogmatic", writing that "Her experiences will particularly resonate with female readers, who will identify with her coping mechanisms for dealing with sexist measurements imposed by society, from stereotypes of narcoleptic women as hysterical and attention seeking to false constraints placed on female intelligence and physical strength." Kirkus Reviews argued that "Most memoirists address dating with humor and medical issues with pathos, but Arndt cultivates a stoic middle ground, an approach that at its best reflects rigorous observation but sometimes is so distant the writing feels flat."

Southwest Contemporary wrote: "What is most unnerving about the essays’ tightening focus on selfhood is their slow but inevitable realization that every time we go to the gym or take a pill or make a purchase at Bed, Bath, and Beyond, we are also making ourselves into a product—we are doing it to ourselves."

Comparing it to Leslie Jamison’s The Empathy Exams, The Masters Review called it "an elegantly structured book" and Arndt "a thoughtful, deliberate writer. . . with wit and flashes of poetic insight."

== Bibliography ==
- Beyond Measure (Sarabande Books, 2018)
