= Leslie Jamison =

American novelist and essayist

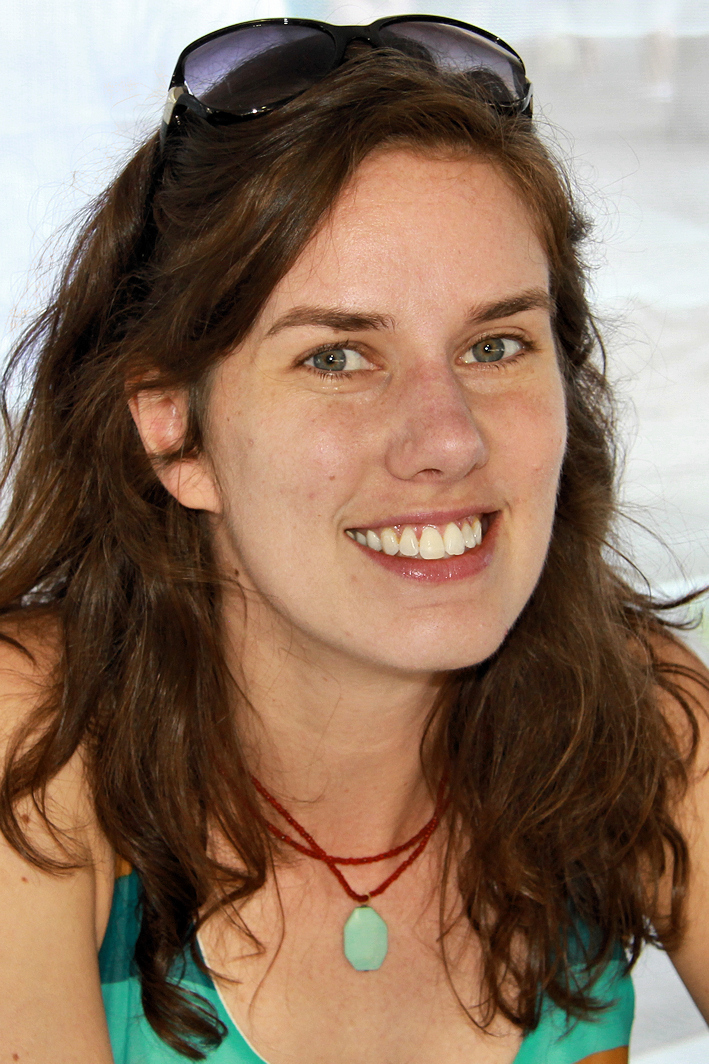
- Leslie Jamison at the 2014 Texas Book Festival
- Born: June 21, 1983 (age 43); Washington, D.C., U.S.
- Education: Harvard College (AB); Iowa Writers' Workshop (MFA); Yale University (PhD)
- Occupations: Novelist; essayist; academic
- Writing career
- Language: English
- Period: 21st century
- Notable works: The Gin Closet; The Empathy Exams
- Website: www.lesliejamison.com

Leslie Sierra Jamison (born June 21, 1983) is an American novelist and essayist. She is the author of the 2010 novel The Gin Closet and the 2014 essay collection The Empathy Exams. Jamison also directs the nonfiction concentration in writing at Columbia University School of the Arts.

== Early life ==
Jamison was born in Washington, D.C., and raised in the Pacific Palisades neighborhood of Los Angeles. Her parents are Joanne Leslie, a nutritionist and former professor of public health, and economist and global health researcher Dean Jamison; she is the niece of clinical psychologist and writer Kay Redfield Jamison. Jamison grew up with two older brothers. Her parents divorced when she was 11, after which she lived with her mother.

Jamison attended Harvard College, where she majored in English and graduated in 2004. Her senior thesis dealt with incest in the work of William Faulkner. While an undergraduate, she won the Edward Eager Memorial Fund prize in creative writing, an award also won by her classmate, writer Uzodimna Iweala. Jamison was a member of the college literary magazine The Harvard Advocate and social club The Signet Society.

Jamison then attended the Iowa Writers' Workshop, where she earned an MFA in fiction, and Yale University, where she earned a Ph.D. in English literature. At Yale, she worked with Wai Chee Dimock, Amy Hungerford, and Caleb Smith, submitting a dissertation titled "The Recovered: Addiction and Sincerity in 20th-Century American Literature" in 2016.

== Career ==
Jamison's work has been published in Best New American Voices 2008, A Public Space, The New York Review of Books, and Black Warrior Review. She was a 2024–2025 Cullman Center Fellow at the New York Public Library.

=== Books ===
Jamison's first novel, The Gin Closet, was published by Free Press in 2010. Jamison has described the book as the account of a "young New Yorker [who] goes looking for an aunt she’s never met...and finds her drinking herself to death in a Nevada trailer. They end up building a precarious but deeply invested life together, trying...to save each other’s lives." It received positive reviews in the San Francisco Chronicle, Vogue, and Publishers Weekly.

Jamison's second book, The Empathy Exams, an essay collection published by Graywolf Press, debuted in 2014 at number 11 on the New York Times bestseller list. The book received wide acclaim from critics, with Olivia Laing writing in The New York Times, "It’s hard to imagine a stronger, more thoughtful voice emerging this year." Each essay uses a mixture of journalistic and memoir approaches that combine Jamison's own experiences and those of the people in various communities to explore the empathetic exchange between people.

Jamison's third book, The Recovering: Intoxication and Its Aftermath, was published in 2018 by Little, Brown. Publishers Weekly called it an "unsparing and luminous autobiographical study of alcoholism." It combines Jamison's memoir of her own alcoholism with a survey of others (some of them famous), with a focus on recovery.

Jamison's fourth book, Make It Scream, Make It Burn, was published in 2019 by Little, Brown. It is a collection of 14 essays on the themes of longing, looking and dwelling.

Her 2024 memoir Splinters: Another Kind of Love Story was published to positive reviews, focusing on her divorce and struggles raising her daughter. In an interview with Vanity Fair, she said, "I love that you connected that idea of splinters and the maybe painful continuities of selfhood, the memories or parts of yourself that you can’t ever fully let go of or fully purge", referencing the idea the book was named after. To promote the book, Jamison began the Splinters book tour with fellow memoirist Mary Karr in February 2024.

=== Teaching ===
In the fall of 2015, Jamison joined the faculty at Columbia University School of the Arts. She is assistant professor and director of the nonfiction concentration in writing. Jamison also leads a group of Columbia University MFA students in a Creative Writing Workshop at the Marian House, transitional housing for women in recovery.

== Personal life ==
Jamison lives in Park Slope, Brooklyn, with a daughter she shares with her ex-husband, the writer Charles Bock. She and Bock divorced in early 2020.

She is a supporter of the boycott of Israeli cultural institutions, including publishers and literary festivals. She was an original signatory of the manifesto "Refusing Complicity in Israel's Literary Institutions".

== Bibliography ==
=== Books ===
Novels

- The Gin Closet (Free, 2010)
- The Daughters (forthcoming 2027)

Nonfiction

- The Empathy Exams (Graywolf, 2014)
- 52 Blue (2014)
- Such Mean Estate (2015)
- The Recovering: Intoxication and its Aftermath (Little, Brown, 2018)
- Make It Scream, Make It Burn (Little, Brown, 2019)
- Splinters: Another Kind of Love Story (Little, Brown, 2024)

=== Essays and reporting ===
- Jamison, Leslie (February 13–20, 2023). "Not fooling anyone : the dubious rise of imposter syndrome". Annals of Psychology. The New Yorker. 99 (1): 26–32. (Note: Online version is titled "Why everyone feels like they're faking it".)

=== Critical studies and reviews of Jamison's work ===
The recovering

- Greenberg, Gary (April 2, 2018). "Whiskey and ink : the stories that writers tell us—and themselves—about drinking". The Critics. Books. The New Yorker. 94 (7): 84–89. (Note: Online version is titled "Leslie Jamison's 'The Recovering' and the stories we tell about drinking".)

———————

Bibliography notes
