= Andy Griffith Museum =

Museum in Mount Airy, NC, US

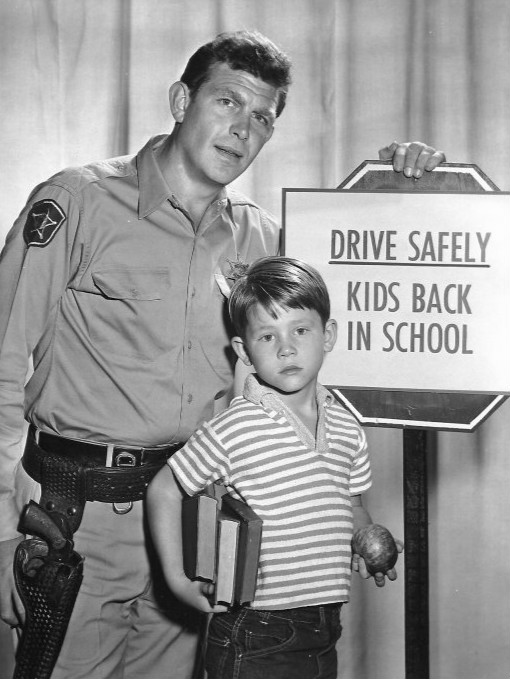
- Andy Griffith with Ron Howard in 1961
- Established: September 26, 2009
- Location: 218 Rockford Street; Mount Airy, North Carolina 27030
- Coordinates: 36°29′52.2″N 80°36′31.6″W
- Founder: Emmett Forrest
- Website: www.andygriffithmuseum.com

The Andy Griffith Museum is a museum dedicated to the life and career of American actor, television producer, and singer Andy Griffith. The museum, which houses the world's largest collection of Andy Griffith memorabilia, is located in Griffith's hometown of Mount Airy, North Carolina. Much of the museum's collection was acquired by Griffith's friend and the founder of Andy Griffith Museum, Emmett Forrest. The facility opened to the public on September 26, 2009.

== Location and building ==
The Andy Griffith Museum is located in Mount Airy, North Carolina, a half-mile from Griffith's childhood home. The 2,500-square-feet, which cost approximately $500,000 to construct, is adjacent to the Andy Griffith Playhouse.

The museum founder, the late Emmett Forrest, a lifelong friend of Griffith's since elementary school, planned the museum with the Surry Arts Council for more than twenty-five years. The Andy Griffith Museum was opened on September 26, 2009.

A $600,000 upgrade of the museum, with funding that included $200,000 from the city, was completed in 2017.

== Collection ==
Emmett Forrest donated an extensive collection of Andy Griffith memorabilia, which forms the basis for the museum's permanent exhibition. The Surry Arts Council did not actually own the collection until after Forrest's death in 2013, at which time the estate turned over the collection. Many of the artifacts were in poor condition and the museum made efforts to preserve the items and keep them in good shape.

Personal items on exhibit includes a rocking chair that Andy Griffith's father, Carl Griffith, made for his mother, Geneva. A large portion of the museum includes pieces from the sets of The Andy Griffith Show, which aired from 1960 to 1968, and the Matlock television series.

The museum also houses objects related to actress Betty Lynn (now deceased), who played Barney’s girlfriend and lived in Mount Airy, and the late Don Knotts.
