= Jerry Hemmings =

Jerry D. Hemmings (born February 17, 1948) is an American former basketball coach and professional basketball player. He coached the Brandon University men's basketball team to four CIAU National Championships. Hemmings is a member of the Manitoba Basketball Hall of Fame.

== Career ==
=== Playing career ===
Hemmings played at North Surry High School in his native Mount Airy, North Carolina, graduating in 1966. He spent his college career at Surry Community College in Dobson, North Carolina and at Lakehead University in Thunder Bay, Ontario. In 1970, he was named Lakehead's Male Athlete of the Year. In his final season at Lakehead (1971–72), Hemmings earned WCIAA Great Plains First Team honors. In the 1972-73 season, he played professionally for Etoile de Voiron in France.

He was inducted into the Lakehead Sports Wall of Fame as an athlete in 2001.

=== Coaching career ===
His career on the sidelines began in the 1973-74 season as assistant coach at Lakehead University. In 1974, he became head men's basketball coach at Brandon University in Brandon, Manitoba and would remain in that position until 2003, compiling a record of 734 wins. During a sabbatical leave in 1983-84, he served as volunteer assistant coach at Tulane University.

Under his guidance the Brandon Bobcats won CIAU National Championships in 1987, 1988, 1989 and 1996 and took silver medals in 1980, 2000 and 2001. He also coached the team to Great Plains Athletic Conference Championships in 1980, 1981, 1982, 1983, 1987, 1988, 1989, 1991, 1993, 1995, 1996, 1997, 1998 and one Canada West Championship in 2002.

Hemmings was presented with the Stuart W. Aberdeen Memorial Trophy as CIAU Coach of the Year in 1980, while earning Great Plains Coach of the Year distinction in 1980, 1982, 1983, 1988, 1992, 1999, 2000 and 2001.

In 2003-04, he served as head coach of Al Ittihad of the Syrian elite league, in 2004-05, Hemmings coached the Mattersburg 49ers in the Austrian top-flight. In 2009, he accepted the position as head coach of AEK Larnaca in Cyprus.

In 2007, Hemmings was inducted into the Manitoba Basketball Hall of Fame as a builder.

In June 2014, Hemmings announced his retirement.

==== National team ====
Hemmings served as assistant coach of the Canadian Men's Basketball team from 1989 to 1994, including the World Championships in 1990 and 1994. He guided Canada's squad to a silver medal at the 1991 World University Games.
