= Trinity Episcopal Church (Mount Airy, North Carolina) =

Historic church in North Carolina, United States

- U.S. National Register of Historic Places
- U.S. Historic district – Contributing property
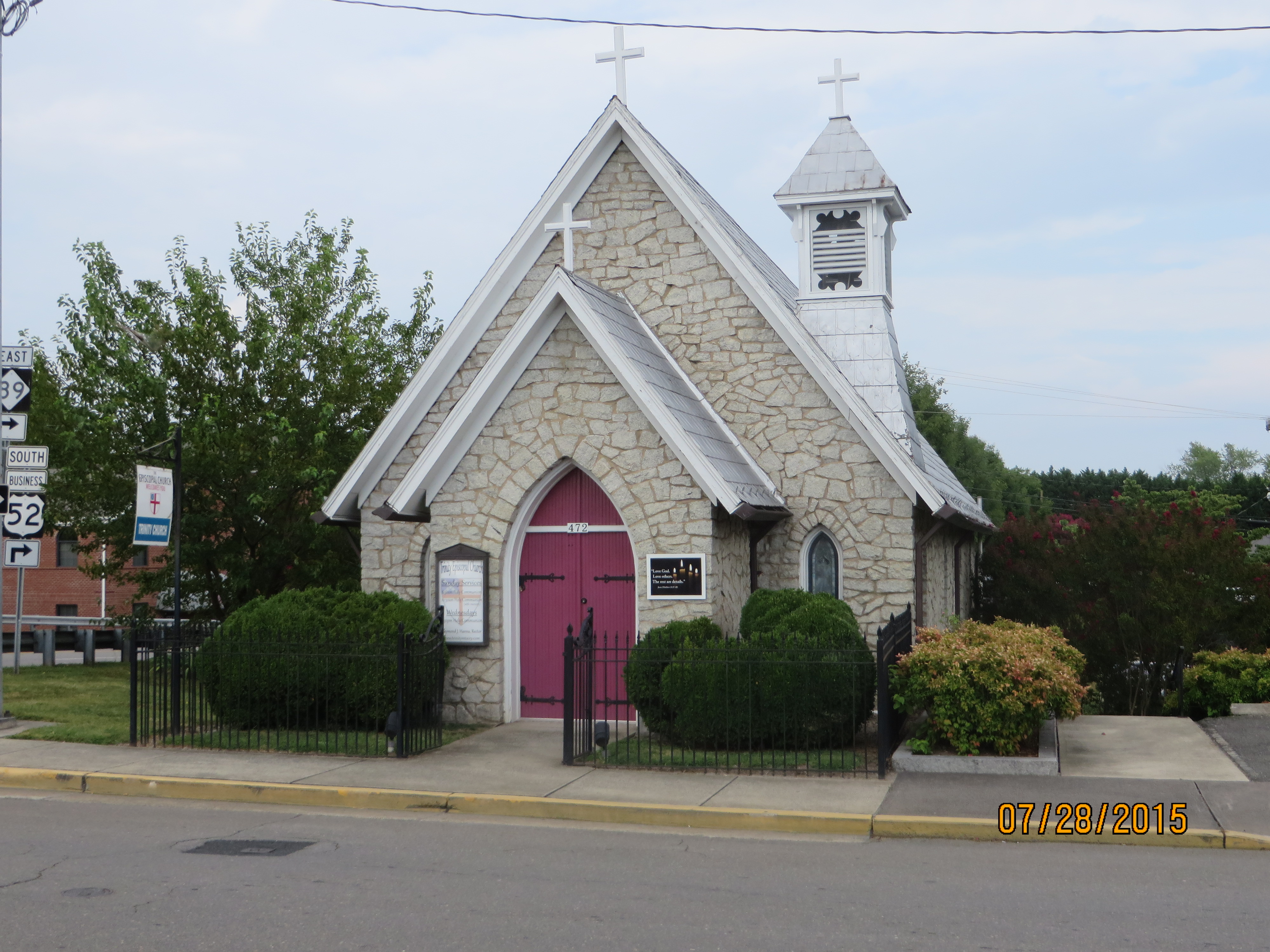

- Location within North Carolina Location within the United States
- Location: 472 N. Main St. Mount Airy, North Carolina
- Coordinates: 36°30′11″N 80°36′24″W
- Area: less than one acre
- Built: 1896
- Architect: Francis Woodruffe, T.A. Tesh
- Architectural style: Gothic Revival
- NRHP reference No.: 86000031
- Added to NRHP: January 9, 1986

Trinity Episcopal Church is a historic Episcopal church located in Mount Airy, Surry County, North Carolina. It was built in 1896, and is a one-story, Gothic Revival-style masonry structure of uncoarsed granite rubble, locally sourced and donated by parishioner Thomas Woodruff, president of the North Carolina Granite Corporation at that time. The first service in the new building was held in July of 1896. Trinity was consecrated on October 13, 1900, and was dedicated to "…the Worship and Service of Almighty God, the administration of His Holy Sacraments, the Reading and Preaching of His Holy Word, and for the performance of All Holy Offices" by the Bishop of North Carolina, the Rt. Reverend Joseph Blount Cheshire. The main block of the church measures 20 feet by 50 feet. It has a small gable narthex and features lancet windows. It is the oldest church building in Mount Airy.

It was added to the National Register of Historic Places in 1986. It is located in the Mount Airy Historic District.
