= Emmett Forrest =

American friend of Andy Griffith

William Emmett Forrest, Jr. (September 3, 1927 – January 12, 2013) was an American pop culture collector, museum founder, and longtime friend of actor Andy Griffith. Forrest was an extensive collector of memorabilia spanning Griffith's career. He persuaded Andy Griffith to donate set pieces and other items from the Andy Griffith Show. Forrest used his collection to found the Andy Griffith Museum in Mount Airy, North Carolina, which opened to the public on September 26, 2009.

Forrest was born in Gaston County, North Carolina, on September 3, 1927, William Emmett Forrest, Sr. and Margaret Haynes Forrest. He served in the United States Navy during World War II. He worked for the Pike Electric Company during his professional career. Forrest became involved with the Surry Arts Council following his retirement, which would lead to the Andy Griffith Museum years later.

Forrest and Andy Griffith were longtime friends and he devoted much of his life preserving items from Griffith's career, with Griffith's approval. Forrest partnered with the Surry Arts Council to plan a museum dedicated to Griffith career, one of Hollywood's best known actors, singer, and television producers. A potential museum was in the planning stages for more than twenty-five years. Forrest's vast array of memorabilia formed the basis for the Andy Griffith Museum permanent collection, which he opened in Mount Airy, North Carolina, in 2009. The 2,500-square-foot museum, located less than a mile from Griffith's childhood home, cost approximately $500,000 to construct. According to Griffith's widow, Cindi Griffith, Forrest made no financial gain from donating his collection to the museum.

Emmett Forrest died from a long illness on the morning of January 12, 2013, at the Joan and Howard Woltz Hospice Home in Dobson, North Carolina, at the age of 85. He was predeceased by his wife, Barbara King Forrest, and survived by two daughters and a son.
