= Mount Airy Historic District (Mount Airy, North Carolina) =

Historic district in North Carolina, United States

- U.S. National Register of Historic Places
- U.S. Historic district
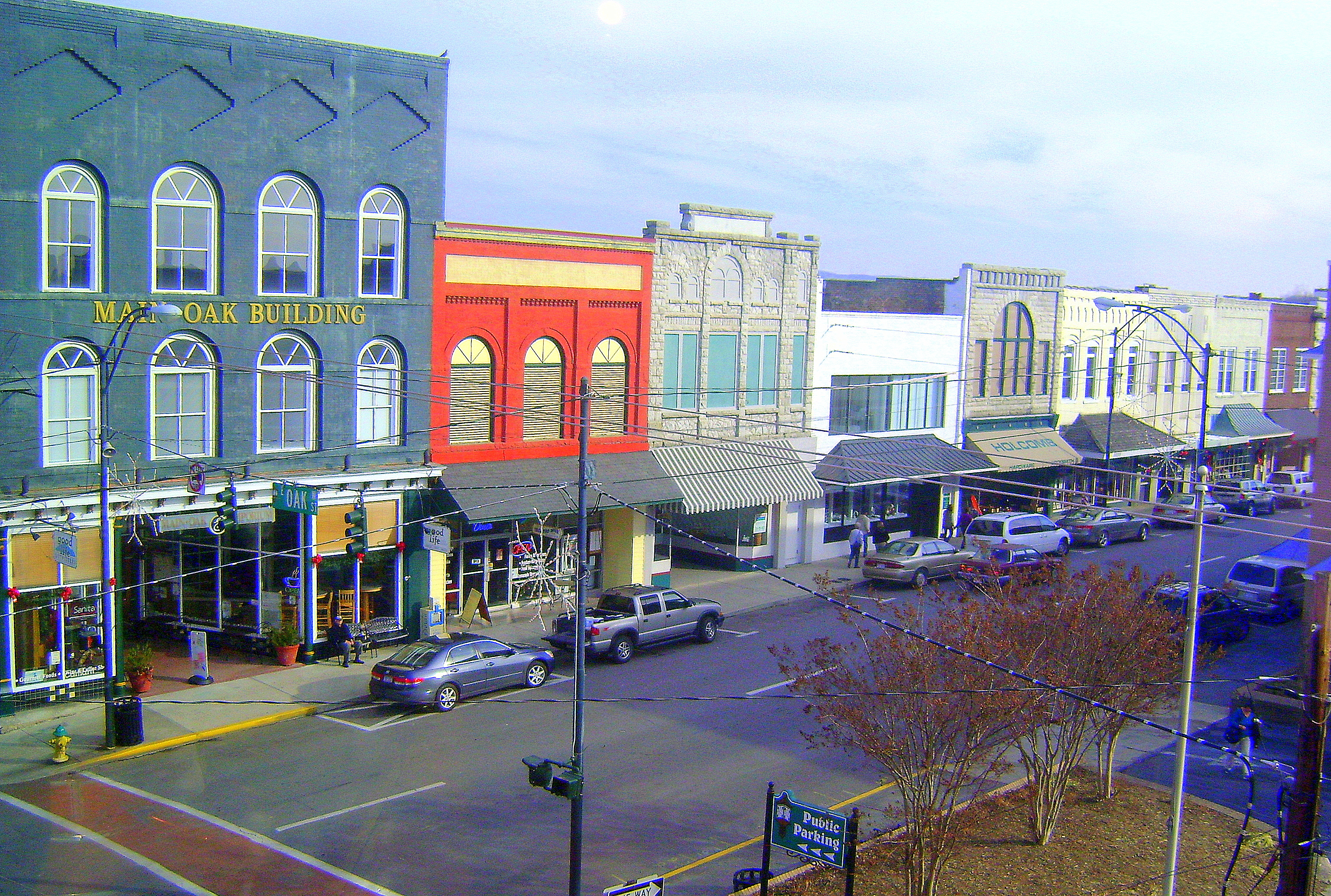
- Mount Airy Historic District, January 2011

- Location within North Carolina Location within the United States
- Location: Main, Brown, Market, Franklin, W. Pine, Rockford, Worth, Cherry, and Gilmer Sts., Moore, and Hines Aves.; Willow & W. Oak Sts., Mount Airy, North Carolina
- Coordinates: 36°29′59″N 80°36′25″W
- Area: 115 acres (47 ha)
- Architect: Multiple
- Architectural style: Late 19th And 20th Century Revivals, Bungalow/craftsman, Late Victorian
- NRHP reference No.: 85002931 (original); 12000581 (increase); 100006394 (decrease)

Significant dates
- Added to NRHP: October 3, 1985, August 28, 2012 (Boundary Increase)
- Boundary increase: August 28, 2012
- Boundary decrease: April 9, 2021

Mount Airy Historic District is a national historic district located at Mount Airy, Surry County, North Carolina. The district encompasses 187 contributing buildings in the central business district and surrounding industrial and residential sections of Mount Airy. They were primarily built between about 1880 and 1930 and include notable examples of Late Victorian and Bungalow / American Craftsman architecture. Located in the district are the separately listed W. F. Carter House and Trinity Episcopal Church. Other notable buildings include the Abram Haywood Merritt House (1902), William A. Estes House (c. 1875), Thomas Fawcett House (c. 1895), J. D. Sargent House (1919), Campbell A. Baird House (1913), T. Benton Ashby House (c. 1912), First Baptist Church (1906-1912), Mount Airy Friends (1904), Presbyterian Church (1907-1914), Merritt Building (c. 1905-1910), Banner Building (1906), Prather Block (c. 1892), Midkiff Hardware Store (c. 1910), Welch Block (c. 1890), West Drug Store (c. 1895), Belk's Building (c. 1890), (former) Workman's Federal Savings and Loan (c. 1891), (former) First National Bank (1893), Bank of Mount Airy (1923), U.S. Post Office (1932-1933), and the Sparger Brothers Tobacco Factory.

It was added to the National Register of Historic Places in 1985, with a boundary increase in 2012, and a boundary decrease in 2021.

== Gallery ==
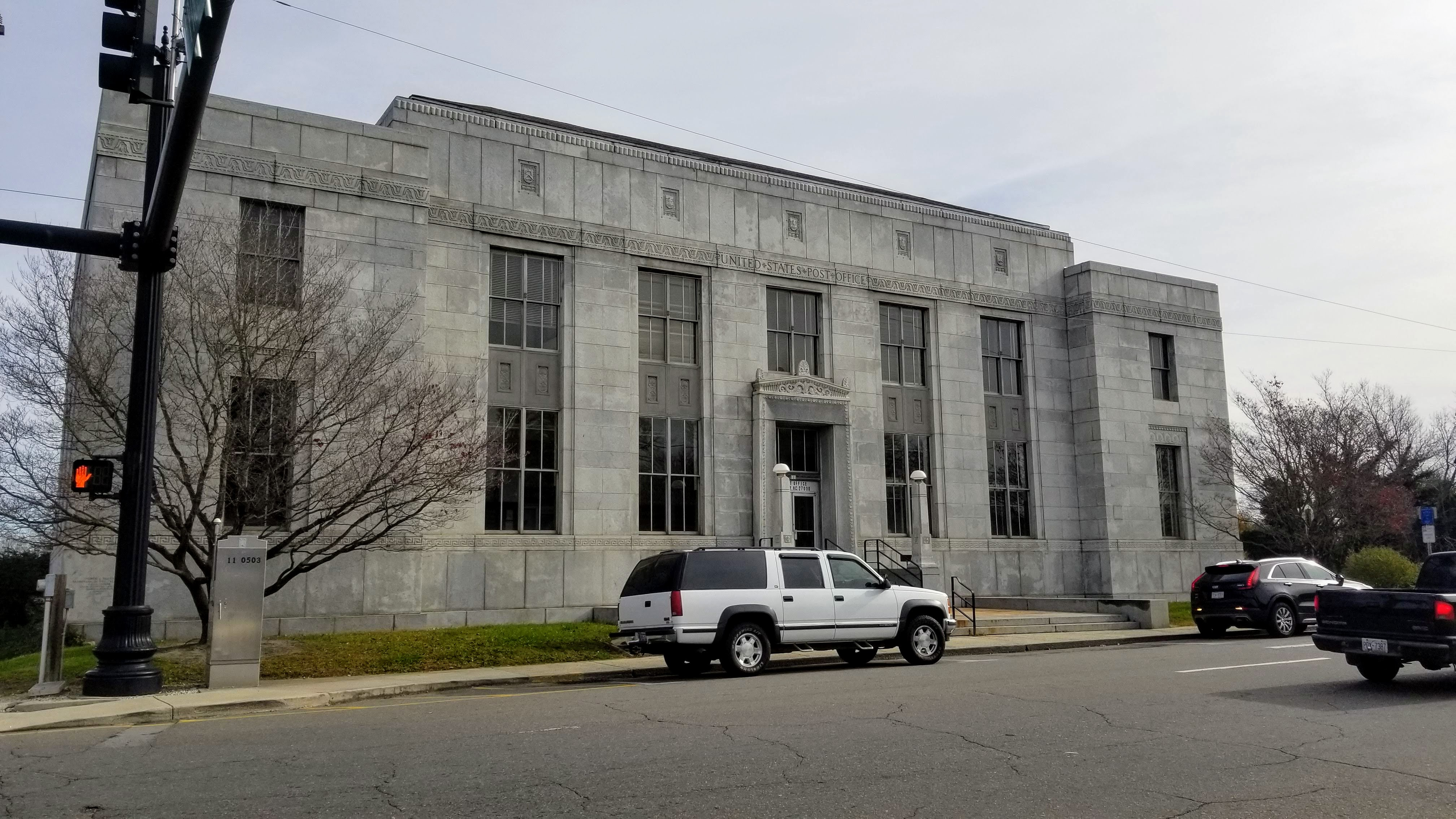
United States Post Office, 2020

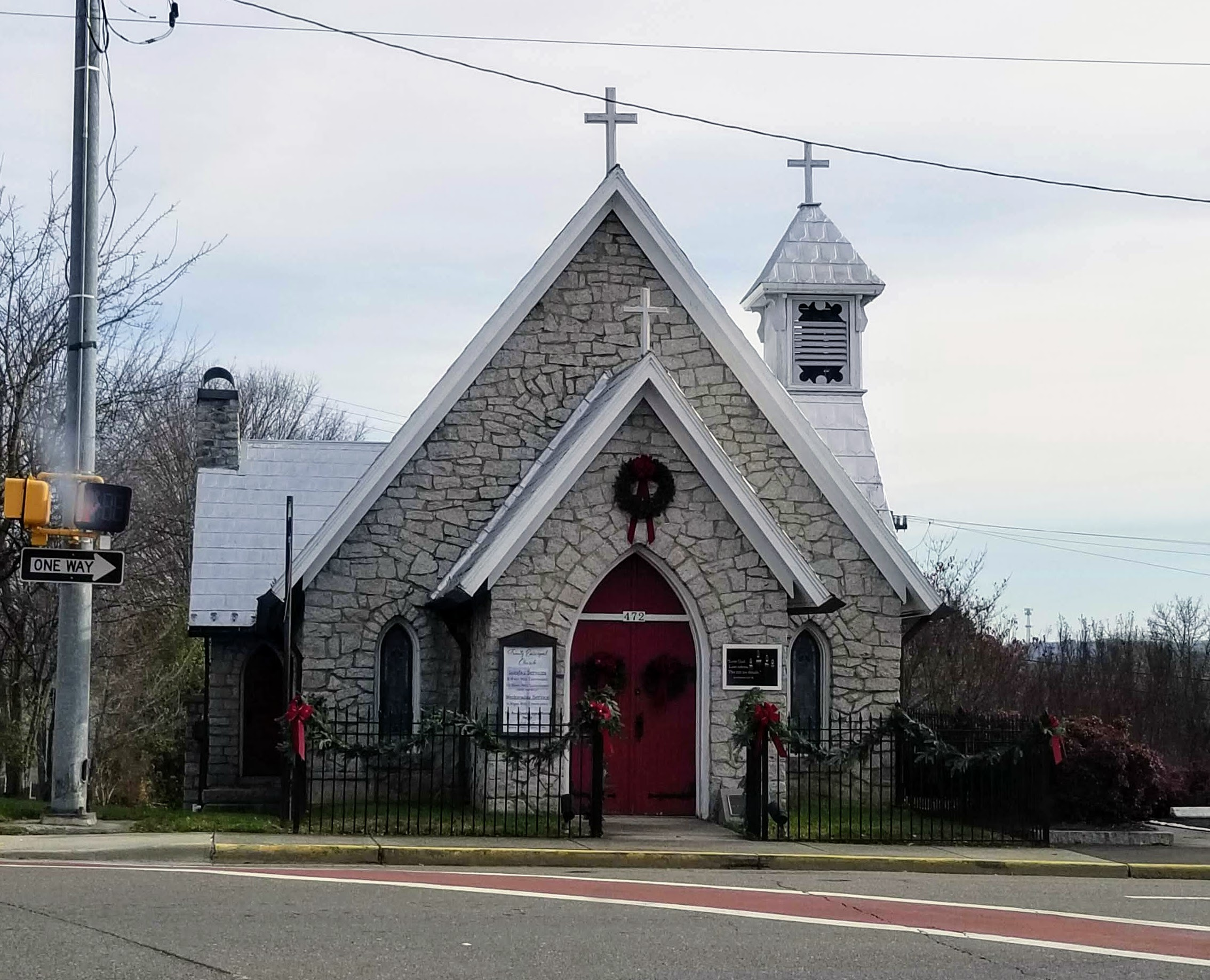
Trinity Episcopal Church, 2020

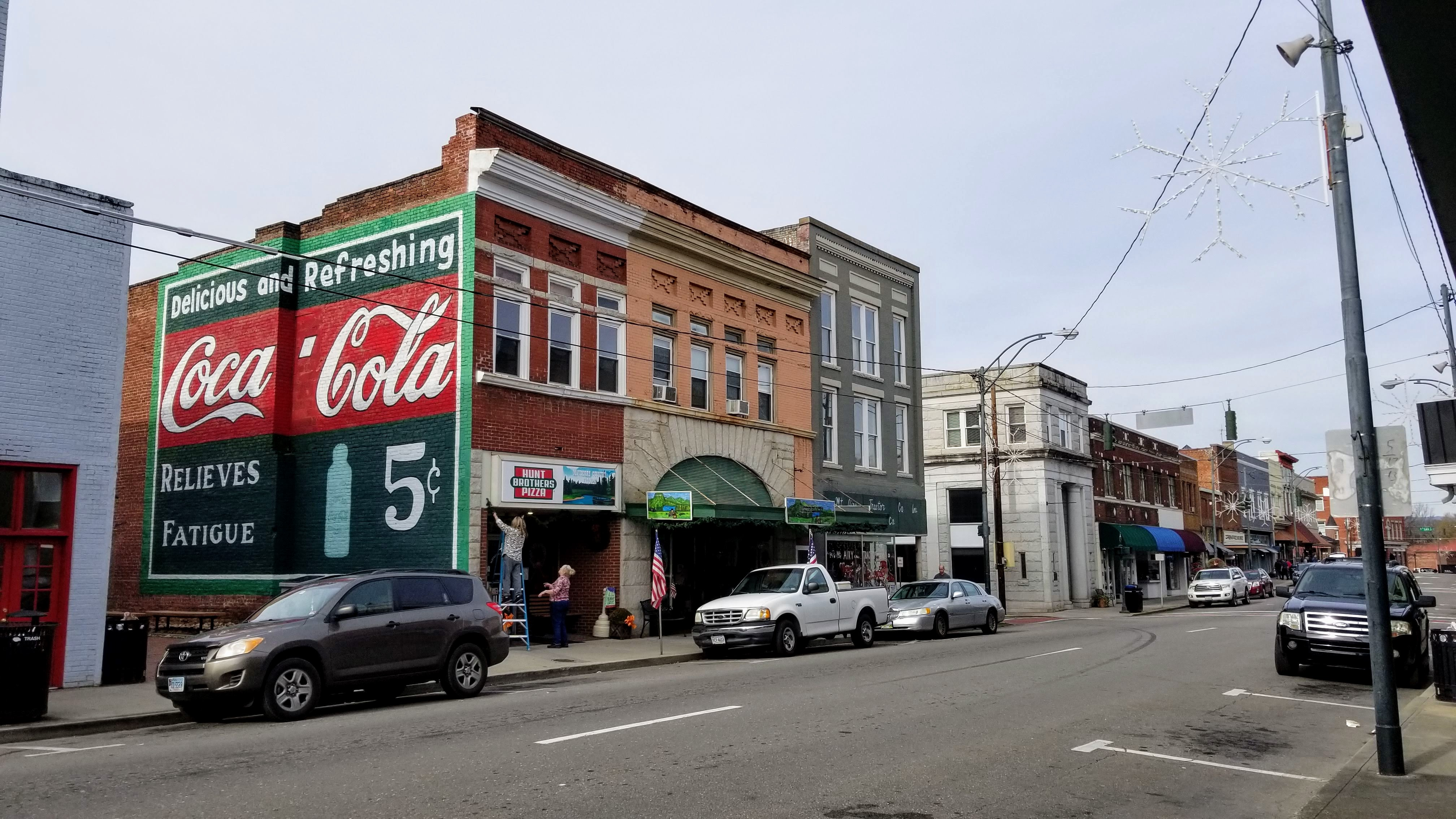
N. Main Street Buildings, 2020

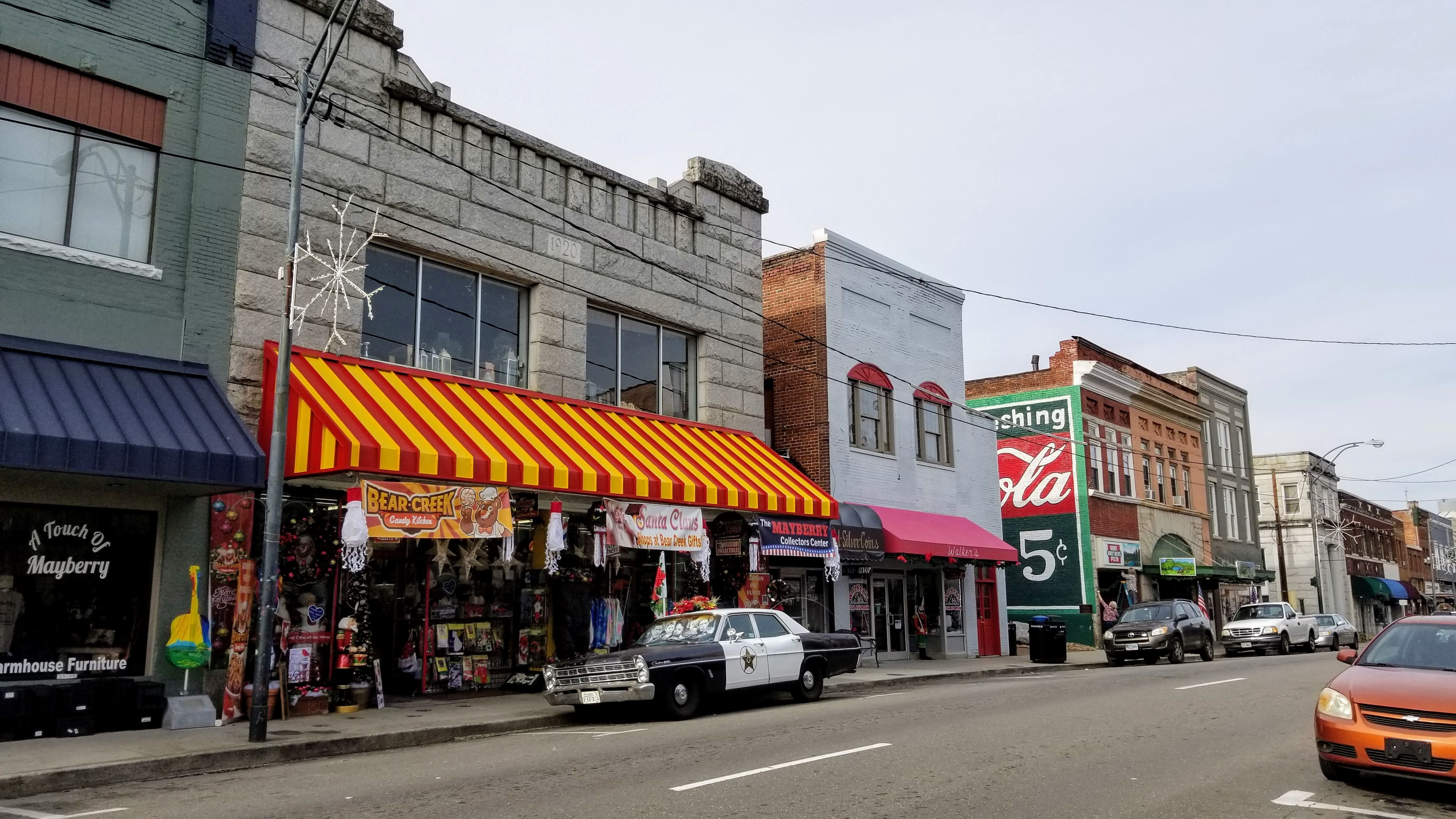
N. Main Street Buildings, 2020

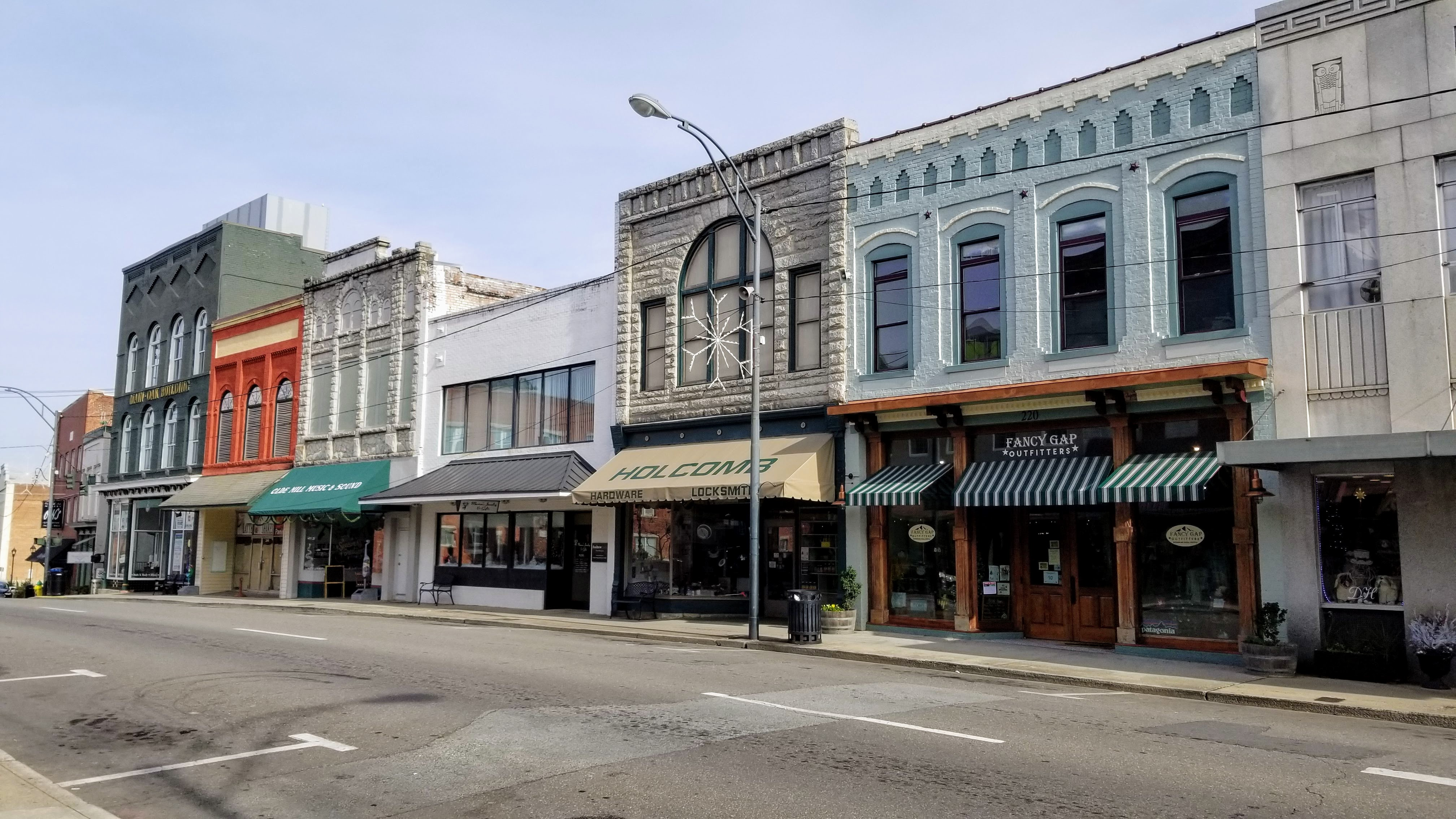
N. Main Street Buildings, 2020

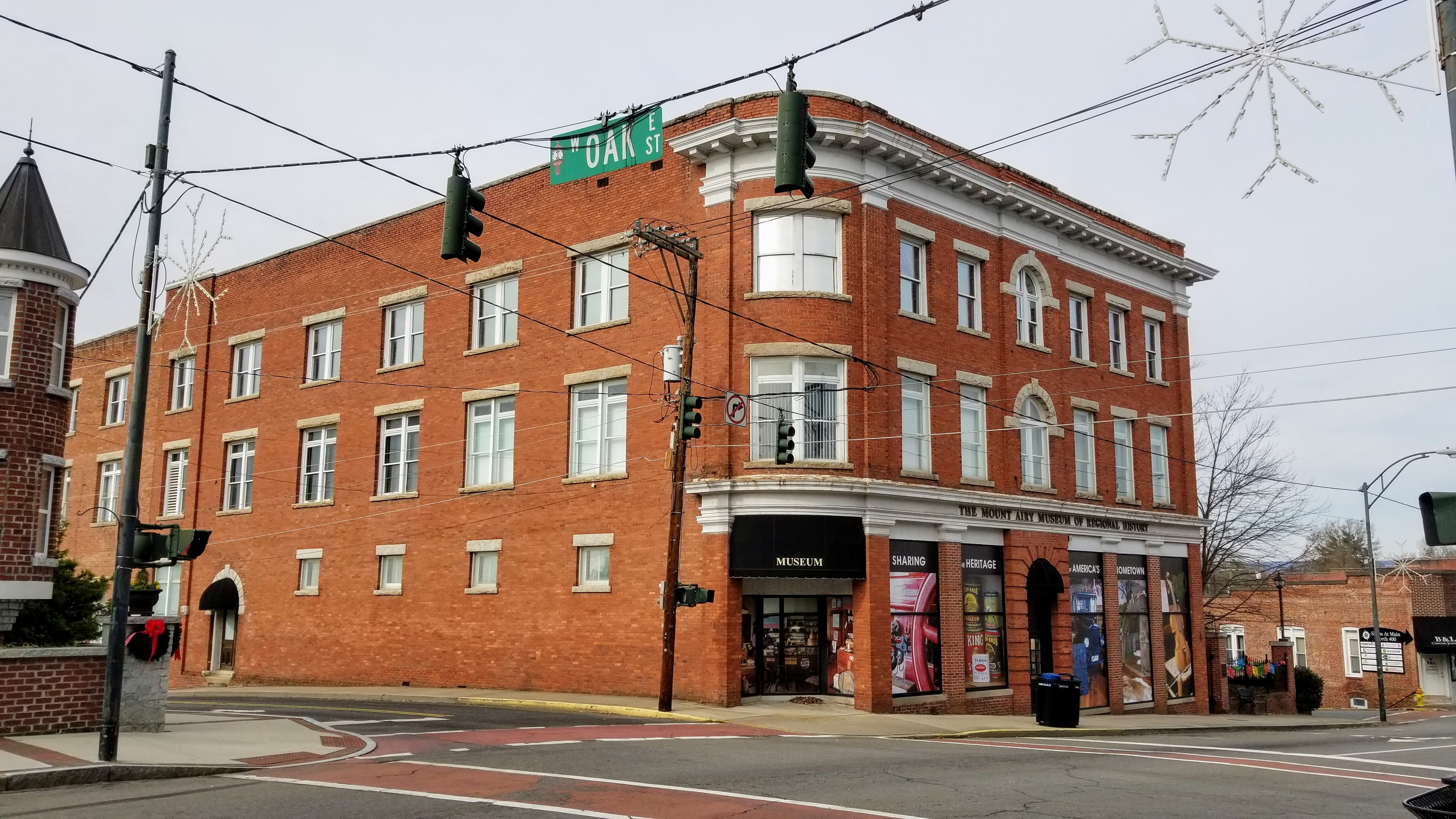
Merritt Building, 2020

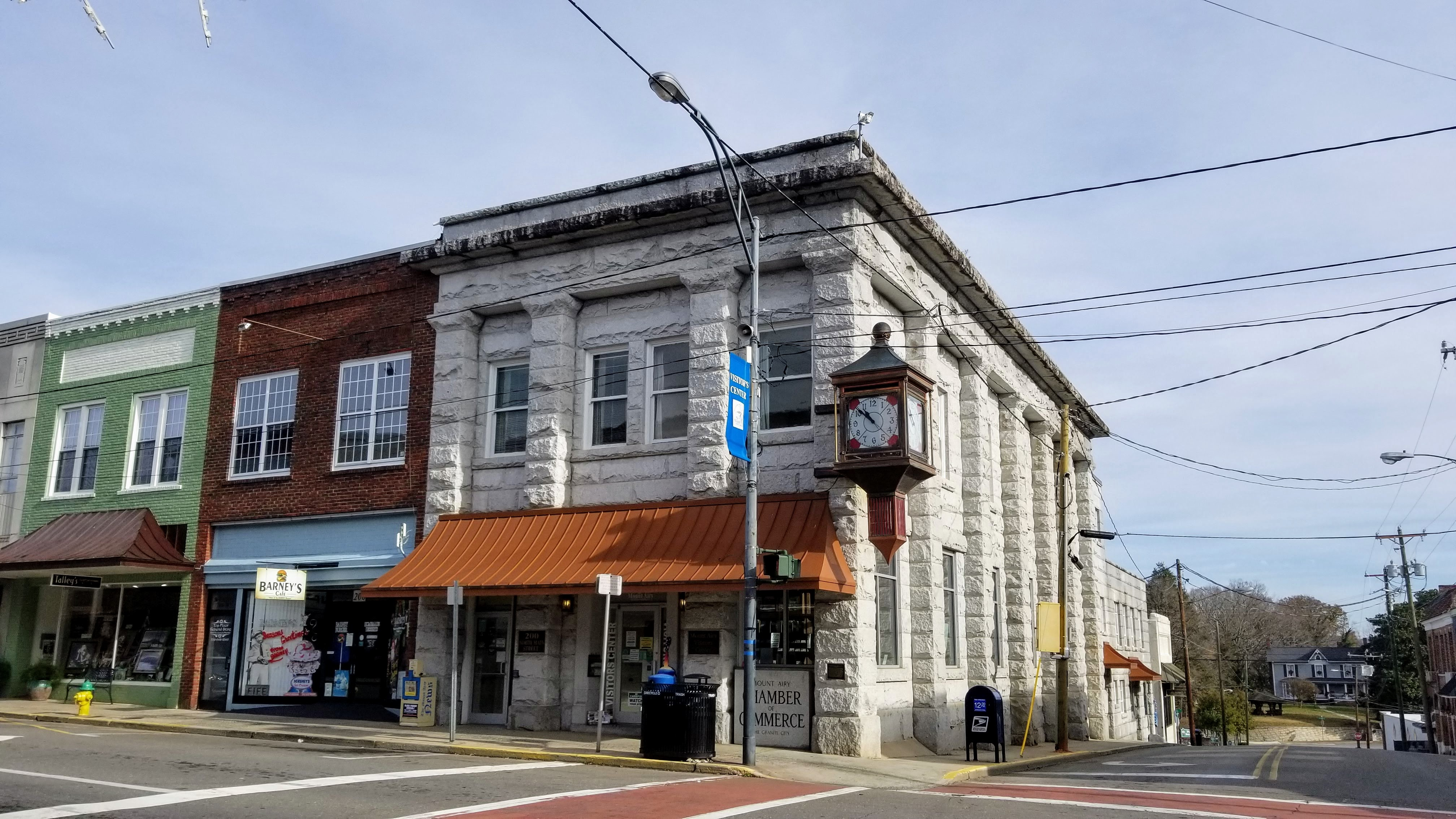
Former First National Bank, 2020

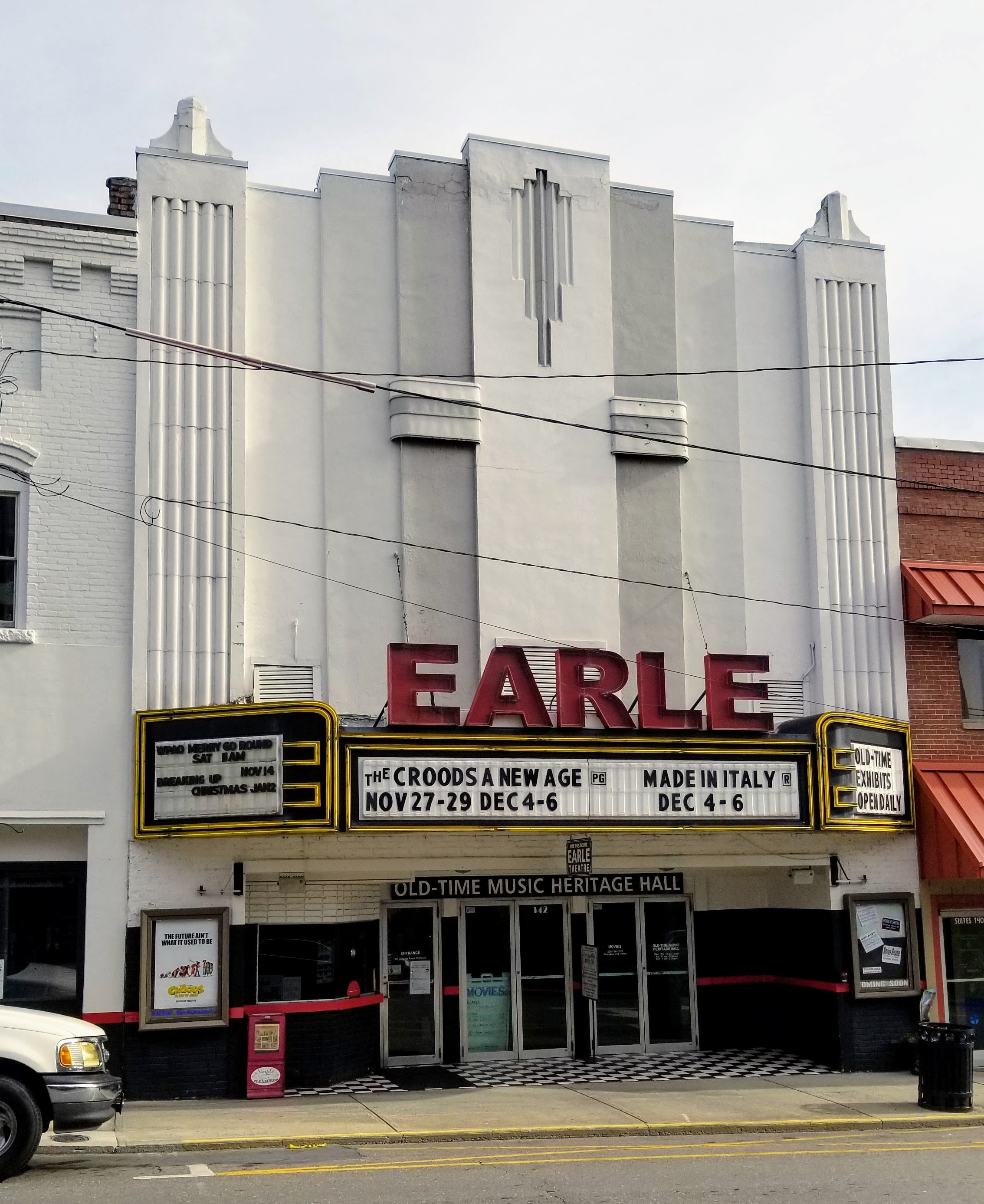
Earle Theater, 2020

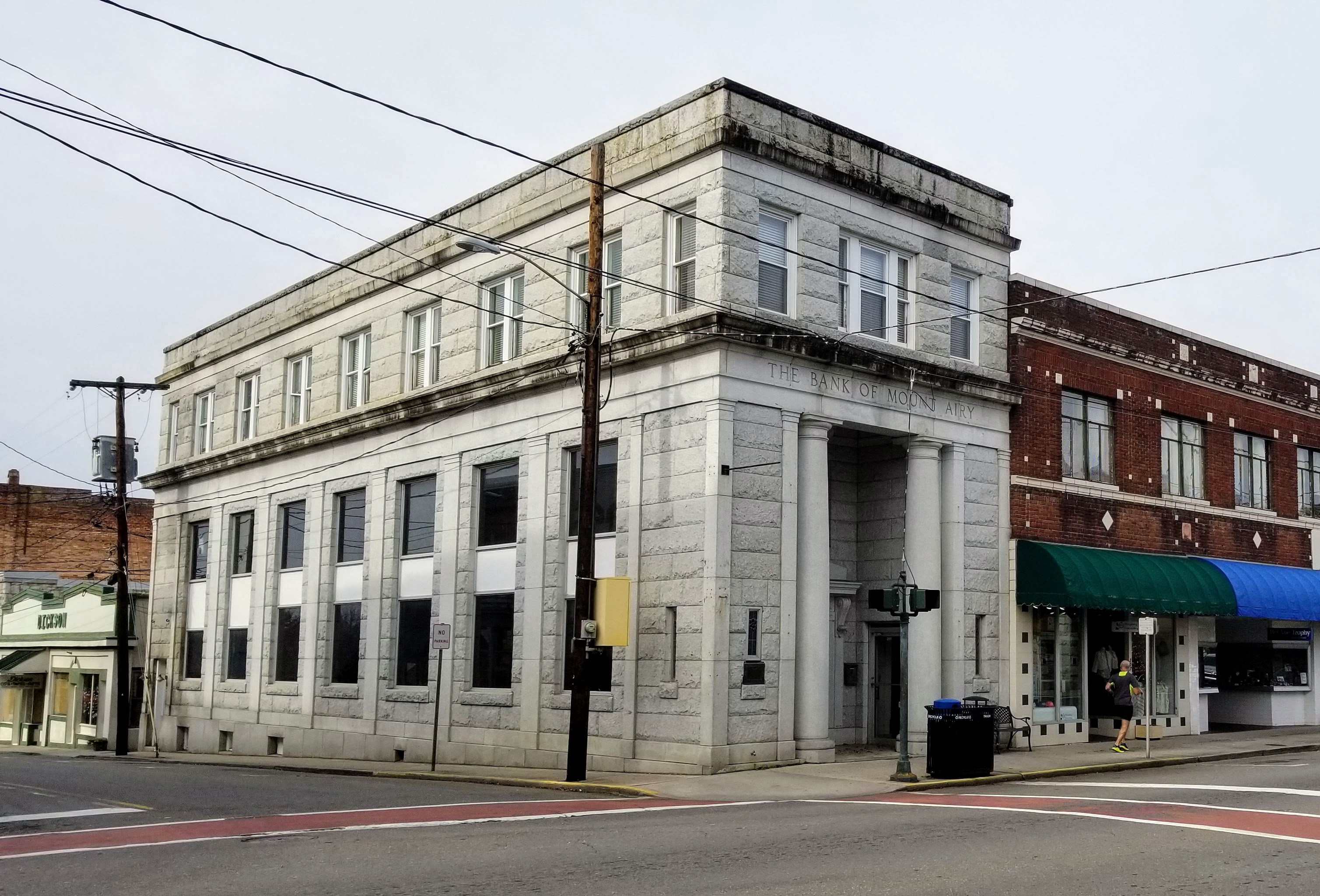
Bank of Mount Airy, 2020
