= Renfro Mill =

Historic mill building in North Carolina, US

- U.S. National Register of Historic Places
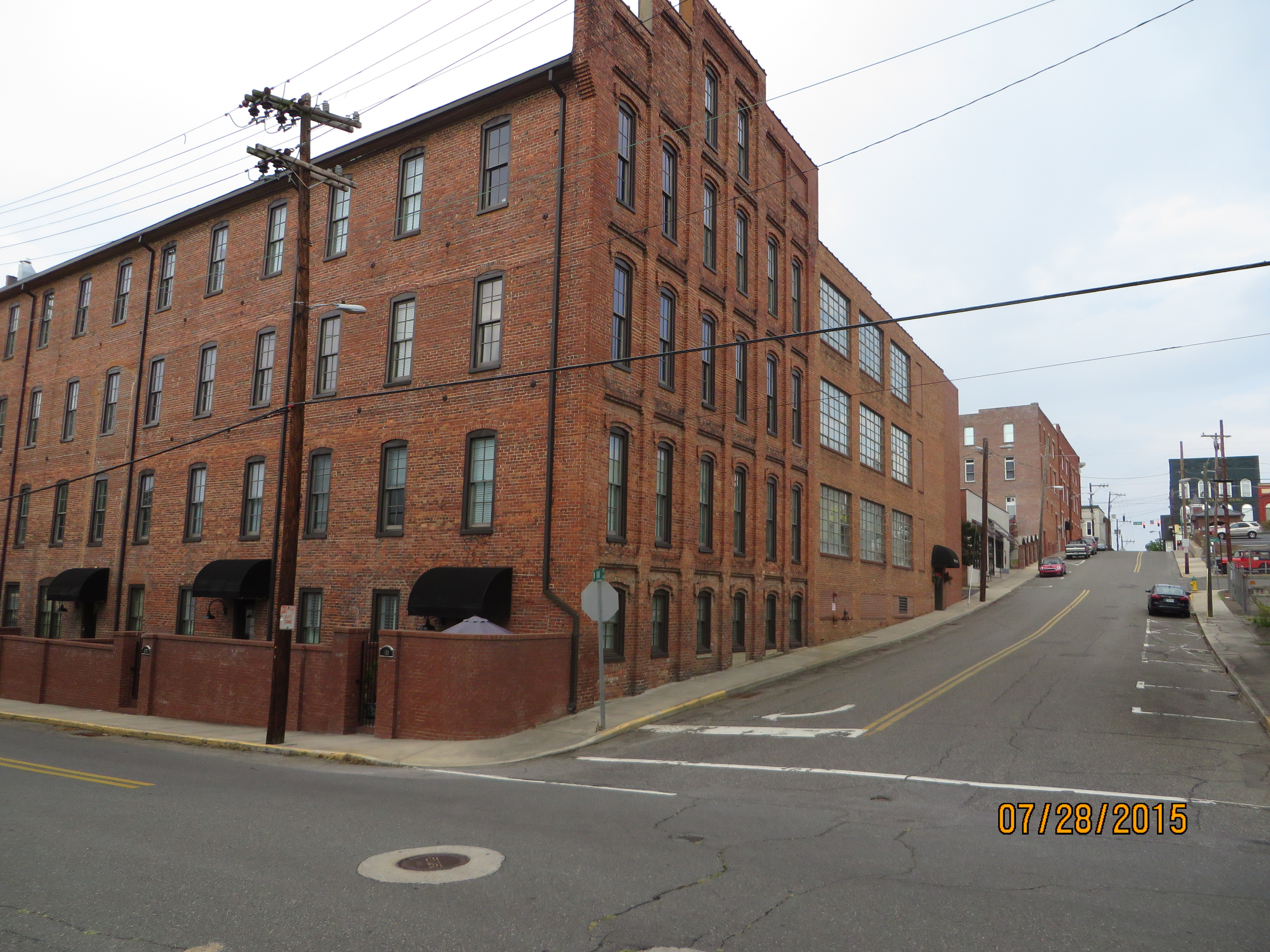

- Location within North Carolina Location within the United States
- Location: Jct. of Willow and Oak Sts. Mount Airy, North Carolina
- Coordinates: 36°30′5″N 80°36′36″W
- Area: less than one acre
- Built: c. 1893, 1946-1947
- Architectural style: Late Victorian
- NRHP reference No.: 00001208
- Added to NRHP: October 12, 2000

Renfro Mill, also known as R. Roberts Leaf Tobacco House, is a historic industrial building located at Mount Airy, Surry County, North Carolina. The original section was built as a tobacco barn about 1893. The largest addition was built in 1946–1947. It is a one- to 4 1/2-story, brick, concrete, steel, wood, and granite industrial building encompassing 100,000 square feet of space. It was originally built to house a tobacco leaf house, and after 1921 the Renfro company, a sock manufacturer. The mill closed in 1997.

It was listed on the National Register of Historic Places in 2000.
