= Oak Grove, Surry County, North Carolina =

Coordinates: 36°29′02″N 80°45′25″W

Oak Grove, North Carolina
- Unincorporated community
- Interactive map of Oak Grove, North Carolina
- Country: United States
- State: North Carolina
- Counties: Surry
- Time zone: Eastern (EST)
- Area code: 336

Oak Grove is an unincorporated community in northern Surry County, North Carolina, United States, located near Bottom.

== Geography ==
It is located between the Wood Fork Branch and the Little Fisher River (Powell 1968, p. 359). Roughly centered on the intersection of Oak Grove Church Road and West Pine Street (North Carolina Highway 89), the community lies in the vicinity of the N.C. Highway 89 interchange with Interstate 77. Prominent landmarks include Oak Grove Baptist Church.

== Architectural significance ==
Haystack Farm, an example of Italianate architecture from the late 19th century on the National Register of Historic Places, is located here.

== Other places called Oak Grove in Surry County ==
Oak Grove (36.490, -80.575) is also the name of a small community on North Carolina Highway 89 (Westfield Road) near Bannertown. This Oak Grove is named for the Oak Grove United Methodist Church located here.
