= Edgar Harvey Hennis House =

Historic house in North Carolina, United States

- U.S. National Register of Historic Places
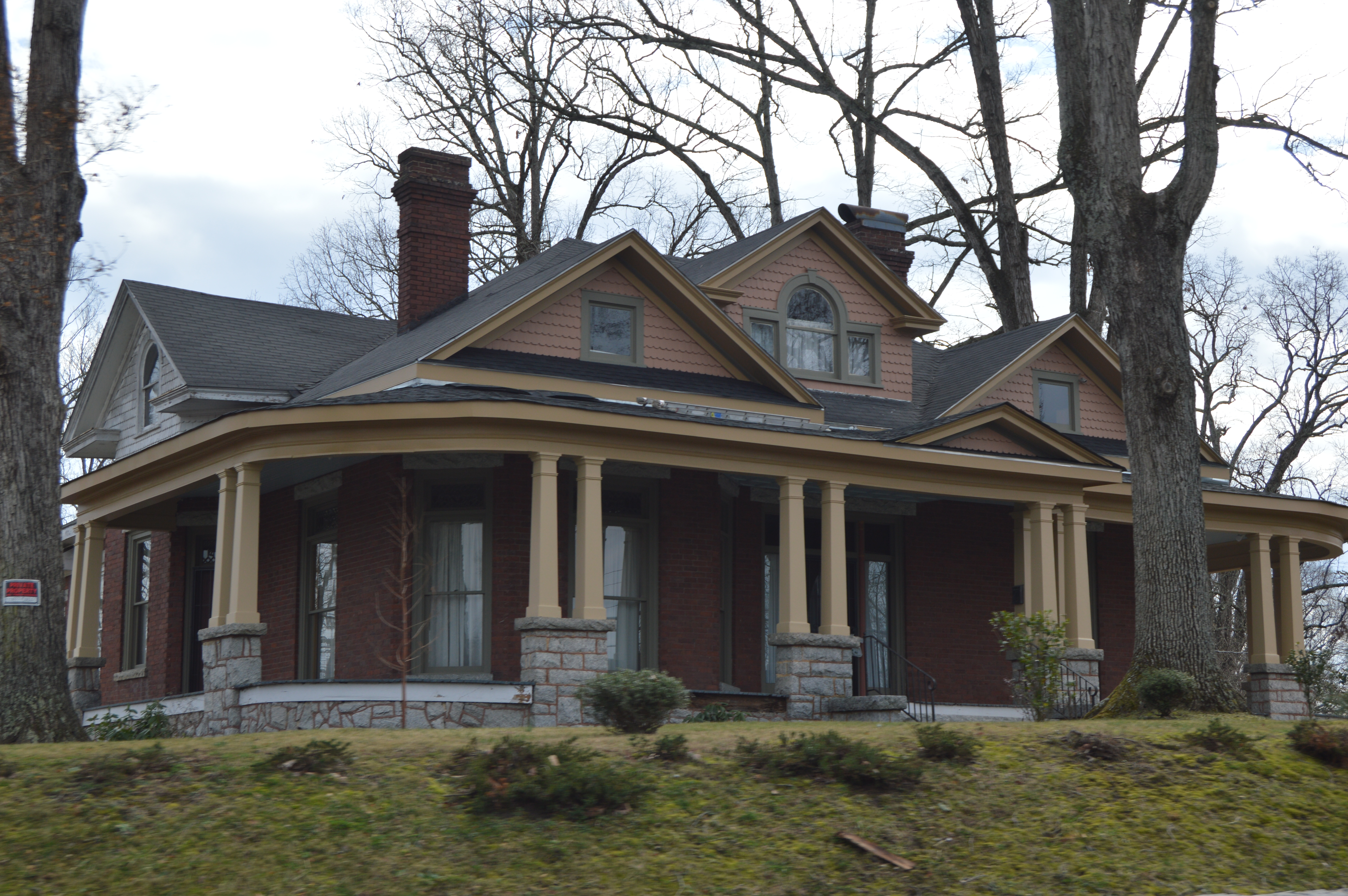
- Front and northern side

- Location within North Carolina Location within the United States
- Location: 1056 N. Main St., Mount Airy, North Carolina
- Coordinates: 36°30′43″N 80°36′29″W
- Area: less than one acre
- Built: 1909
- Architectural style: Colonial Revival, Late Victorian
- NRHP reference No.: 86000318
- Added to NRHP: February 20, 1986

Edgar Harvey Hennis House is a historic home located at Mount Airy, Surry County, North Carolina. It was built in 1909, and is a 1 1/2-story, three bay by eight bay, Late Victorian/Colonial Revival-style brick veneer dwelling. It has a two-story rear ell with two-tier porch, a hipped roof with multiple projecting gables, four corbelled interior chimneys, and a wraparound porch.

It was listed on the National Register of Historic Places in 1986.
