= Bank of Pilot Mountain =

Historic bank building in North Carolina, US

- U.S. National Register of Historic Places
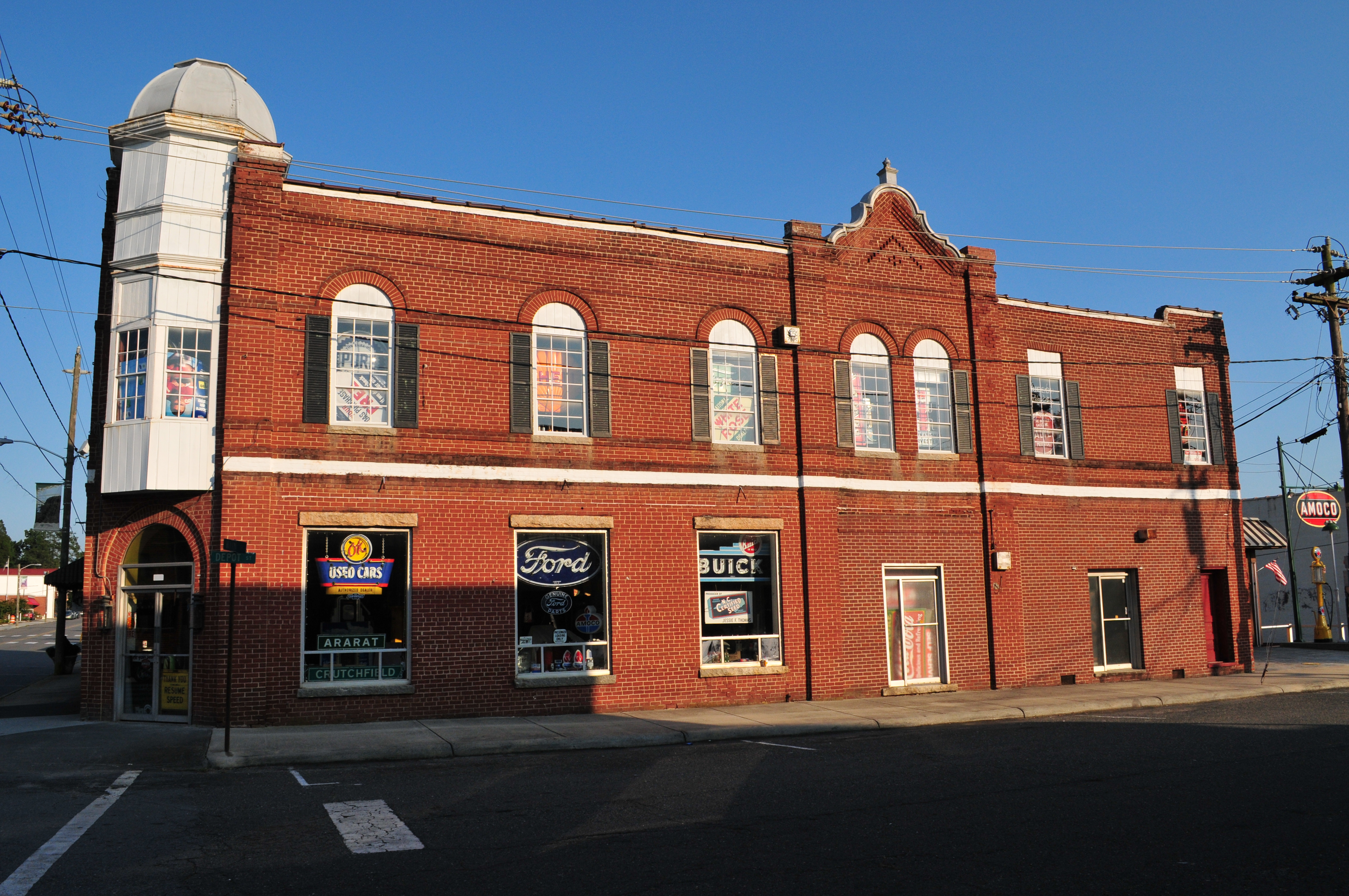
- Bank of Pilot Mountain, August 2013

- Location within North Carolina Location within the United States
- Location: 100 East Main Street, Pilot Mountain, North Carolina
- Coordinates: 36°23′5″N 80°28′1″W
- Area: less than one acre
- Built: 1900
- Architectural style: Queen Anne
- NRHP reference No.: 97001497
- Added to NRHP: December 1, 1997

Bank of Pilot Mountain is a historic bank building in Pilot Mountain, North Carolina. It was built in 1900, and is a two-story, five-bay-by-seven-bay, rectangular Queen Anne–style red brick building. It has round-arched brickwork at the entrance topped by a domed turret. It originally housed the Pilot Bank and Trust Company, then the Bank of Pilot Mountain from 1914 to 1986.

It was listed on the National Register of Historic Places in 1997.
