= Pilot Mountain, North Carolina =

Town in North Carolina

- Town
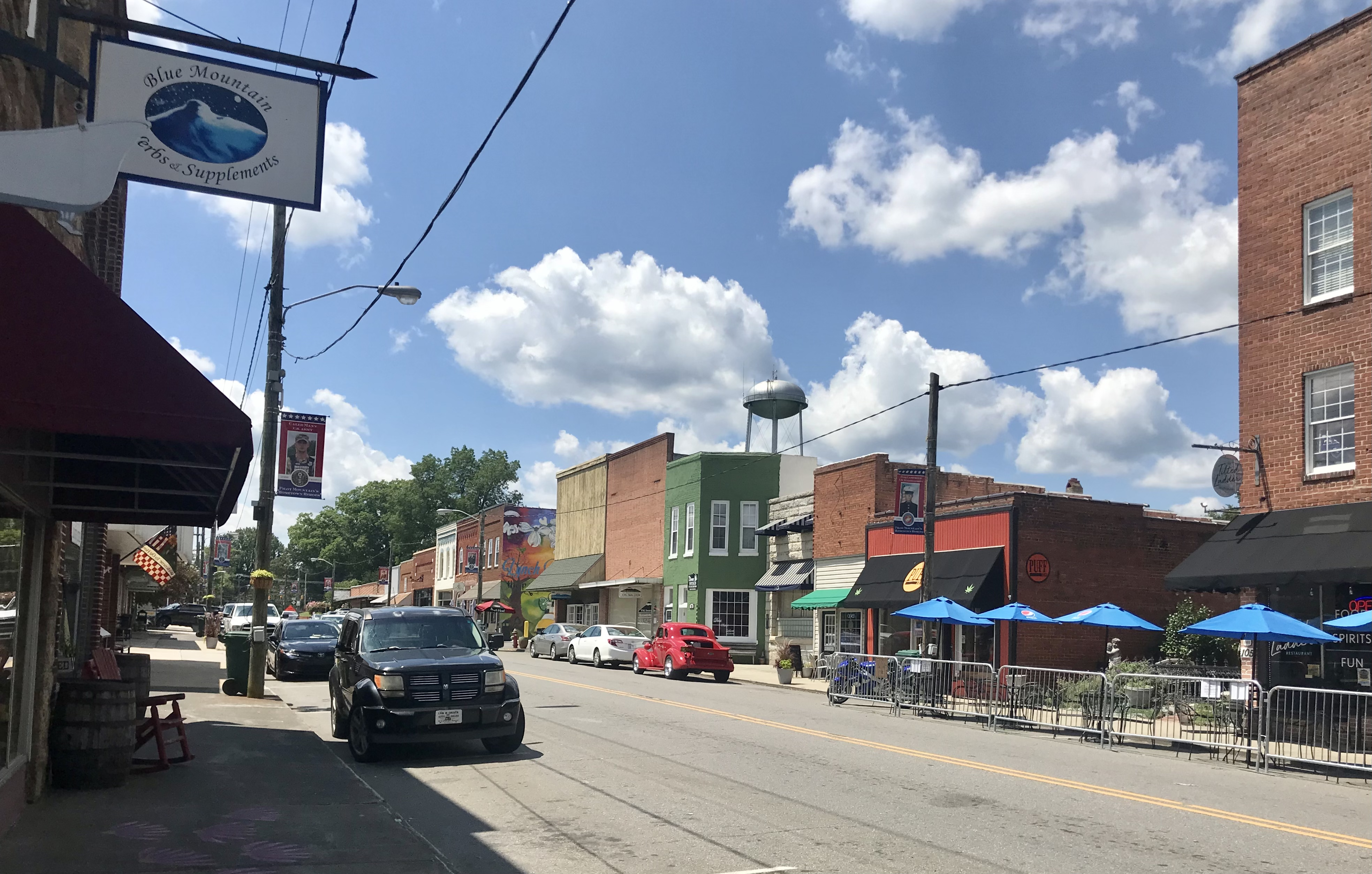
- West Main Street

- Flag Seal

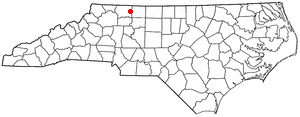
- Location of Pilot Mountain, North Carolina
- Coordinates: 36°23′08″N 80°28′25″W
- Country: United States
- State: North Carolina
- County: Surry

Area
  - Total: 2.06 sq mi (5.33 km^{2})
  - Land: 2.03 sq mi (5.27 km^{2})
  - Water: 0.023 sq mi (0.06 km^{2})
- Elevation: 1,099 ft (335 m)

Population (2020)
  - Total: 1,440
  - Density: 707.3/sq mi (273.08/km^{2})
- Time zone: UTC-5 (Eastern (EST))
  - Summer (DST): UTC-4 (EDT)
- ZIP code: 27041
- Area code: 336
- FIPS code: 37-51820
- GNIS feature ID: 2407111
- Website: https://www.pilotmountainnc.org/

Pilot Mountain is a town in Surry County, North Carolina, United States. The population was 1,443 at the 2020 census. It is named for the nearby landmark of Pilot Mountain, a distinctive geological formation.

== History ==
The Bank of Pilot Mountain was listed on the National Register of Historic Places in 1997.

Pilot Mountain inspired the town of Mount Pilot, a larger town near Mayberry, in The Andy Griffith Show.

== Geography ==
According to the United States Census Bureau, the town has a total area of 1.7 square miles (4.4 km^{2}), all land.

== Demographics ==
Historical population
Census	Pop.	Note	%±
1900	710		—
1910	652		−8.2%
1920	707		8.4%
1930	1,010		42.9%
1940	925		−8.4%
1950	1,092		18.1%
1960	1,310		20.0%
1970	1,309		−0.1%
1980	1,090		−16.7%
1990	1,181		8.3%
2000	1,281		8.5%
2010	1,477		15.3%
2020	1,440		−2.5%
2021 (est.)	1,436	▼	−0.3%
U.S. Decennial Census

=== 2020 census ===
Pilot Mountain racial composition
Race	Number	Percentage
White (non-Hispanic)	1,212	84.17%
Black or African American (non-Hispanic)	101	7.01%
Native American	5	0.35%
Asian	13	0.9%
Other/Mixed	75	5.21%
Hispanic or Latino	34	2.36%

As of the 2020 United States census, there were 1,440 people, 715 households, and 455 families residing in the town.

=== 2000 census ===
As of the census of 2000, there were 1,281 people, 585 households, and 363 families residing in the town. The population density was 742.3 inhabitants per square mile (286.6/km^{2}). There were 644 housing units at an average density of 373.2 per square mile (144.1/km^{2}). The racial makeup of the town was 87.82% White, 9.29% African American, 0.16% Native American, 0.47% Asian, 0.86% from other races, and 1.41% from two or more races. Hispanic or Latino of any race were 1.25% of the population.

There were 585 households, out of which 25.5% had children under the age of 18 living with them, 45.3% were married couples living together, 14.7% had a female householder with no husband present, and 37.8% were non-families. 34.5% of all households were made up of individuals, and 15.7% had someone living alone who was 65 years of age or older. The average household size was 2.19 and the average family size was 2.81.

In the town, the population was spread out, with 22.5% under the age of 18, 7.3% from 18 to 24, 27.3% from 25 to 44, 23.7% from 45 to 64, and 19.2% who were 65 years of age or older. The median age was 40 years. For every 100 females, there were 79.9 males. For every 100 females age 18 and over, there were 75.4 males.

The median income for a household in the town was $33,529, and the median income for a family was $42,279. Males had a median income of $31,522 versus $21,250 for females. The per capita income for the town was $18,526. About 11.9% of families and 15.5% of the population were below the poverty line, including 25.1% of those under age 18 and 17.2% of those age 65 or over.
