= Haystack Farm =

Historic farm in North Carolina, United States

- U.S. National Register of Historic Places
- Location within North Carolina Location within the United States
- Location: South of Oak Grove on SR 1480, near Oak Grove, North Carolina
- Coordinates: 36°27′31″N 80°44′56″W
- Area: 12.2 acres (4.9 ha)
- Built: 1885
- Architectural style: Italianate
- NRHP reference No.: 82001306
- Added to NRHP: December 2, 1982

Haystack Farm is a historic home and farm located near Oak Grove, Surry County, North Carolina. The farmhouse was built about 1885, and is a two-story, three-bay, gable roofed frame dwelling with a two-story rear ell. It has a full-width, hip roofed front porch and Italianate style design elements. Also on the property are the contributing gambrel-roof livestock barn, a board-and-batten frame packhouse, and a half-dovetail plank apple drying shed. The house was built by Christopher Wren Bunker, son of Chang and nephew of Eng Bunker.

It was listed on the National Register of Historic Places in 1982.
