= C. C. Cundiff House =

Historic house in North Carolina, United States

- U.S. National Register of Historic Places
- Location within North Carolina Location within the United States
- Location: SR 2230, near Siloam, North Carolina
- Coordinates: 36°17′1″N 80°35′12″W
- Area: 9.8 acres (4.0 ha)
- Built: c. 1865
- Architectural style: Greek Revival, Victorian
- NRHP reference No.: 83001918
- Added to NRHP: July 21, 1983

C. C. Cundiff House, also known as the Cundiff House, is a historic home located near Siloam, Surry County, North Carolina, United States. It was built about 1865, and is a two-story brick dwelling, with a low hipped roof and simple details of vernacular Greek Revival and later Victorian inspiration. It consists of two sections, one having four rooms and the other two rooms joined by a one-story shed-roofed front porch. Also on the property are the contributing well/wash house, smokehouse, privy, and family cemetery.

It was listed on the National Register of Historic Places in 1983.
