= Samuel Josiah Atkinson House =

Historic house in North Carolina, United States

- U.S. National Register of Historic Places
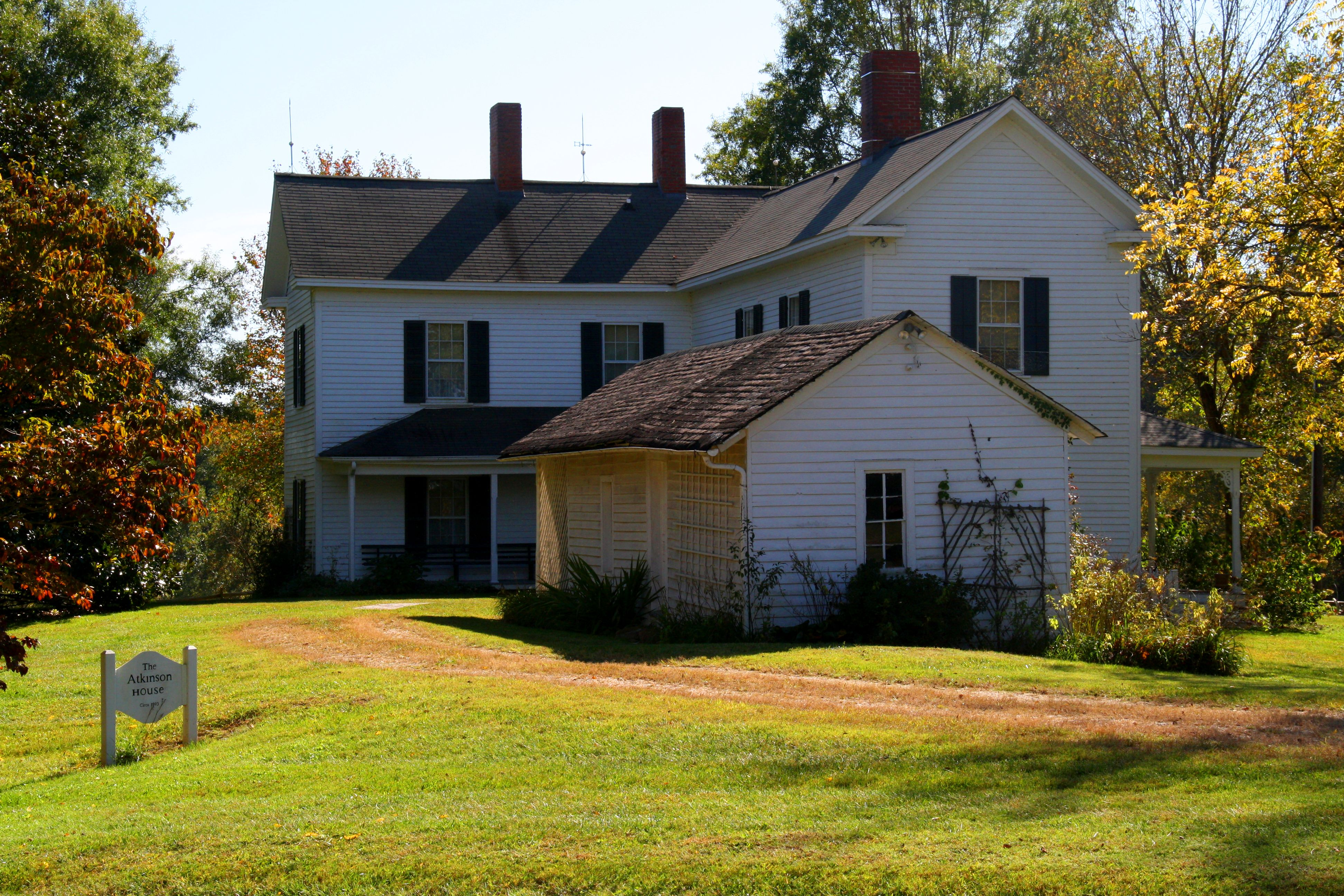
- Samuel Josiah Atkinson House, October 2014

- Location within North Carolina Location within the United States
- Location: 586 Atkinson Road, Siloam, North Carolina
- Coordinates: 36°17′41″N 80°33′40″W
- Area: 29.6 acres (12.0 ha)
- Built: 1893-1899
- Architectural style: Late Victorian; I-house
- NRHP reference No.: 12000217
- Added to NRHP: April 16, 2012

The Samuel Josiah Atkinson House (also known as Hogan Creek Farm) is a historic house and farm located at 586 Atkinson Road in Siloam, Surry County, North Carolina.

== Description and history ==
The farmhouse was built in 1893, and is a two-story, three-bay, Late Victorian frame I-house. The property also includes the contributing well house/smokehouse, wood shed, privy, tobacco pack house, corn crib, feed barn, two tobacco barns, and the Johnny Jones House (c. 1830), which was moved to the site in 2009.

It was listed on the National Register of Historic Places on April 16, 2012.
