= Siloam, North Carolina =

Siloam
- Unincorporated community
- Location within the state of North Carolina
- Country: United States
- State: North Carolina
- County: Surry
- Elevation: 833 ft (254 m)
- Time zone: UTC-5 (Eastern (EST))
  - Summer (DST): UTC-4 (EDT)
- Area code: 336
- GNIS feature ID: 994804

Siloam is an unincorporated community in southeastern Surry County, North Carolina, United States. The Yadkin River makes up the community's southern border, and the Ararat River flows between it and the community of Shoals to the east. It is a Piedmont Triad community.

The population of the ZIP Code Tabulation Area (ZCTA) for Siloam's ZIP code (27047) was 1,233 at the 2000 census.

== History ==
The community grew around Siloam Methodist Church, which was established in 1818. The church was named for the biblical Pool of Siloam.

A post office was established in Siloam in 1837.

The area began a period of growth in 1890 when it became a stop on the former Southern Railway. The Yadkin Valley Railroad, which runs just north of the Yadkin in Surry County, now uses the tracks.

The Samuel Josiah Atkinson House, C. C. Cundiff House, and Marion House and Marion Brothers Store are listed on the National Register of Historic Places.

=== Bridge collapse ===
Four people were killed and 16 people injured when the one-lane steel span bridge connecting Yadkin and Surry counties in Siloam collapsed on February 23, 1975. The collapse brought national attention to bridge safety and was reported in national magazines, including Reader's Digest, and on The CBS Evening News.

The Atkinson-Needham Memorial Bridge, which was built at the site of the old bridge, was named in honor of the four victims – Samuel Hugh and Ola Marion Atkinson and Judy Needham and her 3-year-old daughter, Andrea Lee. Among those rescued from the collapse was future Surry County Sheriff Graham Atkinson, who was 10 at the time.

According to a National Transportation Safety Board report, the accident started at approximately 9:25 p.m. when a car struck a timber railing on the bridge, causing the bridge to collapse in to the rain-swollen river. In heavy fog, six more vehicles within a 17-minute period drove off the bridge.

By the 1970s, state officials had hung a sign on the second-hand bridge that read, "Local Traffic Only."

The bridge, which had originally been used near High Rock Lake, was reassembled in Siloam in 1938. It was listed as deficient and needing repair or replacement in a 1974 state report. Troy Doby, the state secretary of transportation, said later that "it should have been replaced, but it was a question of money."

Weeks before the collapse, Hugh Atkinson had urged state officials to tear it down. The Atkinson family later found a letter in his coat pocket that he had written to the governor's office urging action on the bridge.

== Demographics ==
As of the census of 2000, there were 1,233 people, 489 households, and 377 families residing in the ZCTA. There were 545 housing units. The racial makeup of the ZCTA was 97.73% White, 0.41% Black or African American, 0.16% Asian, 1.62% from other races, and 0.08% from two or more races. Hispanic or Latino of any race were 2.11% of the population.

There were 489 households, out of which 32.7% had children under the age of 18 living with them, 77.1% were married couples living together, 7.6% had a female householder with no husband present, and 22.9% were non-families. 20.2% of all households were made up of individuals, and 10.0% had someone living alone who was 65 years of age or older. The average household size was 2.52 and the average family size was 2.88.

In the ZCTA the population was spread out, with 23.4% under the age of 18, 11.2% from 18 to 24, 35.4% from 25 to 44, 24.8% from 45 to 64, and 11.1% who were 65 years of age or older. The median age was 36 years. For every 100 females, there were 106.2 males. For every 100 females age 18 and over, there were 100.0 males.

The median income for a household in the ZCTA was $36,719, and the median income for a family was $39,297. Males had a median income of $27,321 versus $26,350 for females. The per capita income for the ZCTA was $16,544. About 6.1% of families and 9.5% of the population were below the poverty line, including 13.1% of those under age 18 and 20.4% of those age 65 or over.
