= Mount Airy, North Carolina =

Mount Airy
- City
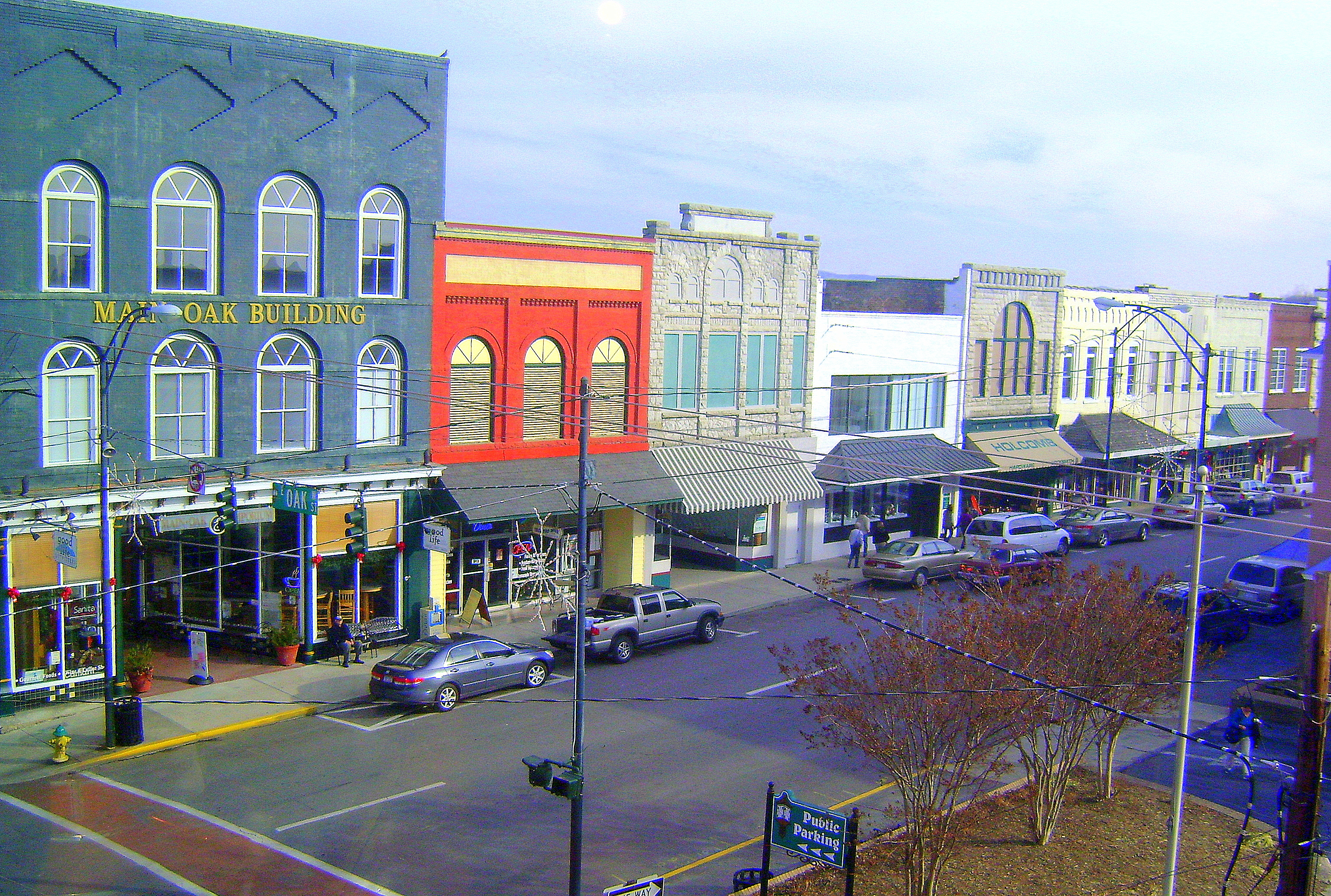
- Downtown Mount Airy (2011)

- Flag Seal
- Nicknames: Mayberry, The Granite City
- Location within the state of North Carolina
- Coordinates: 36°30′30″N 80°36′55″W
- Country: United States
- State: North Carolina
- County: Surry
- Settled: 1750s
- Incorporated: 1885

Government
  - Mayor: Jon Cawley

Area
  - Total: 11.86 sq mi (30.73 km^{2})
  - Land: 11.72 sq mi (30.35 km^{2})
  - Water: 0.15 sq mi (0.38 km^{2})
- Elevation: 1,096 ft (334 m)

Population (2020)
  - Total: 10,676
  - Estimate (2024): 10,621
  - Density: 911.2/sq mi (351.81/km^{2})
- Time zone: UTC−5 (Eastern (EST))
  - Summer (DST): UTC−4 (EDT)
- ZIP Codes: 27030–27031
- Area code: 336
- FIPS code: 37-44800
- GNIS feature ID: 2404317
- Website: www.mountairy.org

Mount Airy (/ˈmaʊntəri/) is a city in Surry County, North Carolina, United States. The city is located in the northwestern Piedmont Triad. As of the 2020 United States census, the city's population was 10,676. As of 2020, the city is the most populous municipality in Surry County. Mount Airy is located adjacent to the Winston-Salem Metropolitan Area, which is located west of the core central Greensboro-High Point Metropolitan Area.

== History ==
The region currently known as Mount Airy, North Carolina, was originally settled in the 1750s by predominantly English, Scotch-Irish, and German settlers. The native Cheraw people were known to inhabit the area prior to the arrival of these European settlers. As westward expansion progressed following the French and Indian War, Mount Airy started to develop, serving as a stagecoach stop on the road connecting Winston-Salem, North Carolina and Galax, Virginia. The city derived its name from a plantation in the vicinity.

Officially incorporated in 1885, Mount Airy quickly thrived due to the region's abundant natural resources, specifically granite and tobacco. This led to the establishment of the North Carolina Granite Corporation, the world's largest open-face granite quarry. The locally quarried granite has been used in famous structures, including the Wright Brothers National Memorial and the Arlington Memorial Bridge.

Mount Airy became a significant hub for the textile and furniture manufacturing industries in the late 19th and early 20th centuries. Companies such as Spencer's Incorporated and Renfro Corporation established mills in the city. However, the latter half of the 20th century brought economic challenges due to increased global competition and industry automation.

In 1977, Mount Airy established its official seal, representing the industries vital to its local economy: furniture manufacturing, textiles, tobacco, and granite quarrying.

Gaining fame as the birthplace of actor Andy Griffith and the believed inspiration for the fictional town of Mayberry in "The Andy Griffith Show," Mount Airy capitalized on its connection with the series. It established annual events like Mayberry Days and tourist attractions such as Floyd's Barber Shop and the Andy Griffith Museum.

In recognition of its vibrant community life and civic achievements, Mount Airy was named an All American City in 1994.

The W. F. Carter House, William Carter House, Edgar Harvey Hennis House, William Alfred Moore House, Mount Airy Historic District, North Carolina Granite Corporation Quarry Complex, Renfro Mill, and Trinity Episcopal Church are listed on the National Register of Historic Places.

== Geography ==
Mount Airy is located along the Ararat River, about 3 miles (4.8 km) south of the Virginia state line. The United States Census Bureau states the city has a total area of 8.4 square miles (22 km^{2}), all land. The city is located at the foothills of the Blue Ridge Mountains, approximately 14 miles (23 km) from the Blue Ridge Parkway. It has a humid subtropical climate (Cfa).

Climate data for Mount Airy, North Carolina (1991–2020 normals, extremes 1893–present)
| Month | Jan | Feb | Mar | Apr | May | Jun | Jul | Aug | Sep | Oct | Nov | Dec | Year |
|---|---|---|---|---|---|---|---|---|---|---|---|---|---|
| Record high °F (°C) | 79 (26) | 82 (28) | 89 (32) | 94 (34) | 98 (37) | 103 (39) | 105 (41) | 103 (39) | 101 (38) | 96 (36) | 86 (30) | 80 (27) | 105 (41) |
| Mean maximum °F (°C) | 66.7 (19.3) | 70.2 (21.2) | 77.8 (25.4) | 84.4 (29.1) | 88.6 (31.4) | 92.7 (33.7) | 94.2 (34.6) | 93 (34) | 90.2 (32.3) | 84.2 (29.0) | 75.6 (24.2) | 68.3 (20.2) | 95.3 (35.2) |
| Mean daily maximum °F (°C) | 47.0 (8.3) | 50.7 (10.4) | 58.4 (14.7) | 68.5 (20.3) | 76.0 (24.4) | 83.1 (28.4) | 86.3 (30.2) | 85.0 (29.4) | 79.3 (26.3) | 69.9 (21.1) | 59.3 (15.2) | 49.9 (9.9) | 67.8 (19.9) |
| Daily mean °F (°C) | 35.9 (2.2) | 38.7 (3.7) | 45.5 (7.5) | 54.6 (12.6) | 63.2 (17.3) | 71.0 (21.7) | 74.8 (23.8) | 73.5 (23.1) | 67.5 (19.7) | 56.5 (13.6) | 45.9 (7.7) | 38.7 (3.7) | 55.5 (13.1) |
| Mean daily minimum °F (°C) | 24.8 (−4.0) | 26.7 (−2.9) | 32.6 (0.3) | 40.7 (4.8) | 50.4 (10.2) | 58.9 (14.9) | 63.3 (17.4) | 62.1 (16.7) | 55.7 (13.2) | 43.1 (6.2) | 32.5 (0.3) | 27.5 (−2.5) | 43.2 (6.2) |
| Mean minimum °F (°C) | 9.6 (−12.4) | 13.6 (−10.2) | 18.5 (−7.5) | 27.3 (−2.6) | 35.8 (2.1) | 48.1 (8.9) | 55.0 (12.8) | 53.5 (11.9) | 42.3 (5.7) | 28.5 (−1.9) | 19.7 (−6.8) | 14.7 (−9.6) | 7.2 (−13.8) |
| Record low °F (°C) | −10 (−23) | −3 (−19) | 2 (−17) | 18 (−8) | 27 (−3) | 35 (2) | 43 (6) | 41 (5) | 32 (0) | 20 (−7) | 3 (−16) | −1 (−18) | −10 (−23) |
| Average precipitation inches (mm) | 3.99 (101) | 3.14 (80) | 4.19 (106) | 4.29 (109) | 4.53 (115) | 4.95 (126) | 5.24 (133) | 4.69 (119) | 4.26 (108) | 3.54 (90) | 3.44 (87) | 4.20 (107) | 50.46 (1,282) |
| Average snowfall inches (cm) | 3.1 (7.9) | 2.2 (5.6) | 1.2 (3.0) | 0.0 (0.0) | 0.0 (0.0) | 0.0 (0.0) | 0.0 (0.0) | 0.0 (0.0) | 0.0 (0.0) | 0.0 (0.0) | 0.0 (0.0) | 1.7 (4.3) | 8.2 (21) |
| Average precipitation days (≥ 0.01 in) | 11.0 | 10.3 | 11.6 | 11.7 | 13.0 | 12.8 | 13.6 | 12.8 | 10.8 | 8.9 | 9.3 | 11.5 | 137.3 |
| Average snowy days (≥ 0.1 in) | 1.3 | 1.4 | 0.5 | 0.0 | 0.0 | 0.0 | 0.0 | 0.0 | 0.0 | 0.0 | 0.0 | 0.7 | 3.9 |
Source: NOAA

== Demographics ==
Historical population
| Census | Pop. | Note | %± |
|---|---|---|---|
| 1880 | 519 | | — |
| 1890 | 1,768 | | 240.7% |
| 1900 | 2,680 | | 51.6% |
| 1910 | 3,844 | | 43.4% |
| 1920 | 4,752 | | 23.6% |
| 1930 | 6,045 | | 27.2% |
| 1940 | 6,286 | | 4.0% |
| 1950 | 7,192 | | 14.4% |
| 1960 | 7,055 | | −1.9% |
| 1970 | 7,325 | | 3.8% |
| 1980 | 6,862 | | −6.3% |
| 1990 | 7,156 | | 4.3% |
| 2000 | 8,484 | | 18.6% |
| 2010 | 10,388 | | 22.4% |
| 2020 | 10,676 | | 2.8% |
| 2025 (est.) | 10,682 | ▲ | 0.1% |
U.S. Decennial Census

=== Racial and ethnic composition ===
Mount Airy city, North Carolina – Racial and ethnic composition Note: the US Census treats Hispanic/Latino as an ethnic category. This table excludes Latinos from the racial categories and assigns them to a separate category. Hispanics/Latinos may be of any race.
| Race / Ethnicity (NH = Non-Hispanic) | Pop 2000 | Pop 2010 | Pop 2020 | % 2000 | % 2010 | % 2020 |
|---|---|---|---|---|---|---|
| White alone (NH) | 6,981 | 8,484 | 8,125 | 82.28% | 81.67% | 76.11% |
| Black or African American alone (NH) | 662 | 846 | 806 | 7.80% | 8.14% | 7.55% |
| Native American or Alaska Native alone (NH) | 30 | 29 | 14 | 0.35% | 0.28% | 0.13% |
| Asian alone (NH) | 214 | 147 | 148 | 2.52% | 1.42% | 1.39% |
| Native Hawaiian or Pacific Islander alone (NH) | 3 | 3 | 3 | 0.04% | 0.03% | 0.03% |
| Other race alone (NH) | 6 | 2 | 28 | 0.07% | 0.02% | 0.26% |
| Mixed race or Multiracial (NH) | 90 | 178 | 319 | 1.06% | 1.71% | 2.99% |
| Hispanic or Latino (any race) | 498 | 699 | 1,233 | 5.87% | 6.73% | 11.55% |
| Total | 8,484 | 10,388 | 10,676 | 100.00% | 100.00% | 100.00% |

=== 2020 census ===
As of the 2020 census, there were 10,676 people, 4,865 households, and 2,530 families residing in the city. The median age was 47.9 years. 19.2% of residents were under the age of 18 and 26.9% of residents were 65 years of age or older. For every 100 females there were 85.6 males, and for every 100 females age 18 and over there were 81.6 males age 18 and over.

98.3% of residents lived in urban areas, while 1.7% lived in rural areas.

Of all households, 24.3% had children under the age of 18 living in them. 37.1% were married-couple households, 20.5% were households with a male householder and no spouse or partner present, and 37.7% were households with a female householder and no spouse or partner present. About 40.1% of all households were made up of individuals, and 20.7% had someone living alone who was 65 years of age or older.

There were 5,378 housing units, of which 9.5% were vacant. The homeowner vacancy rate was 2.2% and the rental vacancy rate was 6.1%.

=== 2010 census ===
As of the census of 2010, there were 10,388 people in 4,934 households. The people per square mile was 891.4. There were 5,296 housing units. The population percent change from 2000 to 2010 was 22.4% up. The racial makeup of the city was 84.1% White descent, 8.2% African American, 0.3% American Indian and Alaska Native, 1.4% Asian, 0.1% Native Hawaiian and Other Pacific Islander, 2.2% Persons reporting two or more races, 6.7% Hispanic or Latino. Persons per household was 2.10. Average household income was $35,428. Persons below poverty level was 21.1%. High school graduates were 76.9% and bachelor's degree or higher was 25.9%.

=== 2000 census ===
As of the census of 2000, there were 8,484 people, 3,667 households, and 2,130 families residing in the city. The population density was 1,010.8 inhabitants per square mile (390.3/km^{2}). There were 4,129 housing units at an average density of 491.9 per square mile (189.9/km^{2}). The racial makeup of the city was 85.34% White descent, 7.99% African American, 0.35% Native American, 2.55% Asian American, 0.05% Pacific Islander, 2.49% from other races, and 1.24% from two or more races. Hispanic or Latino of any race were 5.87% of the population.

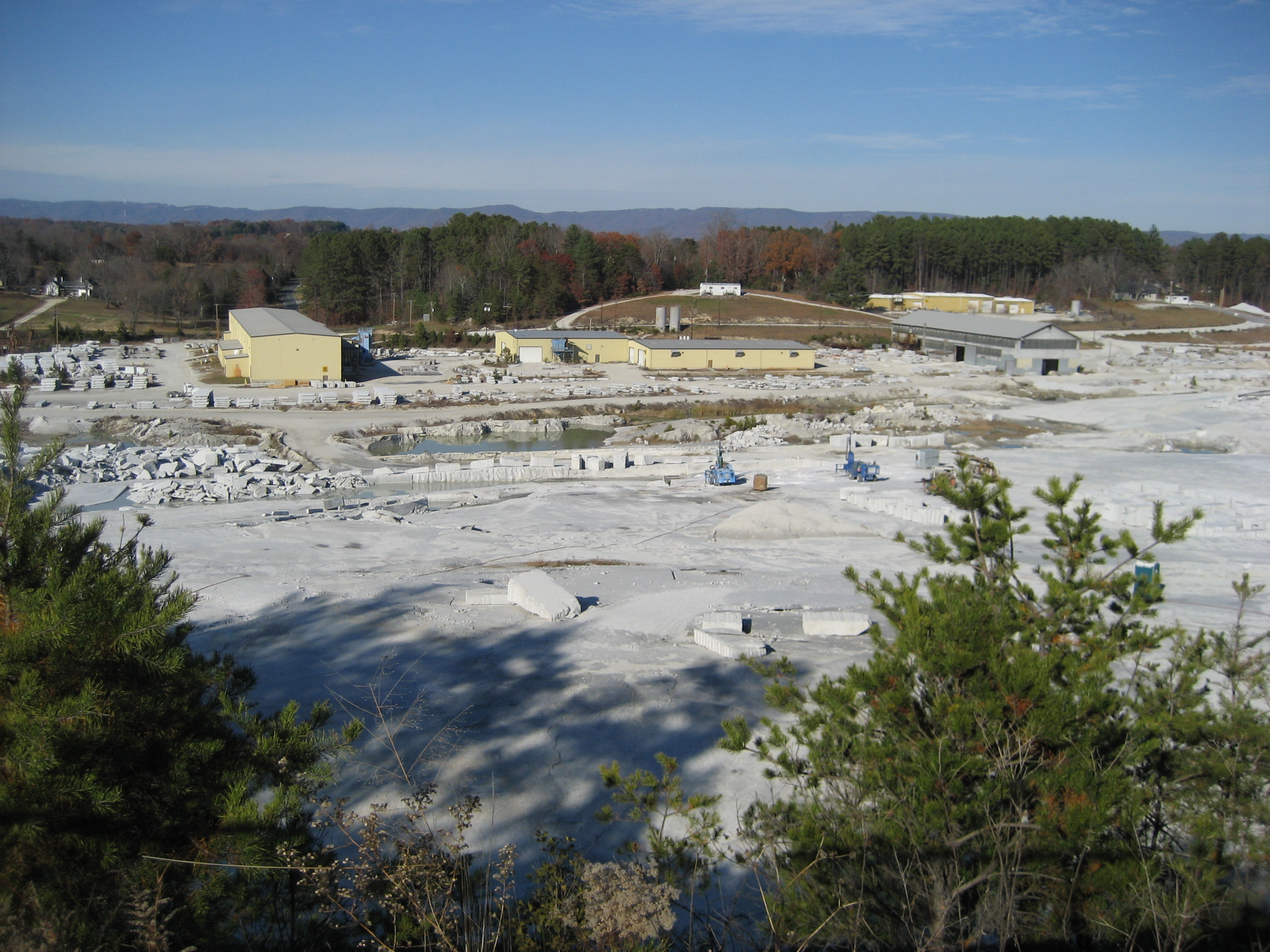
World's largest open faced granite quarry, near Mount Airy.

There were 3,667 households, out of which 24.3% had children under the age of 18 living with them, 40.6% were married couples living together, 14.0% had a female householder with no husband present, and 41.9% were non-families. 38.5% of all households were made up of individuals, and 19.6% had someone living alone who was 65 years of age or older. The average household size was 2.16 and the average family size was 2.87.

In the city, the population was spread out, with 21.6% under the age of 18, 6.5% from 18 to 24, 25.1% from 25 to 44, 21.3% from 45 to 64, and 25.6% who were 65 years of age or older. The median age was 43 years. For every 100 females, there were 84.5 males. For every 100 females age 18 and over, there were 78.4 males.

The median income for a household in the city was $26,910, and the median income for a family was $33,412. Males had a median income of $27,299 versus $24,830 for females. The per capita income for the city was $17,237. About 17.4% of families and 19.9% of the population were below the poverty line, including 24.7% of those under age 18 and 20.7% of those age 65 or over.

== Arts and culture ==
=== Mayberry ===
Actor Andy Griffith was born in Mount Airy, and the town is considered to have been the basis for Mayberry, the setting of the TV shows The Andy Griffith Show and Mayberry R.F.D. The community holds an annual "Mayberry Days" celebration during the last weekend of September; 30,000 attended in 2009, and 90,000 attended for the show's 50th anniversary in 2010. The University of North Carolina at Greensboro estimates the town receives $5 million each year as a result. Surviving members of the cast, along with family members of other cast members, often visit. The 2024 event was slated to have a special appearance by Karen Knotts, Don Knotts' daughter.

Several Ford Galaxie police cars, painted to resemble those used on the show, gave rides to guests. A barber shop has been named "Floyd's."

The Andy Griffith Museum, founded in 2009 by Emmett Forrest, attracts 200 visitors a day. The 2,500-square-feet museum, located half a mile from Griffith's childhood home, houses the world's largest collection of Andy Griffith memorabilia.

Mayberry Days will continue on September 23–29, 2024.

The Andy Griffith Home Place, the house where Griffith lived until he graduated from high school, is available to rent for overnight stays.

=== Autumn Leaves Festival ===
Held the second weekend in October, the Autumn Leaves Festival attracts over 200,000 people to the city during the festival weekend. Vendors sell food and other items, and there is a stage for musicians.

=== Bluegrass and old-time music ===
The home of old-time music legend Tommy Jarrell, bluegrass gospel legends The Easter Brothers, and country singer Donna Fargo, Mount Airy has a long history with regional music. Mount Airy's WPAQ is one of the few bluegrass and old-time music stations still operating and has been airing the live radio show Merry-Go-Round from the Downtown Cinema Theatre since 1948. Weekly bluegrass jam sessions at The Andy Griffith Playhouse and the annual Mount Airy Fiddlers Convention also serve to attract old-time musicians from across the region and the world. The Fiddlers Convention first began in 1972, and is held the first weekend in June at Veterans Memorial Park. The Blue Ridge Music Center with its amphitheater and music museum of old-time music is just a few miles away on the Blue Ridge Parkway at Milepost 213, near Galax, Virginia. This area is home to the Round Peak style of old-time music, which started in the Round Peak community, just west of Mount Airy.

== Education ==
Mount Airy has a city-funded school district consisting of four schools.

=== Mount Airy City Schools ===
- Mount Airy High School
- Mount Airy Middle School
- Jones Intermediate School
- BH Tharrington Elementary School

=== Surry County Schools ===
There are also other schools in Mount Airy that are controlled by the Surry County Schools district.

- North Surry High School
- Gentry Middle School
- Meadowview Magnet Middle School
- Cedar Ridge Elementary School
- Flat Rock Elementary School
- Franklin Elementary School
- White Plains Elementary School

=== Charter schools ===
Mount Airy has one k-12 public-funded charter school, Millennium Charter Academy.

=== Private schools ===
- White Plains Christian School

=== Libraries ===
The Mount Airy community is also served by a Public Library that won the American Institute of Architects Design Award.

== Notable people ==
- Frank Beamer (born 1946), retired head football coach at Virginia Tech, born in Mount Airy and raised in Fancy Gap, Virginia
- Ron Blackburn (1935–1998), MLB player
- Chang and Eng Bunker (1811–1874), famous "Siamese Twins" conjoined twins who settled in Mount Airy after they retired from show business
- Ben Callahan (1957–2007), MLB player
- Bill Cox (1929–2017), NFL defensive player
- Chubby Dean (1916–1970), MLB player
- Donna Fargo (born 1945), country music singer and songwriter, best known for the song "The Happiest Girl in the Whole USA"
- Benton Flippen (1920–2011), old-time fiddler, banjo player, and guitarist
- Emmett Forrest (1927–2013), founder of the Andy Griffith Museum
- Maddie Gardner, (born 1993), local news reporter and internationally recognized cheerleader
- Andy Griffith (1926–2012), American actor, singer, musician, and comedian
- Bill Hayes, television producer
- Caleb V. Haynes (1895–1966), United States Air Force major general
- Jerry Hemmings (born 1948), basketball coach
- Tommy Jarrell (1901–1985), old-time fiddler, banjo player, and singer
- Luke Lambert, NASCAR crew chief
- Betty Lynn (1926–2021), actress
- Mark Daniel Merritt (born 1961), American music composer
- Alex Sink (born 1948), former chief financial officer of Florida, Democratic nominee for governor of Florida in 2010
- Anna Wood (born 1985), actress
- Ethan Evans (born 2001), NFL punter for the Los Angeles Rams

== Sister city ==
Mount Airy has one sister city:

- Samut Songkhram, Thailand
