= William Alfred Moore House =

Historic house in North Carolina, United States

- U.S. National Register of Historic Places
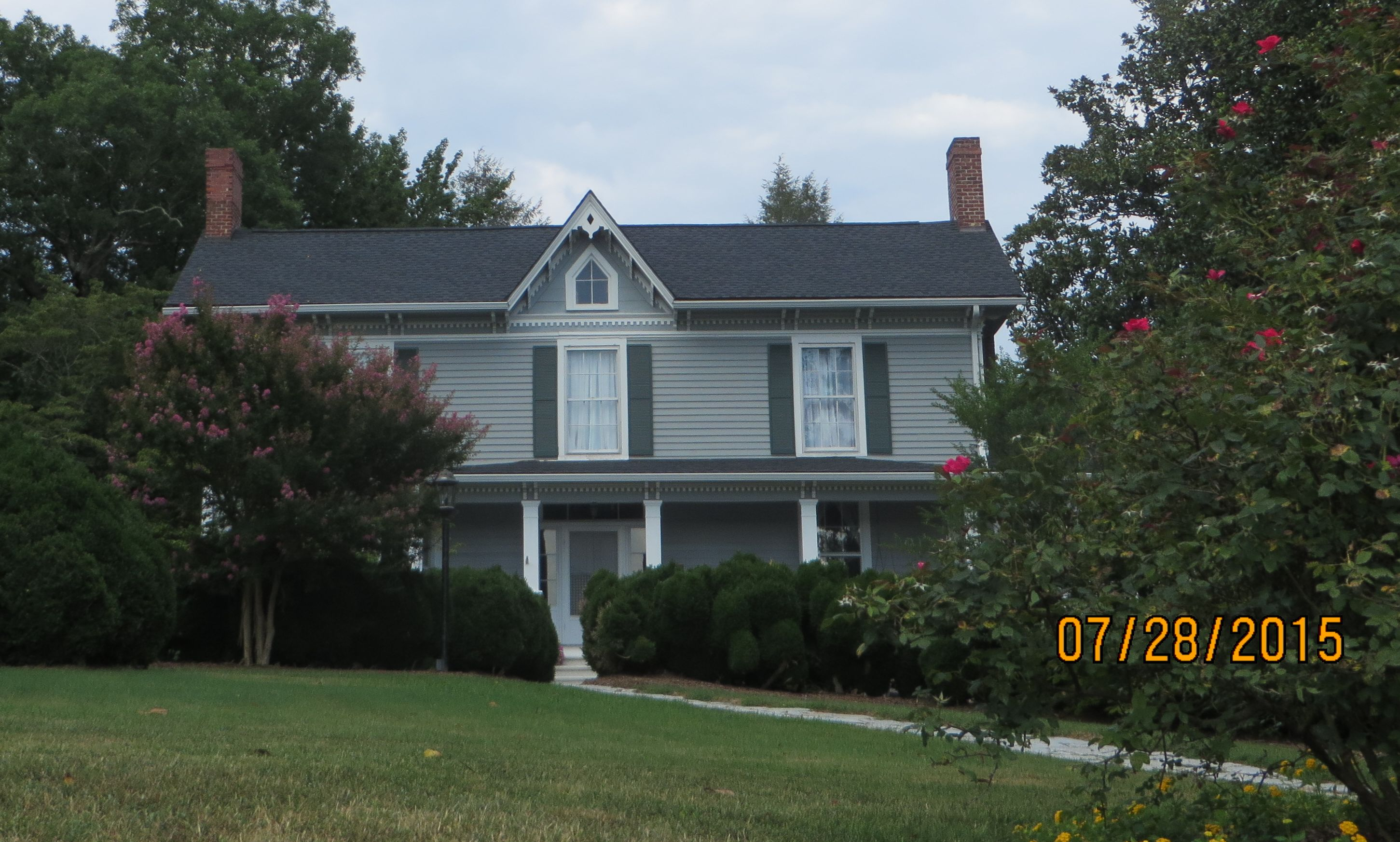

- Location within North Carolina Location within the United States
- Location: 301 Moore Ave. Mount Airy, North Carolina
- Coordinates: 36°30′6″N 80°36′21″W
- Area: 4.1 acres (1.7 ha)
- Built: 1861-1863
- Architectural style: Italianate, Greek Revival, Gothic Revival
- NRHP reference No.: 86000406
- Added to NRHP: March 5, 1986

The William Alfred Moore House is a historic home located at Mount Airy, Surry County, North Carolina. It was built between 1861 and 1863, and is the earliest known structure still standing in Mount Airy. The house is known for its Italianate and Gothic Revival exterior details and Greek Revival interior. In the front yard stands a rare hexagonal gazebo (c. 1865) made of wood poles and intervening laurel root walls. The Moore house is owned by the Mount Airy Restoration Foundation.

It was added to the National Register of Historic Places in 1986.
