= William Carter House =

Historic house in North Carolina, United States

- U.S. National Register of Historic Places
- Location within North Carolina Location within the United States
- Location: SR 1626, 0.35 miles (0.56 km) west of the junction with SR 1625, near Mount Airy, North Carolina
- Coordinates: 36°32′24″N 80°40′6″W
- Area: 9.8 acres (4.0 ha)
- Built: 1834
- Architectural style: Federal, Vernacular Federal
- NRHP reference No.: 90000349
- Added to NRHP: March 15, 1990

William Carter House, also known as the Carter-Burge-Miller House, is a historic home located near Mount Airy, Surry County, North Carolina. It was built about 1834, and is a two-story, three-bay, vernacular Federal-style brick dwelling. A one-story rear kitchen ell was added in 1931–1932. The interior features decorative painting from the Federal period.

It was listed on the National Register of Historic Places in 1990.
