= Marion House and Marion Brothers Store =

Historic buildings in North Carolina, United States

- U.S. National Register of Historic Places
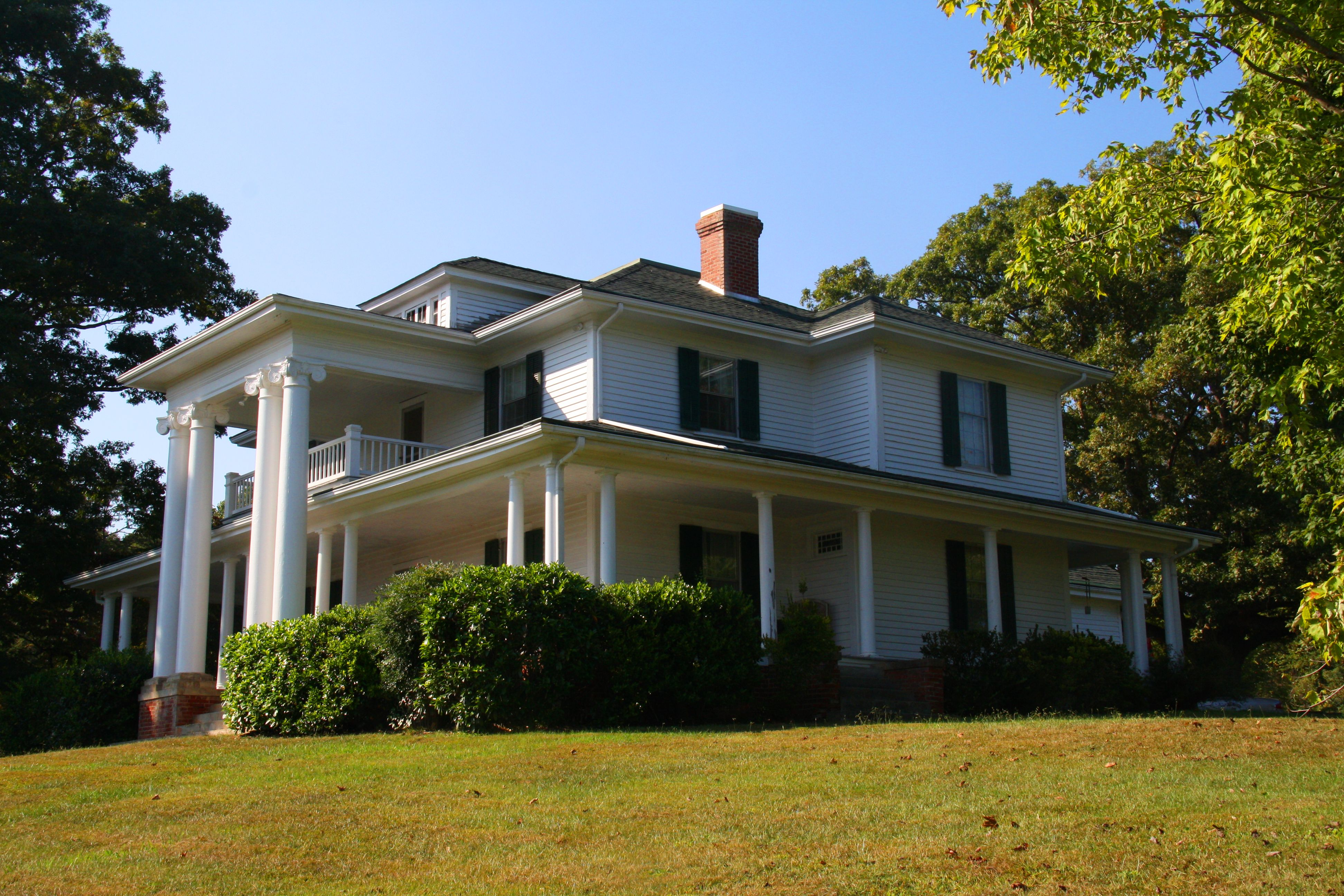
- Marion House

- Location within North Carolina Location within the United States
- Location: 7034 Siloam Rd., Siloam, North Carolina
- Coordinates: 36°17′10″N 80°33′52″W
- Area: 33 acres (13 ha)
- Built: 1861; 165 years ago, c. 1894, 1895, 1913
- Architect: Northup, Willard C
- Architectural style: Classical Revival, Southern Colonial
- NRHP reference No.: 12001090
- Added to NRHP: December 26, 2012

Marion House and Marion Brothers Store also known as Jubal E. Marion—Richard Nathaniel Marion House and Oakcrest, is a historic home and general store located at Siloam, Surry County, North Carolina. The house was built over three periods in 1861, 1895, and 1913. It is a two-story, three-bay, double pile, Classical Revival/Southern Colonial-style frame dwelling. The 1913 remodeling was by prominent Winston-Salem architect Willard C. Northup. It features a two-story, Ionic order central portico and a one-story porch with Tuscan order columns that nearly encircles the house. The Marion Brothers Store was built about 1894, and is a two-story, brick commercial building. The property also includes the contributing wash house/smokehouse, a garage with a tool room/shop and a pump room, a fish pool, a carbide house, two chicken houses, a barn, a corn crib / granary, and two tobacco barns.

It was listed on the National Register of Historic Places in 2012.

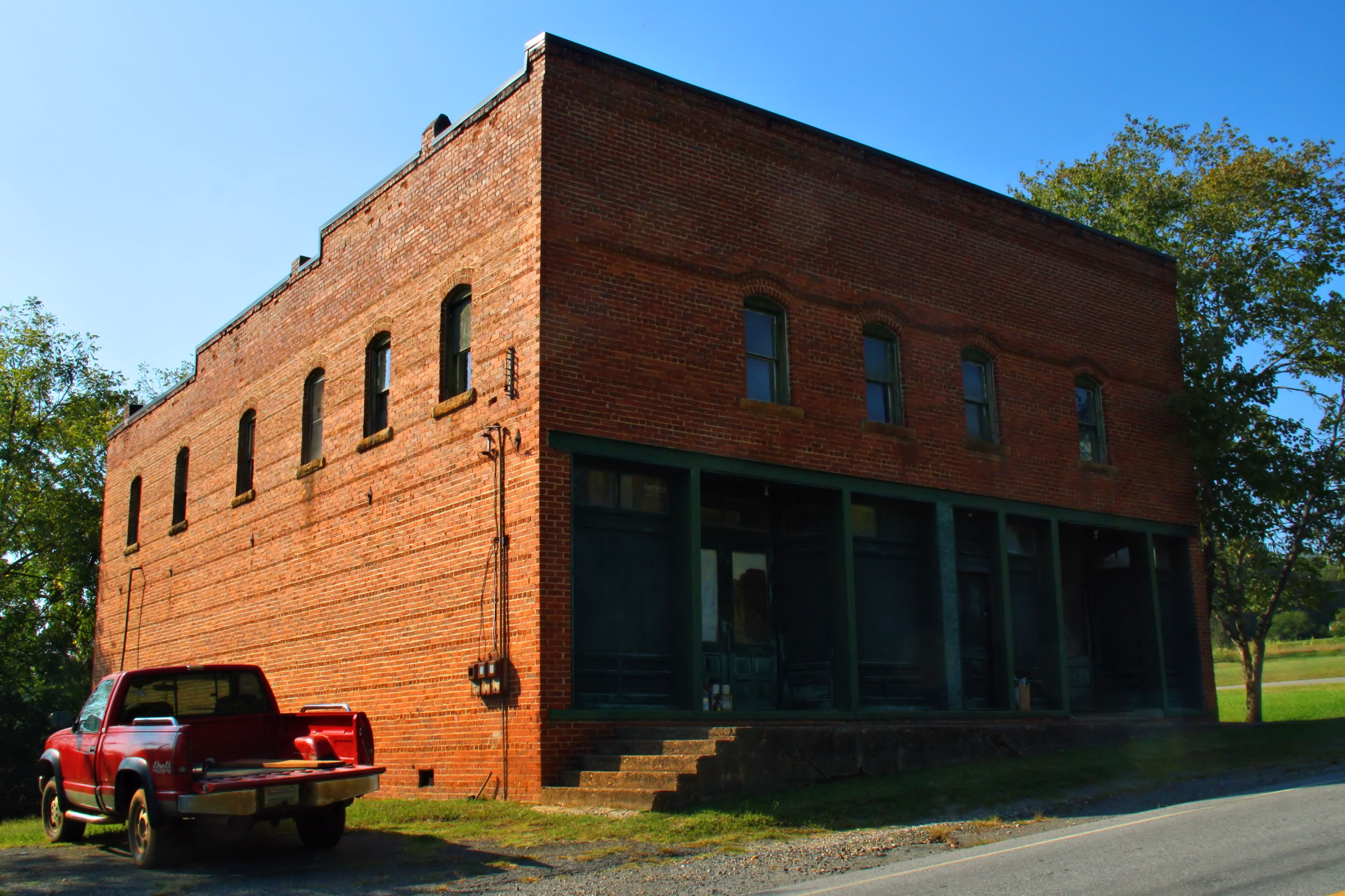
Marion Brothers Store
