= W. F. Carter House =

Historic house in North Carolina, United States

- U.S. National Register of Historic Places
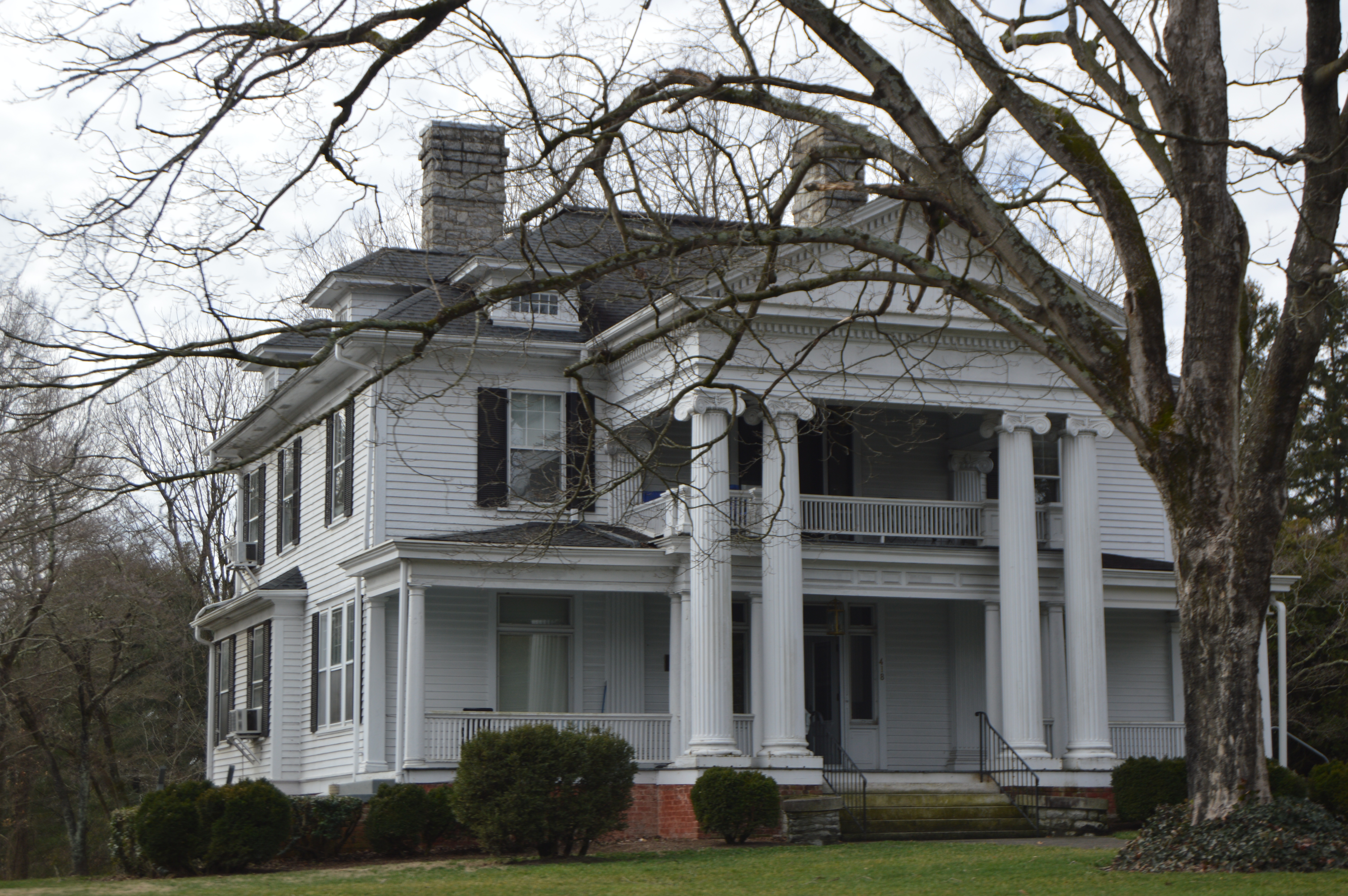
- Front and southeastern side

- Location within North Carolina Location within the United States
- Location: 418 S. Main St., Mount Airy, North Carolina
- Coordinates: 36°29′48″N 80°36′17″W
- Area: less than one acre
- Built: 1908
- Architectural style: Classical Revival
- NRHP reference No.: 83001917
- Added to NRHP: August 18, 1983

W. F. Carter House, also known as the Carter House, is a historic home located at Mount Airy, Surry County, North Carolina. It was built about 1908, and is a two-story, Classical Revival style frame dwelling. It features a central two-story Ionic order portico, with a one-story Doric order porch which runs beneath the portico for the full length of the three-bay facade. The house is an enlarged and remodeled earlier dwelling. Also on the property is a contributing outbuilding.

It was listed on the National Register of Historic Places in 1983.
