= North Carolina Granite Corporation Quarry Complex =

Historic district in North Carolina, United States

- U.S. National Register of Historic Places
- U.S. Historic district
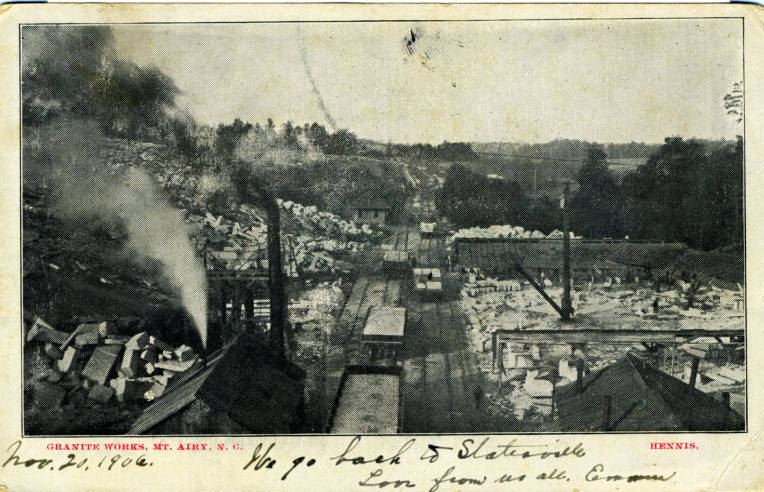
- Granite Works, Mt. Airy, N.C., 1906

- Location within North Carolina Location within the United States
- Nearest city: East of Mount Airy on NC 103, near Mount Airy, North Carolina
- Coordinates: 36°30′29″N 80°35′10″W
- Area: 266 acres (108 ha)
- Built: 1889
- NRHP reference No.: 80002900
- Added to NRHP: August 6, 1980

North Carolina Granite Corporation Quarry Complex is a historic granite quarry and national historic district located at Mount Airy, Surry County, North Carolina. The district encompasses 22 contributing buildings, 1 contributing site, and 8 contributing structures in an area approximately one mile long and 1/3 mile wide. Notable contributing resources include the cutting shed (1927), the office building (1928), and a building originally used as a blacksmith shop. It is the world's largest open faced granite quarry. Granite from the quarry was used to build the United States Bullion Depository at Fort Knox, the Arlington Memorial Bridge in Washington, the Wright Brothers National Memorial at Kitty Hawk, and the Albert Einstein Memorial in Washington. It was added to the National Register of Historic Places in 1980.
