= North Carolina Highway 49 =

State highway in North Carolina, US

North Carolina Highway 49

- Route of NC 49 highlighted in red

Route information
- Maintained by NCDOT
- Length: 177.8 mi (286.1 km)
- Existed: 1934–present
- Tourist routes: Uwharrie Scenic Road

Major junctions
- South end: SC 49 at the South Carolina state line in Lake Wylie, SC
- I-485 in Charlotte; I-77 / US 21 in Charlotte; I-485 near Harrisburg; I-73 / I-74 / US 220 in Asheboro; US 421 near Liberty; I-40 / I-85 in Burlington
- North end: SR 49 / SR 96 at the Virginia state line in Virgilina, VA

Location
- Country: United States
- State: North Carolina
- Counties: Mecklenburg, Cabarrus, Stanly, Rowan, Davidson, Randolph, Alamance, Orange, Caswell, Person, Granville

Highway system
- North Carolina Highway System; Interstate; US; State; Scenic
← NC 48	→ NC 50

North Carolina Highway 49 (NC 49) is a 177.8-mile (286.1 km) primary state highway in the U.S. state of North Carolina. It traverses much of the Piedmont region, connecting the cities of Charlotte, Asheboro, and Burlington.

== Route description ==
The highway is part of a three-state highway 49 system, entering North Carolina near Lake Wylie, south of Charlotte, and exiting the state near Virgilina, Virginia on the Virginia state line.

The route is an important corridor for traffic as it forms a part of the shortest route between the two largest cities in the Carolinas: Charlotte, and the North Carolina state capital of Raleigh. in Asheboro, NC 49 meets US 64, which forms the majority of the Charlotte-Raleigh link.

From where it enters the state, the highway passes through Charlotte (where it follows most of Tryon Street and the uptown portion of Graham Street) and after crossing the more suburban portions of western Cabarrus County, heads northeast into Stanly County. From uptown Charlotte to University City NC 49 is concurrent with US 29. After passing Mount Pleasant in eastern Cabarrus County, the road becomes a designated North Carolina Scenic Byway. The route passes close to Pfeiffer University in Stanly County before crossing the Yadkin River near the Tuckertown Reservoir. After crossing the river, the road skirts the northern foothills of the ancient Uwharrie Mountains and then drops down into the Asheboro area.

In western Asheboro, NC 49 joins US 64 for a 12-mile (19 km) stretch through Asheboro and the outskirts of Franklinville. In Ramseur, the two routes split; NC 49 goes north through the towns of Liberty and Alamance and into Burlington, where it meets I-40/I-85. A concurrency of NC 49 and US 70 winds through Burlington before the two routes diverge at Haw River, where NC 49 heads north. In northern Alamance County, NC 49 meets NC 62 at a 4-way at-grade junction. The two routes switch directions at this point; NC 49 turns east toward Roxboro. After passing through Roxboro and a short interval of concurrency with US 158 and US 501, NC 49 continues on toward the Virginia state line.

One unique fact about the route is that NC 49 is one of limited number of state highways that maintain their numbers in more than two contiguous states, in this case Virginia (SR 49) and South Carolina (SC 49), with an aggregate length in the three states of more than 325 miles (523 km).

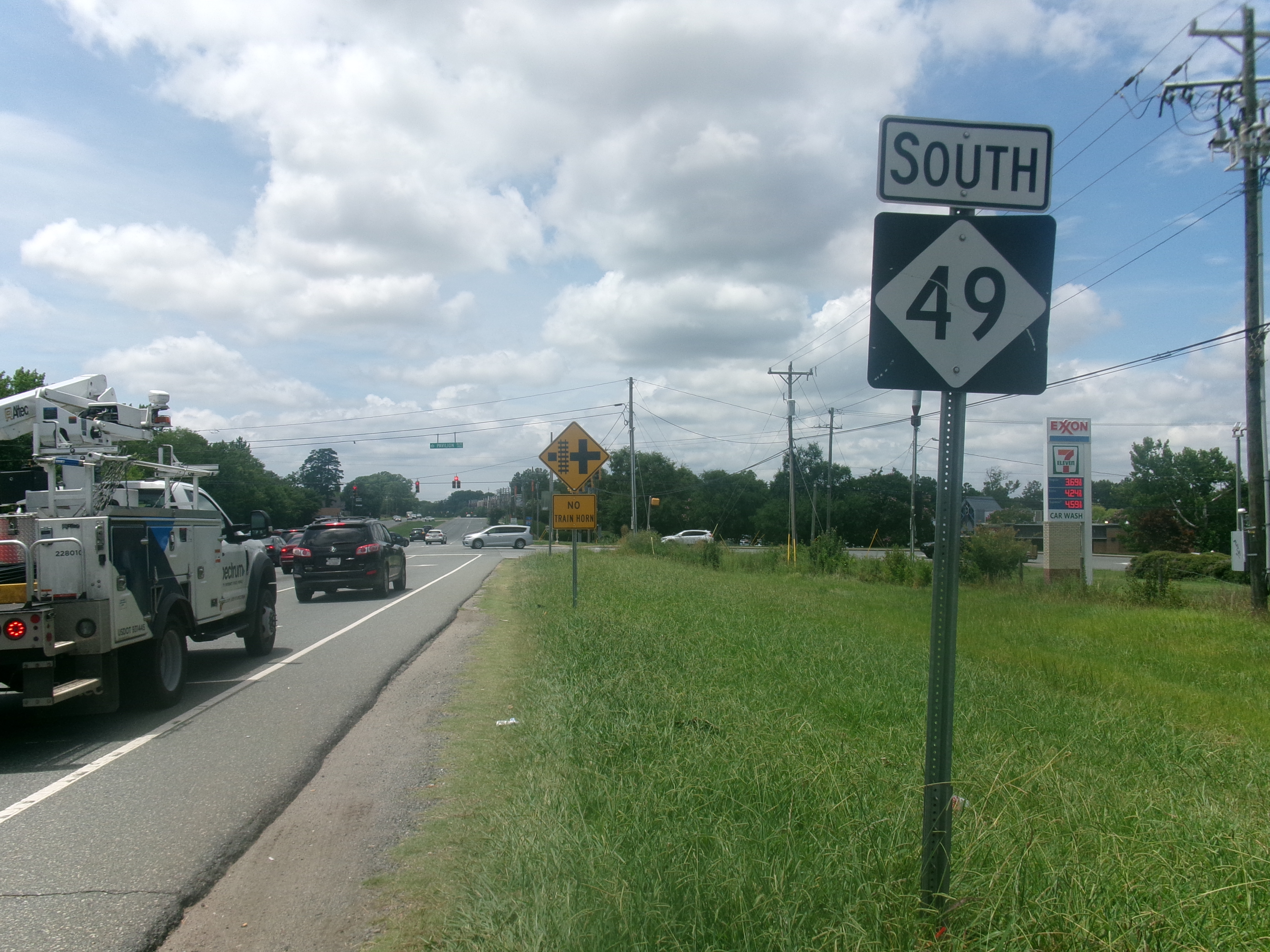
NC 49 southbound past the I-485 interchange in Charlotte

== History ==
Established in late 1934 as a renumbering of NC 15, it traversed from Lake Wylie to Morehead and Tryon Street, in Charlotte, where it connected with US 21/US 29/US 74/NC 27. In 1940, NC 49 was extended northeast from Charlotte to the Virginia state line, near Virgilina, Virginia; its routing went as follows: In Charlotte, it was overlapped with US 29 along Tryon Street and Old Concord Road. Traveling through Concord, via Old Charlotte Road, it then overlapped with NC 73 to Mount Pleasant. Replacing NC 62, it travels northeast, through Richfield and Farmer, to Asheboro. With a brief overlap with US 220 (Fayetteville Street), it continues its northeasterly along Old Liberty road, replacing NC 62, through Liberty, Graham, Haw River, to Pleasant Grove. Going east from Pleasant Grove, NC 49 replaced NC 144, through Roxboro, to the Virginia state line, near Virgilina.

In or by 1947, NC 49 was rerouted in Richfield, removing a concurrency with US 52. And in Asheboro, NC 49 was rerouted onto US 64 to Ramseur, then northeast to Liberty; its old alignment becoming NC 49A.

In 1949, NC 49 was rerouted in Roxboro from Main Street onto newly constructed Madison Boulevard. In 1953, NC 49 was given its modern routing bypassing Concord and a concurrency with NC 73; that same year, in the Charlotte area, it was moved from Old Concord Road to University City Boulevard. Around 1960, NC 49 was given a new alignment south of Farmer, in Randolph County. By 1962, in Roxboro, NC 49 was removed along Morgan Street and Concord Road to an overlap with US 158 on Leasburg Road.

In 1982, NC 49, in concurrency with US 29, was rerouted in Uptown Charlotte from Tryon Street onto Morehead and Graham Streets, cutting back onto Tryon Street via Dalton Avenue. By 1993, NC 49 was adjusted in Pleasant Grove to intersect with NC 62; before it would turn nearby without connecting. In 2004, NC 49/NC 57 was rerouted from a section of Leasburg Road onto Long Avenue, in Roxboro.

=== North Carolina Highway 15 ===
North Carolina Highway 15
- Location: SC state line–Salisbury
- Length: 60.3 mi (97.0 km)
- Existed: 1921–1934

North Carolina Highway 15 (NC 15) was an original state highway, established in 1921. It began at the intersection of Trade and Tryon Street in Charlotte, connecting with NC 20/NC 27, traversing northeast along Tryon Street and Old Concord Road to Harrisburg and Concord. From Concord, it went north through Kannapolis and Landis before ending in Salisbury at Main and Innes Street, connecting with NC 10/NC 80. In 1927, US 170 was assigned on all of NC 15. By 1930, NC 15 was extended south on Tryon Street/York Road to SC 163, at Lake Wylie. In 1932, US 170 was renumbered as an extension of US 29. In 1934, because of US 15 establishing in the state, NC 15 was removed on all sections overlapping with US 29 and the remaining section was renumbered to NC 49.

== Major intersections ==
County	Location	mi	km	Destinations	Notes
Catawba River / Lake Wylie		0.00	0.00	SC 49 south (Charlotte Highway) – York	Southern terminus
Catawba River / Lake Wylie		0.00	0.00	Buster Boyd Bridge; South Carolina–North Carolina state line	
Mecklenburg	Charlotte	3.5	5.6	NC 160 (Steele Creek Road)	
Mecklenburg	Charlotte	7.7	12.4	I-485 to I-77 – Columbia	Exit 1 (I-485)
Mecklenburg	Charlotte	11.5	18.5	I-77 / US 21 / Charlotte Route 4 / Billy Graham Parkway – Rock Hill, Charlotte	Exit 6B (I-77)
Mecklenburg	Charlotte	14.4	23.2	NC 160 south (West Boulevard)	Northern terminus of NC 160
Mecklenburg	Charlotte	15.1	24.3	Tryon Street (Morehead Street) to I-277 / US 74	Former south end of NC 27 overlap
Mecklenburg	Charlotte	15.3	24.6	I-277 north / US 74 east / NC 27 east to I-77 / I-85	Northbound I-277 entrance only
Mecklenburg	Charlotte	15.4	24.8	US 29 south / Mint Street (Morehead Street)	South end of US 29 overlap, and former north end of NC 27 overlap
Mecklenburg	Charlotte	16.6	26.7	I-277 / NC 16 to I-77 / US 21 / 10th Street / 12th Street	Exit 3B (I-277)
Mecklenburg	Charlotte	22.7	36.5	To I-85 south / Sandy Avenue – Gastonia	Exit 42 (I-85)
Mecklenburg	Charlotte	23.3	37.5	US 29 north (Tryon Street) to University Boulevard north / I-85 – Concord	North end of US 29 overlap
Mecklenburg	Charlotte	24.0	38.6	NC 24 (W.T. Harris Boulevard) to I-485 / Chancellor Park Drive – CPCC Cato Campus	Interchange
Mecklenburg	Charlotte	26.3	42.3	I-485 – Pineville, Concord	Exit 33 (I-485)
Cabarrus	Harrisburg	31.7	51.0	Pharr Mill Road	One Quadrant Interchange
Cabarrus	Concord	36.6	58.9	US 601 (Warren Coleman Boulevard) – Concord, Monroe	Interchange; south end of NC 73 Truck overlap
Cabarrus	Mount Pleasant	42.7	68.7	NC 73 – Albemarle, Concord	Interchange; north end of NC 73 Truck overlap
Stanly	Richfield	54.6	87.9	US 52 (Church Street) – Salisbury, Albemarle, Pfeiffer University	
Stanly		58.4	94.0	NC 8 south – New London	South end of NC 8 overlap
Rowan	No major junctions				
Yadkin River		59.9	96.4	Senator Stan Bigham Bridge	
Davidson	Newsom	62.3	100.3	NC 8 north / Badin Lake Road – Lexington	North end of NC 8 overlap
Davidson	Handy	66.3	106.7	NC 109 – Troy, Denton	Interchange
Randolph		70.9	114.1	NC 47 west / Bombay School Road – Denton	Eastern terminus of NC 47
Randolph		82.4	132.6	US 64 – Lexington, Raleigh	Exit 341 (US 64)
Randolph	Asheboro	83.4	134.2	Old N.C. Highway 49 – Farmer	Interchange; northbound entrance/southbound exit only
Randolph	Asheboro	84.0	135.2	US 64 Bus. west (Dixie Drive) / Albemarle Road – Lexington	Interchange; west end of US 64 Bus. overlap
Randolph	Asheboro	84.2	135.5	I-73 / I-74 / US 220 – Rockingham, Randleman, Greensboro	Exit 72A (I-73)
Randolph	Asheboro	85.2	137.1	US 220 Bus. (Fayetteville Street)	Interchange
Randolph	Asheboro	85.5	137.6	NC 159 south (Zoo Parkway) / Cox Road – North Carolina Zoo	Northern terminus of NC 159
Randolph	Asheboro	87.0	140.0	NC 42 – Coleridge, Bennett	
Randolph		89.1	143.4	US 64 west / US 64 Bus. end – Lexington	Exit 352 (US 64); trumpet interchange; east end of US 64 Bus. and west end of US 64 overlap
Randolph	Ramseur	94.8	152.6	NC 22 north (East Main Street) – Greensboro	north end of NC 22 overlap
Randolph	Ramseur	95.1	153.0	NC 22 south (Coleridge Road)	South end of NC 22 overlap
Randolph	Ramseur	95.6	153.9	US 64 east (Jordan Road) / Columbia Avenue – Siler City, Raleigh	East end of US 64 overlap
Randolph		102.9	165.6	US 421 – Siler City, Greensboro	Interchange
Alamance	Burlington	122.8	197.6	I-40 / I-85 – Durham, Greensboro	Exit 145 (I-85)
Alamance	Burlington	123.2	198.3	NC 54 west (Chapel Hill Road) / NC 100 west (Maple Avenue)	West end of NC 54 overlap; eastern terminus of NC 100
Alamance	Graham	124.3	200.0	NC 87 north (Elm Street)	North end of NC 87 overlap
Alamance	Graham	124.8	200.8	NC 87 south (Main Street)	South end of NC 87 overlap
Alamance	Graham	125.2	201.5	NC 54 east (Harden Street) to Elm Street / I-85	East end of NC 54 overlap
Alamance	Haw River	127.9	205.8	US 70 (Main Street) – Burlington	
Alamance	Pleasant Grove	134.8	216.9	To NC 62 – Yanceyville, Burlington	
Alamance		137.5	221.3	NC 119 – Semora, Mebane	
Orange		144.0	231.7	NC 86 south – Hillsborough	South end of NC 86 overlap
Caswell	Prospect Hill	144.4	232.4	NC 86 north – Yanceyville	North end of NC 86 overlap
Person	Roxboro	159.5	256.7	US 158 west (Leasburg Road) / Morgan Street – Yanceyville	West end of US 158 overlap
Person	Roxboro	160.0	257.5	NC 57 north (Semora Road)	North end of NC 57 overlap
Person	Roxboro	160.3	258.0	US 158 east / US 501 south / NC 57 south (Durham Pike) – Durham, Oxford	East end of US 158 and south end of US 501/NC 57 overlap
Person	Roxboro	161.9	260.6	US 501 north (Main Street) – South Boston, VA	North end of US 501 overlap
Granville		177.3	285.3	NC 96 south – Oxford	South end of NC 96 overlap
Granville		177.4	285.5	SR 49 north / SR 96 west (Florence Avenue) – Virgilina	Northern terminus; Virginia state line; north end of NC 96 overlap
1.000 mi = 1.609 km; 1.000 km = 0.621 mi: Concurrency terminus; Incomplete access

== Special routes ==
=== New London alternate route ===
North Carolina Highway 49A
- Location: New London, North Carolina
- Length: 3.8 mi (6.1 km)
- Existed: 1940–1948

North Carolina Highway 49A (NC 49A) was established as a renumbering of NC 62A. A spur route of NC 49, it went south near the Tuckertown Reservoir to New London, connecting with US 52/NC 740 on Gold Street. In 1948, it was renumbered to NC 6; it later became part of NC 8 in 1953.

=== Asheboro–Liberty alternate route ===
North Carolina Highway 49A
- Location: Asheboro–Liberty, North Carolina
- Length: 22.0 mi (35.4 km)
- Existed: 1947–1967

North Carolina Highway 49A (NC 49A) was established after mainline NC 49 was rerouted onto US 64 from Asheboro to Ramseur, then northeast to Liberty; NC 49A continued the old alignment through Asheboro via Albemarle Avenue, Park Street, Salisbury Street, and Fayetteville Street. North of Asheboro it followed Old Liberty Road to Liberty. In November 1967, NC 49A was decommissioned, most of which (except for Fayetteville Street) becoming secondary roads.
