= Interstate 285 (North Carolina) =

Highway in North Carolina

Interstate 285
- I-285 highlighted in red; Future I-285 highlighted in blue

Route information
- Auxiliary route of I-85
- Maintained by NCDOT
- Length: 23.49 mi (37.80 km)
- Existed: 2018–present
- NHS: Entire route

Major junctions
- South end: I-85 / US 29 / US 52 / US 70 in Lexington
- US 29 / US 70 in Lexington; US 64 near Lexington
- North end: I-40 / US 52 / NC 8 in Winston-Salem

Location
- Country: United States
- State: North Carolina
- Counties: Davidson, Forsyth

Highway system
- Interstate Highway System; Main; Auxiliary; Suffixed; Business; Future; North Carolina Highway System; Interstate; US; State; Scenic
← NC 281	→ NC 294

Interstate 285 (I-285) is a 23.49 mile long auxiliary interstate highway connecting the cities of Lexington and Winston-Salem, in the U.S. state of North Carolina. The route was approved in February 2018 and was first signed in November 2018. An auxiliary route of I-85, it branches off of its parent route and runs northeast, bypassing central Lexington, before turning due north and heading toward Winston-Salem, terminating at an interchange with I-40. I-285 is cosigned with US Highway 52 (US 52) for its entire route, and as of November 2018, still uses US 52 milemarkers and exit numbers. Other routes cosigned along parts of the route include I-85 Business (I-85 Bus), US 29, US 70, and North Carolina Highway 8 (NC 8). I-285 has been approved for an extension along the US 52 freeway through Winston-Salem to meet the future Winston-Salem Northern Beltway.

== Route description ==
The southern terminus of I-285 is at the southwestern corner of the city of Lexington, at a partial interchange with I-85, with northbound-to-northbound and southbound-to-southbound the only possible movement; other directions require the use of surface streets in Lexington, using exit 84 (NC 47), the first exit on I-285. From the southern terminus, the route is also cosigned with US 52, US 29, US 70, and I-85 Bus. The route follows the western boundary of Lexington's corporate limits, acting as a bypass of the city. Exit 85 is for Green Needles Road, while exit 86 provides access to Salisbury Road and Main Street, an old alignment of US 29/US 70. Exit 87 is a partial interchange and marks the northern end of the concurrency with I-85 Bus/US 29/US 70, which branch off to the northeast here. Exit 89 (US 64/Center Street) provides access for drivers heading from southbound I-85 Bus and northbound I-285, and vice-versa, as those movements are not covered at the direct interchange at exit 87. North of US 64, the route passes the communities of Bethesda and Welcome. At exit 89, NC 8 joins the freeway and the road turns from northeast to due north. The next interchange is exit 97 (Old US 52) which provides access to both Welcome and the community of Midway. After exit 100 (Hickory Tree Road), I-285 enters the city of Winston-Salem. Exit 103 is for South Main Street, and exit 105 is for Clemmonsville Road. The I-285 designation ends at exit 107 (I-40), though the freeway continues on as US 52/NC 8.

== History ==
Approved by the American Association of State Highway and Transportation Officials (AASHTO) in September 2005, after receiving an earlier approval from the Federal Highway Administration (FHWA) in July 2005, intending to provide an Interstate-quality freeway to connect Winston-Salem to Charlotte (via a portion of I-85). The North Carolina Department of Transportation (NCDOT) installed "Future Interstate 285 Corridor" signs along the route in February 2006. The initial $2.5-million (equivalent to $3.43 million in 2024) project to improve the roadway to Interstate standards was approved in October 2011. With property acquisition already started in December 2012, cost estimates rose to $8.57 million (equivalent to $11.8 million in 2024). The contract was awarded to J.T. Russell and Sons Inc. of Albemarle for $7.6 million (equivalent to $10.4 million in 2024). Construction began in March 2014 and included reconstructing shoulders, improving drainage systems, resurfacing travel lanes, and realigning Marco Boulevard to accommodate a new southbound exit ramp alignment at Green Needles Road. In addition, crews resurfaced and preserved the bridges over Swearing Creek. The project was completed in late 2017.

On February 15, 2018, based on the completed improvements, the FHWA approved the I-285 signing between I-85 and I-40. In November 2018, NCDOT placed I-285 ground-mounted route shields along the route from I-85 to I-40.

== Future ==
On May 20, 2019, AASHTO approved a request by NCDOT to establish Future I-285 north from its current northern terminus to a future I-74/I-274 Winston-Salem Northern Beltway interchange. The justification for the 11.3-mile (18.2 km) extension was that Winston-Salem was a major transfer point for motor freight services and that numerous freight operators were already utilizing US 52 to access other major highways in and around the city; and that it would also serve the 330-acre (130 ha) Innovation Quarter, which will house research, business, and several college education facilities. The transition from future designation is dependent upon completion of the I-74/I-274 interchange and upgrades to interstate standards along the route. Other plans include possible widening to six total lanes (three in each direction).

== Exit list ==
Current exit numbers are based on US 52 mileage.

County	Location	mi	km	Exit	Destinations	Notes
Davidson	Lexington	0.00	0.00		I-85 south / US 29 south / US 52 south / US 70 west	Continuation beyond southern terminus; south end of US 29/US 52/US 70 overlap; former southern terminus of I-85 BL; I-85 exit 87
Davidson	Lexington	0.6	0.97	84	NC 47 to I-85 north	
Davidson	Lexington	1.5	2.4	85	Green Needles Road	
Davidson	Lexington	2.8	4.5	86	Lexington, Downtown	
Davidson	Lexington	3.7	6.0	87	US 29 north / US 70 east – High Point	North end of US 29/US 70 overlap; northbound exit and southbound entrance; former I-85 BL north
Davidson	Lexington	5.3	8.5	89	US 64 – Lexington, Mocksville	
Davidson	Bethesda	8.8	14.2	92	NC 8 south (Old U.S. Highway 52) – Welcome, Lexington	South end of NC 8 overlap
Davidson		14.0	22.5	97	Welcome Midway	Northbound signage Southbound signage
Davidson	Midway	16.2	26.1	100	Hickory Tree Road	
Forsyth	Winston-Salem	19.4	31.2	103	S. Main Street	
Forsyth	Winston-Salem	21.7	34.9	105	Clemmonsville Road	
Forsyth	Winston-Salem	22.8	36.7	107	I-40 to NC 109 south – Statesville, Greensboro	Current northern terminus; I-40 exits 193A-B
Forsyth	Winston-Salem	22.8	36.7		US 52 north / NC 8 north	Continuation beyond northern terminus
1.000 mi = 1.609 km; 1.000 km = 0.621 mi: Concurrency terminus
