= North Carolina Highway 8 =

State highway in North Carolina, US

North Carolina Highway 8
- NC 8 highlighted in red

Route information
- Maintained by NCDOT
- Length: 94.2 mi (151.6 km)
- Existed: 1930–present

Major junctions
- South end: US 52 in New London
- I-85 in Lexington; I-85 BL / US 29 / US 64 / US 70 in Lexington; I-285 / US 52 in Welcome; I-40 in Winston-Salem; I-74 in Winston-Salem; US 158 / US 421 / NC 150 in Winston-Salem; US 311 in Winston-Salem
- North end: SR 8 at the Virginia state line near Campbell

Location
- Country: United States
- State: North Carolina
- Counties: Stanly, Rowan, Davidson, Forsyth, Stokes

Highway system
- North Carolina Highway System; Interstate; US; State; Scenic
← NC 7	→ NC 9

North Carolina Highway 8 (NC 8) is a primary state highway in the U.S. state of North Carolina. The route connects the cities of Lexington and Winston-Salem to various recreational and natural sites including Uwharrie National Forest, High Rock Lake and Hanging Rock State Park.

== Route description ==
NC 8 begins with NC 740 at the intersection with US 52 and Gold Street, in New London. After a short, approximately 1,000 feet (300 m) concurrency with NC 740, it goes northeast to connect with NC 49, then travels briefly on divided four-lane through Rowan County and over the Yadkin River. After briefly serving as the northern perimeter for the Uwharrie National Forest, it splits with NC 49 and goes north to Southmont. Continuing north, it enters the Lexington city limits near I-85. Turning on Talbert Boulevard, it bypasses south of downtown Lexington, then continues north along Raleigh Road and the one-way streets of Fifth and Sixth streets. On the north side of Lexington, it connects with I-85 Business/US 29/US 64/US 70 before pressing on along Winston Road to Welcome, where it begins its longest concurrency with US 52.

With US 52, it bypasses east of Welcome and west of Midway before entering Winston-Salem, where the freeway becomes known as the North-South Expressway. With a brief concurrency with US 311, it eventually splits from US 52 at Germanton Road, where it continues along north as a two-lane rural highway. After joining with NC 65, it crosses into Stokes County and enters Germanton. 1-mile (1.6 km) later, it splits north from NC 65 to meet-up with NC 89 and traverse through Danbury. Ending its last concurrency just north of Hanging Rock State Park, it continues north crossing NC 704 before ending at the Virginia state line. Continuing into Virginia, it becomes State Route 8, towards Stuart, Virginia.

== History ==
NC 8 was established in 1930 as a new primary routing from Lexington, 5 miles (8.0 km) south to the Junior Order United American Mechanics (JOUAM) children's home, located near High Rock Lake. In 1936, it was extended further south to Abbot Creek, passing through Southmont. In 1939, NC 8 was extended southeast on new primary routing, crossing Abbot Creek, to NC 62.

In late 1940, NC 8 was extended north, in concurrency with US 52 to Winston-Salem, then replaced NC 109 in Forsyth and Stokes Counties to the Virginia state line, where it continued on as already existing SR 8. Between 1945 and 1949, NC 8 was rerouted north of Winston-Salem, from Indiana Avenue, Cherry Street and part of Germanton Road, and onto Patterson Avenue.

In 1953, NC 8 was extended southwest, with a short concurrency with NC 49 and replacing NC 6, to New London. In 1954, NC 8 was placed on one-way streets in downtown Winston-Salem, using 4th Street (southbound) and 5th Street (northbound). In 1960, NC 8 was moved from Main Street to Old Salem Road, in the Salem College area. In 1962, NC 8 was adjusted downtown Winston-Salem: northbound using Main Street–Fifth Street–Liberty Street, and southbound using Liberty Street–First Street. In 1967, NC 8 northbound was rerouted on a short concurrency with US 158/US 421 then north along a completed section of the North-South Freeway; NC 8 southbound remained unchanged until 1973, when the rest of the North-South Expressway was completed, eliminating its routing through downtown Winston-Salem. In 1972, NC 8 was adjusted from Third Street to Sixth Street in Lexington. In 1981, NC 8 was extended to Gold Street, then share short concurrency with NC 740 to its current southern terminus with US 52. In 1982, US 52/NC 8 was placed on new freeway west of Midway. Between 1991 and 1993, US 52/NC 8 was placed on new freeway bypassing east of Welcome. In 2002, NC 8 was rerouted in Lexington, from Main Street to continue along Raleigh Road to Talbert Boulevard then back to Cotton Grove Road.

== Major intersections ==
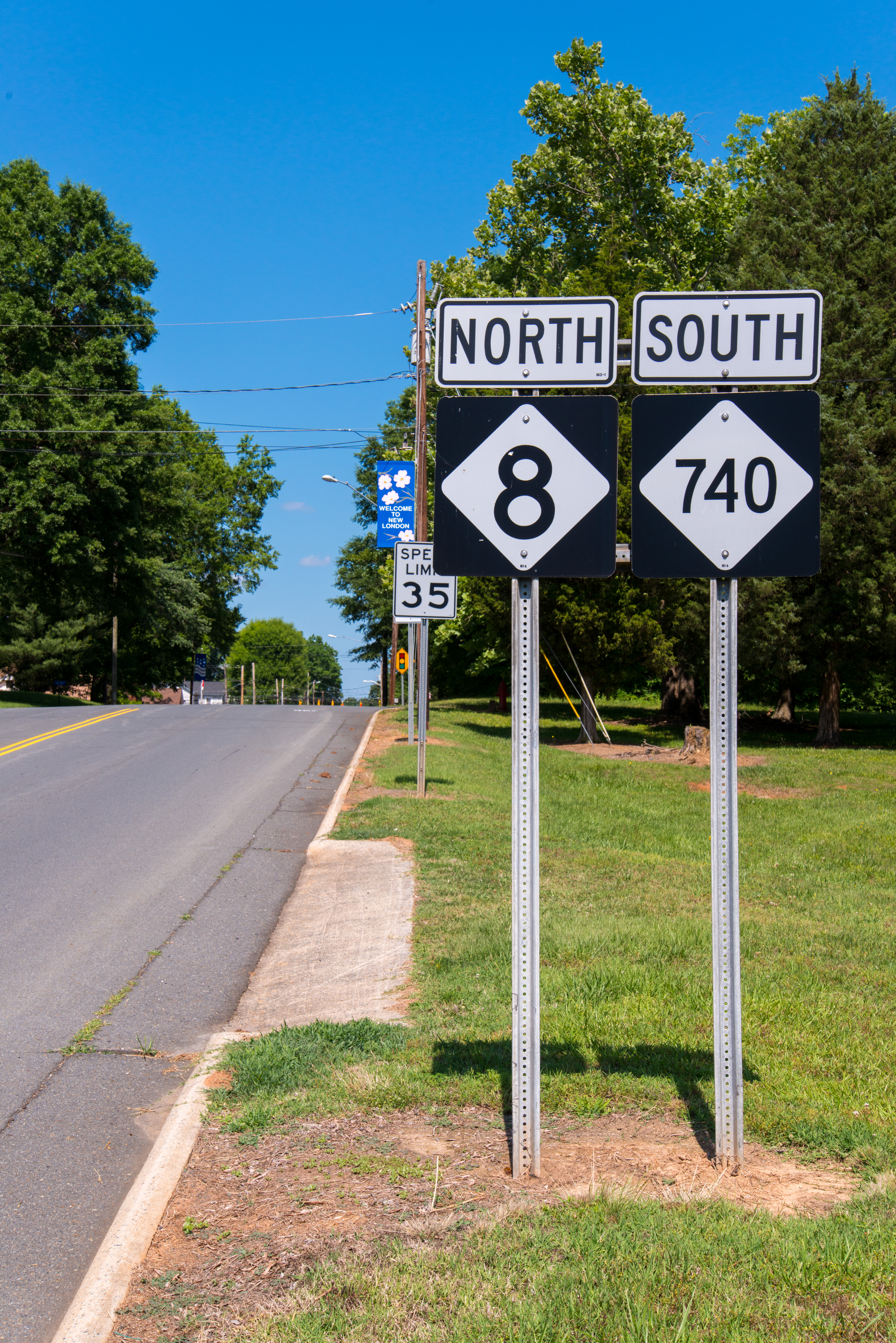
NC 8/NC 740, in New London

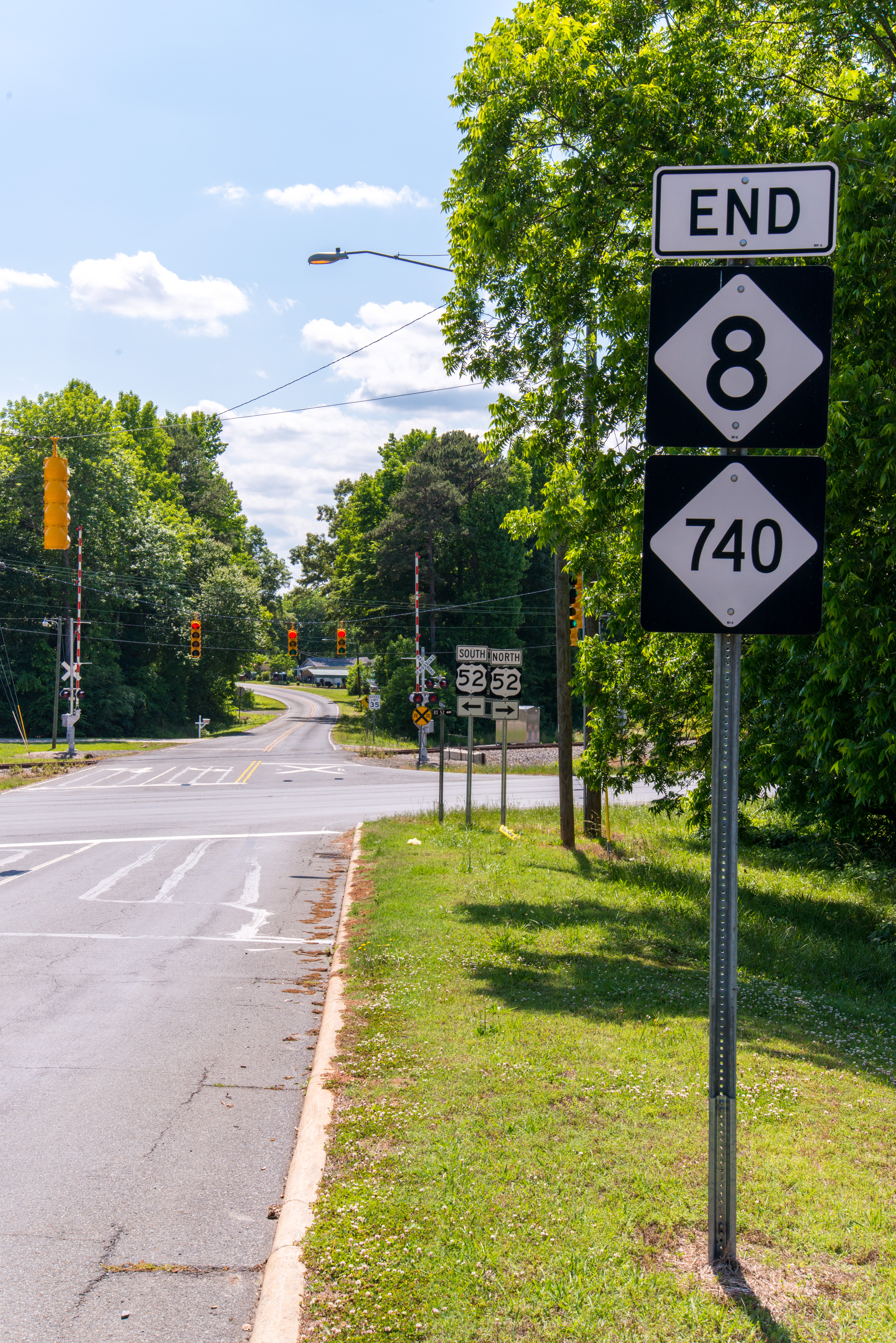
End of NC 8/NC 740 at US 52

County	Location	mi	km	Exit	Destinations	Notes
Stanly	New London	0.0	0.0		US 52 / NC 740 north – Albemarle, Salisbury	Southern terminus; North end of NC 740 overlap
Stanly	New London	0.2	0.32		NC 740 south – Badin	South end of NC 740 overlap; to Morrow Mountain State Park
Stanly		4.0	6.4		NC 49 south – Concord	South end of NC 49 overlap
Rowan	No major junctions					
Yadkin River		5.4	8.7	Senator Stan Bigham Bridge		
Davidson		7.8	12.6		NC 49 north – Asheboro	North end of NC 49 overlap
Davidson		30.3	48.8		NC 47 (Junior Order Home Road) – Denton, Linwood	
Davidson	Lexington	31.7	51.0		I-85 – Greensboro, Charlotte	Partial cloverleaf interchange; exit 91
Davidson	Lexington	37.0	59.5		US 29 / US 64 / US 70 – High Point, Asheboro, Mocksville, Salisbury	
Davidson	Welcome	39.7	63.9	92	I-285 south / US 52 south – Salisbury	South end of I-285/US 52 overlap
Davidson	Welcome	45.0	72.4	97	Old U.S. Hwy 52 – Midway	
Davidson	Midway	47.2	76.0	100	Hickory Tree Road	
Forsyth	Winston-Salem	50.3	81.0	103	South Main Street	
Forsyth	Winston-Salem	52.7	84.8	105	Clemmonsville Road	
Forsyth	Winston-Salem	53.8	86.6	107; A-B	A: I-40 east / I-285 end – Greensboro, High Point B: I-40 west – Statesville	North end of I-285 overlap Signed as exits 107A (east) and 107B (west)
Forsyth	Winston-Salem	54.5	87.7	108A	Sprague Street/Waughtown Street	To University of North Carolina School of the Arts
Forsyth	Winston-Salem			108B	Research Parkway	DDI
Forsyth	Winston-Salem	55.3	89.0	108B	Vargrave Street	Permanently closed as of January 6, 2014
Forsyth	Winston-Salem	55.8	89.8	108C	Stadium Drive – Old Salem	To Winston-Salem State University
Forsyth	Winston-Salem	56.1	90.3	109; A-B	A: US 158 east / US 421 east / NC 150 south – Kernersville B: US 158 west / US 421 west / NC 150 north – Downtown	Signed as exits 109A (east) and 109B (west)
Forsyth	Winston-Salem	56.5	90.9	110A	3rd 4th 5th Streets – Downtown	Permanently closed as of February 18, 2013
Forsyth	Winston-Salem	56.9	91.6	110B	US 311 north (ML King Jr Drive)	
Forsyth	Winston-Salem	57.1	91.9	110C	Liberty Street	
Forsyth	Winston-Salem	57.4	92.4	110D	Northwest Boulevard	Southbound exit only
Forsyth	Winston-Salem	58.2	93.7	111A	25th Street/28th Street	
Forsyth	Winston-Salem	58.4	94.0	111B	Liberty Street – Smith Reynolds Airport	Was northbound exit only; permanently closed
Forsyth	Winston-Salem	59.4	95.6	112	Akron Drive – Smith Reynolds Airport	To Coliseum and BB&T Field
Forsyth	Winston-Salem	60.2	96.9	113	Patterson Avenue	
Forsyth	Winston-Salem	61.8	99.5	114	US 52 north – Mount Airy	North end of US 52 overlap
Forsyth	Winston-Salem	63.9	102.8		NC 66 (Old Hollow Road) – Walkertown, Rural Hall	
Forsyth		64.2– 64.4	103.3– 103.6		I-74 – Wytheville, High Point	Double roundabout interchange; exit 43, opened to traffic on November 7, 2022
Forsyth		68.6	110.4		NC 65 west (Rural Hall-Germanton Road) – Rural Hall	West end of NC 65 overlap
Stokes	Germanton	69.6	112.0		NC 65 east – Walnut Cove	East end of NC 65 overlap
Stokes	Meadows	79.2	127.5		NC 89 east – Walnut Cove	East end of NC 89 overlap
Stokes	Meadows	85.9	138.2		NC 89 west – Mount Airy	West end of NC 89 overlap
Stokes	Coleville	94.3	151.8		NC 704 (Wesley D. Webster Highway) – Sandy Ridge, Westfield	
Stokes	Campbell	94.6	152.2		SR 8 north – Stuart	Northern terminus; Virginia state line
1.000 mi = 1.609 km; 1.000 km = 0.621 mi: Closed/former; Concurrency terminus; Incomplete access

== See also ==
- North Carolina Bicycle Route 4 - Concurrent with NC 8 between Sheppard Mill Road and Hanging Rock Park Road
