= U.S. Route 52 in North Carolina =

Section of U.S. Highway in North Carolina, United States

U.S. Highway 52
- US 52 highlighted in red

Route information
- Maintained by NCDOT
- Length: 150.3 mi (241.9 km)
- Existed: 1934–present

Major junctions
- South end: US 52 at the South Carolina state line at McFarlan
- US 74 in Wadesboro; I-85 in Salisbury; I-285 / US 29 / US 70 in Lexington; US 64 in Lexington; I-40 / I-285 in Winston-Salem; US 158 / US 421 / NC 150 in Winston-Salem; US 311 in Winston-Salem; I-74 in Rural Hall; I-74 near Mount Airy; US 601 in Mount Airy
- North end: US 52 at the Virginia state line near Mount Airy

Location
- Country: United States
- State: North Carolina
- Counties: Anson, Stanly, Cabarrus, Rowan, Davidson, Forsyth, Stokes, Surry

Highway system
- United States Numbered Highway System; List; Special; Divided; North Carolina Highway System; Interstate; US; State; Scenic
← NC 51	→ NC 53

U.S. Route 52 (US 52) is a north–south United States highway that runs for 150 miles (240 km) from the South Carolina state line, near McFarlan, to the Virginia state line, near Mount Airy. It serves as a strategic highway through the central North Carolina Piedmont. Because of its alignment in the state, US 52 does not follow the standard convention of an even U.S. route number going east–west.

Between the South Carolina border and Salisbury, the route is an at-grade road, varying in width from two to four lanes. It connects the town centers of a number of small towns in Anson, Stanly, Cabarrus, and Rowan Counties.

Between Salisbury in Rowan County and Mount Airy in Surry County, US 52 is a limited access freeway and is in the process of being upgraded to Interstate Highway standards. Several Interstate highways either already, or are planned to in the near future, overlay the US 52 freeway. From Salisbury to Lexington, it is cosigned with I-85. From Lexington to I-40 south of Winston-Salem it is cosigned with I-285. In the future, as the freeway is upgraded, the I-285 designation will be extended north through Winston-Salem to meet the interchange with the Winston-Salem Northern Beltway. North of that point, I-74 will leave the beltway to join US 52 and the two will remain cosigned until reaching the current short segment of I-74 located south of Mount Airy.

North of the I-74 junction in Surry County, the freeway continues on for a short distance, before becoming a four-lane divided boulevard known as the Andy Griffith Parkway to bypass the town center of Mt. Airy. Immediately before crossing into Virginia, the route reduces back down to two lanes.

== Route description ==
US 52 southbound/US 74 eastbound past NC 109/NC 742 in Wadesboro

US 52 enters North Carolina at Mount Airy. A bypass around Mount Airy, which carries US 52, is designated as the Andy Griffith Parkway. It goes by Pilot Mountain one of the most distinctive natural features in North Carolina. Through the Piedmont Triad region, US 52 is mostly a limited access freeway. It goes through Central Winston-Salem, and meets with Salem Parkway, which gives access to Downtown Winston-Salem and access to Interstate 40. The freeway soon comes to Interstate 40, before continuing into southern areas of the city. The route joins US 29/70 into Lexington and is concurrent I-85 around Salisbury. The segment of US 52 from I-40 in Winston-Salem to Lexington was upgraded to Interstate highway standards and cosigned as I-285 in 2018. The segment through Winston-Salem is also expected to be upgraded so that I-285 can be extended to the Winston-Salem Northern Beltway near Rural Hall. From the beltway to just south of Mount Airy, US 52 is expected to form part of the I-74 corridor through North Carolina.

South of the Triad area after splitting from I-85 in Salisbury, US 52 is typically a two-lane route linking some of the state's smaller cities and towns. Albemarle is the largest municipality along this segment of US 52 to the South Carolina state line.

Between Salisbury and Albemarle in Northern Stanly County, US 52 bisects the campus of Pfeiffer University in Misenheimer.

== History ==
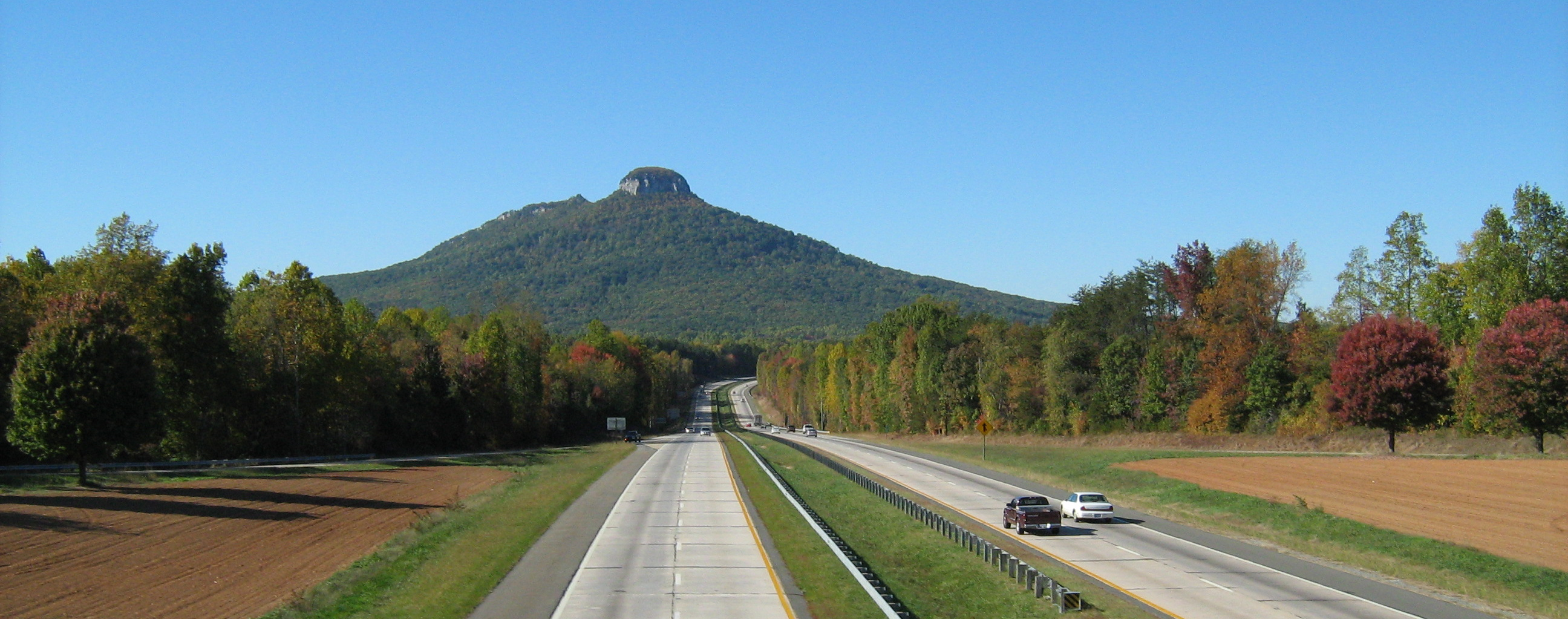
US 52 at the base of Pilot Mountain

US 52 was established in 1934 as a replacement of US 121/NC 66 from the Virginia state line, near Mount Airy, to Lexington and replacement of US 601/NC 80 from Lexington to the South Carolina state line, near McFarlan.

In the mid-1930s, US 52 was placed on current routing between Rocky River-Norwood and Misenheimer-Gold Hill. In Wadesboro, US 52 was routed along Morgan-Washington-Martin Streets; while in Stokes County, US 52 was placed on new road between Pilot Mountain and King.

In 1941, US 52 was removed from Salisbury Road and placed on its current routing, with US 29/70, south of Lexington. Between 1945 and 1949, US 52 was split in downtown Winston-Salem: northbound using the original Main Street route, southbound using Liberty Street and First Street. In 1949, US 52 was placed on a new bypass east of Pilot Mountain, leaving US 52A along the main street route.

In 1952, US 52 was placed onto new northern bypass of Lexington, its old route through became part of US 29A/70A and NC 8. In 1953, US 52 was placed onto new western bypass of Mount Airy, its old route through became US 52A (today US 52 Business). In either 1956 or 1957, US 52 was placed on its current route through Wadesboro, via US 74; also around same time period, US 52 was removed from Old Fancy Gap Road near the Virginia state line.

From 1960 to 1972, the next series of changes were in the Winston-Salem area; starting in 1960 with US 52 moving from Main Street onto Old Salem Road. In 1962, US 52 northbound was changed to Main Street, Fifth Street, and Liberty Street. By 1964, US 52 was placed onto new freeway from Winston-Salem, just south of East-West Expressway, to Pilot Mountain; this replaced the old route from Stanleyville to Pilot Mountain, becoming simply Old US 52. By 1973, US 52 was completely moved onto the completed North-South Expressway in Forsyth County, fully removing US 52 from all regular roads through the county.

In 1971, US 52 was joined with I-85, from the Yadkin River to Salisbury, leaving the downtown area. In 1980, the freeway from Forsyth County extended into Davidson County at Midway. By 1982, US 52 in New London was placed on a short bypass west of town. Between 1985 and 1987, US 52 was given its current Albemarle bypass routing; in October 2010, the routing was rebuilt along its southern portion. Between 1991 and 1993, US 52 was extended further south onto new freeway from Midway to Welcome in north Davidson County; by 1995, the freeway connected with the Lexington bypass, completing US 52's move from rural road to freeway from Lexington to Mount Airy.

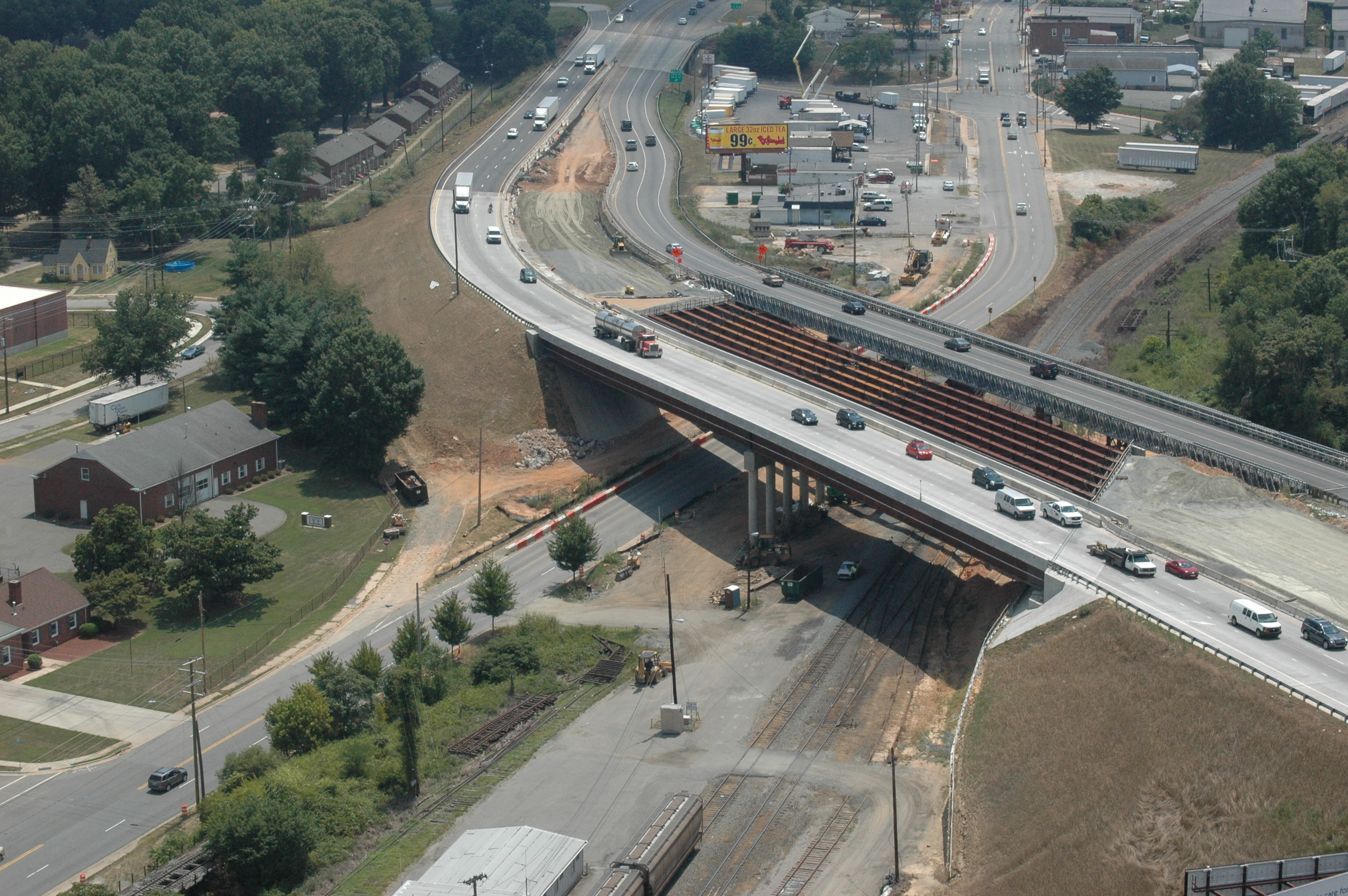
Construction of replacement bridges over Liberty Street

Throughout most of the 2010s, a series of road improvements were made along US 52 in Winston-Salem, including replacement of bridges, interchanges and widening of lanes and shoulders. The initial change was a replacement of the Liberty Street bridges (built in 1964) over Liberty Street and the Norfolk Southern Railroad Switching Yard. The project included the permanent ramp closure of exit 111-B, on February 19, 2011; the entire project was completed on November 1, 2012. In 2012, exit 110-A to Third, Fourth, Fifth Street was permanently closed related to the widening of US 52 and extending new acceleration lanes to the neighboring interchanges. In 2013, construction began on the Salem Creek Connector (later becoming an extension of Research Parkway), at a cost of $68.9 million, it involved reconfiguring exit 108-B (replacing Vargrave Street with Research Parkway), the permanent closure of 108-C (Stadium Drive, later renamed Rams Drive), bridge replacements (including a truss flyover for Norfolk Southern) and the realignment of area roads. On January 6, 2014, exit 108-B was closed and Vargrave Street razed. On July 12, 2017, exit 108-B reopened to the public as Research Parkway, utilizing a diverging diamond interchange layout; exit 108-C to Rams Drive was then permanently closed, with a bridge replacement completed shortly after.

In addition to the upgrades in Winston-Salem, US 52 was also upgraded to interstate grade between I-85 and I-40/US 311. Approved by the American Association of State Highway and Transportation Officials (AASHTO) in September 2005, after receiving an earlier approval from the Federal Highway Administration (FHWA) in July 2005, intending to provide an Interstate-quality freeway to connect Winston-Salem to Charlotte (via a portion of I-85). The North Carolina Department of Transportation (NCDOT) installed "Future Interstate 285 Corridor" signs along the route in February 2006. The initial $2.5-million (equivalent to $3.43 million in 2024) project to improve the roadway to Interstate standards was approved in October 2011. With property acquisition already started in December 2012, cost estimates rose to $8.57 million (equivalent to $11.8 million in 2024). The contract was awarded to J.T. Russell and Sons Inc. of Albemarle for $7.6 million (equivalent to $10.4 million in 2024). Construction began in March 2014 and included reconstructing shoulders, improving drainage systems, resurfacing travel lanes, and realigning Marco Boulevard to accommodate a new southbound exit ramp alignment at Green Needles Road. In addition, crews resurfaced and preserved the bridges over Swearing Creek. The project was completed in late 2017.

On February 15, 2018, based on the completed improvements, the FHWA approved the I-285 signing between I-85 and I-40.

=== U.S. Route 121 ===
U.S. Highway 121
- Location: Lexington, NC-VA state line
- Length: 64.0 mi (103.0 km)
- Existed: 1926–1934

U.S. Route 121 (US 121) was an original US highway, established in 1926, and was completely overlapped with NC 66. Beginning north from Main Street (US 70/NC 10), in Lexington, it went through Welcome and Midway to Winston-Salem. Traversing through Winston-Salem on Waughtown Road and Main Street, it exits north along Patterson Avenue to Stanleyville. Continuing north through Rural Hall, King, and Pilot Mountain, it reached downtown Mount Airy, before continuing on north into Virginia, via Old Fancy Gap Road. By 1929, US 121 was rerouted south of Winston-Salem along Spur Street; its old alignment remained part of NC 77. In late 1934, both US 121 and NC 66 were replaced by US 52.

=== Andy Griffith Parkway ===
The Andy Griffith Parkway is an 11-mile (18 km) section of U.S. Route 52 in northern Surry County, North Carolina, dedicated in honor of actor Andy Griffith. U.S. Route 52 through this stretch is a limited- controlled-access four-lane divided highway. Approximately 5.5 miles (8.9 km) of the 11-mile (18 km) section passes through the corporate limits of Griffith's hometown of Mount Airy, North Carolina.

==== Background ====
Due to its proximity to Pilot Mountain State Park, in 1977 U.S. Route 52 through Surry County and Stokes County was dedicated as the Pilot Mountain Parkway by the North Carolina Department of Transportation. However, in March 2002, the North Carolina Department of Transportation was approached by a grassroots group of residents of Mount Airy that felt that a highway dedication for Griffith was long overdue.

The group proposed to rename an 11-mile (18 km) section of the Pilot Mountain Parkway running from the Interstate 74 interchange north to the Virginia state line as the Andy Griffith Parkway. The Pilot Mountain Parkway designation would remain from the I-74 intersection south through Stokes County.

The group had the support of the dedication from several North Carolina state agency officials that included Governor Mike Easley, State Treasurer Richard H. Moore and NCDOT Division 11 Board Member Sam Erby. Each of these officials played an integral role in expediting the renaming through the North Carolina Department of Transportation's Road and Bridge Naming Committee. The dedication also had the full support of Andy Griffith. The NCDOT Road and Bridge Naming Committee voted unanimously for the dedication at their July 2002 meeting in Raleigh, North Carolina.

==== Dedication ceremony ====
A dedication ceremony was held on October 16, 2002, in the parking lot behind City Hall in Mount Airy. Andy Griffith accepted the invitation to attend the ceremony. It was Griffith's first public appearance in his hometown in over 40 years. Also in attendance were Griffith's wife Cindi Griffith, Governor Mike Easley, former University of North Carolina President William C. Friday, Grandfather Mountain developer Hugh Morton, as well as many more state and local officials. More than 3000 Andy Griffith fans also attended to welcome Griffith back to Mount Airy.

=== Dedicated and memorial names ===
US 52 features three additional dedicated stretches of highway.

- George S. Coble Memorial Highway – Official North Carolina name of US 52, from Old US 52 at the Davidson-Forsyth County line to US 29/70 south of Lexington.
- John Gold Memorial Freeway – Official North Carolina name of US 52 within the borders of Forsyth County.
- Pilot Mountain Parkway – Official North Carolina name of US 52, it originally went from King to the Virginia state line. In 2002, it was shortened to the I-74 interchange south of Mount Airy, for the Andy Griffith Parkway.

== Future ==
In 2011 there were plans to widen US 52 between Wadesboro and NC 24/NC 27, in Albemarle, to four-lanes by around 2015 (STIP: R-2320).

In the more distant future, US 52 between NC 74, in Winston-Salem, and I-74, near Mount Airy, is planned to be reconstructed to interstate-grade standards as part of I-74 (STIP: I-4404).

== Junction list ==
County	Location	mi	km	Exit	Destinations	Notes
Anson	McFarlan	0.0	0.0		US 52 east – Cheraw	Continuation from South Carolina
Anson	Morven	4.4	7.1		NC 145 (Main Street) – Rockingham, Chesterfield	
Anson	Wadesboro	12.2	19.6		US 74 east – Rockingham	East end of US 74 overlap
Anson	Wadesboro	13.5	21.7		NC 109 / NC 742 south (Greene Street)	South end of NC 742 overlap
Anson	Wadesboro	14.6	23.5		US 74 west – Monroe, Charlotte	West end of US 74 overlap
Anson	Wadesboro	14.9	24.0		NC 742 north – Oakboro	North end of NC 742 overlap
Stanly		30.5	49.1		NC 731 west – Mount Gilead	
Stanly		41.5	66.8		NC 138 south – Oakboro	
Stanly	Albemarle	42.4	68.2		US 52 Bus. north / NC 24 / NC 27 / NC 73 east – Troy, Mount Gilead, Charlotte	East end of NC 73 overlap
Stanly	Albemarle	43.3	69.7		NC 73 west (Main Street) – Concord	West end of NC 73 overlap
Stanly	Albemarle	44.7	71.9		US 52 Bus. south (First Street)	
Stanly	New London	50.4	81.1		NC 8 north / NC 740 south (Gold Street) – Badin	
Stanly	Richfield	53.6	86.3		NC 49 – Concord, Charlotte, Asheboro	
Cabarrus	No major junctions					
Rowan	Rockwell	63.6	102.4		NC 152 west (Market Street) – China Grove	
Rowan	Salisbury	72.0	115.9	76	I-85 south / Innes Street – Charlotte, Salisbury Downtown	South end of I-85 overlap
Rowan	Spencer	74.9	120.5	79	Andrews Street – Spencer, East Spencer	
Rowan	Spencer	76.3	122.8	81	Long Ferry Road – Spencer	
Rowan	Yadkin River	78.2	125.9	Yadkin River Veterans Memorial Bridge		
Davidson		78.7	126.7	82	US 29 south / US 70 west / NC 150 east – Spencer	Permanently closed as of April, 2010
Davidson		79.0	127.1	83	NC 150	Permanently closed as of May, 2013
Davidson		79.3	127.6	84	US 29 south / US 70 west to NC 150 – Spencer	South end of US 29 and west end of US 70 overlap
Davidson		80.3	129.2	85	Clark Road	Permanently closed as of November, 2012
Davidson		81.4	131.0	86	Belmont Road	
Davidson	Lexington	83.3	134.1	87	I-85 north / I-285 begin – High Point, Greensboro	North end of I-85 and south end of I-285/I-85 Bus overlap; northbound exit and southbound entrance
Davidson	Lexington	84.0	135.2	84	NC 47 east to I-85 north	To Davidson County Airport
Davidson	Lexington	84.9	136.6	85	Green Needles Road	
Davidson	Lexington	86.0	138.4	86	Salisbury Road – Downtown Lexington	
Davidson	Lexington	87.0	140.0	87	US 29 north / US 70 east – Thomasville, High Point	North end of US 29 and east end of US 70 overlap; northbound exit and southbound entrance
Davidson	Lexington	88.6	142.6	89	US 64 – Lexington, Mocksville	
Davidson	Welcome	92.2	148.4	92	NC 8 south (Old U.S. Hwy 52) – Lexington, Welcome	South end of NC 8 overlap
Davidson	Welcome	97.3	156.6	97	Old U.S. Hwy 52 – Midway	
Davidson	Midway	99.5	160.1	100	Hickory Tree Road	
Forsyth	Winston-Salem	102.8	165.4	103	South Main Street	
Forsyth	Winston-Salem	105.1	169.1	105	Clemmonsville Road	
Forsyth	Winston-Salem	106.2	170.9	107	I-40 east / I-285 end – Greensboro, High Point I-40 west – Statesville	North end of I-285; signed as exits 107A (east) and 107B (west)
Forsyth	Winston-Salem	107.0	172.2	108A	Sprague Street / Waughtown Street	To University of North Carolina School of the Arts
Forsyth	Winston-Salem	107.8	173.5	108B	Research Parkway – Old Salem, Winston-Salem State University	DDI; formerly Vargrave Street prior to January 6, 2014
Forsyth	Winston-Salem	108.2	174.1	108C	Stadium Drive – Old Salem	Permanently closed as of July 12, 2017
Forsyth	Winston-Salem	108.5	174.6	109	US 158 east / US 421 south / NC 150 east – Kernersville US 158 west / US 421 north / NC 150 west – Downtown	Signed as exits 109A (east) and 109B (west)
Forsyth	Winston-Salem	108.9	175.3	110A	3rd 4th 5th Streets – Downtown	Permanently closed in 2012
Forsyth	Winston-Salem	109.3	175.9	110B	US 311 north (ML King Jr Drive)	
Forsyth	Winston-Salem	109.6	176.4	110C	Liberty Street	
Forsyth	Winston-Salem	109.9	176.9	110D	Northwest Boulevard	Southbound exit only
Forsyth	Winston-Salem	110.6	178.0	111A	25th Street / 28th Street	
Forsyth	Winston-Salem	110.9	178.5	111B	Liberty Street – Smith Reynolds Airport	Was northbound exit only; permanently closed as of February 19, 2011
Forsyth	Winston-Salem	111.8	179.9	112	Akron Drive – Smith Reynolds Airport	To Coliseum and BB&T Field
Forsyth	Winston-Salem	112.6	181.2	113	Patterson Avenue	
Forsyth	Winston-Salem	114.2	183.8	114	NC 8 north (Germanton Road) – Germanton	North end of NC 8 overlap
Forsyth	Winston-Salem	115.5	185.9	115	University Parkway	Signed northbound as exits 115A (north) and 115B (south)
Forsyth	Winston-Salem	116.1	186.8	116	Hanes Mill Road	
Forsyth	Bethania	117.5	189.1	117	To NC 66 – Germanton	Former northbound entrance and southbound exit; permanently closed on December 9, 2019
Forsyth	Rural Hall	116.8	188.0	117	I-74 east – High Point	Southbound exit and northbound entrance opened to traffic on November 19, 2023; rest of the interchange remains under construction
Forsyth	Rural Hall	118.1	190.1	118	NC 65 – Rural Hall, Bethania	
Forsyth	Rural Hall	119.8	192.8	39	Westinghouse Road	
Forsyth	King	121.9	196.2	36	Moore-RJR Drive	
Forsyth	King	123.0	197.9	35	Main Street – King, Tobaccoville	
Stokes		128.7	207.1	29	Perch Road – Pinnacle	
Surry		130.8	210.5	27	Pilot Knob Park Road – Pilot Mountain State Park	
Surry	Pilot Mountain	133.7	215.2	24	NC 268 – Pilot Mountain, Elkin	Double roundabout interchange
Surry		135.5	218.1	22	West 52 Bypass – Pilot Mountain	Northbound entrance and left southbound exit only
Surry		136.1	219.0	21	Cook School Road	
Surry		139.7	224.8	18 140	I-74 west to I-77 – Wytheville	
Surry		141.0	226.9	141	Holly Springs Church Road	To Mount Airy/Surry County Airport
Surry		142.0	228.5		US 52 Bus. north (Main Street)	
Surry	Mount Airy	144.4	232.4		US 601 south (Rockford Street) – Dobson	
Surry	Mount Airy	145.6	234.3		NC 89 (Pine Street) to I-74 west / I-77 – Downtown	
Surry	Mount Airy	147.7	237.7		US 52 Bus. south (Main Street)	
Surry		150.3	241.9		US 52 north – Hillsville	Continuation into Virginia
1.000 mi = 1.609 km; 1.000 km = 0.621 mi: Closed/former; Concurrency terminus; Incomplete access; Unopened

== See also ==
- Special routes of U.S. Route 52
- High Rock Lake
- Pee Dee National Wildlife Refuge
- Pee Dee River
- Pilot Mountain State Park
- Rocky River
- Yadkin River

U.S. Route 52
Previous state: Virginia	North Carolina	Next state: South Carolina
