= North Carolina Highway 47 =

State highway in North Carolina, US

North Carolina Highway 47

Route information
- Maintained by NCDOT
- Length: 24.3 mi (39.1 km)
- Existed: 1972–present

Major junctions
- West end: I-285 / I-85 BL / US 29 / US 52 / US 70 in Lexington
- I-85 in Lexington
- East end: NC 49 near Denton

Location
- Country: United States
- State: North Carolina
- Counties: Davidson, Randolph

Highway system
- North Carolina Highway System; Interstate; US; State; Scenic
← NC 46	→ NC 48

North Carolina Highway 47 (NC 47) is a primary state highway in the U.S. state of North Carolina. It travels east–west through Davidson and Randolph counties; connecting the town of Denton with nearby Lexington and Asheboro.

== Route description ==
Its western terminus is at the Interstate 285, Interstate 85 Business (I-85 Bus.), U.S. Route 29 (US 29), US 52, and US 70 interchange (exit 84) in Lexington. Heading in a southern direction, it connects with I-85, where NC 47 provides a connector between southbound I-85 with northbound I-85 Bus and vice versa. Continuing south, it travels through the community of Linwood, where it turns east, crossing NC 8 and Abbots Creek. Continuing in a southeasterly direction, NC 47 makes its way into the heart of Denton. After joining NC 109 for less than a mile, NC 47 exits Denton along Bombay Road to its eastern terminus at NC 49.

== History ==
NC 47 first appeared in 1935 when NC 40A was re-signed. This early NC 47 ran from US 158 in Roanoke Rapids to US 301 in Pleasant Hill. Sometime between 1951 and 1953, it was subsumed by NC 48.

The current NC 47 was established in 1972 as a new primary routing between NC 8 to NC 109, in Denton; this was an upgrade of a combination of several secondary roads. In 1974, NC 47 was extended east, as a new primary routing, to its current eastern terminus with NC 49. In 1981, NC 47 was extended west on new primary routing, through Linwood, to I-85/US 29/US 52/US 70 (exit 86). In 1993, NC 47 was rerouted north from Linwood to I-85 (exit 88); its former alignment becoming Belmont Road (SR 3159). In 2013, NC 47 was extended north to terminate at I-85 Business/US 29/US 52/US 70 (exit 84). In December 2018, NC 47 was adjusted at its western terminus from the northbound I-285 exit/entrance ramps to a continuation along Hargrave Lane (at Aviation Way) to the overpass bridge at I-285.

== Major intersections ==
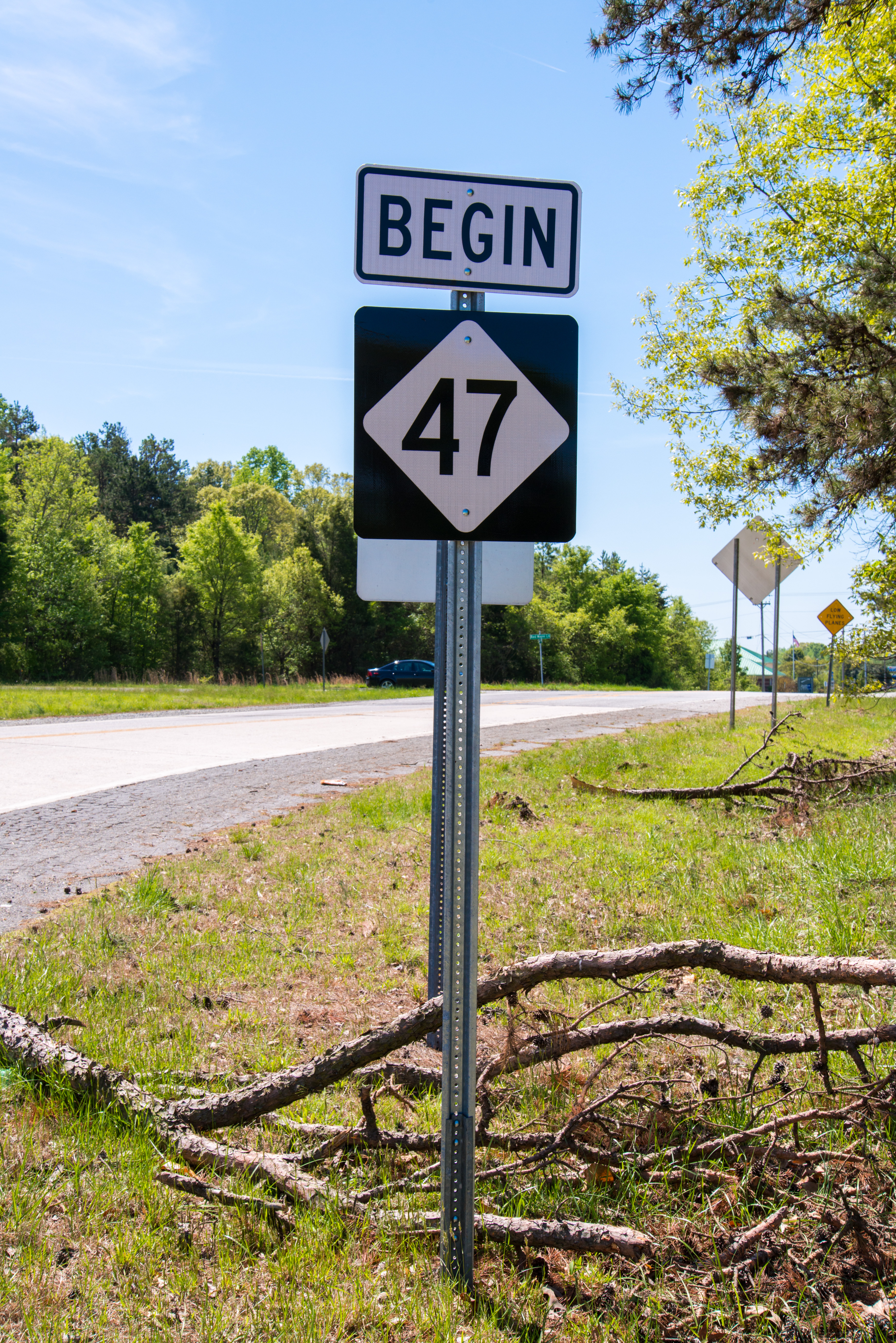
Western terminus of NC 47, in Lexington

County	Location	mi	km	Destinations	Notes
Davidson	Lexington	0.0	0.0	I-285 / I-85 BL / US 29 / US 52 / US 70 – Salisbury, Lexington, Winston-Salem	
Davidson	Lexington	0.4	0.64	I-85 – Charlotte, Greensboro	
Davidson	Linwood	1.9	3.1	Belmont Road	
Davidson		5.5	8.9	NC 8 (Cotton Grove Road) – Southmont, Lexington	
Davidson	Denton	19.2	30.9	NC 109 north (Glenn Street) – Thomasville	North end of NC 109 overlap
Davidson	Denton	19.2	30.9	NC 109 south (Glenn Street) – Troy	South end of NC 109 overlap
Randolph		24.3	39.1	NC 49 – Richfield, Asheboro	
1.000 mi = 1.609 km; 1.000 km = 0.621 mi: Concurrency terminus
