= Bethesda, North Carolina =

Bethesda, North Carolina may refer to:

- Bethesda, Davidson County, North Carolina
- Bethesda, Durham County, North Carolina
