= McFarlan, North Carolina =

- Town
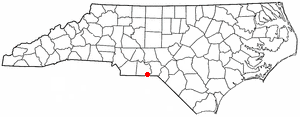
- Location of McFarlan, North Carolina
- Coordinates: 34°48′53″N 79°58′36″W
- Country: United States
- State: North Carolina
- County: Anson
- Founded: 1883
- Incorporated: 1885
- Named for: Allan McFarland

Area
  - Total: 0.92 sq mi (2.38 km^{2})
  - Land: 0.92 sq mi (2.38 km^{2})
  - Water: 0 sq mi (0.00 km^{2})
- Elevation: 299 ft (91 m)

Population (2020)
  - Total: 94
  - Density: 102.2/sq mi (39.47/km^{2})
- Time zone: UTC-5 (Eastern (EST))
  - Summer (DST): UTC-4 (EDT)
- ZIP code: 28102
- Area code: 704
- FIPS code: 37-40240
- GNIS feature ID: 2406130

McFarlan is a town in Anson County, North Carolina, United States. The population was 94 at the 2020 census. The town was named after Alan McFarland, a railroad official.

== Geography ==
According to the United States Census Bureau, the town has a total area of 0.9 square miles (2.3 km^{2}), all land.

McFarlan is located on U.S. Route 52 by the South Carolina border.

== Demographics ==
Historical population
Census	Pop.	Note	%±
1900	112		—
1910	186		66.1%
1920	219		17.7%
1930	138		−37.0%
1940	184		33.3%
1950	136		−26.1%
1960	161		18.4%
1970	140		−13.0%
1980	133		−5.0%
1990	98		−26.3%
2000	89		−9.2%
2010	117		31.5%
2020	94		−19.7%
2021 (est.)	95	▲	1.1%
U.S. Decennial Census

As of the census of 2000, there were 89 people, 38 households, and 24 families residing in the town. The population density was 96.0 inhabitants per square mile (37.1/km^{2}). There were 44 housing units at an average density of 47.5 per square mile (18.3/km^{2}). The racial makeup of the town was 94.38% White and 5.62% African American.

There were 38 households, out of which 23.7% had children under the age of 18 living with them, 50.0% were married couples living together, 10.5% had a female householder with no husband present, and 36.8% were non-families. 34.2% of all households were made up of individuals, and 15.8% had someone living alone who was 65 years of age or older. The average household size was 2.34 and the average family size was 3.04.

In the town, the population was spread out, with 23.6% under the age of 18, 2.2% from 18 to 24, 25.8% from 25 to 44, 24.7% from 45 to 64, and 23.6% who were 65 years of age or older. The median age was 43 years. For every 100 females, there were 74.5 males. For every 100 females age 18 and over, there were 83.8 males.

The median income for a household in the town was $26,875, and the median income for a family was $52,917. Males had a median income of $32,188 versus $15,833 for females. The per capita income for the town was $17,295. There were 16.7% of families and 14.5% of the population living below the poverty line, including no under eighteens and 45.5% of those over 64.
