= New London, North Carolina =

- Town
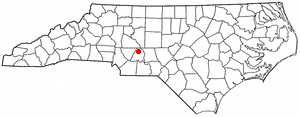
- Location of New London, North Carolina
- Coordinates: 35°26′06″N 80°13′11″W
- Country: United States
- State: North Carolina
- County: Stanly
- Founded: 1830
- Incorporated: March 25, 1891
- Named for: An English mining company

Area
  - Total: 1.98 sq mi (5.12 km^{2})
  - Land: 1.98 sq mi (5.12 km^{2})
  - Water: 0 sq mi (0.00 km^{2})
- Elevation: 666 ft (203 m)

Population (2020)
  - Total: 607
  - Density: 307.3/sq mi (118.64/km^{2})
- Time zone: UTC-5 (Eastern (EST))
  - Summer (DST): UTC-4 (EDT)
- ZIP code: 28127
- Area code: 704
- FIPS code: 37-46820
- GNIS feature ID: 2406978
- Website: https://www.newlondonnc.org/

New London is a town in Stanly County, North Carolina, United States. As of the 2020 census, New London had a population of 607. The town lies between Albemarle and Richfield along U.S. 52 in the southern Piedmont region of the state, approximately 45 miles (72 km) east-northeast of Charlotte. It was the site of a gold mine, which was active during periods of the mid-1800s and early 1900s.

== History ==
New London was founded as the unincorporated settlement of Bilesville, north of Albemarle, circa 1830, and named after Thomas "Uncle Tommy" Biles, a local landowner and farmer. At the time, the land was part of Montgomery County until Stanly County was formed in 1841. Near the area where the first Carolina Gold Rush took place, gold was found near Bilesville and the first mine was opened in 1859, though it closed during the Civil War. When the New London & States Company purchased the mine to reopen it in the early 1870s, and at the suggestion of company executive W. A. Judd, the settlement voted to rename itself after the company. The settlement became officially incorporated as a town on March 25, 1891. The main gold mine, known as the Parker Mine (after the farmer on whose land it was discovered) ceased operation in 1894, though several other local industries continued to provide employment for the town, including a cordage mill, a lumber mill, a brick mill, and a livery stable. In 1923, less than three years after the adoption of the Nineteenth Amendment granting women the right to vote, the town elected Mrs. T. V. Staton as their mayor, becoming the first female mayor, as well as the first female to serve in municipal government in the state. The mine was reopened for a time starting in 1934, and throughout the 1920s and 1930s, modern amenities such as telephone service, electrical service, paved roads, and a state highway were built in town. Town sewer and water service was completed in 2002.

== Government ==
As of January 2021, The Town Board of New London consists of:

- Tate Daniels, Mayor
- Bill Peak, Mayor Pro-Tem
- Christy Starnes, Commissioner
- Dan Phillips, Commissioner
- Johnny Chestnut, Commissioner
- Marcus Mullis, Commissioner
- Virginia Thompson, Deputy Clerk
- Susan Almond, Town Administrator
- Jame Russell, Future School Board Supervisor

== Geography ==
According to the United States Census Bureau, the town has a total area of 0.6 square miles (1.6 km^{2}), all land.

== Demographics ==
Historical population
Census	Pop.	Note	%±
1890	317		—
1900	299		−5.7%
1910	312		4.3%
1920	228		−26.9%
1930	246		7.9%
1940	243		−1.2%
1950	285		17.3%
1960	223		−21.8%
1970	285		27.8%
1980	454		59.3%
1990	414		−8.8%
2000	326		−21.3%
2010	600		84.0%
2020	607		1.2%
U.S. Decennial Census

=== 2020 census ===
New London racial composition
Race	Number	Percentage
White (non-Hispanic)	510	84.02%
Black or African American (non-Hispanic)	35	5.77%
Native American	2	0.33%
Asian	26	4.28%
Other/Mixed	22	3.62%
Hispanic or Latino	12	1.98%

As of the 2020 United States census, there were 607 people, 245 households, and 189 families residing in the town.

=== 2000 census ===
As of the census of 2000, there were 326 people, 131 households, and 94 families residing in the town. The population density was 530.7 inhabitants per square mile (204.9/km^{2}). There were 144 housing units at an average density of 234.4 per square mile (90.5/km^{2}). The racial makeup of the town was 90.80% White, 5.83% African American, 0.61% Native American, 0.92% Asian, 0.61% from other races, and 1.23% from two or more races. Hispanic or Latino of any race were 0.61% of the population.

There were 131 households, out of which 34.4% had children under the age of 18 living with them, 53.4% were married couples living together, 12.2% had a female householder with no husband present, and 28.2% were non-families. 25.2% of all households were made up of individuals, and 8.4% had someone living alone who was 65 years of age or older. The average household size was 2.49 and the average family size was 2.90.

In the town, the population was spread out, with 26.7% under the age of 18, 8.0% from 18 to 24, 29.4% from 25 to 44, 24.2% from 45 to 64, and 11.7% who were 65 years of age or older. The median age was 36 years. For every 100 females, there were 96.4 males. For every 100 females age 18 and over, there were 82.4 males.

The median income for a household in the town was $42,188, and the median income for a family was $51,429. Males had a median income of $31,806 versus $25,000 for females. The per capita income for the town was $18,520. About 5.2% of families and 6.5% of the population were below the poverty line, including 1.1% of those under age 18 and 29.4% of those age 65 or over.

== Transportation ==
One US highway and two North Carolina State Highways cross New London:

- US 52 crosses from the northwest corner to the southern border of town, connecting to Richfield in the north and Albemarle in the south.
- NC 8 has its southern terminus at US 52 near the southern border of New London, following Main Street north out of town through an unincorporated portion of Stanly County.
- NC 740 has its northern terminus at US 52 near the western border New London, following Gold Street east out of town and connecting to the town of Badin.

== Notable people ==
- Chris Buescher (born 1992), NASCAR driver, lives in town
- Donald Byrd (born 1949), modern dance choreographer
- Rhett Lowder (born 2002), Wake Forest University pitcher
- Antonio Williams (born 1997), Buffalo Bills running back
