= North Carolina Highway 731 =

State highway in North Carolina, US

North Carolina Highway 731

Route information
- Maintained by NCDOT
- Length: 25.9 mi (41.7 km)
- Existed: 1936–present

Major junctions
- West end: US 52 near Norwood
- East end: US 220 Alt. / NC 211 in Candor

Location
- Country: United States
- State: North Carolina
- Counties: Stanly, Montgomery

Highway system
- North Carolina Highway System; Interstate; US; State; Scenic
| ← NC 711 | → NC 740 |

North Carolina Highway 731 (NC 731) is a primary state highway in the U.S. state of North Carolina. The highway serves as the main thoroughfare in southern Montgomery County.

== Route description ==
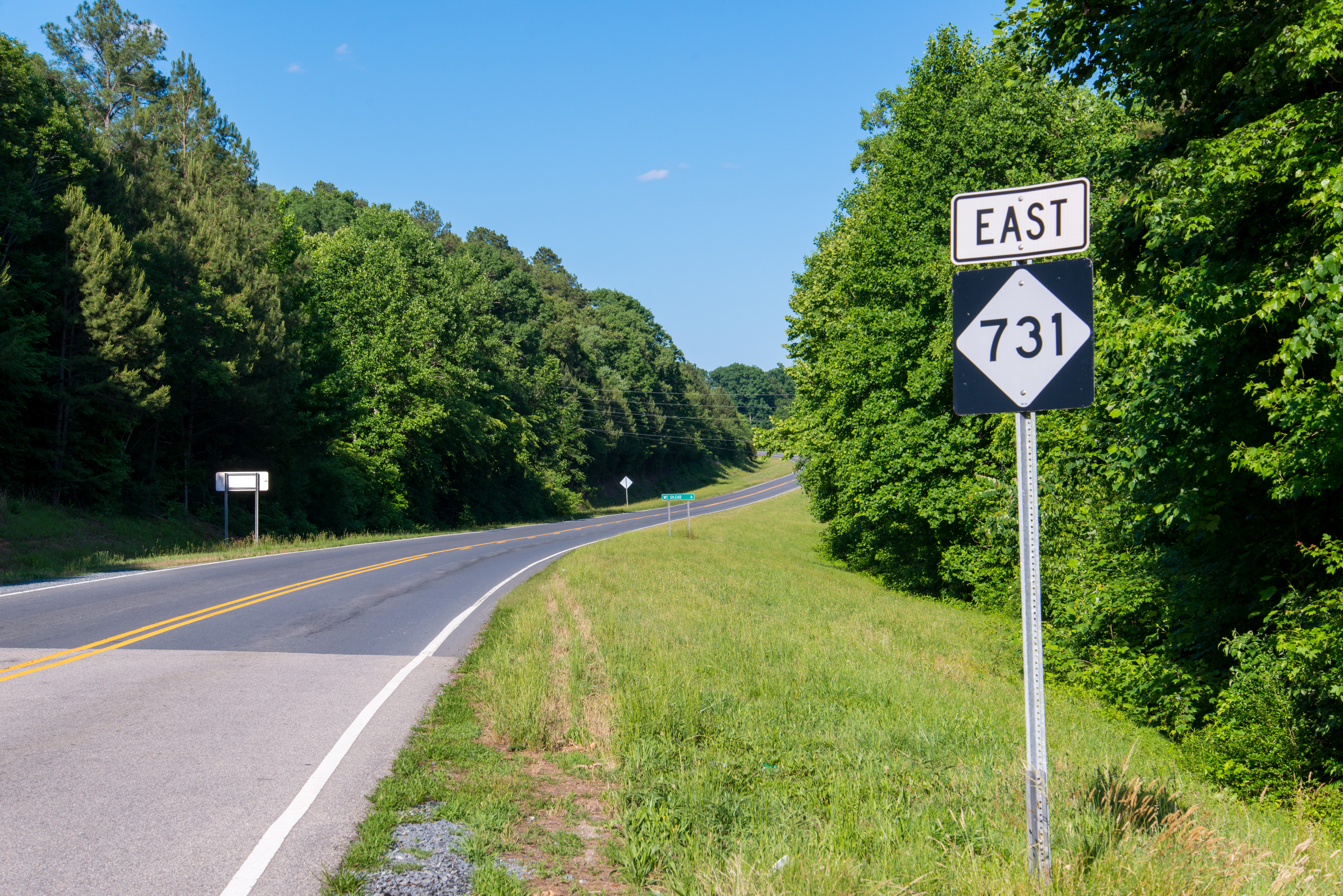
Eastbound NC 731, towards Mount Gilead

NC 731 is a two-lane rural highway that traverses 25.9 miles (41.7 km). Beginning at U.S. Route 52 (US 52) south of Norwood, it goes west crossing the Pee Dee River and through Mount Gilead. In Mount Gilead, NC 731 intersects NC 109 and NC 73 and has a concurrency with the unsigned NC 109 Business (NC 109 Bus.). Forming the southern boundary of the Uwharrie National Forest, it continues a northwesterly direction, linking up with US 220 Alternate (US 220 Alt.) as it enters Candor. At the center of Candor, NC 731 ends, connecting with NC 211 and US 220 Alt. continuing north to Biscoe.

=== Dedicated and memorial names ===
NC 731 has one dedicated bridge along its route.

- J. F. Allen Bridge – Bridge over the Pee Dee River, just south from the Norwood Dam, dedicated on November 2, 1972.

== History ==
Established by 1936 as a new primary routing from the community of Hydro, going east through Mount Gilead and ending at US 220 south of Candor. Between 1947 and 1948, NC 731 was rerouted north to end at US 220 closer to Candor, leaving behind Tabernacle Church Road (SR 1524). In 1974, NC 731 was rerouted south of Hydro, crossing the Pee Dee River and ending at its current western terminus at US 52; its old alignment to becoming Hydro Road (SR 1188). In 1981, NC 731 was extended northward into downtown Candor to its current eastern terminus with US 220 Alt./NC 211.

== Junction list ==
| County | Location | mi | km | Destinations | Notes |
|---|---|---|---|---|---|
| Stanly | | 0.0 | 0.0 | US 52 – Wadesboro, Norwood, Albemarle | |
| Montgomery | Mount Gilead | 6.3 | 10.1 | NC 109 (Wadesboro Boulevard) – Wadesboro, Troy | South end of NC 109 Bus. hidden overlap |
| Montgomery | Mount Gilead | 6.5 | 10.5 | NC 73 / NC 109 Bus. north (Main Street) – Ellerbe, Albemarle | North end of NC 109 Bus. hidden overlap |
| Montgomery | Candor | 24.7 | 39.8 | US 220 Alt. south – Norman | South end of US 220 Alt. overlap |
| Montgomery | Candor | 25.9 | 41.7 | US 220 Alt. north / NC 211 east – Biscoe, Seven Lakes, Pinehurst | North end of US 220 Alt. overlap |
1.000 mi = 1.609 km; 1.000 km = 0.621 mi: Concurrency terminus
