= Donald Byrd (choreographer) =

American modern dance choreographer (born 1949)

- Born: 1949 (age 76–77); New London, North Carolina
- Education: Tufts University (BA)
- Occupations: Dancer, choreographer, director
- Years active: 1974–
- Awards: Bessie Award (1992, for The Minstrel Show)

Donald Byrd (born 1949) is an American modern dance choreographer, known for themes relating to social justice, and in particular, racism.

== Early life and education ==
Byrd was born July 21, 1949, in New London, North Carolina, to Jeter Byrd Jr., and Emmarene Clark (maiden; 1928–1999). His parents divorced shortly after he was born; and soon after that, with his mother, he moved from New London to Clearwater, Florida. Donald's mother remarried and, around the time he was entering the fifth grade, she and her new husband moved to the Midwest. Donald stayed in Clearwater and was raised by his maternal grandmother, Willie Mae Clark (née Willie Mae Chester; 1910–1993), (Note: Byrd's Harlem Nutcracker, premiered 3 years after the death of his grandmother. His work prominently and lovingly features a grandmother.) through high school, until he graduated 1967 from Pinellas High, a bygone segregated school (closed after June 1968) in the Greenwood section of downtown Clearwater. (Note: Pinellas High School, in Clearwater, served African-0American students from Largo, Clearwater, Dunedin, Safety Harbor, and Tarpon Springs from 1934 to 1968, when desegregation commenced. The school was originally on Madison Avenue, but in 1954, a new school was built on Palmetto Street, the current site of Clearwater Intermediate. ("Remembering Pinellas High School," by Valerie Kalfrin, February 28, 2012), Patch Media, February 28, 1928)) Growing up, his first love, according to biographies, was music. To that end, Byrd studied classical flute; and as a flutist, he became a member of the Pinellas Youth Symphony. He was also a drum major with the Pinellas High School band – the Panthers Marching Band. In high school, Byrd participated in theatrical projects and the debate team.

Byrd's first exposure to dance came when he was 16 years old. Two dancers from Balanchine's New York City Ballet – Edward Villella and Patricia McBride – conducted a lecture-demonstration in Clearwater, which Byrd attended. The dancers left an impression on Byrd, though it was several years later before he began formal training in dance.

In 1967, Byrd attended Yale University, initially majoring in philosophy, though he had thoughts of becoming an actor. At Yale, Byrd attended every play produced by the School of Drama and the Long Wharf Theatre. Yale was also where Byrd experienced overt racism for the first time, in the form of slurs and insults, these contrasting with the institutionalized racism of segregation that he had encountered growing up in the South.

The summer after his first year, Byrd's prowess on the flute earned him the opportunity to join an ensemble that toured Europe. On his return from Europe, Byrd decided to leave Yale, where he did not feel entirely welcome, and enroll in Tufts University in Boston.

One of the first friends Byrd made at Tufts was William Hurt. By this time, Byrd had begun to study acting seriously. It was from Hurt that Byrd first heard about the Alvin Ailey Dance Theater. On Hurt's suggestion, Byrd attended a performance of Ailey's signature work, Revelations. As put by his biography in Encyclopedia.com, "the performance was indeed a revelation for Byrd; for the first time in his life, he became aware of the theatrical power of dance."

=== Higher education timeline ===
1967–1968: Attended Yale University for one year
1968–1974: Attended Tufts University and, in 1974, earned a Bachelor of Arts degree
Studied with Mia Slavenska for six years
1969–1973: Attended Cambridge School of Ballet, Cambridge, Massachusetts (Note: Cambridge School of Ballet was founded in 1953 by Esther Brooks (née Esther Magruder; born 1925), in Cambridge, Massachusetts. Brooks had studied at the School of American Ballet. She was married to American poet Peter Chardon Brooks (1918–2000), who was a great-great grandson of Peter Chardon Brooks (1767–1849) and grandson of Shepherd Brook0s (1837–1922). Esther had previously been married to American violinist Paul Makanowitzky (1920–1998). By way of her sister, Agnes Ethel Magruder (maiden; 1921–2013), Esther was a sister-in-law of Armenian American painter Arshile Gorky (1904–1948).)
Attended Harvard Summer Dance Center in the 1970s; he taught repertory dance classes there in the 1980s (Note: The Harvard Summer Dance Center was established in 1972 by Nelson Goodman (1906–1998) and Martha Armstrong Gray (née Martha Kneass Armstrong; born 1946) in collaboration with Harvard University. At Harvard, Goodman was producer of the Arts Orientation Series from 1969 to 1971, consultant in the Arts for Summer School from 1971 to 1977, and Director of the Dance Center. Gray served as Director of The Harvard Summer Dance Center for five years.)
1972: Attended London School of Contemporary Dance
1976: Attended Alvin Ailey American Dance Theater Center

== Career ==
In 1972, Byrd began his professional career as a member of the Twyla Tharp Dance Company. In 1976, he was a member of Gus Solomons Jr.'s, Dance Company.

=== Donald Byrd/The Group ===
For 24 years, beginning 1978, Byrd was the founding artistic director of Donald Byrd/The Group, which toured extensively, nationally and internationally until 2002, when he suspended operations due to financial duress. The Group was based in Los Angeles from 1978 to 1983 and in New York City from 1983 to 2002.

=== The Spectrum Dance Theater ===
Since 2002, Byrd has been artistic director of The Spectrum Dance Theater, based in Seattle. He is credited with having elevated Spectrum to a company of national rank.

Spectrum Dance Theater premiered Byrd's work Shot in January 2017, at the Seattle Repertory Theater. The performance included multimedia (video) and even a lecture in the middle in an acclaimed albeit visceral depiction of the 2016 fatal shooting of Keith Lamont Scott in Charlotte, North Carolina, and the pleading of his wife, Reykia Scott – "Stop! Please don't shoot!" "Don't shoot him! Don't shoot him! He has no weapon! He has no weapon. Don't shoot him!" Charlotte is about 49 miles (79 km) from New London, Byrd's place of birth.

=== Choreographer ===
Byrd has choreographed more than 80 modern dance works for his own companies and other companies, including the Alvin Ailey American Dance Theater, the Dayton Contemporary Dance Company (for 37 years, since 1989), The Philadelphia Dance Company (Phildanco). Byrd also has choreographed for classical companies. He has worked with acclaimed theater and opera companies, including the New York Shakespeare Festival/Public Theater, La Jolla Playhouse, the Intiman Theatre, the San Francisco Opera, the Seattle Opera, and the New York City Opera.

The Alvin Ailey American Dance Theater premiered Byrd's work Greenwood on December 6, 2019, at City Center in New York City. Byrd described his work as "theater of disruption" ... "it disrupts our thinking about things, especially, in particular, things around race." The dance performance addresses the 1921 Tulsa race massacre in Tulsa's segregated Greenwood District, which, at the time, was one of the country's most affluent African-American communities, known as "America's Black Wall Street." Byrd uses the Rashomon method, depicting three scenarios of what might have happened in an elevator.

=== Educator ===
Byrd was dance instructor at the California Institute of the Arts from 1976 through 1982, a period when other notable colleagues taught there, including Cristyne Elizabeth Lawson (born 1935) (Dean), (Note: Cristyne Lawson (née Christine Elizabeth Lawson; born 1935) was an early collaborator with Alvin Ailey. The two, in 1957, were cast in leading roles in Jamaica – "the Lena Horne musical.") Larry A. Attaway (né Larry Amos Attaway; born 1949), Rebecca Bobele (1946–1995), Gloria Bowen, (Note: Gloria Bowen (Gloria Ann Bowen; born 1943) went on to teach at UCLA. She studied with Alexander Godunov and Pearl Lang. In 1990, Gloria relocated to Las Vegas and opened a studio for fencing and ballet with fencing master Mel North (né Melvyn Robert North; born 1924), whom she married in 1990. Mel was Head Fencing Coach at UCLA for 10 years. Bowen, who is 5 feet 1 inch (155 cm), has been known as the "Petite Ballerina".) Mia Slavenska (1916–2002), Tina Yuan (born 1947), (Note: Tina Yuan (née Wen-Shiu Yuan; born 1947) is most known as a member of the Alvin Ailey American Dance Theater. Yuan was born in Shanghai, but, when she was one, her parents fled to Taiwan, where she grew up. She was married to Richard Hanale Ornellas (born 1945) from 1971 to 1978. After her divorce, in the same year, 1978, she changed her legal name to Tina Wen-Shiu Yuan in a petition to become a United States naturalized citizen.) and Sandra Neels. (Note: Sandra Fawn Neels (born 1939) was, from 1963 to 1973, a dancer with the Merce Cunningham Dance Company. She went on to become a prolific choreographer. Since 1974, she has been a dance theater educator at colleges, universities, arts institutes, and pre-professional programs. Since about 1992, she has been on the faculty at Winthrop University.) Byrd taught at University of California-Santa Cruz, Ohio University, and Wesleyan University. In 1993, he was Associate Artist at the Yale Repertory Theater.

Byrd has been member of board of directors for the Dance Theater Workshop and Dance USA in Washington, D.C., the national service organization for professional dance, established in 1982.

== Awards ==
- Special mention, 3rd Grand Prix International Video Dance Festival, 1990
- Bessie Award, 1992, for The Minstrel Show
- Emerging Dance Award, Metropolitan Life Foundation
- Guggenheim Fellowship, 2025

== Selected works ==
Premier	Work	Venue	Role	Company
19??	The Rehearsal		Choreographer	
19??	Speak Easy		Choreographer	
1978	Brass Orchid		Choreographer	
March 6, 1981	Hot Time/ A Minstrel Collage	University of California, Santa Cruz	Choreographer	
1981	Theme and Variations		Choreographer	
1981	Hot Time		Choreographer	
November 3, 1983	Low Down and Dirty Rag featuring music of Ford Dabney (1883–1958)	Bessie Schönberg Theater at the Dance Theater Workshop	Choreographer	Donald Byrd/Group II
1983	P-HP (Post-Holocaust Pop) or Popular Dancing After the Bomb: A Primer	Bessie Schönberg Theater at the Dance Theater Workshop	Choreographer	
March 12, 1986	A Formal Response (Note: A Formal Response was a Byrd production in reaction to various negative reviews in 1986. The production included a video Byrd reading and then burning the clippings. (The Boston Globe, July 5, 1955, p. 23))	Japan America Theatre; Los Angeles	Choreographer	Donald Byrd/The Group
1988	Partite		Choreographer; Music by Mio Morales	Donald Byrd/The Group
1988	Enactments in Time of Plague	Symphony Space; New York City	Choreographer	Donald Byrd/The Group
December 14, 1988	Shards	City Center; New York City	Choreographer	Alvin Ailey American Dance Theater
August 4, 1989	Honey Chil' Milk	Baltimore School for the Arts	Choreographer; Director	Diverse Works '89; Maryland Art Place (in collaboration with Baltimore artists)
1991	The Minstrel Show		Choreographer	Spectrum Dance Theater
December 4, 1991	Dance at the Gym	City Center; New York City	Choreographer	Alvin Ailey American Dance Theater
1992	Drastic Cuts		Choreographer	Alvin Ailey American Dance Theater
1992	A Folk Dance		Choreographer	Alvin Ailey American Dance Theater
1993	Bristle		Choreographer	Boston Ballet II
1995	Life Situations: Daydreams on Giselle		Choreographer	
1996	Everybody		Choreographer	Philadelphia Dance Company
1996	The Beast (The Domestic Violence Project)		Choreographer	
1996	Harlem Nutcracker		Choreographer	
2002 (workshop)	Burlesque		Choreographer	Donald Byrd/The Group
2004 (workshop)	The Color Purple (musical)	Alliance Theatre; Atlanta	Choreographer	
2005	The Color Purple (musical)	Broadway Theatre; Manhattan	Choreographer	
2009	Sentimental Cannibalism		Choreographer	Spectrum Dance Theater; Seattle
October 30, 2015	Minstrel Show Revisited	Skirball Center for the Performing Arts	Choreographer	Spectrum Dance Theater; Seattle
January 2, 2017	Shot	Seattle Repertory Theater	Choreographer	Spectrum Dance Theater; Seattle
December 6, 2019	Greenwood	City Center; New York City	Choreographer	Alvin Ailey American Dance Theater

== Collaborators ==
Among many others, Byrd has collaborated with composer Mio Morales on several works, including:

- 1988: Shards, choreography by Donald Byrd; music by Mio Morales
- 1993: The Minstrel Show, acts for coons, jigaboos, and jungle bunnies, presented by Dance Theater Workshop; artistic direction and choreography by Donald Byrd; original music by Mio Morales
- Drastic Cuts, choreography by Donald Byrd; music by Mio Morales
- 1992: A Folk Dance, premiered in 1992 by the Alvin Ailey American Dance Theater; choreography by Donald Byrd; music by Mio Morales
- 1988: Partite, presented by Donald Byrd/The Group; choreography by Donald Byrd; music by Mio Morales

== Organizations ==
The Donald Byrd Dance Foundation, Inc., a New York not-for-profit corporation established February 7, 1985

== Quotes ==
In 1989 Bensonhurst, Brooklyn, Yusef Hawkins, a 16-year-old African American, was attacked, beaten, and killed by a crowd of 10 to 30 white youths. Byrd had the following comment after the event:

I felt that something about the civil rights movement didn't take, that people didn't get it, that if these kids were behaving that way, it was a clear indication that something didn't work.

— Donald Byrd
Los Angeles Times – 1992

Joan Katherine Smith had this to say about Byrd:

The most disturbing thing about Donald Byrd's Minstrel Show is this: that men and women in blackface, recreating racial parodies recognized by most people today to be unfair, can nonetheless make you laugh. And you laugh in perhaps exactly the way people laughed during those first 19th century sendups of (over and over) the same witless, clowning, superstitious black slave.

— Joan Katherine Smith
San Francisco Examiner – 1993

== Videography ==
- "Fall Studio Series 2010: An Inside Look," Spectrum Dance Theater via YouTube
- Donald Byrd: Conscientious Choreographer, via YouTube), produced by Drew Jacoby (born 1984) and Joshua Martens (flourished 2010), New York City: TenduTV (Note: Marc Kirschner founded TenduTV, Inc., in 2008, in New York City. He is General Manager.) (2011), 10 minutes; OCLC 1125895688, 8136575296, 7996990163, 7996757127, 7996812276, 7996589827, 7996876927, 7996689027
- Donald Byrd excerpt, Spectrum Dance Theater (2011)
- Shards, choreographed by Byrd, performed by Ailey 2 on their 2011 UK tour
- The Mother of Us All, Spectrum Dance Theater (2011)
- Dance, Dance, Dance, choreographed by Byrd, performed by the Spectrum Dance Theater (2016) via YouTube
- Shot, choreographed by Byrd, performed by the Spectrum Dance Theater (2017)
- Bhangra Fever, choreography by Byrd, performed by the Spectrum Dance Theater (2018)
- Donald Byrd Choreography, performed by the Spectrum Dance Theater (2019)
- Greenwood, premiered 2019 by the Alvin Ailey American Dance Theater (2019) via YouTube
- Harlem Nutcracker, discussion by Byrd, choreographed by Byrd, performed by the Spectrum Dance Theater (2019)
