= North Carolina Highway 6 =

Former state highway in North Carolina, United States

North Carolina Highway 6

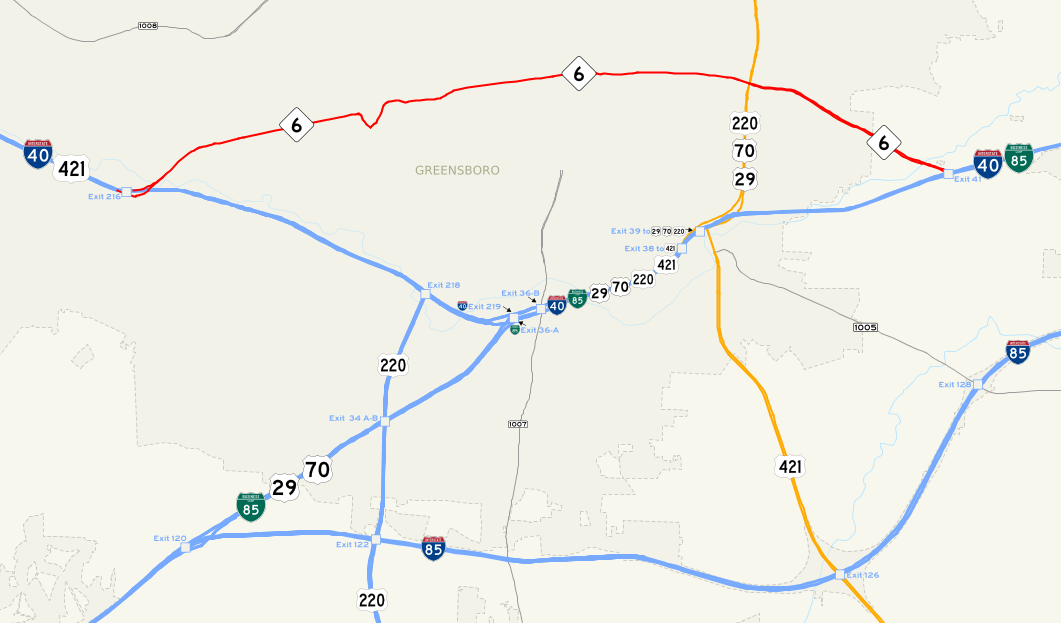

Route information
- Maintained by NCDOT
- Length: 8.5 mi (13.7 km)
- Existed: 1959–2005

Major junctions
- West end: I-40 in west Greensboro
- US 29 / US 70 / US 220 southeast of downtown Greensboro
- East end: I-40 in east Greensboro

Location
- Country: United States
- State: North Carolina
- Counties: Guilford

Highway system
- North Carolina Highway System; Interstate; US; State; Scenic
← NC 5	→ NC 7

North Carolina Highway 6 (NC 6) was an 8-mile-long (13 km) North Carolina state highway. It ran entirely in Guilford County and served primarily to connect Interstate 40 (I-40) and Business I-85 (I-85 Bus.) commuters in Greensboro. It was decommissioned in 2005.

== Route description ==
The western terminus of NC 6 was at I-40 and U.S. Route 421 (US 421) at I-40's exit 216 in West Greensboro. The interchange only allowed for eastbound I-40 / southbound US 421 traffic to enter eastbound NC 6 and vice versa. From there, NC 6 traveled east Patterson Street with a speed limit of 45 mph (72 km/h), having an interchange with Merrit Drive, then to Patterson's only traffic signal at Holden Road. It continued east to Patterson's end at the Greensboro Coliseum with a speed limit of 35 mph (56 km/h). NC 6 then turned to the northeast and followed High Point Road onto Lee Street. NC 6 intersected O'Henry Boulevard (U.S. Route 29 (US 29), US 70, and US 220). The state highway continued east bending slightly to the south before ending at I-40 and I-85 Bus. at their exit 224.

== History ==
- 1934: NC 6 is commissioned as a short road located southwest of Lake Mattamuskeet in Hyde County.
- 1944: NC 6 is decommissioned and not replaced.
- 1947: A new NC 6 cuts off the corner between NC 49 and U.S. Route 52 in Stanly County. It replaced NC 49A.
- 1953: NC 8 is extended, moving NC 6.
- 1959: After moving to its current location, a couple of timely shifts allowed NC 6 to follow its current route.
- 2000s (decade): Recent changes have slightly altered the path of NC 6 around the I-40 interchange and the Greensboro Coliseum.
- 2005: NC 6 decommissioned, signs not taken down until around May 2009.
- 2015: High Point Road and Lee Street, which was NC 6 east of Patterson Street, renamed Gate City Boulevard.

== Major intersections ==
The entire route was in Greensboro, Guilford County.

mi	km	Destinations	Notes
0.0– 0.6	0.0– 0.97	I-40	Exit 216 (I-40); eastbound I-40 exit / westbound I-40 entrance only
1.1– 1.4	1.8– 2.3	Merrit Drive	Interchange
4.4– 4.6	7.1– 7.4	Freeman Mill Road	Interchange
5.1– 5.2	8.2– 8.4	Martin Luther King Jr. Drive	Interchange; no access to eastbound NC 6
6.1– 6.4	9.8– 10.3	US 29 / US 70 / US 220 (O'Henry Boulevard)	Interchange
8.3– 8.5	13.4– 13.7	I-40 / East Lee Street – High Point, Burlington, Durham	Eastern terminus of NC 6
1.000 mi = 1.609 km; 1.000 km = 0.621 mi: Incomplete access

== See also ==
- Greensboro Bypass
- Death Valley (North Carolina)
