= Handy, North Carolina =

- Unincorporated community
- Location within North Carolina Location within the United States
- Coordinates: 35°35′19″N 80°06′03″W
- Country: United States
- State: North Carolina
- County: Davidson
- Elevation: 669 ft (204 m)
- Time zone: UTC-5 (Eastern (EST))
  - Summer (DST): UTC-4 (EDT)
- Area code: 336
- GNIS feature ID: 1020607

Handy is an unincorporated community in Davidson County, North Carolina, United States. The community is located on North Carolina Highway 109 3.2 miles (5.1 km) south of Denton.
