= North Carolina Highway 740 =

State highway in Stanly County, North Carolina, US

North Carolina Highway 740

Route information
- Maintained by NCDOT
- Length: 12.8 mi (20.6 km)
- Existed: 1930–present

Major junctions
- South end: NC 24 / NC 27 / NC 73 in Albemarle
- North end: US 52 / NC 8 in New London

Location
- Country: United States
- State: North Carolina
- Counties: Stanly

Highway system
- North Carolina Highway System; Interstate; US; State; Scenic
← NC 731	→ NC 742

North Carolina Highway 740 is a primary state highway in the U.S. state of North Carolina. The southern terminus is in Albemarle, from which it runs northeast into the town of Badin, then turns northwest to terminate in New London. The entire 12.8 miles (20.6 km) route lies within Stanly County.

== Route description ==
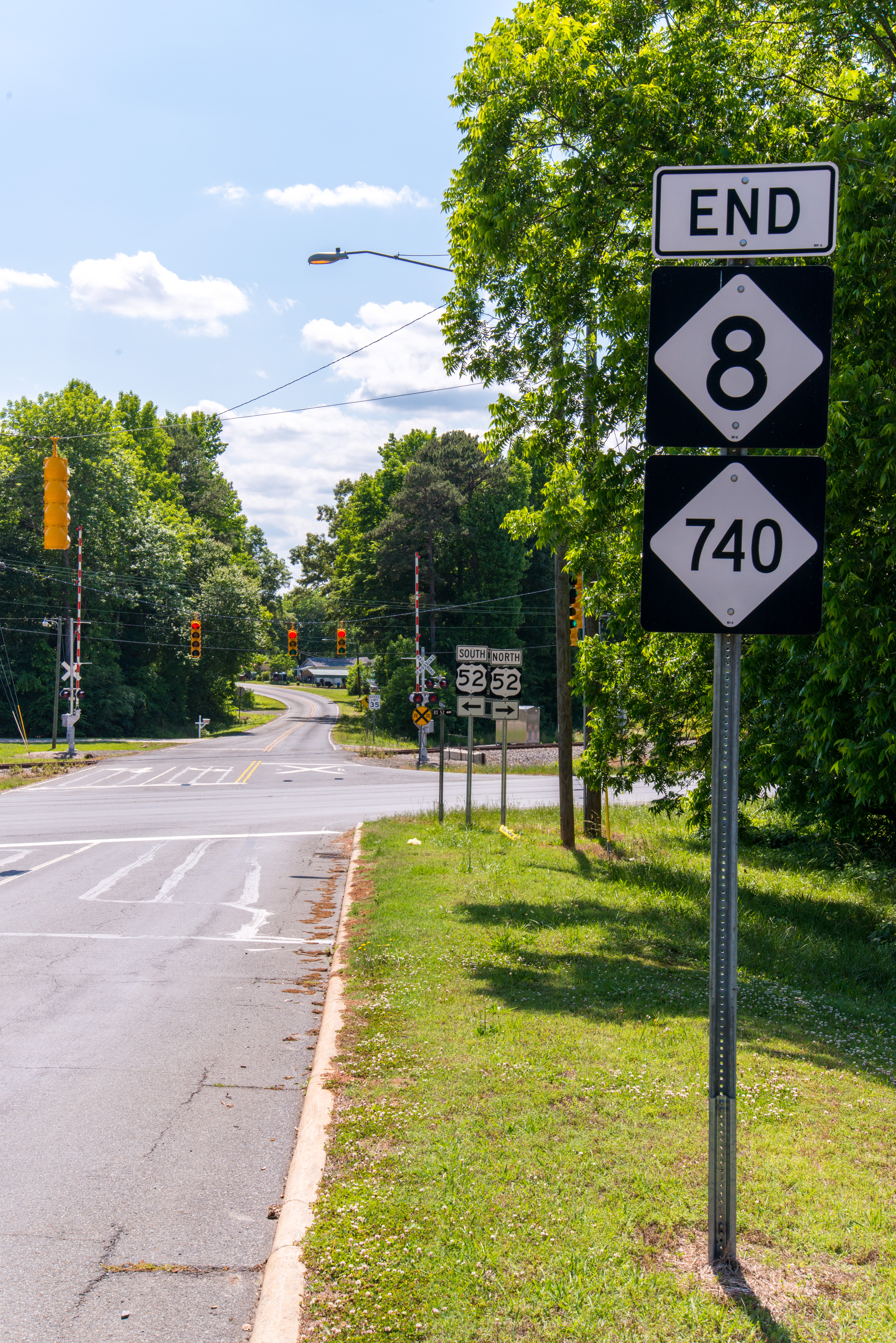
End of NC 8/NC 740 at US 52, in New London

NC 740 is a two-lane rural highway; starting in Albemarle, it goes northeast to the factory town of Badin. NC 740 through Badin is decorated with many town banners and street lights; most of the stoplights are found on the street corners rather than suspended from overhead wires. After it goes through the town, NC 740 skirts along the banks of Badin Lake before going northwest to New London, where it ends.

== History ==
Established around 1930 as a spur of NC 74 (renumbered NC 73 in 1934), it connected Albemarle to the town of Badin then back to New London, ending at NC 80 (current NC 8). In 1933, it was extended north, replacing some of NC 62; but then reverted to original terminus in 1935, replaced by NC 62A and later NC 8. In the mid-1950s, NC 740 moved south from Badin Road to a new terminus with NC 27. In the early 1980s, NC 740 was overlapped with NC 8 and extended .2 miles (0.32 km) to its current northern terminus.

== Junction list ==
The entire route is in Stanly County.

Location	mi	km	Destinations	Notes
Albemarle	0.0	0.0	NC 24 / NC 27 / NC 73 (Main Street) – Charlotte, Troy	
New London	12.6	20.3	NC 8 north (Main Street)	Southern end of overlap with NC 8
New London	12.8	20.6	US 52 – Salisbury, Albemarle	Northern end of overlap with NC 8, termini of NC 8/NC 740
1.000 mi = 1.609 km; 1.000 km = 0.621 mi: Concurrency terminus

== See also ==
- Morrow Mountain State Park
- North Carolina Bicycle Route 6 - Concurrent with NC 740 from its southern terminus to Vickers Store Road
