= Bethesda, Davidson County, North Carolina =

Bethesda, North Carolina
- Unincorporated community
- Location within the state of North Carolina
- Coordinates: 35°52′46″N 80°14′27″W
- Country: United States
- State: North Carolina
- County: Davidson
- Elevation: 827 ft (252 m)
- Time zone: UTC-5 (Eastern (EST))
  - Summer (DST): UTC-4 (EDT)
- GNIS feature ID: 1019113

Bethesda is an unincorporated community in Davidson County, North Carolina. It lies at an elevation of 827 feet (252 m).
