= Smith Reynolds Airport =

Airport in Winston-Salem, North Carolina, US

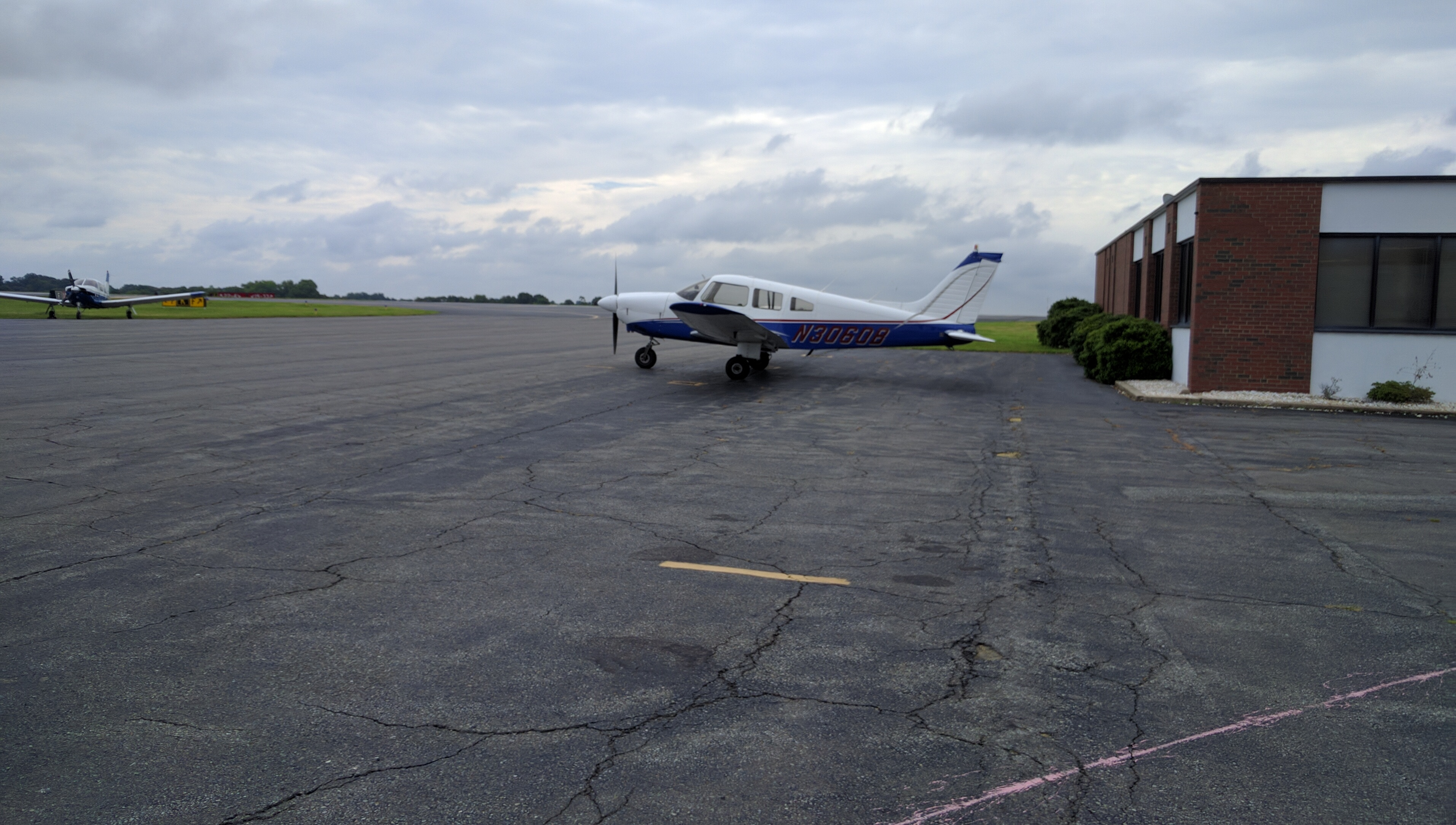
- IATA: INT; ICAO: KINT; FAA LID: INT

Summary
- Airport type: Public
- Owner: Airport Commission of Forsyth County
- Serves: Greensboro & Winston-Salem
- Location: Winston-Salem, North Carolina
- Elevation AMSL: 969 ft (295 m)
- Coordinates: 36°08′01″N 80°13′19″W

Map
- Location INT (the United States)

Runways
Direction	Length		Surface
Direction	ft	m	Surface
15/33	6,655	2,028	Asphalt
4/22	3,938	1,200	Asphalt

Smith Reynolds Airport (IATA: INT, ICAO: KINT, FAA LID: INT) is a public airport 3 miles (5 km) northeast of Winston-Salem in Forsyth County, North Carolina. The airport has two runways, and is used for general aviation and flight training. There are currently no scheduled passenger airline flights (these are handled locally by the Piedmont Triad International Airport in Greensboro). Smith Reynolds was once home to the Winston-Salem air show, usually held in September, which drew about 20,000 spectators. There has not been an airshow since 2015. The airport has multiple flight schools and maintenance facilities. Smith Reynolds also has an operational control tower that operates from 6:00 AM to 9:30 PM year-round. INT covers 702 acres (284 ha) of land.

== History ==
The question of an airmail route and an airport for Winston-Salem was decided in the 1920s when land west of Greensboro was selected over a Winston-Salem tract, and Winston-Salem withdrew from the Tri-city Airport Commission.

A portion of land off Walkertown Avenue (present-day Liberty Street) was chosen as the perfect site for an airport. Clint Miller pledged $17,000 for the development of facilities at the airfield, so when the new Airport Corporation met for the first time, they decided the airfield would be named Miller Municipal Airport. Reynolds Aviation would be the main activity at Miller Field for its first five years. There were flights to New York, Detroit, Philadelphia and Baltimore, and weekend taxi service to Wrightsville and Myrtle Beach. In 1932, when Dick Reynolds disbanded Reynolds Aviation, a group of local businessmen formed Camel City Flying Service. Camel City renovated the existing structures, strengthened field lights and installed a grandstand for aerial shows.

In 1933, the Civil Works Administration, a program developed by The New Deal, began extending each runway by 500 feet (150 m), lining the main hangar floors with concrete and relocating the field lighting system. Through the 1930s Miller Airport received many New Deal projects including a new administration building, a third runway, and a field lighting system. The airport land was expanded to 170 acres (0.69 km^{2}) and a fourth runway was added by 1938.

In 1940 President of the Airport Commission Charles Norfleet contacted Eastern Air Lines requesting them to begin servicing Miller Airport. When Eastern agreed to add Miller Airport to its north–south route network, Dick Reynolds and his sisters, all trustees of the Z. Smith Reynolds Foundation, donated funds from the Foundation to further modernize and expand the airport. In 1942, Miller Municipal Airport was renamed and dedicated to Smith Reynolds, a pioneer in aviation before his death at the age of 20.

From 1942 until 1945, Smith Reynolds Airport was a training base for military pilots in addition to its commercial and private airline services.

The airport was struck by an F2 tornado on May 5, 1989. The tornado tossed 30 aircraft and damaged hangars.

=== Piedmont Airlines ===
Piedmont Airlines (1948-1989) was based at the airport. Predecessor Camel City Flying Services had become Piedmont Aviation, Inc. in 1940 and spent the 1940s building a base in flight training and airline sales. The company grew to over 80 employees by 1947 when the federal Civil Aeronautics Board (CAB) awarded Piedmont Airlines a temporary certificate for regional air service. The company split into two divisions to continue to operate the fixed base operations (FBO) services and also operate four scheduled passenger feeder line routes extending from Wilmington, NC to Cincinnati, Ohio, serving twenty-two airports with one of three of the original DC-3s affectionately known as the Pacemakers. According to the airline's July 1, 1948 system timetable, Piedmont was operating nonstop service from the airport to both Bristol, Tennessee, and nearby Greensboro-High Point, North Carolina, as well as direct, no change of plane service to Cincinnati; Lexington, Kentucky; Raleigh-Durham; Goldsboro, North Carolina; New Bern, North Carolina; Morehead City-Beaufort, North Carolina; and Wilmington, North Carolina, with all flights on Douglas DC-3s. The route between Winston-Salem and Greensboro-High Point was the shortest commercial flight in the U.S. at sixteen miles.

By 1953, Piedmont Airlines employed over 680 people and grossed over $5.3 million on almost 3,000 miles (4,800 km) of routes. In 1966 the airline was operating Fairchild F-27 turboprops and Martin 4-0-4 prop aircraft from Smith Reynolds Airport with fifteen weekday departures, direct to Asheville; Atlanta; Baltimore; Charleston, West Virginia; Charlottesville, Virginia; Cincinnati; Fayetteville, North Carolina; Kinston, North Carolina; Knoxville; Louisville; Myrtle Beach; Newport News; Norfolk; Washington, D.C.; Wilmington and other destinations.

In 1968 Piedmont was flying Boeing 727-100 jetliners nonstop to Asheville and Roanoke and direct to Atlanta, New York La Guardia Airport and Charlottesville. Piedmont also flew Fairchild Hiller FH-227B turboprops from INT. By 1978, the airline was operating Boeing 727s and Boeing 737-200s in addition to NAMC YS-11 turboprops and had added direct jets to Chicago O'Hare Airport and nonstop jets to Washington National Airport. In 1983 all Piedmont flights from Smith Reynolds Airport were being operated with Boeing 737-200 jets with nonstops to Atlanta and Washington, D.C., and direct flights to Denver and Louisville with a total of four 737 departures a day being operated.

Piedmont had grown into one of the nation's major airlines with an all-jet mainline fleet when it was acquired by and merged into USAir in 1989. Piedmont's largest operation in later years was located at Charlotte/Douglas International Airport, a major hub for the airline, but Piedmont continued to serve Smith Reynolds Airport as well. USAir (later US Airways which has since been merged into American Airlines) closed its INT crew base in 1991. Their heavy aircraft maintenance base was closed in September 1998, leaving only specialty maintenance shops, the last of which closed in 2005. US Airways maintained its largest reservations center in Winston-Salem before merging with American.

=== Other prior airline service ===
Capital Airlines and Eastern Air Lines operated flights into Smith Reynolds Airport until 1961. The June 1, 1960 Eastern Air Lines system timetable listed nonstop flights to Washington National Airport and Charlotte as well as direct service between INT and New York La Guardia Airport, New York Newark Airport, Atlanta, Providence, Rhode Island, Richmond, Virginia, Atlantic City, New Jersey, Wilmington, North Carolina, and other destinations operated with Convair 440, Lockheed Constellation (L-1049 "Super-G" model) and Martin 4-0-4 prop aircraft. According to its June 1, 1961, system timetable, Capital Airlines was serving the airport with British-manufactured Vickers Viscount four-engine turboprops with nonstops to Asheville, North Carolina and Richmond, Virginia and direct one-stop service to Atlanta and Washington National Airport. Capital and Eastern then ceased to serve the airport and the only remaining scheduled passenger airline flights were operated by Piedmont and its successors. Nonstops operated by Piedmont may never have reached beyond Washington, D.C., and Atlanta.

By 1984, the only scheduled air carrier flights were being operated by commuter turboprops to the nearby Piedmont hub at Charlotte (CLT). In 1989, USAir Express was operating seven flights a day between the airport and Charlotte with British Aerospace BAe Jetstream 31 and Short 360 commuter turboprop aircraft. By 1999, successor US Airways Express was operating only three flights a day between the airport and Charlotte with BAe Jetstream 31 commuter propjets. US Airways Express commuter air carrier CCAir then ceased its code share service operated on behalf of US Airways to Charlotte in January 2000 and Winston-Salem has not had air carrier flights associated with a major airline since then. The airport maintains high volume and income with general aviation and private business aircraft activity.

=== Today ===
For the 2026 Men's World Cup in Mexico, Canada, and the United States, the German national team has set up its base camp in Winston-Salem. FIFA-organized charter flights for the team departed from Smith Reynolds Airport to Houston (Texas), Toronto (Canada), and New Jersey (New York).

== Current Services ==
=== FBO & Charter Service ===
Signature Flight Support Inc. is a fixed-base operator at Smith Reynolds Airport. They provide:

- 100LL Fuel
- Fuel System Icing Inhibitor (Prist)
- Jet A Line Service
- Aircraft Maintenance
- Aircraft Parking
- Airstairs
- Defueling
- Flight Planning
- GPU services
- Helicopter Handling
- International Trash Disposal
- Lavatory Service
- Nitrogen
- Tie Downs
- Overnight Hangar

=== Emergency Services ===
Forsyth County Fire Division station 9 is located on Smith Reynolds Airport. The station is located at the end of taxiway Echo. It houses a 2007 Oshkosh Striker 1500 Airport Rescue and Firefighting Vehicle. The vehicle is staffed 24/7 year round. It carries 1500 gallons of water, 210 gallons of foam concentrate, and 500 pounds of purple K dry chemical agent.

=== Maintenance Facilities ===
North State Aviation operates a maintenance facility at Smith Reynolds Airport. North State Aviation is an FAA Part 145 Repair Station with MRO capabilities for Boeing 727, 737, 757, plus the Airbus A320 family of aircraft and limited capability on 767 aircraft. The North State facility can house 6 to 10 airliners at any given time with 6 bays in its facility and additional ramp space dedicated to them.

Signature Aviation operates an FAA Part 145 repair station based at Smith Reynolds Airport. Capabilities include full aircraft maintenance services including engine overhaul and replacement, major and minor checks, full avionics installations, and Mobile Service Unit capabilities.

=== Flight Training ===
Piedmont Flight Training is a primary flight training provider located at Smith Reynolds. They operate the Cessna 172 S, Cessna 172 L/M, Piper Archer PA-28-181, Piper Seneca 1, and Pipistrel Alpha Trainer.

Lookup Flight Academy is a flight training provide located at Smith Reynolds. They operate Sling NGT aircraft.

=== Other tenants ===
Collins Aerospace has a facility at Smith Reynolds that deals with aircraft interior components and maintenance. A large portion of operation at Smith Reynolds is related to aircraft seating.

== See also ==
- List of airports in North Carolina
- North Carolina World War II Army Airfields
