= North Carolina Highway 109 =

State highway in North Carolina, US

North Carolina Highway 109

- Route of NC 109 in red

Route information
- Maintained by NCDOT
- Length: 105.9 mi (170.4 km)
- Existed: 1928–present
- Tourist routes: Grassy Island Crossing

Major junctions
- South end: SC 109 at the South Carolina line near Mount Croghan
- US 52 / US 74 / NC 742 in Wadesboro; US 64 near Thomasville; I-85 in Thomasville; US 29 / US 70 in Thomasville
- North end: I-40 in Winston-Salem

Location
- Country: United States
- State: North Carolina
- Counties: Anson, Richmond, Montgomery, Randolph, Davidson, Forsyth

Highway system
- North Carolina Highway System; Interstate; US; State; Scenic
← NC 108	→ NC 110

North Carolina Highway 109 (NC 109) is a north–south state highway in North Carolina. It primarily connects small towns in the central Piedmont region of the state. The 117-mile (188 km) route is a two-lane road for most of its length, but the segment between Winston-Salem and Thomasville is being upgraded to a divided 4-lane highway, as it is a major route between the two cities. The central segment of NC 109 passes through the Uwharrie Mountains and the Uwharrie National Forest.

== Route description ==
View south along NC 109 concurrent with NC 742 past US 52/US 74 in Wadesboro

North Carolina Highway 109 begins at the North Carolina-South Carolina border north of Ruby, South Carolina. NC 109 intersects its first road, Long Pine Church Road (SR 1220) about a mile north of the border. NC 109 continues north from there to Wadesboro. NC 109 enters Wadesboro on Camden Road. The road intersects NC 742 and runs a short concurrency with the road. In downtown Wadesboro, NC 109 intersects US 52/US 74/NC 742. NC 109 continues north from the intersection out of Wadesboro along N Greene Street. As the road goes further to the north it crosses the Pee Dee River into Richmond County.

After crossing into Richmond County, NC 109 intersects Grassy Island Road (SR 1634). The road passes through the rural area going almost directly north towards Mount Gilead. The last intersection along NC 109 in Richmond County is with Jack Currie Road, right before the road heads into Montgomery County.

NC 109 enters rural Montgomery County and continues towards the north. When the road enters Mount Gilead on Wadesboro Boulevard, it intersects NC 731 and then bypasses downtown. As NC 109 comes around the north side of Mount Gilead, it intersects NC 73 and then leaves the town. About a mile after leaving Mount Gilead the road enters the Uwharrie National Forest. NC 109 intersects NC 24/NC 27 inside the national forest. NC 109 runs a concurrency with NC 24/NC 27 until Troy. In Troy, NC 109 turns left to continue back north along N Bilhen Street. NC 109 crosses the Uwharrie River before going through Eldorado and entering Randolph County. NC 109 enters and leaves Randolph County within a half a mile and then enters Davidson County.

== History ==
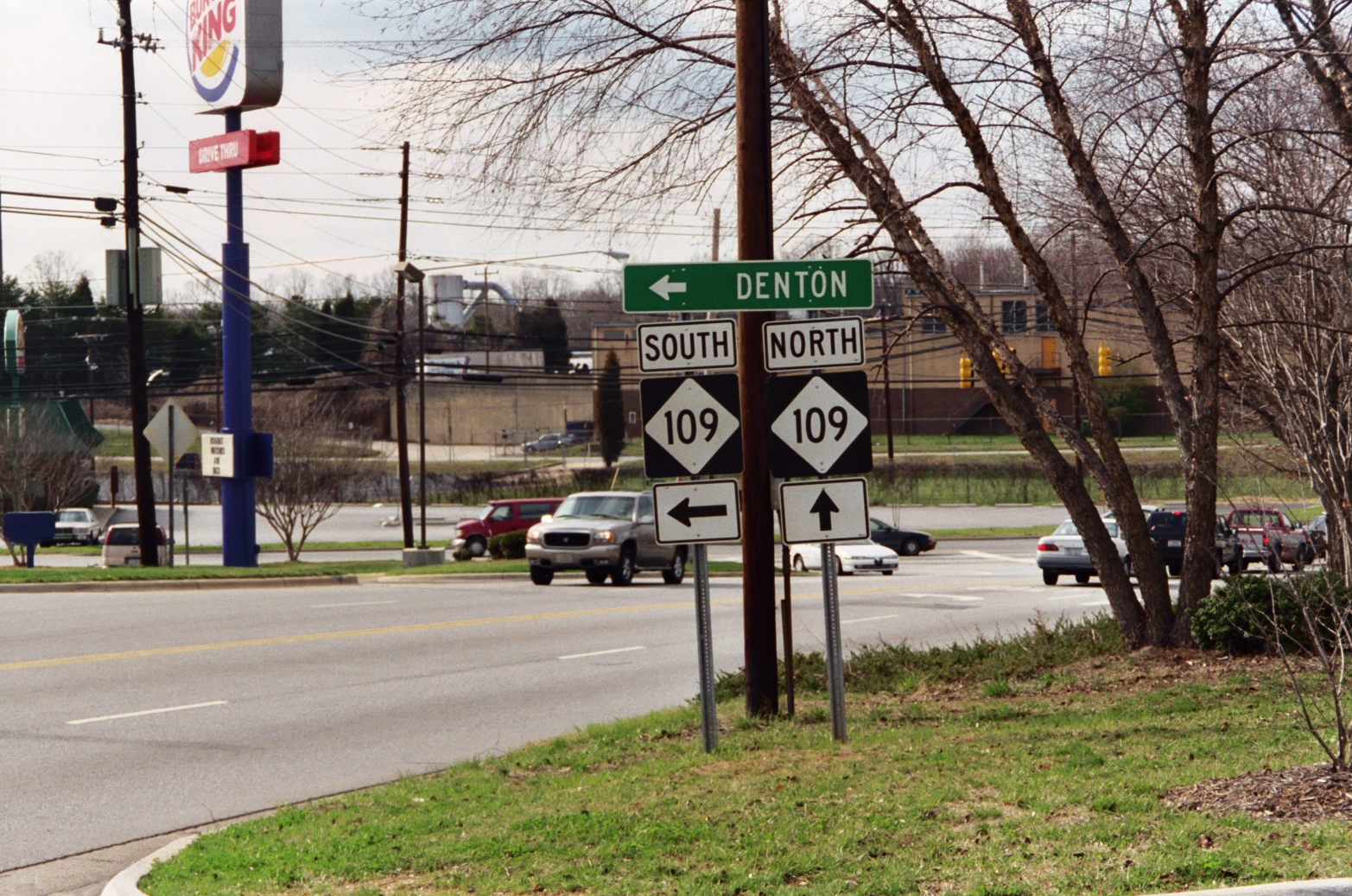
NC 109 directional signs at the NC 62 western terminus in Thomasville

=== North Carolina Highway 515 ===
North Carolina Highway 515
- Location: SC state line–Mount Gilead, NC
- Length: 41.1 mi (66.1 km)
- Existed: 1923–1934

North Carolina Highway 515 (NC 515) was established as a new primary routing from NC 51, in Mount Gilead, to NC 74, three miles (4.8 km) to the northwest. In 1928, NC 515 was extended south to US 74/NC 20 in Wadesboro. The road was extended to its final southern terminus at the South Carolina state line. In 1934, most of NC 515 was renumbered to NC 109. The only part that was not renumbered to NC 109 was the segment from NC 74 to NC 51; which became part of NC 73.

== Future ==
NCDOT conducted a project study to improve the safety of NC 109 between Thomasville and Winston-Salem in 2012. Various improvements were identified, including the use of the Superstreet concept.

== Major intersections ==
County	Location	mi	km	Destinations	Notes
Anson		0.0	0.0	SC 109 south (Camden Road) – Mount Croghan	Continuation beyond South Carolina state line
Anson	Wadesboro	13.1	21.1	NC 742 south (Chesterfield Road) – Chesterfield, SC	South end of NC 742 concurrency
Anson	Wadesboro	13.9	22.4	US 52 / US 74 / NC 742 north (Caswell Street) – Morven, Lilesville, Polkton, Ansonville	North end of NC 742 concurrency
Richmond	No major junctions				
Montgomery	Mount Gilead	33.0	53.1	NC 731 north (Allenton Road) – Norwood, Candor	
Montgomery	Mount Gilead	33.4	53.8	NC 73 south (Main Street) – Albemarle, Ellerbe	
Montgomery		41.5	66.8	NC 24 west / NC 27 west – Albemarle, Charlotte	South end of NC 24/NC 27 concurrency
Montgomery	Troy	45.0	72.4	NC 24 east / NC 27 east (Albemarle Road) – Biscoe, Carthage	North end of NC 24/NC 27 concurrency
Randolph	No major junctions				
Davidson	Handy	64.3	103.5	NC 49 – Concord, Asheboro	Diamond interchange
Davidson	Denton	69.5	111.8	NC 47 east (Bombay Road)	South end of NC 47 concurrency
Davidson	Denton	69.7	112.2	NC 47 west (Salisbury Street) – Linwood, Lexington	North end of NC 47 concurrency
Davidson	Gordontown	79.4	127.8	US 64 – Lexington, Asheboro	Diamond interchange
Davidson	Thomasville	85.9	138.2	I-85 – Charlotte, Greensboro	Diamond interchange; exit 103 on I-85
Davidson	Thomasville	86.3	138.9	NC 62 east (Cloniger Drive) – Archdale, Climax	Western terminus of NC 62
Davidson	Thomasville	89.0	143.2	US 29 / US 70 – Lexington, Salisbury, Greensboro	
Forsyth	Winston-Salem	103.0	165.8	I-40 – Statesville, Greensboro, High Point	Diamond interchange; exit 195 on I-40
1.000 mi = 1.609 km; 1.000 km = 0.621 mi: Concurrency terminus

== Special routes ==
=== Mount Gilead business loop ===
North Carolina Highway 109 Business
- Location: Mount Gilead, North Carolina
- Length: 0.5 mi (800 m)
- Existed: 1968–present

North Carolina Highway 109 Business (NC 109 Bus) was established between 1963 and 1968 as a renumbering of NC 109, via Allenton Street (overlapped with NC 731) and Main Street (overlapped with NC 73). Its designation is hidden or unmarked as it only appears in state and county maps.

=== Troy alternate route ===
North Carolina Highway 109A
- Location: Troy, North Carolina
- Length: 1.5 mi (2.4 km)
- Existed: 1953–1960

North Carolina Highway 109 Alternate (NC 109A) was established around 1950-1953 as a renumbering of mainline NC 109, which was placed on a new bypass alignment west of Troy. The route traverses on Albemarle Road, West Main Street, North Main Street, Smitherman Street and Eldorado Street.

=== Troy business loop ===
North Carolina Highway 109 Business
- Location: Troy, North Carolina
- Length: 1.5 mi (2.4 km)
- Existed: 1960–2024

North Carolina Highway 109 Business (NC 109 Bus) was established in 1960 as a rebannering of NC 109A through downtown Troy. On November 1, 2024, NCDOT certified the decommissioning of the business route, with Smitherman and Eldorado streets downgraded to secondary road (SR 1412).

=== Thomasville alternate route ===
North Carolina Highway 109A
- Location: Thomasville, North Carolina
- Length: 3.2 mi (5.1 km)
- Existed: 1936–1960

North Carolina Highway 109 Alternate (NC 109A) was established in 1936 as a new alternate routing of NC 109 along Fisher Ferry Road and Main Street.

=== Thomasville business loop ===
North Carolina Highway 109 Business
- Location: Thomasville, North Carolina
- Length: 3.2 mi (5.1 km)
- Existed: 1960–1971

North Carolina Highway 109 Business (NC 109 Bus) was established in 1960 as a rebannering of mainline NC 109A. In 1971, mainline NC 109 was aligned on new road further east; its old alignment along Denton Road was downgraded to secondary road, thus NC 109 Bus was decommissioned as a result.
