= Richfield, North Carolina =

- Town
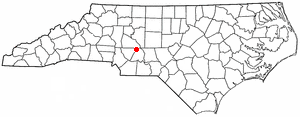
- Location of Richfield, North Carolina
- Coordinates: 35°28′18″N 80°15′31″W
- Country: United States
- State: North Carolina
- County: Stanly

Government
  - Mayor: Terry Deese

Area
  - Total: 2.44 sq mi (6.32 km^{2})
  - Land: 2.42 sq mi (6.27 km^{2})
  - Water: 0.019 sq mi (0.05 km^{2})
- Elevation: 640 ft (200 m)

Population (2020)
  - Total: 582
  - Density: 240.3/sq mi (92.77/km^{2})
- Time zone: UTC-5 (Eastern (EST))
  - Summer (DST): UTC-4 (EDT)
- ZIP code: 28137
- Area code: 704
- FIPS code: 37-56340
- GNIS feature ID: 2407207
- Website: https://richfieldnc.gov/

Richfield is a town in Stanly County, North Carolina, United States. As of the 2020 census, Richfield had a population of 582. The town was originally called "Ritchie's Field," for the prominent Ritchie family who established the post office, sawmill, and streets of the settlement.

== Geography ==
According to the United States Census Bureau, the town has a total area of 2.1 square miles (5.4 km^{2}), of which 2.1 square miles (5.4 km^{2}) is land and 0.04 square miles (0.10 km^{2}) (0.95%) is water.

Richfield is located at the junction of US Route 52 and State Highway 49.

== Demographics ==
Historical population
Census	Pop.	Note	%±
1900	73		—
1910	210		187.7%
1920	177		−15.7%
1930	221		24.9%
1940	266		20.4%
1950	237		−10.9%
1960	293		23.6%
1970	306		4.4%
1980	373		21.9%
1990	535		43.4%
2000	515		−3.7%
2010	613		19.0%
2020	582		−5.1%
U.S. Decennial Census

=== 2020 census ===
Richfield racial composition
Race	Number	Percentage
White (non-Hispanic)	511	87.8%
Black or African American (non-Hispanic)	30	5.15%
Native American	2	0.34%
Asian	12	2.06%
Other/Mixed	15	2.58%
Hispanic or Latino	12	2.06%

As of the 2020 United States census, there were 582 people, 196 households, and 148 families residing in the town.

=== 2000 census ===
At the 2000 census, there were 515 people, 197 households and 144 families residing in the town. The population density was 247.0 inhabitants per square mile (95.4/km^{2}). There were 225 housing units at an average density of 107.9 per square mile (41.7/km^{2}). The racial makeup of the town was 81.94% White, 14.37% African American, 2.14% Asian, 0.19% Pacific Islander, and 1.36% from two or more races. Hispanic or Latino of any race were 0.19% of the population.

There were 197 households, of which 34.0% had children under the age of 18 living with them, 56.9% were married couples living together, 12.2% had a female householder with no husband present, and 26.9% were non-families. 23.9% of all households were made up of individuals, and 9.1% had someone living alone who was 65 years of age or older. The average household size was 2.61 and the average family size was 3.13.

27.4% of the population were under the age of 18, 6.4% from 18 to 24, 29.7% from 25 to 44, 25.6% from 45 to 64, and 10.9% who were 65 years of age or older. The median age was 36 years. For every 100 females, there were 100.4 males. For every 100 females age 18 and over, there were 102.2 males.

The median household income was $40,083 and the family median income was $41,442. Males had a median income of $26,420 compared with $23,542 for females. The per capita income for the town was $15,334. About 4.7% of families and 5.7% of the population were below the poverty line, including 4.4% of those under age 18 and 12.1% of those age 65 or over.

== Government ==
Richfield is governed by a mayor and town council system. Floyd Wilson was re-elected mayor on November 5, 2013, replacing Jim Misenheimer, long time mayor pro-tem Terry Deese became mayor June 2016 with the passing of Floyd Wilson. Former mayors include Terry Almond and Wade Barbee.
