= Interstate 40 Business (North Carolina) =

Interstate 40 Business (I-40 Bus.) in North Carolina may refer to:

- Interstate 40 Business (Winston-Salem, North Carolina)
- Interstate 40 Business (Raleigh, North Carolina)
- Interstate 40 Business (Greensboro, North Carolina)
