= Winston-Salem Northern Beltway =

Highway in North Carolina

Winston-Salem Northern Beltway
- I-74 in red; Future NC 452 (Future I-274) in purple

Route information
- Maintained by NCDOT
- Length: 12.5 mi (20.1 km)
- Existed: 2020–present
- Component highways: NC 452 (Clemmons–Rural Hall); I-74 (Rural Hall–Union Cross)

Major junctions
- West end: US 52 near Rural Hall
- NC 66 near Rural Hall; US 311 in Walkertown; US 158 in Walkertown; US 421 / NC 150 in Kernersville; I-40 in Winston-Salem
- East end: NC 192 in Union Cross

Location
- Country: United States
- State: North Carolina
- Counties: Forsyth

Highway system
- North Carolina Highway System; Interstate; US; State; Scenic

The Winston-Salem Northern Beltway is a partially completed freeway loop around the city of Winston-Salem in North Carolina. The western section has been designated as North Carolina Highway 452 (NC 452), which will become I-274 when completed, and the eastern section of the beltway is designated as I-74. The entire route is in Forsyth County.

The beltway would make Winston-Salem the seventh city in North Carolina to have a full or partial Interstate loop; the other six are Asheville (I-240), Charlotte (I-485 and I-277), Raleigh (I-440 and I-540), Wilmington (I-140), Greensboro (I-840), and Fayetteville (I-295).

== Route description ==
When completed as planned, the beltway will be approximately 30 miles (48 km) in length, beginning in the east at I-74/NC 192 and ending in the west at U.S. Highway 158 (US 158). It would be entirely within Forsyth County and would cross I-40 and US 421 twice. The beltway would serve as a freeway connector for Walkertown, Stanleyville, Rural Hall, Tobaccoville, Pfafftown, Lewisville, Kernersville, Clemmons and would serve as a possible bypass for US 158 and US 52. The TIP Project Number is R-2247 for the western segment and U-2579 for the under construction eastern segment.

The open eastern section is part of I-74. Starting at the current western terminus at US 52 in the southern outskirts of Rural Hall, the route travels southeast, with the nearby interchange with NC 66 (Exit 42) giving direct access to central Rural Hall. NC 74 travels in the eastern outskirts of Winston-Salem with NC 8 (Germanton Road) (Exit 43) and Baux Mountain Road (Exit 45). Access to the center of Walkertown is accessible from US 311 (New Walkertown Road) (Exit 49), and US 158 (Reidsville Road) (exit 50). Turning gently in the southern direction, the beltway exits the Walkertown limits, and reaches the interchange with US 421 (Salem Parkway) (Exit 53), which gives access to both Downtown Kernersville and Downtown Winston-Salem. The beltway continues southward in the western outskirts of Kernersville, coming to Kernersville Road (exit 55), which also gives access to the center of the namesake town. The beltway then comes to the exit with I-40, which leads to Greensboro, Statesville, and also to Winston-Salem. I-74 then continues south and merges onto the previously existing I-74 stretch, continuing to High Point.

== History ==
Construction of the western segment of the beltway was to begin in 1999 but was delayed by a lawsuit aimed at the environmental impact statement (EIS). After the legal situation was resolved, the North Carolina Department of Transportation (NCDOT) then announced construction would begin in 2006; however, in March 2005, the department postponed the start date again until at least 2012 due to budget shortfalls. Funds once allocated to the western segment were then reapportioned to the construction of the eastern segment, which had a planned construction start date in 2011.

A second lawsuit, however, delayed the road further. A federal district judge in May 2010 dismissed the cases accusing an updated environmental study of ignoring global warming and impact on other intersecting roads. However, the high cost of building the entire project pushed the beltway to last place on a list of urban loop projects being built by the state. In March 2011, state officials agreed to rank projects using sections, which might help the eastern section move higher on a list by 2014.

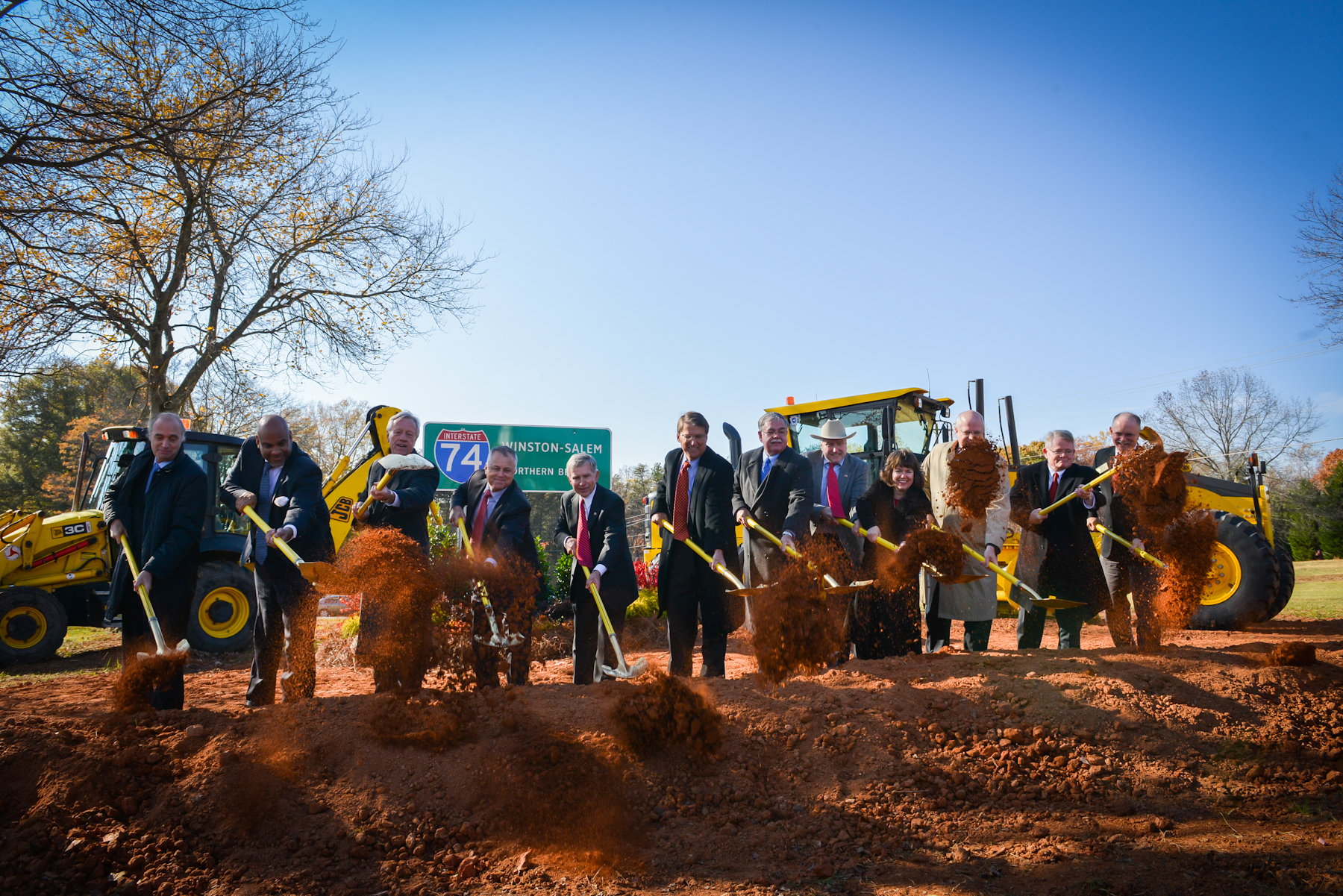
Winston-Salem Northern Beltway groundbreaking on November 14, 2014

On September 7, 2011, North Carolina Governor Bev Perdue announced that construction of a part of the eastern leg of the beltway would begin in 2014. The section to be built connects US 158 to I-40 Business (I-40 Bus.; now US 421/Salem Parkway). Right-of-way acquisition began in 2012 and cost $34 million (equivalent to $47.1 million in 2025); construction was estimated to cost $156 million. Construction on the segment, Project U-2579B, commenced in December 2014, with an anticipated completion date of November 2018. However, after delays, including an opening date of late 2019, it was finally opened to traffic on September 5, 2020.

Since then, funding has been allocated to complete the remaining sections of NC 74 between US 52 and the current I-74 (formerly cosigned with US 311), starting with the segment between US 311 and US 158, known as Project U-2579C, in October 2017. Construction on this segment began in 2018, was scheduled to open in 2021, and opened to traffic on December 23, 2020.

That same year, a contract for the segment between NC 66 and US 311, Projects U-2579D, U-2579E, and U-2579F, was awarded. Construction on this segment begun in April 2019, and it opened to traffic on November 7, 2022. Next, construction on the segments between I-74 and I-40 Bus. (now US 421/Salem Parkway), Projects U-2579AA and U-2579AB are under construction, with the Eastern Loop expected to open in 2026. During the time, construction on the interchange with US 52, which began in 2019, was scheduled to be completed in 2022, but was then delayed to mid-2023. It was later delayed again, this time to around Thanksgiving 2023.

On January 22, 2022, another contract was awarded. This section runs from the Salem Parkway to I-40, a length of 3.1 miles (5.0 km). The last section of the eastern leg (I-40 to the existing I-74) was scheduled to begin in October 2022. Both of these projects apparently had to be postponed due to the cash crunch caused by the COVID-19 pandemic.

The first phase of the project to be constructed was the northeastern quadrant, starting at US 421 (Salem Parkway) and extending north and west. It was completed in four segments. The first segment, from US 421 to US 158, was completed on September 5, 2020. The second segment, extending the route to US 311, was opened on December 23, 2020. The third segment, to NC 66, was completed on November 7, 2022. The southbound exit and northbound entrance from US 52 on the fourth segment was scheduled to open to traffic on November 18, 2023; the rest of the interchange remains under construction. On January 14, 2025, NCDOT extended NC 74 onto the segment between NC 66 (University Parkway) and US 52. On September 19, 2026, the final segment of the eastern segment of the beltway, between US 421 to the previously existing I-74 stretch opened to traffic.

== Future ==
A "Southern Beltway" connecting the eastern and western segments in Forsyth County and northern Davidson County is in the initial planning stages, as its general proposed routing had been in appearance in certain Winston-Salem Department of Transportation (WSDOT) long-range planning maps. As of January 2007, no preferred alternatives for this southern section have been officially submitted, and NCDOT does not include the Southern Beltway on its vision maps. The WSDOT plans for this final section of the beltway to start construction sometime after 2030. If completed as planned, the Southern Beltway would serve as a connector for the communities of Midway, Wallburg, and Arcadia. The southern section would have an approximate length of 15 miles (24 km) and would intersect I-285/US 52/NC 8 near its midway point. The southern loop would run parallel with I-40, in which, I-40 is considered to be the current southern "stretch" of the beltway, until the actually southern stretch is considered.

== Exit list ==
The entire route is in Forsyth County.

Location	mi	km	Exit	Destinations	Notes
Clemmons				US 158 (Stratford Road)	Western section of Winston-Salem Northern Beltway (funded)
Winston-Salem				I-40	Western section of Winston-Salem Northern Beltway (funded)
Winston-Salem				US 421 / Peace Haven Road	Western section of Winston-Salem Northern Beltway (funded)
Winston-Salem				Shallowford Road	Western section of Winston-Salem Northern Beltway (funded)
Winston-Salem				Robinhood Road	Western section of Winston-Salem Northern Beltway (funded)
Winston-Salem				Yadkinville Road	Western section of Winston-Salem Northern Beltway (funded)
Bethania				NC 67 (Reynolda Road)	Western section of Winston-Salem Northern Beltway (funded)
Bethania				Doral Drive/Bethania–Tobaccoville Road	Western section of Winston-Salem Northern Beltway (funded)
Winston-Salem			41 A-B	US 52 to NC 65 – Winston-Salem, Rural Hall	Southbound exit and northbound entrance from US 52 opened to traffic on November 19, 2023; rest of the interchange currently under construction
Stanleyville			42	NC 66 (University Parkway)	Opened to traffic on November 7, 2022
Winston-Salem			43	NC 8 (Germanton Road)	Opened to traffic on November 7, 2022
Winston-Salem			45	Baux Mountain Road	Opened to traffic on November 7, 2022
Walkertown			49	US 311 (New Walkertown Road)	Opened to traffic on December 23, 2020
Walkertown			50	US 158 (Reidsville Road)	Opened to traffic on September 5, 2020
Kernersville			53	US 421 / NC 150 (Salem Parkway) – Kernersville, Winston-Salem	Opened to traffic on September 5, 2020
Kernersville			55	Kernersville Road	Opened on September 19, 2026
Winston-Salem			56	I-40 – Greensboro, Statesville	Opened on September 19, 2026; signed as exit 56A (I-40 east) and exit 56B (I-40 west) westbound
Union Cross			58	NC 192 west TO Ridgewood Road	Opened on September 19, 2026
Union Cross			—	I-74 east – High Point	Eastern terminus
1.000 mi = 1.609 km; 1.000 km = 0.621 mi: Unopened

== Interstate 274 ==
Future Interstate 274
- Location: Winston-Salem
- Length: 16.83 mi (27.09 km)

Interstate 274 (I-274) is the future designation for the western half of the beltway, currently designated as NC 452. When completed, it will connect US 158, near Clemmons, to Future I-74/Future I-285/US 52, in Bethania. I-274 first appeared on NCDOT planning maps in the early 2000s but was later disused for over a decade since. On May 20, 2019, the American Association of State Highway and Transportation Officials (AASHTO) approved a request to establish Future I-274. Justification given by NCDOT was that the 16.83-mile (27.09 km) section would satisfy a great need to alleviate congestion in Winston-Salem and connect the western portion of the urbanized area.

== See also ==
- Greensboro Urban Loop
