= North Carolina Highway 192 =

State highway in Forsyth County, North Carolina, US

North Carolina Highway 192
- NC 192 shown in red Possible extension shown in blue

Route information
- Maintained by NCDOT
- Length: 2.6 mi (4.2 km)
- Existed: 2026–present

Major junctions
- West end: I-40 in Winston-Salem
- East end: I-74 in Union Cross

Location
- Country: United States
- State: North Carolina
- Counties: Forsyth

Highway system
- North Carolina Highway System; Interstate; US; State; Scenic
← NC 191	→ NC 194

North Carolina Highway 192 (NC 192) is an east–west primary state highway in the U.S. state of North Carolina. It serves as the designation of an existing 2.6-mile (4.2 km) segment of freeway that was previously designated as I-74 and U.S. Route 311 (US 311). The stretch spans between Interstate 40 (I-40) in Winston-Salem and the Winston-Salem Northern Beltway in Union Cross. Signage for NC 192 was uncovered in early 2026, alongside I-74 signage along the open segment of the Winston-Salem Northern Beltway. The final section of the Winston-Salem Northern Beltway opened on September 19, 2026, at which point I-74 was rerouted completely onto the new beltway.

== Route description ==
NC 192 interchange with I-74 under construction in May 2026

The state highway begins at the trumpet interchange with I-40 in Winston-Salem and runs east for 2.6 miles (4.2 km) along the four-lane freeway. The route comes to a folded-diamond with Ridgewood Road, which in-turn, connects to Union Cross Road and High Point Road. NC 192 continues southeast into Union Cross, at a multi-level interchange with the Winston-Salem Northern Beltway (I-74).

== History ==
The freeway that became NC 192 opened in 1984 as a realignment of US 311. It was designated I-74 in 2012, with signs being updated in 2014, despite the shoulders of the route lacking the standard width of Interstate Highway standards.

US 311 was removed from the road in 2019 after approval from AASHTO the previous year, with I-74 becoming the sole designation of the freeway. With the completion of the eastern section of the Winston-Salem Northern Beltway, I-74 was rerouted onto that road. As a result, the NC 192 designation was created on the former section of I-74 between I-40 and the new freeway.The currently-designated stretch of NC 192 is designed to connect Ridgewood Road with I-74 eastward and I-40 westward, in which Ridgewood Road connects to nearby Union Cross Road and High Point Road. Regional traffic is "generally" encouraged to utilize the junction of I-40 and I-74, while the junction with NC 192 is designed to connect traffic with the parallel alternative routes, which are the western stretch of Union Cross Road, alongside the historically-established corridor of High Point Road.

Signage for NC 192 began being uncovered by NCDOT in February and March 2026, alongside I-74 signage along the Winston-Salem Northern Beltway.

== Future ==
A project has been proposed since at least 1991 by NCDOT and the city of Winston-Salem to construct a four-lane, limited-access corridor from the current western terminus of NC 192 at I-40 to US 421 (Salem Parkway) at US 158 (Reidsville Road) Exit 230. This corridor would feature a landscaped median and a parallel bicycle and pedestrian trail. The project has been called the US 311 Connector or the I-74 Connector, and would have continued along the US 158 corridor of Reidsville Road. While it appears on planning maps on the Winston-Salem 2040 Metro Transportation Plan, it is not listed in the plan and no longer appears in the NCDOT State Transportation Improvement Program (STIP). Originally intended as an extension of the US 311 freeway, the connector would serve as an extension of NC 192 in a mostly north-south orientation, though official plans have not mentioned its designation since the truncation of US 311 to the Winston-Salem Northern Beltway (I-74) in Walkertown, northeast of Winston-Salem.

== Exit list ==
The entire route is in Forsyth County.

Location	mi	km	Exit	Destinations	Notes
Winston-Salem	0.0	0.0	—	I-40 west – Winston-Salem, Statesville	Western terminus
Winston-Salem	0.0	0.0	1	I-40 east – Greensboro	
Winston-Salem	1.5	2.4	2	Ridgewood Road	
Union Cross	2.6	4.2	3	I-74 west – Wytheville	
Union Cross	2.6	4.2	—	I-74 east – High Point	Eastern terminus
1.000 mi = 1.609 km; 1.000 km = 0.621 mi
