= Kernersville Loop Road =

Proposed road in North Carolina, United States

The Kernersville Loop is a partially constructed loop road around the downtown area of Kernersville, North Carolina, east of Winston-Salem, North Carolina. The loop will comprise a combination of expressways, boulevards, and local streets, with several stretches of the loop being completed or under construction as of December 2025.

== Route layout ==
When completed, the loop will begin at a future partial cloverleaf interchange with Salem Parkway (US 421) in the western edges of the town limits and will continue southeast along the existing Whicker Road and Shields Road, which are proposed to be updated into "commercialized" corridors and would supplemented by newly constructed segments. This is the south section of the loop, which would be the boulevard section. Southeast of the currently expanded Downtown area, the loop will then follow Macy Grove Road northwards through the eastern part of the town before becoming a four-lane expressway carrying NC 150, with the exit with Salem Parkway (US 421) and one-quadrant interchange with Mountain Street. Continuing on the four lane corridor, NC 150 leaves the loop northeast of central Kernersville with the at-grade intersection with North Main Street. The loop continues along a two-lane boulevard stretch of Macy Grove Road, and onto Piney Grove Road, before proceeding along Linville Springs Road. This occurs before feeding into Dobson Street. Linville Springs Road is near Old Valley School Road, which feeds into Walkertown. West of Linville Springs Road, the loop will follow the newly funded construction segment, which will connect with NC 66 (Old Hollow Road), in which NC 66 which currently transitions into Mountain Street directly south of the future intersection. The route will then turn onto Hopkins Road, continue along Big Mill Farm Road, and terminate at the designated endpoint of the loop.

== History ==
During the fourth quarter of the 20th century, Kernersville experienced the completion of major urban development initiatives begun in the previous decades. In 1955, the "US 421 Bypass," a four-lane expressway, had opened. This connected to then-western Kernersville (present day Linville Road exit in East Winston-Salem to then-southeast of downtown Kernersville (present day eastern Downtown Kernersville). This was designated as mainline US 421, replacing the designation alongside Mountain Street. The expressway became fully grade-separated along the Interstate 40 corridor in the late 1950s and early 1960s. In 1979, the "Kernersville Boulevard" was first proposed, involving upgrades to existing local roads, and the construction of new sections. I-40 was given its rerouted stretch in 1992, which eventually triggered geographical shifts to the town during the next sets of decades, which were "nonexistent" during the initial phases of the Kernersville Loop. Between 2013 and 2020, Macy Grove Road was widened to a four-lane expressway spanning from Salem Parkway (US 421) to Main Street, with NC 150 rerouted onto it. During this period, the North Carolina Department of Transportation (NCDOT) and the Town of Kernersville began acquiring right-of-way for additional sections which are planned for future construction.

== Current construction and "significance" ==
Construction is currently underway on the interchange connecting Big Mill Farm Road and Salem Parkway. The Macy Grove Road expressway is being extended to Piney Grove Road, with completion planned for mid-2026. Beyond the known and "inner purposes" of the loop, the southern section will connect the gradually-annexed southern areas of Kernersville (which also surrounds Union Cross Road) with the already-annexed northern areas of Kernersville (which also surrounds South Main Street), ushering into retail. The east and likely, north sections, will be of expressway standards, in the less developed areas of the town. Salem Parkway (US 421) is designed to "cut through" inside the loop, to directly serve the area of Downtown Kernersville. The Macy Grove Road (NC 150) interchange with Mountain Street is a one-quadrant interchange, with a separate "fork designed" lane on North NC 150 to lead to Mountain Street. The lane leading to Mountain Street from South NC 150 is closer to the "main roadway" but is designed to be long and manage flowing traffic. The Macy Grove Road diamond interchange with Salem Parkway nearby, also features spaced forks to lead traffic to exit onto Salem Parkway.

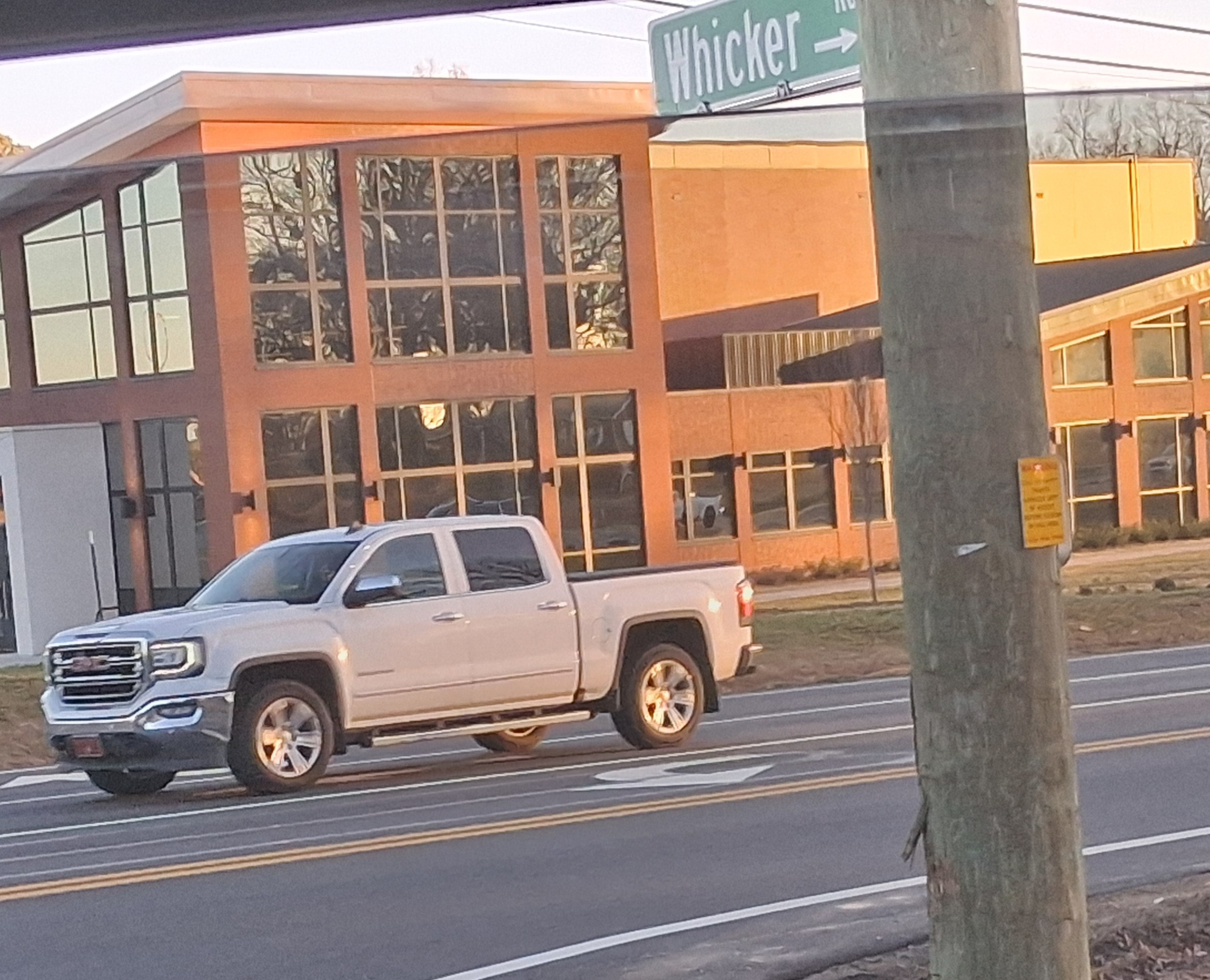
Whicker Road is slated to become a segment of the southern stretch of the Kernersville Loop, which would also connect the central areas of the town with the "regional connection" of Interstate 40 and Interstate 74, while Salem Parkway (US 421) would be designated as "more" of a connector to the Center of Downtown Winston-Salem.

The nearby "Winston-Salem Northern Beltway" (I-74) will feature its eastern section of the beltway to enter inside the western outskirts of the Kernersville town limits and usher into the "new layout": the Salem Parkway exit with the Beltway would lead into directly Downtown and Central Kernersville, while the exit with I-40 will lead to the developed southern areas of the town, directly bypassing the central Downtown area. This will also further allow the developing Forsyth County to be further accessible in broader areas. Until the proposed work of the south stretch of the Kernersville Loop is completed; the stack interchange with I-74 and I-40 (exit 198) would be the consideration to connect the areas west along the I-40 corridor west of the town to access the northern and central areas of Kernersville, which will also possibly allow the southern areas of the town to further be annexed and develop. This will replace the sole western entry from I-40 (Exit 188), which prompts drivers to traverse the center of Downtown Winston-Salem before entering into Kernersville. The beltway junction will connect the southwestern and southeastern areas of Forsyth County, in which the two areas are growing. The south stretch of the Kernersville Loop, will also allow drivers Interstate 40 access from the areas east of the town, to access Exit 206 (Salem Pkwy and US 421 North) and continuing onto Salem Pkwy before exiting at Exit 221 (Macy Grove Road); to access the southern areas of the town. This layout will allow drivers who are accessing Winston-Salem, to drive on I-40 west and either exit off at I-74 (Exit 198) to access the center of downtown, or use I-40, west of the stack interchange, to access the surrounding areas of Winston-Salem. This will also connect the southern areas of Kernersville with Salem Parkway. (Note: Listed from here on source of Southern Forsyth County growth.) The Exit 198 "configuration" will replace Exit 206, in accessing Downtown Winston-Salem from the west; in which Exit 206 is also located in Guilford County, while Exit 198 is located in Forsyth County. The southern stretch of the Kernersville Loop, will also allow Central and Northern Kernersville, broader access to I-40 and I-74, "shifting" broader access away "from" solely Salem Pkwy.

The stature of Southern Forsyth County (which includes Kernersville Loop Road and the I-74/I-40 junction), includes economic considerations, shifted geography, and the likes, to connect to the "existing" hubs of Raleigh and Charlotte, the "developing" hub of Greensboro, and broader cross-regional access.

== Junction list ==
Macy Grove Road current exit. The entire route is in Kernersville, Forsyth County.

mi	km	Destinations	Notes
		US 421 (Salem Parkway) / NC 150 west – Winston-Salem, Greensboro	
		Mountain Street	One-quadrant interchange
		NC 150 east (North Main Street)	East end of NC 150; At-grade intersection
1.000 mi = 1.609 km; 1.000 km = 0.621 mi

== See also ==
- North Carolina Highway 150
- Winston-Salem Northern Beltway
- Salem Parkway
