= W. L. Crouse =

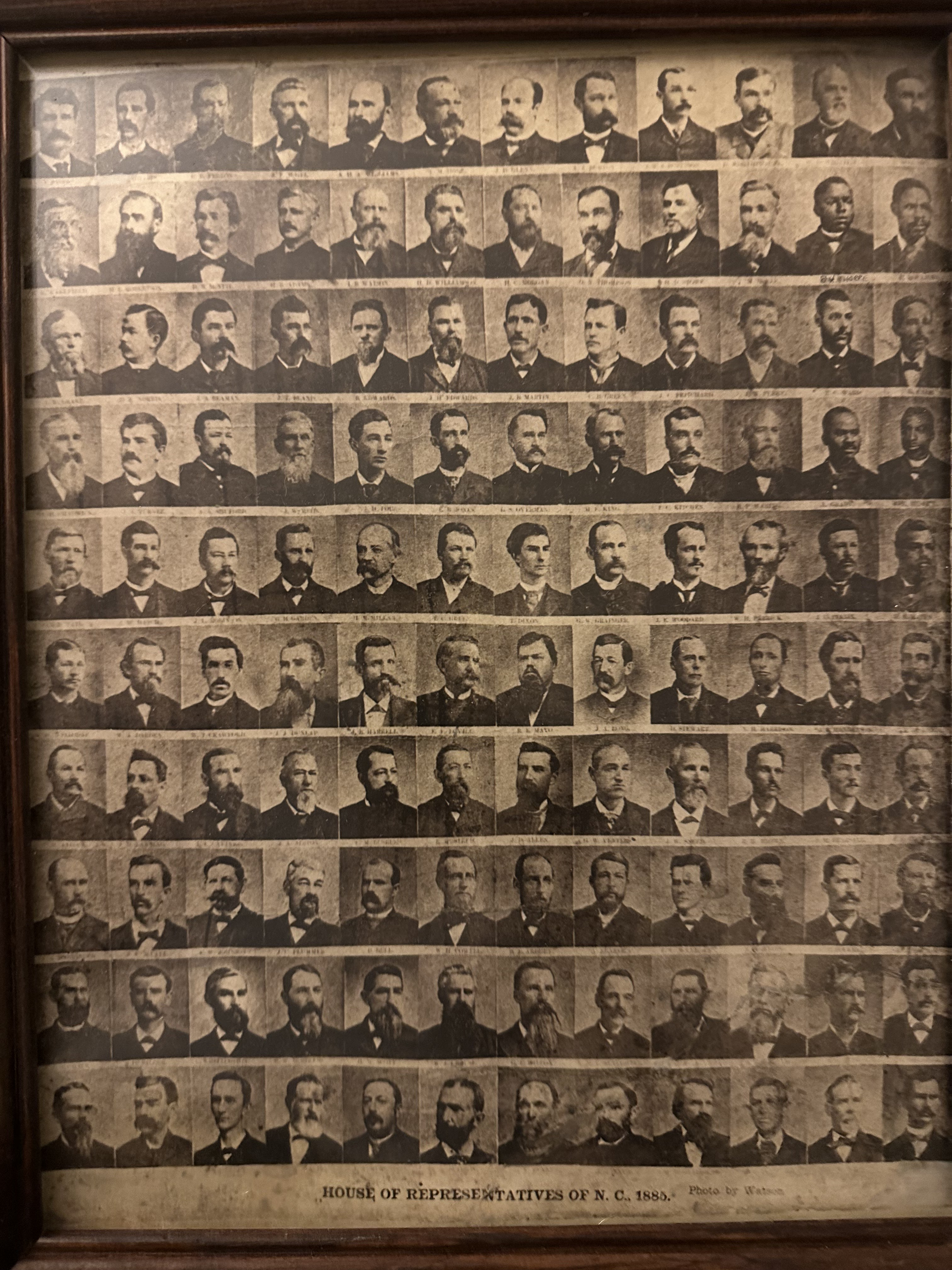
Members of the North Carolina House of Representatives in 1885

W. L. Crouse (July 29, 1849-?) was a state legislator in North Carolina. He served in the North Carolina House of Representatives for several terms. He represented Lincoln County, North Carolina

David Crouse was his father. He attended Catawba High School. He was a Democrat. He married and had three children. His wife was the daughter of S. D. Stowe. A doctor, he graduated from Washington University of Maryland.

== See also ==
- Crouse, North Carolina
