= North Carolina Highway 67 =

State highway in North Carolina, US

North Carolina Highway 67

Route information
- Maintained by NCDOT
- Length: 40.9 mi (65.8 km)
- Existed: c. 1930–present

Major junctions
- West end: US 21 Bus. in Jonesville
- I-77 / US 21 in Jonesville; US 601 in Boonville; US 421 in Winston-Salem
- East end: NC 150 in Winston-Salem

Location
- Country: United States
- State: North Carolina
- Counties: Yadkin, Forsyth

Highway system
- North Carolina Highway System; Interstate; US; State; Scenic
← NC 66	→ NC 68

North Carolina Highway 67 (NC 67) is a 40.9-mile-long (65.8 km) primary state highway in the U.S. state of North Carolina. The highway travels through Yadkin and Forsyth Counties between its western terminus at U.S. Route 21 Business (US 21 Business) in Jonesville and NC 150 in Winston-Salem. NC 67 primarily follows an east–west alignment and connects the towns of Jonesville, Boonville, and East Bend, along with the city of Winston-Salem.

The first NC 67 was established as an original North Carolina state highway in 1921 traversing a route between Taylorsville and Sparta. The highway was later extended south to Conover in 1926, but was replaced by NC 16 and NC 18 by 1929. Modern-day NC 67 was created in 1930 travelling from US 21 and NC 26 in Jonesville to US 421 and NC 60 in Oldtown. The highway was significantly rebuilt between 1931 and 1933, reducing its mileage but maintaining a similar alignment. In 1962 it was extended southeast along the former alignment of US 421 to US 52 in downtown Winston-Salem. The eastern terminus was adjusted in 1969 to end at Interstate 40 (I-40), US 158, and US 421 in Winston-Salem, and it was adjusted to end at NC 150 in Winston-Salem in 1995.

== Route description ==
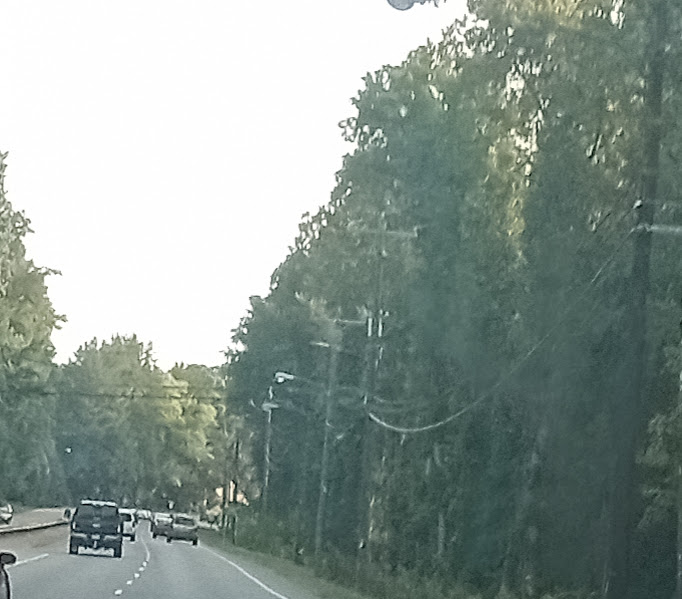
NC 67 Westbound towards Wake Forest University

The western terminus of NC 67 is located at US 21 Business in Jonesville. NC 67 travels east along Winston Road, reaching Interstate 77 (I-77) and US 21 at exit 82, a diamond interchange. The roadway turns to the northeast near an intersection with Messick Road before turning back to an east-southeasterly direction. Departing Jonesville, it primarily runs through rural Yadkin County until entering Boonville and picking up the name Main Street. Main Street primarily travels through a residential area until intersecting US 601 (Carolina Avenue) in the downtown area. East of the intersection, NC 67 leaves Boonville near Kerr Drive and travels through a predominately rural region, composed of alternating farmland and forested area. NC 67 approaches East Bend from the west and travels south of the downtown area. It exits the town near an intersection with Rabbit Hill Road. Leaving East Bend, NC 67 reenters rural Yadkin County, gradually turns to the east, and crosses the Yadkin River to enter Forsyth County.

Entering into Forsyth County, NC 67 gains the name Reynolda Road. East of an intersection with Littlefield Road, the highway reorients itself several times before finally turning to the southeast. NC 67 travels through Tobaccoville for 0.1 miles (0.16 km) between intersections with Turner Road and Tobaccoville Road. The highway then runs along the Tobaccoville town limits between Tobaccoville Road and Montford Road. As the highway continues southeast, it gradually enters into a suburban residential area northwest of Winston-Salem. NC 67 enters into the city limits of Winston-Salem southeast of an intersection with Bethania Road and passes adjacent to the southern town limits of Bethania. It crosses over Silas Creek Parkway which is a partial controlled-access highway. Reynolda Road and the expressway traverses parallel with each other for 1/2 mile (0.80 km) while the two are also adjacent to the campus of Wake Forest University.

The intersection with Wake Forest Road, acts in the form of the "ramp" for the parkway, with NC 67 proceeding to the southwest along the road until intersecting Silas Creek Parkway. NC 67 turns to traverse southwest along Silas Creek Parkway at the intersection. The particular stretch of Silas Creek Parkway is a four-lane expressway with a speed limit of 45 MPH. The folded diamond interchanges are present in the junctions for both Robinhood Road and with Country Club Road. Entering into the Hanes Mall district, NC 67 comes to the cloverleaf interchange with US 421 (Salem Parkway) 0.6 miles (0.97 km) later. The highway makes a turn to the southeast and meets US 158 (Stratford Road) at another folded diamond. Continuing southeast, the route becomes the blend of expressway and boulevard standard. In this vicinity, Hanes Mall is located to the south of the highway, and Novant Health Forsyth Medical Center is located to the north of the highway. The parkway then comes to the interchange with Bolton Street, before the parkway continues to the east and becomes a four-lane boulevard after the intersection with Chelsea Street. The route soon comes to the Forsyth Tech campus, where the roadway turns to the southeast, after an intersection with Lockland Avenue. The route does a gradual return to the east to parallel Interstate 40. The eastern terminus of NC 67 is located at NC 150 (Peters Creek Parkway) in the south outskirts of Downtown Winston-Salem; which gives access to I-40, directly to the south.

The North Carolina Department of Transportation (NCDOT) measures average daily traffic volumes along many of the roadways it maintains. In 2015, average daily traffic volumes along NC 67 varied from 3,100 vehicles per day west of the intersection with Smithtown Road in Yadkin County to 55,000 vehicles per day along Silas Creek Parkway north of the Country Club Road interchange in Forsyth County. NC 67 is included within the National Highway System (Note: A network of highways in the United States which serve strategic transportation facilities.), along Silas Creek Parkway between Wake Forest Road and US 421. Additionally, NC 67 connects to the National Highway System at I-77 and US 21 east of Jonesville.

== History ==
=== Previous designation ===
North Carolina Highway 67
- Location: Conover–Sparta, NC
- Existed: 1921–1929

The first NC 67 was an original state highway, founded in 1921, that traversed from Conover to Sparta. Originally, the southern terminus of NC 67 was located at NC 75 in Taylorsville. NC 67 then travelled north along a topsoil, sand-clay, or gravel roadway to Moravian Falls where it intersected NC 18. From Moravian Falls, NC 67 travelled northeast along a topsoil, sand-clay, or gravel road, intersecting NC 60 in Wilkesboro. NC 67 continued north-northwest from Wilkesboro through Wilkes County. In the northern part of Wilkes County, the roadway became a graded road and then entered Alleghany County. As NC 67 approached Sparta from the southwest, the roadway became unimproved. The original northern terminus of NC 67 was located at NC 26 in Sparta.

NC 67 was extended south of Taylorsville by 1926. The new southern terminus was located at NC 10 in Conover and utilized an unimproved roadway through Catawba County and Alexander County to reach Taylorsville. Additionally, two sections of NC 67 were paved by 1926, a segment north of Taylorsville in Alexander County and a segment north of Wilkesboro in Wilkes County. NC 67 was decommissioned by 1929. The route between Conover and North Wilkesboro became part of NC 16, while the route between Moravian Falls and Sparta became part of NC 18.

=== Current designation ===
The current NC 67 first appeared on North Carolina state transportation maps in 1930. It began at US 21 and NC 26 in Jonesville and travelled 10 miles (16 km) east to Boonville where it intersected with NC 80. The highway then travelled for approximately 30 miles (48 km) through East Bend and Bethania to end at US 421 and NC 60 (modern-day Old Yadkinville Rd) in Oldtown. At establishment, the routing between Jonesville and Bethania was classified as a topsoil, sand-clay, or gravel road, while the routing from Bethania to US 421 and NC 60 was a paved highway. By 1931, NC 67 was under construction along its entire length between Elkin and Winston-Salem. The entire highway was paved and substantially straightened by 1933, reducing its overall length from approximately 40 miles (64 km) in 1930 to 32 miles (51 km) in 1933.

Between 1949 and 1953, NC 67 was placed onto a new routing in East Bend which created a shallow bypass of the town to the south. The former alignment of NC 67 through East Bend is modern-day Main Street. The North Carolina State Highway Commission approved a bid by Harvey H. Stewart Company to replace the bridge across the Yadkin River in September 1950. At the time, the bridge was considered important for national defense and the reconstruction was paid through federal funds. By 1962, US 421 was placed onto its modern-day alignment, running south of Lewisville to I-40. NC 67 was extended southeast along a portion of the former alignment of US 421. It utilized Reynolda Road to Fourth Street and Fifth Street in downtown Winston-Salem. Then NC 67 utilized Fourth and Fifth Street as split streets to its new eastern terminus at US 52 and NC 8. Eastbound NC 67 utilized Fourth Street and westbound NC 67 utilized Fifth Street. By 1966, US 21 was placed onto a new bypass of Elkin and Jonesville alongside a new section of I-77. The former route of US 21 at the western terminus of NC 67 became US 21 Business. On February 7, 1969, NCDOT removed NC 67 from Fourth Street and Fifth Street in Winston-Salem. Instead, the highway continued south along Reynolda Road (modern-day Broad Street) to an interchange with I-40, US 158, and US 421. In 1995, NC 67 was removed from Reynolda Road between Wake Forest University and I-40 in downtown Winston-Salem. Instead it was routed to follow along Silas Creek Parkway, after it follows Reynolda Road. This bypasses most of downtown Winston-Salem to the west, and ends at NC 150, its modern-day eastern terminus.

== Future ==
NC 67 is planned to have an interchange with the Winston-Salem Northern Beltway as part of the project to create a partial beltway around the city of Winston-Salem. The interchange is planned to be located between Bethania and Tobaccoville, approximately where NC 67 currently intersects Roberts Road. Upon completion, the Northern Beltway between US 158 and US 52 will be numbered as NC 452. The same segment of the Northern Beltway was also approved by the American Association of State Highway and Transportation Officials (AASHTO) in 2019 to become I-274 upon completion. NCDOT has funded the project with right of way acquisition to begin in 2025 and construction to begin in 2027.

== Major intersections ==
County	Location	mi	km	Destinations	Notes
Yadkin	Jonesville	0.0	0.0	US 21 Bus. (North Bridge Street) to NC 268 Bus.	Western terminus
Yadkin	Jonesville	1.4– 1.6	2.3– 2.6	I-77 / US 21 – Statesville, Mount Airy	I-77 exit 82; Diamond interchange
Yadkin	Boonville	7.8	12.6	US 601 (South Carolina Avenue)	
Forsyth	Winston-Salem	34.1	54.9	Silas Creek Parkway north	NC 67 west signed as an interchange on Silas Creek Parkway north
Forsyth	Winston-Salem	35.3– 35.6	56.8– 57.3	Robinhood Road	Partial cloverleaf interchange
Forsyth	Winston-Salem	36.8– 36.9	59.2– 59.4	Country Club Road	Partial cloverleaf interchange; Tiseland Drive provides access to and from NC 67 westbound
Forsyth	Winston-Salem	37.4– 37.7	60.2– 60.7	US 421 (Salem Parkway)	Cloverleaf interchange; US 421 exit 237 A-B
Forsyth	Winston-Salem	37.9– 38.1	61.0– 61.3	US 158 (Stratford Road)	Folded diamond interchange
Forsyth	Winston-Salem	38.8– 39.0	62.4– 62.8	Bolton Street	Folded diamond interchange.
Forsyth	Winston-Salem	40.9	65.8	NC 150 (Peters Creek Parkway) to I-40 Silas Creek Parkway south	Eastern terminus, Continuation as Silas Creek Parkway
1.000 mi = 1.609 km; 1.000 km = 0.621 mi
