= Crouse, North Carolina =

- Census-designated place
- Location within North Carolina Location within the United States
- Coordinates: 35°25′17″N 81°18′10″W
- Country: United States
- State: North Carolina
- County: Lincoln

Area
  - Total: 1.14 sq mi (2.94 km^{2})
  - Land: 1.14 sq mi (2.94 km^{2})
  - Water: 0 sq mi (0.00 km^{2})
- Elevation: 860 ft (260 m)

Population (2020)
  - Total: 322
  - Density: 283.7/sq mi (109.53/km^{2})
- Time zone: UTC-5 (Eastern (EST))
  - Summer (DST): UTC-4 (EDT)
- ZIP code: 28033
- Area code: 704
- GNIS feature ID: 2805282

Crouse is an unincorporated community and census-designated place (CDP) in Lincoln County, North Carolina, United States. It was first listed as a CDP in the 2020 census with a population of 322. Crouse has a post office with ZIP code 28033.

== Transportation ==
The community's main freeway is NC-150 which one portion of the freeway bypasses its former street route known as "Old NC 150." Other non freeway roads include St. Mark's Church Road which intersects NC-279 and Pleasant Grove Church Road.

== Demographics ==
Historical population
Census	Pop.	Note	%±
2020	322		—
U.S. Decennial Census; 2020

=== 2020 census ===
Crouse CDP, North Carolina – Demographic Profile (NH = Non-Hispanic)
Race / Ethnicity	Pop 2020	% 2020
White alone (NH)	289	89.75%
Black or African American alone (NH)	8	2.48%
Native American or Alaska Native alone (NH)	1	0.31%
Asian alone (NH)	2	0.62%
Pacific Islander alone (NH)	0	0.00%
Some Other Race alone (NH)	1	0.31%
Mixed Race/Multi-Racial (NH)	10	3.11%
Hispanic or Latino (any race)	11	3.42%
Total	322	100.00%

Note: the US Census treats Hispanic/Latino as an ethnic category. This table excludes Latinos from the racial categories and assigns them to a separate category. Hispanics/Latinos can be of any race.
