= North Carolina Highway 150 =

State highway in North Carolina, US

North Carolina Highway 150
- NC 150 in red

Route information
- Maintained by NCDOT
- Length: 184.4 mi (296.8 km)
- Existed: 1929–present
- Tourist routes: Colonial Heritage Byway; Mill Bridge Scenic Byway

Major junctions
- West end: SC 150 at the South Carolina state line near Boiling Springs
- US 74 / NC 226 in Shelby; US 321 in Lincolnton; I-77 in Mooresville; I-85 / US 29 / US 52 / US 70 near Linwood; US 64 near Lexington; I-40 in Winston-Salem; I-74 / US 158 / US 421 in Winston-Salem; US 52 / NC 8 in Winston-Salem; I-73 in Summerfield; US 29 near Browns Summit
- East end: US 158 near Yanceyville

Location
- Country: United States
- State: North Carolina
- Counties: Cleveland, Gaston, Lincoln, Catawba, Iredell, Rowan, Davidson, Forsyth, Guilford, Rockingham, Caswell

Highway system
- North Carolina Highway System; Interstate; US; State; Scenic
← NC 149	→ NC 151

North Carolina Highway 150 (NC 150) is a primary state highway in the U.S. state of North Carolina. It serves the Foothills and Piedmont Triad areas of the state, connecting the cities of Shelby, Mooresville, Salisbury and Winston-Salem.

== Route description ==
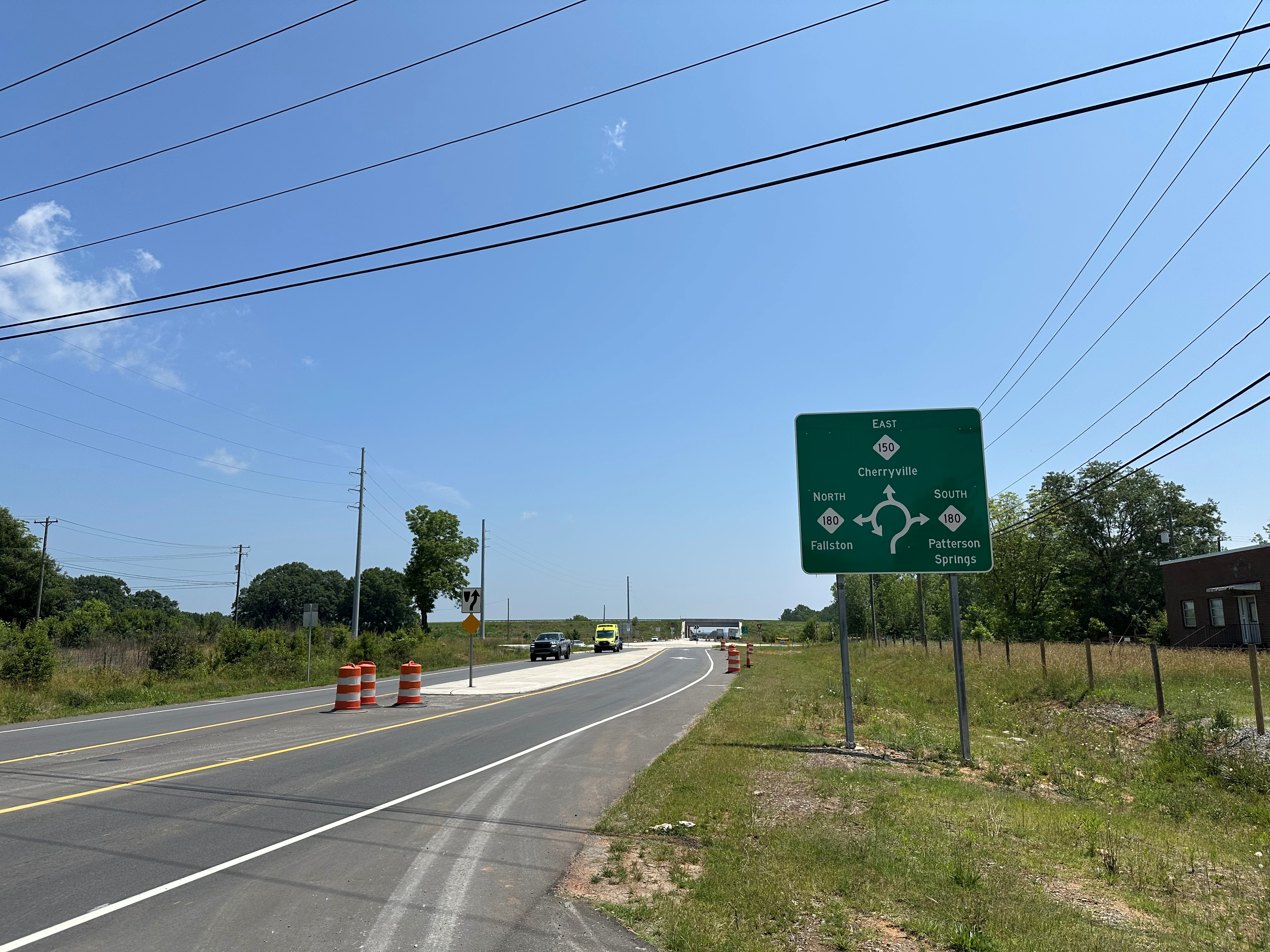
Roundabout sign coming from Shelby

=== Gaston and Cleveland counties ===
In Gaston County, NC 150 downgrades to a street. It travels through central Cherryville, North Carolina, where it meets NC 274. After crossing into Cleveland County, the route travels through Waco and across a small part of Kings Mountain Reservoir. Shortly after crossing NC 180, NC 150 enters Shelby, where it joins US 74 Business westbound. In downtown, NC 150 switches roads to share NC 18 south out of town. Two miles after crossing the mainline US 74, NC 150 and NC 18 split. NC 150 heads due west to Boiling Springs, where the route turns due south across the Broad River to end at the South Carolina state line. SC 150 continues south across the line toward I-85 again and Gaffney, South Carolina.

=== Catawba and Lincoln counties ===
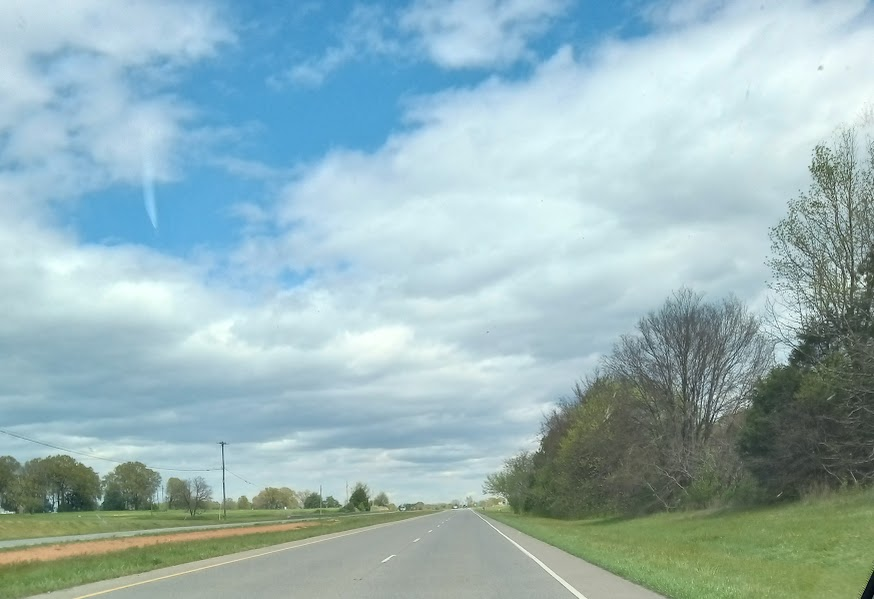
NC 150 near Crouse

After crossing a couple of bridges across Lake Norman, Marshall Steam Station is visible on the right. NC 150 continues past the power plant through the lake-oriented communities of Terrell and Sherrills Ford, crossing over numerous tributaries of the lake/Catawba River. Shortly after meeting NC 16 at a four-way intersection, NC 150 crosses into Lincoln County. In Lincolnton, NC 150 and NC 27 join for a two-mile (3.2 km) segment through a commercial district, splitting shortly after an interchange with the US 321 freeway. Through the entire NC 27 concurrency, NC 150 is also concurrent with North Carolina Bicycle Route 6. NC 150 continues southward, along with NC 155 and the business route of US 321, after the split east of downtown. Shortly outside the town, NC 150 splits from NC 155 and heads in a southwest direction through Crouse and across the county line where NC 150 becomes an expressway.

=== Rowan and Iredell counties ===
Continuing on westbound NC 150, the route crosses the Yadkin into Rowan County along with US 29/70 on a new bridge with the Wil-Cox Bridge on the side which carries pedestrians. The three conjoined highways continue together through downtown Spencer, passing Spencer Shops, and split in downtown Salisbury. NC 150 heads due west once again toward Mooresville, crossing into Iredell County.

Just outside Mooresville, NC 150 joins NC 152 for a short 0.25-mile (0.40 km) concurrency before splitting on a northern bypass route (Oak Ridge Farm Highway), skipping downtown Mooresville. After crossing NC 801 and NC 115, the highway enters a dense commercial shopping area along Plaza Drive. This stretch of road has witnessed massive growth in the early 2000s (decade) with the construction of numerous big box stores as a result of the growing popularity of nearby Lake Norman and the local NASCAR racing culture. As a consequence, NC 150 through western Mooresville was widened to a 4-lane boulevard in the early 2000s (decade). This developed area continues past NC 150's interchanges with US 21 and I-77. A few miles after crossing the Interstate, NC 150 returns to a two-lane road known as River Highway. The route enters the Lake Norman area, passing many businesses tailored to tourists, fishermen, and boating enthusiasts, before actually crossing the lake into Catawba County.

=== Davidson County ===
At I-85, NC 150's routing used to be quite unusual. Before the reconstruction of the I-85 through the area, the westbound NC 150 roadway merged onto I-85 southbound lanes and the routes were concurrent for about 0.25 miles (0.40 km) before NC 150 left-exited with US 29/70 southward. Northbound US 29/70 and eastbound NC 150 entered I-85 northbound on the left and the NC 150 exit ramp was immediately on the right. Since it was nearly impossible for one traveling on NC 150 northbound to exit there, motorists were directed to the next exit, Clark Road, which returned to the main roadway using TO NC 150 signs. In the late 2000s, I-85 received a new Yadkin River crossing, which also eliminated the awkward left exit and entrance for NC 150 and US 29/70. NC 150 is no longer concurrent with I-85, but instead follows US 29/70 on a new parallel road down to the Yadkin River crossing. Near the Churchland community, NC 150 takes an odd turn east, despite being signed west, toward I-85/US 29/70/52 to avoid crossing the Yadkin River. The highway passes through an interchange with US 64 and continues into the communities of Tyro and Reeds. NC 150 becomes a two-lane road again as the highway continues southward (signed west) through the community of Arcadia.

=== Forsyth County ===
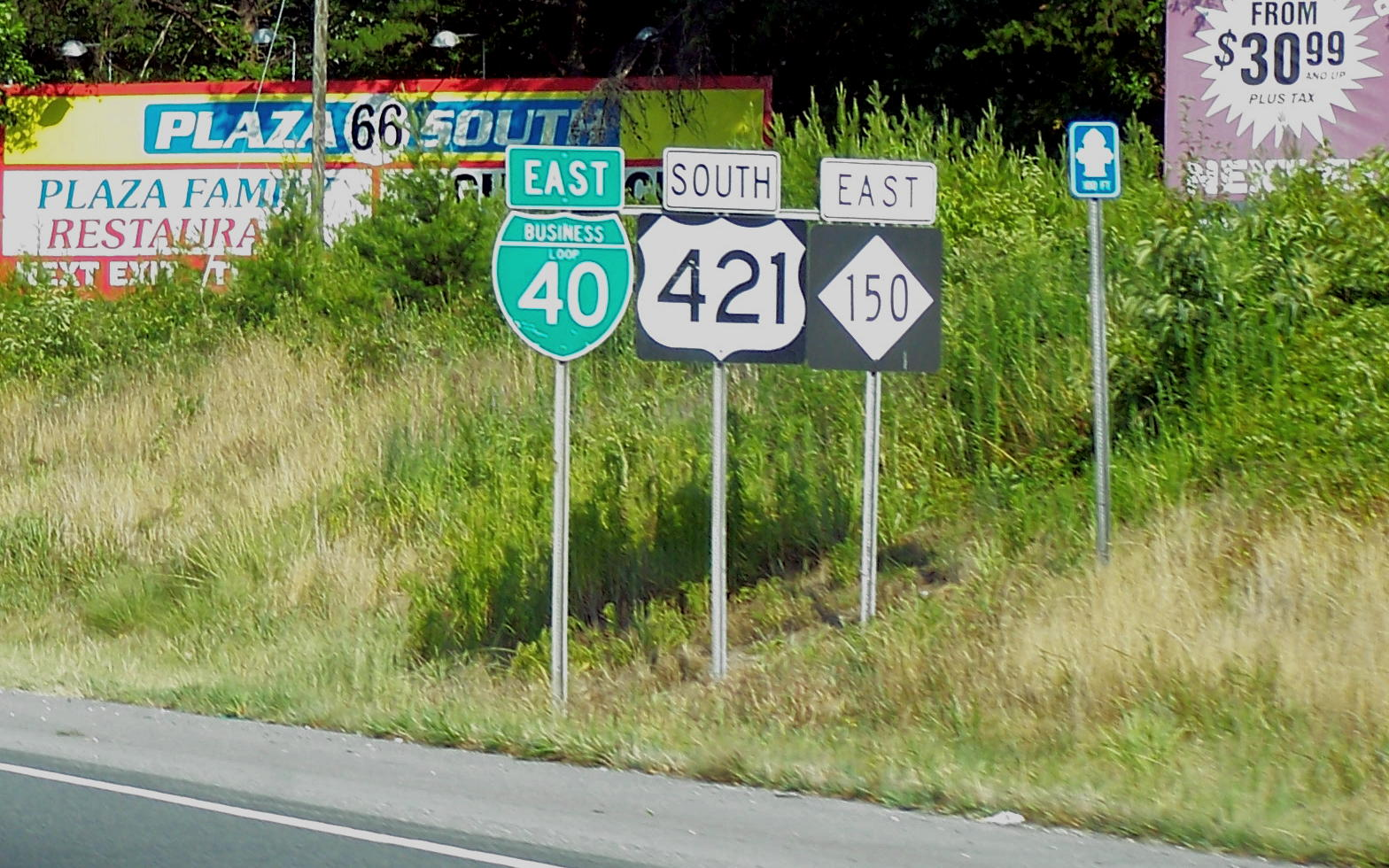
Reassurance marker assembly near Kernersville in 2009. I-40 Bus. has since been decommissioned.

When entering into Forsyth County, the route comes into the outskirts of the village limits of Clemmons and eventually the eastern parallel of the village. Inside Winston-Salem, Peters Creek Parkway carries NC 150 using the rural expressway stretch with a speed limit of 55 mph (89 km/h). Entering into Winston-Salem, the expressway intersects at-grade with Stafford Village Boulevard. The route enters into the southern outskirts of Downtown Winston-Salem, with the route coming to the diamond interchange with Clemmonsville Road, before downgrading to a four-lane boulevard with the speed limit of 45 mph (72 km/h). Continuing north, it comes to the major trumpet interchange with Interstate 40 and at-grade junction with Silas Creek Parkway (NC-67). NC 150 continues inside the district, before it leaves Peters Creek Parkway at a folded-diamond interchange with Salem Parkway (US 421 and US 158), with Salem Parkway continuing east-west inside Downtown Winston-Salem. NC 150 continues inside Downtown Kernersville, before exiting off from Salem Parkway with the Macy Grove Road (Kernersville Loop) interchange, serving the east end of the concurrency with US 421. NC 150 travels along the expressway stretch of the Loop with the speed limit of 45 mph (72 km/h), coming to the one-quadrant interchange with Mountain Street. After the route traverses with adjacent houses located alongside the loop, NC 150 comes to the at-grade intersection with North Main Street, with the route leaving and loop and traversing northeast along North Main Street. NC 150 continues along North Main Street, exiting Forsyth County.

=== Caswell, Rockingham, and Guilford counties ===
NC 150 travels west from its eastern terminus at U.S. Route 158 (US 158) in rural Caswell County on a winding two-lane road into Rockingham County. Shortly after crossing the county line, NC 150 has a short 1-mile-long (1.6 km) concurrency with NC 87 through the unincorporated community of Williamsburg. NC 150 exits the concurrency to the south, crossing into Guilford County shortly thereafter. As It enters Osceola, it turns right at a junction with NC 61, which has its northern terminus here. NC 150, remaining a two-lane route, continues westward again, through the small community of Monticello, before coming to an interchange with Future Interstate 785 (I-785) and US 29.

Slowing to a 35 mph (56 km/h) speed limit after the interchange, NC 150 progresses towards Browns Summit, the first of three northern Greensboro suburbs the route passes through. After passing through a small road kink at a railroad crossing in the middle of Browns Summit, the route makes its way entirely across the rural community, thereby effectively bypassing Greensboro and remaining north of the county. As NC 150 approaches Summerfield (another suburb), numerous housing developments can be seen on either side of the road. NC 150 enters Summerfield's commercial district, at the US 220 and Auburn Road junction, where a handful of shopping centers can be found, and then turns right and shares a short 1.3-mile (2.1 km) concurrency with US 220 northbound. Continuing west again with the name "Oak Ridge Road", NC 150 encounters an interchange with Interstate 73. After that, NC 150 enters the final Greensboro suburb of Oak Ridge, where it passes by the Oak Ridge Military Academy at its intersection with NC 68. NC 150 continues on a southwest course out of Oak Ridge and Guilford County.

== History ==
NC 150 was designated around 1929 as a spur route from the first NC 15, which is now mostly part of US 29. Its first routing ran west from Salisbury to Mooresville. By 1931, the route was extended through Lincolnton to US 74 in Shelby. The highway previously linking Lincolnton and Shelby was designated as NC 206.

NC 150's massive extension east occurred in late 1939 or 1940, giving the route its current eastern terminus at US 158 and western terminus at the South Carolina state line. It was partially cosigned in parts with US 29/70/52, US 74, NC 18, and old alignment of NC 184.

NC 150 underwent numerous realignments in 1950s in Winston-Salem with the construction of the new "parkways" (Silas Creek Parkway, Peters Creek Parkway, Corporation Parkway).

Peters Creek Parkway, at the time, a rural expressway, was constructed with NC 150 being routed on it in 1956, leaving behind the Old Salisbury Road. The segment of NC 150 through Mooresville was replaced with a northern bypass route in the late 1950s. In 1994, NC 150 was routed to be run totally along Peters Creek Parkway from then-south of Downtown Winston-Salem, and east to follow then-Interstate 40 Business and further along NC 66 going inside Downtown Kernersville. In the 2000s, NC 150 through Mooresville was widened to a four-lane boulevard, alongside southern Peters Creek Parkway in southern Winston-Salem noticing further development. In 2020, NC 150 was removed from exiting off from its concurrency with NC 150 inside the center of Downtown Kernersville after its concurrency with the then-recently redesignated Salem Parkway, and instead extended further east alongside Salem Parkway and exiting off onto Macy Grove Road.

NC 150, once signed as North and South, was converted in 1982 to its current East and West signage and description.

== Junction list ==
County	Location	mi	km	Exit	Destinations	Notes
Cleveland		0.0	0.0		SC 150 south – Gaffney	Continuation beyond South Carolina state line
Cleveland	Boiling Springs	5.4	8.7		College Avenue – Cliffside	
Cleveland	Shelby	11.5	18.5		NC 18 (Lafayette Street) – Gaffney	South end of NC 18 Truck overlap
Cleveland	Shelby	13.7	22.0		US 74 / NC 226 (Dixon Boulevard) – Kings Mountain, Patterson Springs, Forest City	
Cleveland	Shelby	14.7	23.7		US 74 Bus. west (Marion Street)	West end of US 74 Bus. and north end of NC 18 Truck overlap
Cleveland	Shelby	16.2	26.1		US 74 Bus. east (Marion Street)	East end of US 74 Bus. overlap
Cleveland	Shelby	17.6	28.3		NC 180 (Post Road) – Patterson Springs, Fallston	Roundabout; to Cleveland County Fairgrounds
Cleveland	Shelby	17.8	28.6		To NC 226 (Shelby Bypass)	Double roundabout interchange
Gaston	Cherryville	26.0	41.8		NC 274 (Mountain Street) – Bessemer City, Morganton	
Gaston	Cherryville	27.1	43.6		NC 279 east (Rudisill Street) – Dallas	
Lincoln	Roseland	33.1	53.3		West Highway 150 – Lincolnton	West end of NC 27 Truck overlap
Lincoln	Lincolnton	35.5	57.1		US 321 Bus. south (Gastonia Highway) – High Shoals	South end of US 321 Bus. overlap; diamond interchange
Lincoln	Lincolnton	37.2	59.9		US 321 Bus. north (Generals Boulevard) / NC 27 west (Main Street) – Maiden	North end of US 321 Bus., west end of NC 27 and east end of NC 27 Truck overlap
Lincoln	Lincolnton	37.8	60.8		US 321 – Gastonia, Hickory	Partial cloverleaf interchange
Lincoln	Boger City	39.2	63.1		NC 27 east – Mount Holly, Lowesville	East end of NC 27 overlap
Catawba		48.3	77.7		NC 16 – Charlotte, Newton	Diamond interchange
Catawba	Killian Crossroads	49.1	79.0		NC 16 Bus. – Denver, Newton	
Iredell	Mooresville	61.8	99.5		I-77 – Charlotte, Statesville	Diamond interchange; exit 36
Iredell	Mooresville	63.1	101.5		US 21 (Charlotte Highway) – Charlotte, Troutman	Diamond interchange
Iredell	Mooresville	64.5	103.8		NC 3 south / NC 152 east (Iredell Avenue) – Downtown Mooresville	West end of NC 152 Truck overlap
Iredell	Mooresville	64.9	104.4		NC 115 (Broad Street/Statesville Highway) – Troutman	
Iredell	Mooresville	66.3	106.7		NC 801 (Mount Ulla Highway) – Mount Ulla	
Iredell	Mooresville	67.7	109.0		NC 152 west (Landis Highway) – Downtown Mooresville	West end of NC 152 and east end of NC 152 Truck overlap
Iredell		68.0	109.4		NC 152 east (Landis Highway) – China Grove, Landis	East end of NC 152 overlap
Rowan	Salisbury	84.6	136.2		US 70 / US 601 (Jake Alexander Boulevard) – Concord, Statesville, Mocksville	
Rowan	Salisbury	86.7	139.5		US 29 south / US 70 west (Main Street) – China Grove	South end of US 29 and west end of US 70 overlap
Rowan	Salisbury	78.8	126.8		Innes Street	
Rowan	Yadkin River	92.6	149.0	Bridge over Yadkin River		
Davidson		93.0	149.7		I-85 / US 52 south	Permanently closed as of April, 2010; was exit 82
Davidson		93.5	150.5		I-85 / US 52 north	Permanently closed as of May, 2013; was exit 83
Davidson		93.8	151.0		I-85 / US 29 north / US 52 / US 70 east – Charlotte, Greensboro	North end of US 29 and east end of US 70 overlap; exit 84
Davidson		106.0	170.6		US 64 – Lexington, Mocksville	Partial cloverleaf interchange
Forsyth	Winston-Salem	121.5	195.5		Clemmonsville Road	Double roundabout interchange
Forsyth	Winston-Salem	123.0	197.9		I-40 – Statesville, Greensboro	Trumpet interchange; exit 192
Forsyth	Winston-Salem	123.3	198.4		NC 67 west (Silas Creek Parkway)	
Forsyth	Winston-Salem	124.9	201.0	—	US 158 / US 421 north (Salem Parkway) – Yadkinville	West end of US 158/US 421 overlap; exit 234A of US 158/US 421
Forsyth	Winston-Salem	125.3	201.7	—	Broad Street	Permanently closed as of November 2018
Forsyth	Winston-Salem	125.6	202.1	233B	Cherry Street / Marshall Street	To Convention Center; Cherry Street signed indirectly from eastbound; Marshall Street signed indirectly from westbound
Forsyth	Winston-Salem	125.7	202.3	233A	Main Street	Westbound exit and eastbound entrance; to Old Salem and Salem College
Forsyth	Winston-Salem	126.3	203.3	232B-C	US 52 / NC 8 (John Gold Memorial Expressway) – Lexington, Mount Airy, Smith Reynolds Airport	NC 8 unsigned on guide signs; Smith Reynolds Airport signed as "Airport"
Forsyth	Winston-Salem	126.7	203.9	232A	Martin Luther King Jr. Drive	To Winston-Salem State University
Forsyth	Winston-Salem	127.7	205.5	231	Lowery Street / Fifth Street	Eastbound Lowery Street, westbound Fifth Street
Forsyth	Winston-Salem	128.6	207.0	230	US 158 east (Reidsville Road) – Walkertown, Reidsville	East end of US 158 overlap; eastbound exit and westbound entrance
Forsyth	Winston-Salem	130.4	209.9	228	Linville Road	
Forsyth	Kernersville	132.3	212.9	227	I-74 – Wytheville, High Point	
Forsyth	Kernersville	134.5	216.5	224	South Main Street – Kernersville	
Forsyth	Kernersville	136.1	219.0	222	NC 66 – Kernersville, Walkertown	
Forsyth	Kernersville	137.2	220.8	221	US 421 south (Salem Parkway) – Greensboro	South end of US 421 overlap
Forsyth	Kernersville	138.0	222.1		Mountain Street	One-Quadrant Interchange; Mountain Street currently signed only on eastbound.
Guilford	Oak Ridge	143.0	230.1		NC 68 – Greensboro, Stokesdale	
Guilford	Summerfield	147.3	237.1		I-73 – Martinsville, Greensboro	I-73 exit 117
Guilford	Summerfield	148.7	239.3		US 220 north – Madison	North end of US 220 overlap
Guilford	Summerfield	150.0	241.4		US 220 south – Greensboro	South end of US 220 overlap
Guilford	Browns Summit	163.0	262.3		US 29 – Greensboro, Reidsville	Partial cloverleaf interchange
Guilford	Osceola	167.4	269.4		NC 61 south – Gibsonville	
Rockingham	Williamsburg	171.6	276.2		NC 87 north – Reidsville	North end of NC 87 overlap
Rockingham		172.7	277.9		NC 87 south – Burlington	South end of NC 87 overlap
Caswell		183.2	294.8		US 158 – Reidsville, Yanceyville	
1.000 mi = 1.609 km; 1.000 km = 0.621 mi: Closed/former; Concurrency terminus; Unopened

== Special routes ==
=== Lincolnton alternate route ===
North Carolina Highway 150A
- Location: Lincolnton, North Carolina
- Length: 3.9 mi (6.3 km)
- Existed: 1956–1960

North Carolina Highway 150A (NC 150A) was established in 1956 when NC 150 was rerouted onto new primary routing bypassing southeast of downtown Lincolnton; the old alignment became NC 150A. The route followed West Highway 150 to Riverside Drive, where it linked-up with NC 27. In concurrency, it goes through downtown area via Main Street and Court Square Drive before linking back with NC 150 at Generals Boulevard. In 1960, NC 150A was decommissioned, leaving NC 27 through most of it and downgrade for West Highway 150 (SR 1407).

=== Mooresville alternate route ===
North Carolina Highway 150A
- Location: Mooresville, North Carolina
- Length: 1.6 mi (2.6 km)
- Existed: 1953–1955

North Carolina Highway 150A (NC 150A) was established between 1950 and 1953 as a renumbering of NC 150 along McLand Street and Main Street through downtown Mooresville. Around 1955, NC 150 was completely removed from the downtown area and NC 150A was renumbered as NC 152.
