= Salem Parkway (North Carolina) =

Highway in North Carolina

Salem Parkway
- Route of Salem Parkway highlighted in red

Route information
- Length: 18.5 mi (29.8 km)
- Existed: 2020–present
- History: 1958–1992 as I-40/East–West Expressway; 1992–2020 as I-40 Business; 2016–present as Salem Parkway
- Component highways: US 421 (entire length); US 158 from Stratford Road to Reidsville Road in Winston-Salem; NC 150 from Winston-Salem to Kernersville

Major junctions
- West end: I-40 / US 421 in Winston-Salem
- US 158 in Winston-Salem; US 52 / NC 8 in Winston-Salem; I-74 in Kernersville
- East end: I-40 / US 421 near Colfax

Location
- Country: United States
- State: North Carolina
- Counties: Forsyth, Guilford

Highway system
- North Carolina Highway System; Interstate; US; State; Scenic

The Salem Parkway is an artery corridor located mostly in Forsyth County in the U.S. state of North Carolina, designated U.S. Route 421 (US 421) for its entire length. The parkway is divided into two segments under Interstate 74 (I-74/Winston-Salem Northern Beltway). Between I-40 (exit 188) and I-74, the parkway serves the center of downtown Winston-Salem, which also features "Twin City Trail." East of I-74, the parkway serves Downtown Kernersville, before merging with I-40 west of Greensboro (exit 206). The parkway in its entirety is 18.5-mile (29.8 km) long.

== Route description ==
=== Downtown Winston-Salem ===
The parkway begins in the vicinity of the split between US 421 (exit 238) and I-40 (exit 188). US 421 continues northeast and merges onto Salem Parkway; upon exiting the interchange, shortly before coming to the Silas Creek Parkway (NC 67) with a cloverleaf interchange. Silas Creek Parkway reaches the interchange with Stratford Road (US 158), with the parkway turning east and traversing concurrently with US 158. The corridor enters into the center of Downtown Winston-Salem, before coming to the folded-diamond interchange with Peters Creek Parkway (NC 150), in which NC 150 joins the concurrency. The Salem Parkway is parallel to sidewalks which are located on the hills that are adjacent to the highway, which is inside the central areas of Downtown. The parkway comes to the junctions with Marshall Street and Cherry Street before traversing under the Strollway. A half-interchange allows access to the one-way northbound Main Street, with only a westbound off-ramp and eastbound on-ramp. The Twin-City Trail is located inside this area.

=== Central Segment ===
The parkway leaves the center of Downtown Winston-Salem, where it comes to a cloverleaf junction with the John Gold Memorial Expressway (US 52/NC 8, with NC 8 being unsigned) at a cloverleaf interchange (with the stretch of US 52 slated to become I-285). The parkway comes to a folded diamond junction with Martin Luther King Jr. Drive immediately after. US 158 exits the Salem Parkway onto Reidsville Road at a partial interchange, with the parkway continuing east concurrent with US 421 and NC 150. East of the city limits, the parkway comes to a mostly-cloverleaf junction with I-74 (Winston-Salem Northern Beltway), with I-74 giving direct access to I-40 in this vicinity.

=== Kernersville ===
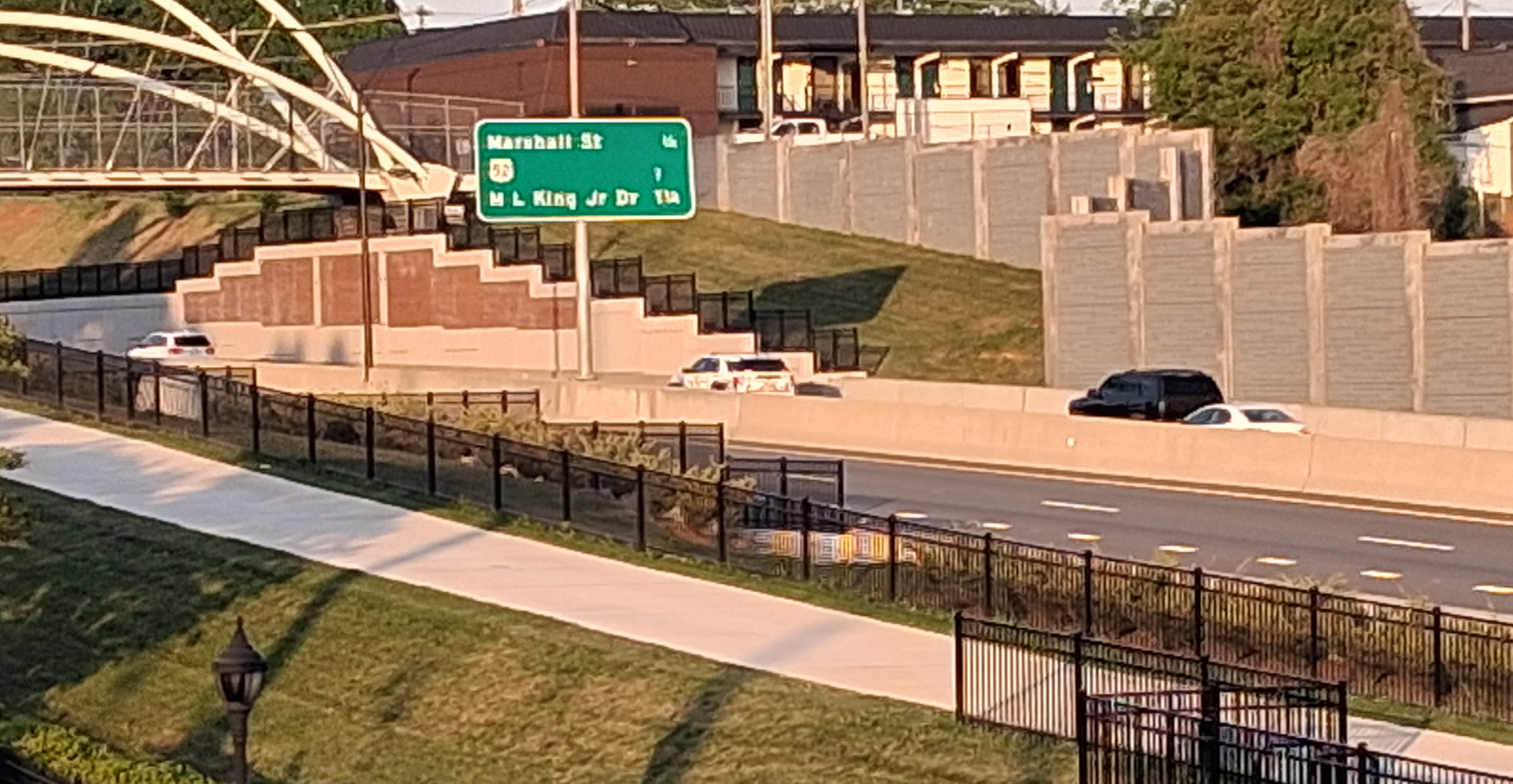
Salem Pkwy in Downtown Winston-Salem in 2026

Salem Parkway continues inside central Kernersville, where it comes to under construction junction with Big Mill Farm Road (the under-construction Kernersville Loop), before coming to the diamond junction with South Main Street, in which South Main Street gives access to the overall "developed" areas of the town. The parkway traverses the southern downtown area for one mile, coming to the exit with NC 66. Exiting the central district, the route comes to the interchange with Macy Grove Road ("also," the under-construction Kernersville Loop), with NC 150 exiting the parkway. The Salem Parkway, after coming to the junction, enters into Guilford County, shortly before ending at a half-interchange with I-40 in the area surrounding Colfax, with only an eastbound entrance and westbound exit on I-40.

== History ==
The current-day Salem Parkway, in its origins, is the consolidation of existing expressways and full freeways in central Winston-Salem and inside what was once south of most of Kernersville.

The towns of Winston and Salem officially formed one city in the year 1913. The newly combined city was not only a merger of local government but a joining of two different road systems. By the 1940s, Winston-Salem grew to become the largest manufacturing hub in the state, as a result of companies including R. J. Reynolds Tobacco Company and the P.H. Hanes Knitting Company. Notable highways had connected the city, with no direct corridor connecting one area with the other without the use of "making turns," resulting in traffic congestion in the downtown area. From 1946 to 1956, various traffic pattern studies were performed, and plans were created to address the impacts of traffic inside the area.

=== East–West Expressway ===
Around 1955, an expressway stretch for US 421 opened in the eastern areas of Forsyth County, spanning from Linville Road to Mountain Street. This expressway was considered in the area south of Kernersville. Work would have been underway to build the connecting new expressway, directly linking.

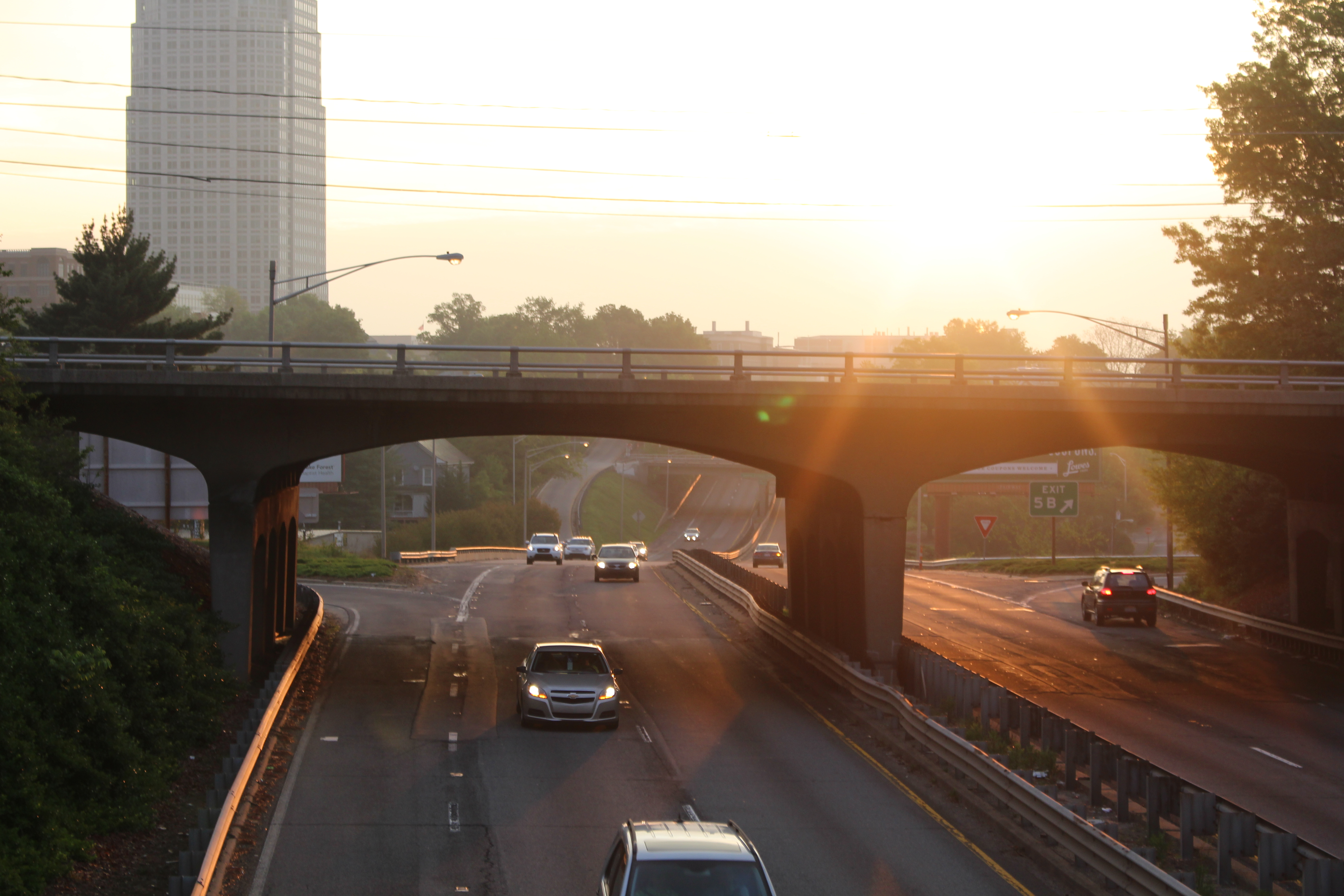
Sunrise over the Broad Street bridge. The bridge has since been replaced.

The previous year, Winston-Salem gave the state $1 million to buy right-of-way for what was titled the East–West Expressway. This was built to be a full-fledged east-west corridor for the city of Winston-Salem, with construction beginning that same year as the right-of-way was acquired. Though it was planned to become a new routing of US 158, that changed two years later, when the Federal Aid Highway Act of 1956 was passed, and North Carolina was allocated 714 miles (1,149 km) for its share of the Interstate Highway System; 219 miles (352 km) was subsequently allocated for a route from the Tennessee state line, through Asheville and Winston-Salem, to Greensboro. The expressway was slightly shifted to become a complete controlled-access highway, I-40 was eventually designated onto the East–West Expressway, which allowed the expressway to actually become the first completed section of Interstate in the state.

On January 6, 1958, the first 1.2-mile-long (1.9 km) section of the East–West Expressway was opened between Cloverdale Avenue and Main Street. Because of the novelty, local newspapers ran a series of stories and diagrams on how to use the expressway, educating the public on how on-ramps and off-ramps work. Designated as I-40, the expressway soon ran concurrently with US 158 in 1959, from Stratford Road to Marshall (westbound) and Cherry (eastbound) streets. In 1960, the expressway was extended west to at NC 801 near the Yadkin River, and east to Reidsville Road. In 1961, US 421 was rerouted from Pfafftown and downtown Winston-Salem onto new freeway that connected directly with the expressway, then continued easterly running concurrently with I-40. In 1962, US 158 was realigned to continue along the expressway to Reidsville Road, its former alignment became US 158 Business (decommissioned in 1970). East of Reidsville Road, I-40 was extended to the existing Kernersville expressway, where it then linked with the second built section of I-40 (late 1958) and continued towards Greensboro.

=== Interstate 40 Business ===
Interstate 40 Business
- Location: Winston-Salem–Colfax, NC
- Length: 18.5 mi (29.8 km)
- Existed: 1992–2020
- History: Briefly extended through Greensboro in 2008

I-40 Business was established in late 1992, when I-40 was rerouted further south onto a recently opened stretch, which was mostly new construction. The business route spanned from exits 1 to 17 during its tenure, traversing between what was then the western outskirts of Winston-Salem and further east into downtown Winston-Salem and what was then mostly south of Kernersville. The highway continued to serve the overall area of Winston-Salem as the key east-west corridor for the city.

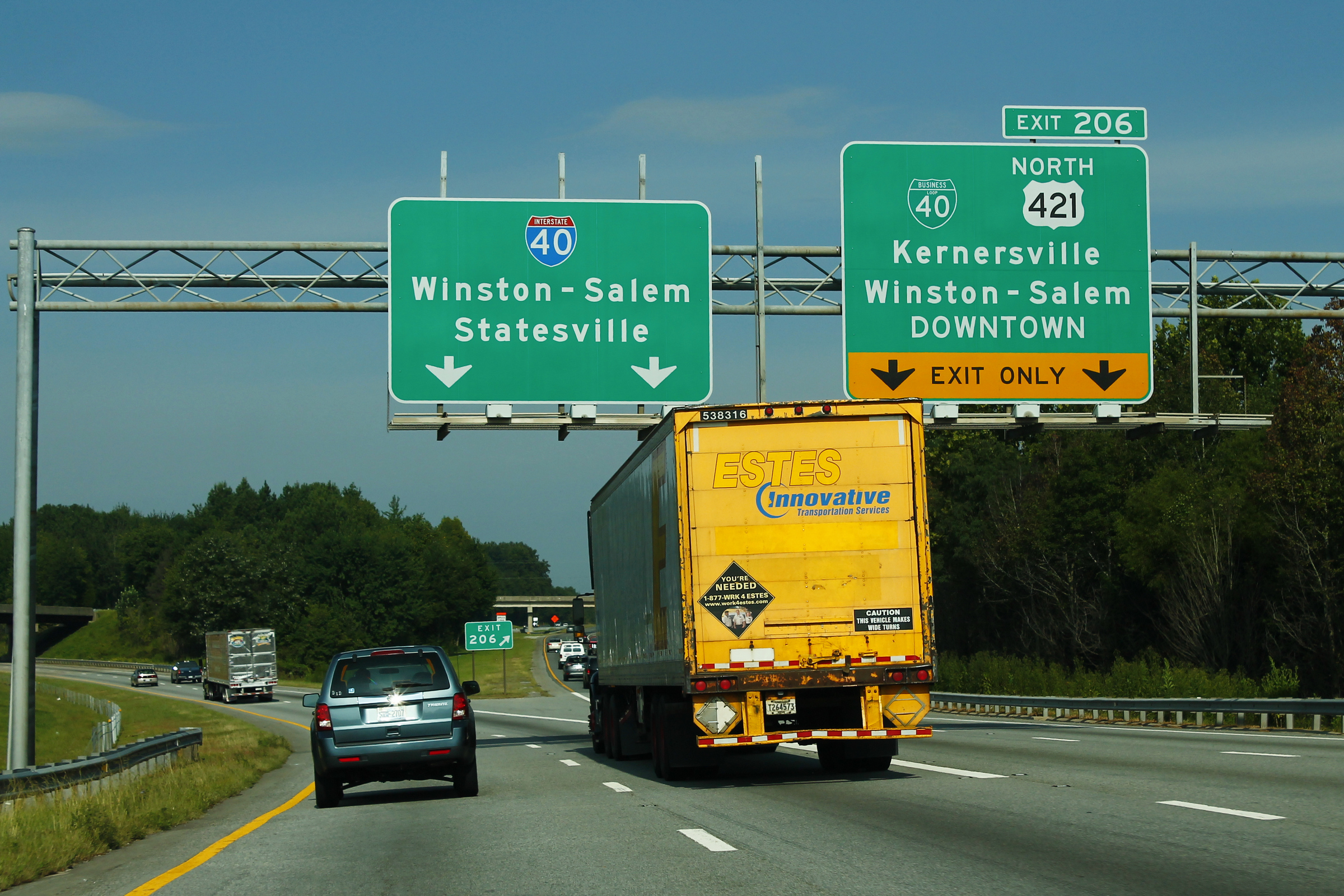
Interstate 40 approaching Interstate 40 Business in Colfax in 2013. "Primary" access to downtown Winston-Salem has been moved to Exit 198 (I-74).

==== Hawthorne Curve ====
Since its opening in 1960, the Hawthorne Curve, a 10° S-curve overpass of Hawthorne Road, became an infamous accident-prone location; which were usually in relation to the speed of the drivers. Cars and trucks would wreck against the curve and, in certain cases, travel along the guardrail and fall 35 feet (11 m) off the overpass. During the time of the construction was the Official Winston-Salem Mayor Marshall Kurfees, who was believed to have ordered the curve to protect political allies who owned businesses on Hawthorne Road and First Street. Mayor Kurfees was extensively blamed for the construction of the curve, and he continued to deny the allegations later on during his life, stating that while the engineers designed it, he had totally lacked direct input on the project. Over the years, several studies were done, and various little fixes were made to address the occurrences, including the implementation of a reduced 45-mile-per-hour (72 km/h) speed zone, more noticeable guardrails, and the installation of blinking lights and flashing warning signs. In January 1998, the first major improvement in 40 years started with the realignment of Hawthorne Curve. At a cost of $26 million, construction lasted for two years, building a new overpass and reshaping the sharp curve to a gentler one. It was completed seven months early in the middle of 2000. As a result of the stretches west of the Curve actually being of current-day Interstate Highway standards; most of the stretch was also heavily upgraded during the 1990s, which included the replacement of the original concrete stretch with asphalt to blend with the then-recently under-reconstruction stretches of I-40 in Clemmons. Most of the bridges directly west and east of Downtown Winston-Salem, were either replaced or renovated between the 1990s to mid 2010s.

==== Brief Greensboro extension ====
In February 2008, I-40 was rerouted south of most of the Greensboro city limits, forming the south stretch of Greensboro Urban Loop. The previous route, which went miles south of downtown Greensboro, became the extension of I-40 Business. This also included the six-mile (9.7 km) hidden concurrency along I-40/US 421, between exits 206 and 212. This extended the route 20 miles (32 km), ending at a new terminus with I-85/I-40, in the vicinity of McLeansville.

However, NCDOT officials received several complaints from residents and motorists about the confusion between the new I-40 and I-40 Business. Another issue was that funding for future construction and repairs on the old route was slashed since it was no longer designated as a primary Interstate. On September 12, 2008, with permission from the FHWA, I-40 was moved back to its old route through Greensboro, decommissioning Business 40.

==== Kernersville ====
While the I-40 Business designation had been in effect for over 20 years during this period, there had been long-term planning for the need to reconfigure one of the earliest exits on the route. In the town of Kernersville, the half interchange with Mountain Street (exit 16), was the former eastern terminus of the then-new US 421 "Bypass." This junction had been considered to be substandard during the previous set of decades and was directly east of the NC 66/150 exit (exit 15). The need to address this was aligned with another highway project nearby, the Kernersville Loop. Construction began in June 2013 on the first phase of a project to extend Macy Grove Road around the east side of Kernersville. Macy Grove Road, which previously crossed over Business 40 with no interchange and had its northern terminus at the at-grade intersection with Old Greensboro Road, was upgraded to expressway standards and extended to a temporary terminus with the one quadrant interchange with East Mountain Street, and the southern terminus of the expressway being at the recent-day designed diamond interchange, built connecting Macy Grove Road to Business 40. This was completed and opened in May 2015, which replaced the previous partial interchange with East Mountain Street directly east of what was then the NC 66/NC 150 interchange, in which the partial interchange was closed and demolished, with the westbound roadway over in the vicinity of the interchange, being rebuilt to be realigned closer to the eastbound roadway. In October 2020, NC 150 was removed from its concurrency with NC 66 through downtown Kernersville, and rerouted onto the Macy Grove Road east of downtown, as the route was further extended to limited access standards, to its recent intersection with North Main Street, which allowed NC 150 to run concurrently with US 421 for around one mile (1.6 km) further east.While not directly related; the Salisbury Road bridge over Business 40 was rebuilt during this period, tailoring to downtown Kernersville, while the bridges at South Main Street and NC 66 were rebuilt in the early-to-mid 1990s.

=== Salem Parkway ===
In 2006, the North Carolina Department of Transportation (NCDOT) commenced the rebuilding of the stretch between Fourth Street and Church Street, which covers most of the original 1.2-mile-long (1.9 km) section of the East–West Expressway from 1958. For the next ten years, NCDOT conducted several studies and a series of public meetings before awarding a design-build contract with Flatiron Constructors, Inc./Blythe Development Company Joint Venture and HDR Engineering, Inc., in September 2016, to complete the final design and construct the project. Considered a $100 million do-over, the project included: replacing the existing roadway pavement, modernizing entrance and exit ramps, replacing nine vehicular bridges, adding two pedestrian bridges, lengthening the acceleration and deceleration lanes between ramps, and widening existing roadway shoulders and adding new ones.

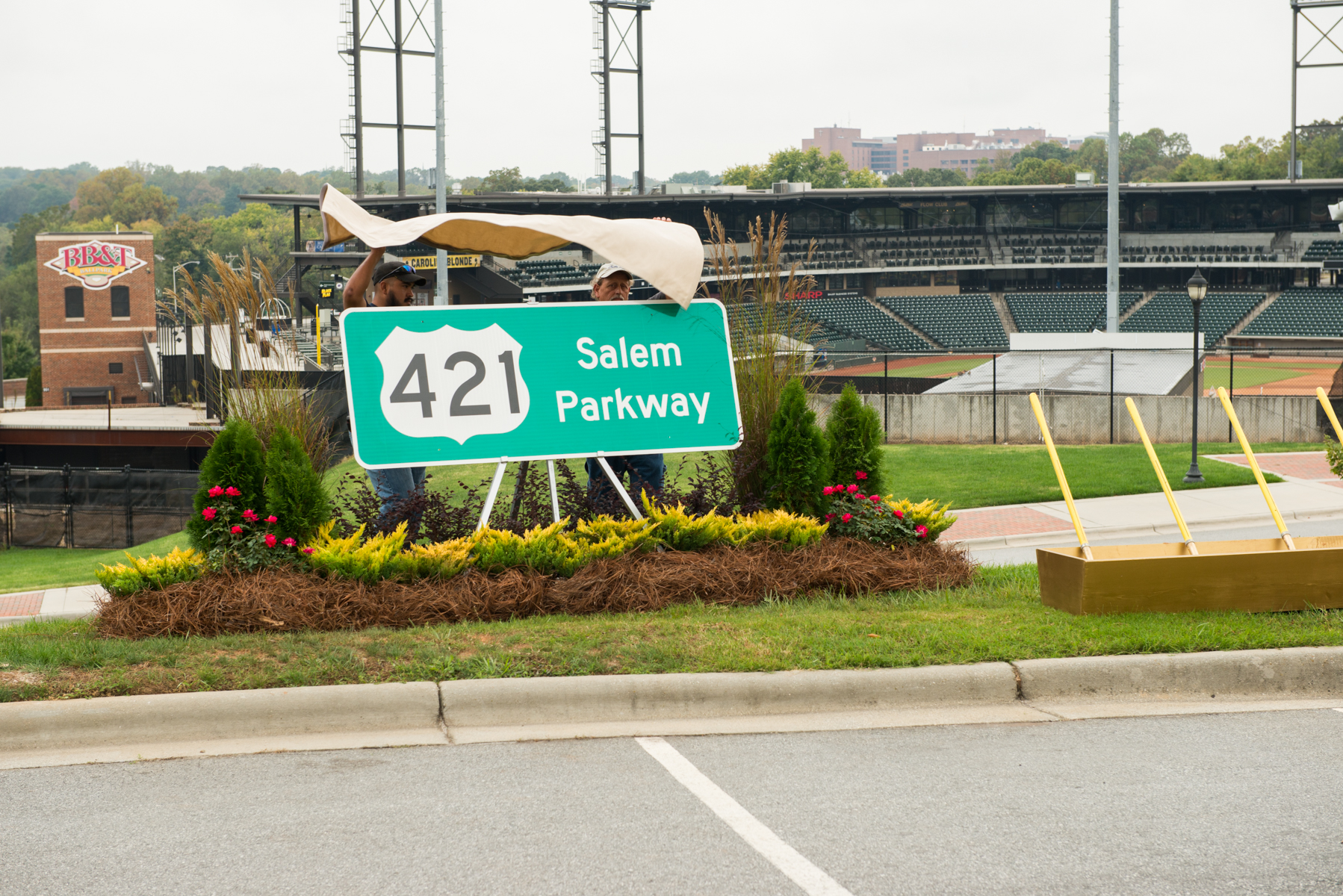
Salem Parkway unveiling

NCDOT had also decided that once construction was completed, I-40 Business would be decommissioned and a new name would be given to the route, alongside the existing US 421 designation. The rationale was the continued confusion locals and travelers have between I-40 and I-40 Business. In November 2015, the residents of the Winston-Salem metro area were allowed to submit a nomination for a new name, with a January 30, 2016, deadline. A selection committee, which included appointees from Winston-Salem and Kernersville, whittled the list to just four for another public vote. The eventual four finalist names were: Golden Leaf Parkway, alluding to the region's tobacco-growing and processing heritage; Innovation Highway, showing the high-tech aspirations of the area; Piedmont Corridor, identifying geographic location in a highly developed part of the state, and Salem Parkway, which refers to the Moravian settlement founded in 1766. On October 21, 2016, Governor Pat McCrory announced, at the project's ground breaking event, the new name, which had been chosen to be the Salem Parkway; which was the overwhelming favorite, receiving 53% of the vote. Interstate 40 Business remained the designation of the freeway during the rest of the 2010s. Salem Parkway billing, took place when the highway reopened on February 2, 2020, though new signs would show the Salem Parkway name once installed, with new signage outside of the project area having had been changed in late December 2019.

==== Downtown reconstruction ====
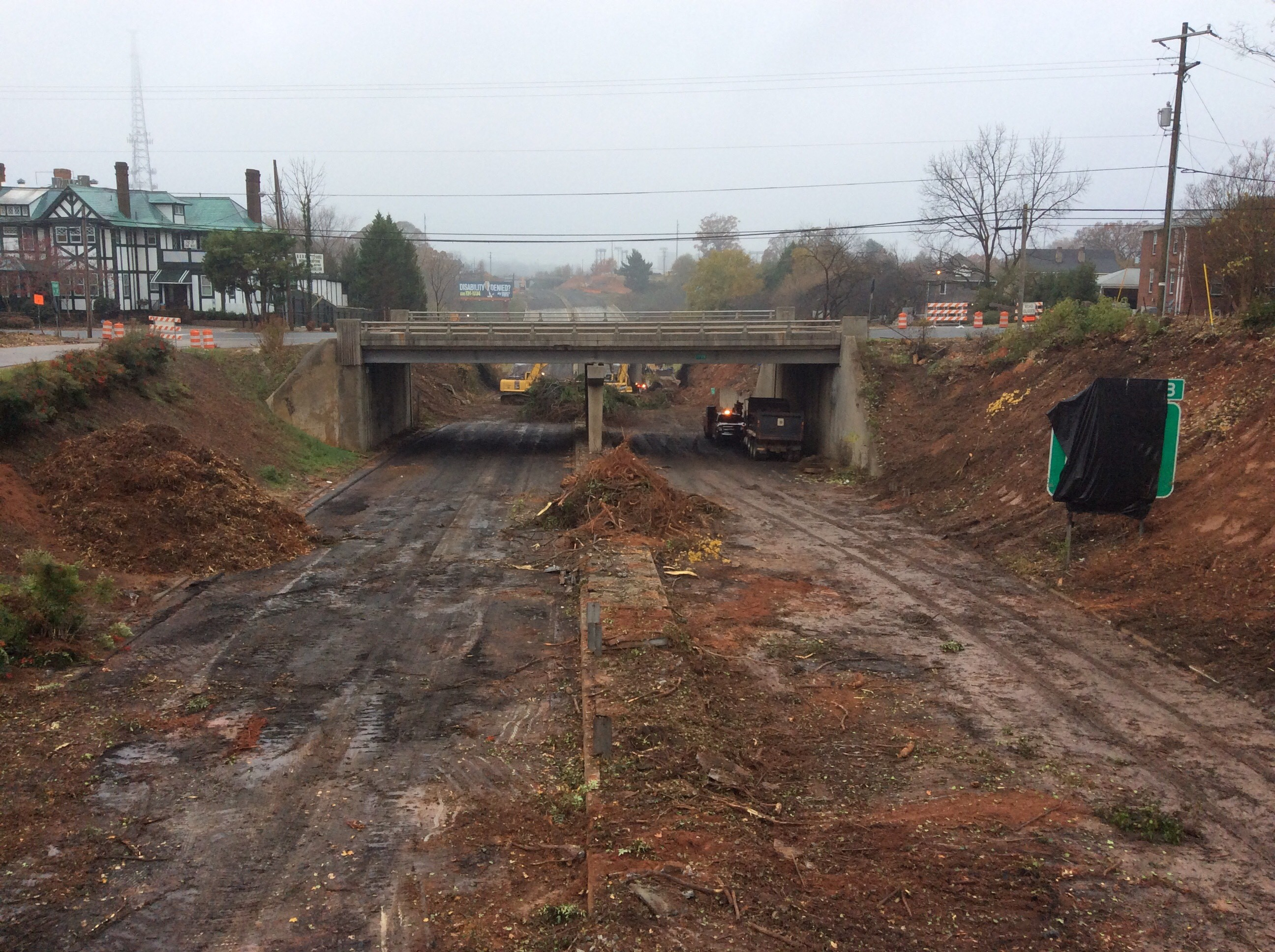
On the first day of closure, work began on the Broad Street bridge

The first phase of construction was focused on and around Peters Creek Parkway (NC 150), which included lowering the roadway to establish a minimum vertical clearance of 17 feet (5.2 m) at the new Fourth Street two-lane bridge and 17.5 feet (5.3 m) at the new seven-lane Peters Creek Parkway bridge. After two years of intermittent closures, the new Peters Creek Parkway bridge was opened on November 12, 2018. On November 17, the second phase began with the complete shutdown of Business 40 between Peters Creek Parkway and John Gold Memorial Expressway (US 52/US 311/NC 8); three alternate routes were set up through the downtown area for locals while travelers are encouraged to remain on mainline I-40.

During construction, Business 40 was lowered to establish a minimum vertical clearance of 17 feet (5.2 m) for the new Marshall, Cherry, Main, and Church Street bridges; Spruce Street bridge was removed, and Liberty Street changed from an underpass to an overpass as a result. The Broad Street interchange was permanently closed and removed; the Cherry Street interchange would have been modified with Marshall Street, and the Main Street interchange was modified to have only a southbound on-ramp and a northbound off-ramp. Two pedestrian bridges would also be completed, one of which would replace Green Street Bridge, and a Strollway Bridge adjacent to Liberty Street.

On August 30, 2019, the section east of Main Street was opened. Reconstruction of the downtown segment was completed February 2, 2020. The name change went into effect on the day the parkway reopened. The Twin City Trail opened in August 2025, which coincided with the adjacent sidewalks that were built along the downtown stretch, in which the sidewalks were completed in 2020-2021.

== Exit list ==
Exit numbers follow US 421 mileage. Old exit numbers and closed exits are based on the former I-40 Business exits.

County	Location	mi	km	Old exit	New exit	Destinations	Notes
Guilford	Colfax	18.50	29.77	—	—	I-40 east / US 421 south (Fordham Boulevard) – Greensboro	Continuation as I-40 / US 421
Forsyth	Kernersville	16.56	26.65	17	221	NC 150 east (Macy Grove Road)	East end of NC 150 overlap
Forsyth	Kernersville	15.60	25.11	16	—	Mountain Street – Colfax	Permanently closed as of May 2015
Forsyth	Kernersville			15	222	NC 66 – Kernersville, Walkertown	
Forsyth	Kernersville	13.84	22.27	14	224	South Main Street – Kernersville	
Forsyth	Kernersville	11.66	18.76	—	227	I-74 – Wytheville, High Point	Signed as Exits 227A (east) [Opened on September 19, 2026] and 227B (west) [Opened on September 5, 2020]
Forsyth	Winston-Salem	9.66	15.55	10	228	Linville Road	
Forsyth	Winston-Salem	7.86	12.65	8	230	US 158 east (Reidsville Road) – Walkertown, Reidsville	East end of US 158 overlap; southbound exit and northbound entrance
Forsyth	Winston-Salem	6.97	11.22	7	231	Lowery Street / Fifth Street	Northbound Fifth Street, southbound Lowery Street
Forsyth	Winston-Salem	5.88	9.46	6C	232A	Martin Luther King Jr. Drive – Winston-Salem State University	
Forsyth	Winston-Salem	5.61	9.03	6A-B	232B-C	US 52 / NC 8 (John Gold Memorial Expressway) – Mount Airy, Airport, Lexington	To Old Salem, UNC School of the Arts; Signed as Exit 232B (north) and 232C (south). US 52 exits 109A-B
Forsyth	Winston-Salem	5.00	8.05	5D	233A	Main Street	Northbound exit and southbound entrance
Forsyth	Winston-Salem	4.81	7.74	5C	233B	Cherry Street / Marshall Street – Convention Center	
Forsyth	Winston-Salem	4.51	7.26	5B	—	Broad Street	Permanently closed as of November 2018
Forsyth	Winston-Salem	4.16	6.69	5A	234A	NC 150 west (Peters Creek Parkway) – Truist Stadium	West end of NC 150 overlap
Forsyth	Winston-Salem	3.79	6.10	4B	234B	West First Street / Hawthorne Road	Northbound exit and Southbound entrance
Forsyth	Winston-Salem	3.45	5.55	4A	234C	Cloverdale Avenue	
Forsyth	Winston-Salem	2.88	4.63	3B-C	235	US 158 west (Stratford Road)	West end of US 158 overlap; signed Exit 235A (Stratford Road north) and 235B (US 158 west/Stratford Road south) from northbound Salem Parkway
Forsyth	Winston-Salem	2.42	3.89	3A	236	Knollwood Street	
Forsyth	Winston-Salem	1.63	2.62	2A-B	237	NC 67 (Silas Creek Parkway) – Wake Forest University, LJVM Coliseum, Forsyth Tech	Signed as Exits 237A (west) and 237B (east)
Forsyth	Winston-Salem	0.00	0.00	1	238	I-40 – Greensboro, Statesville	Northbound left exit
Forsyth	Winston-Salem	0.00	0.00	—	—	US 421 north – Yadkinville	Continuation as US 421
1.000 mi = 1.609 km; 1.000 km = 0.621 mi: Closed/former; Concurrency terminus; Incomplete access
