= Union Cross, North Carolina =

- Unincorporated community
- Location within North Carolina Location within the United States
- Coordinates: 36°02′54″N 80°07′08″W
- Country: United States
- State: North Carolina
- County: Forsyth
- Elevation: 978 ft (298 m)
- Time zone: UTC-5 (Eastern (EST))
  - Summer (DST): UTC-4 (EDT)
- ZIP code: 27107, 27284
- Area code: 336
- FIPS code: 37-37067
- GNIS feature ID: 1023037

Union Cross is an unincorporated community in southeastern Forsyth County, North Carolina, United States. As of 2026, most of the community is annexed into Kernersville, with the south and west outskirts of community being annexed inside the southeastern outskirts of Winston-Salem, in result of the population growth of the area and the construction of the Dell plant. The community holds Union Cross Traditional Academy, as well as Glenn High School.

== Geography ==
The center of Union Cross is located at 36°02′54″N 80°07′07″W (36.048470 -80.118933). It is located southeast of Winston-Salem at the intersection of High Point Road, and Union Cross Road, north of Interstate 74. Its elevation is 978 feet (298 m).
