= National Register of Historic Places listings in Rockingham County, North Carolina =

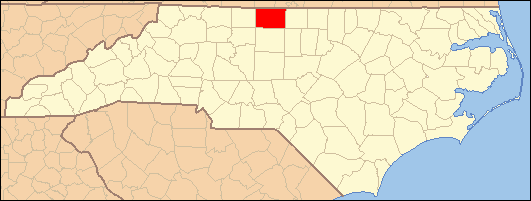

This list includes properties and districts listed on the National Register of Historic Places in Rockingham County, North Carolina. Click the "Map of all coordinates" link to the right to view an online map of all properties and districts with latitude and longitude coordinates in the table below.

== Current listings ==
This National Park Service list is complete through NPS recent listings posted April 10, 2026.

	Name on the Register	Image	Date listed	Location	City or town	Description
1	Academy Street Historic District	Academy Street Historic District	July 15, 1982 (#82003502)	Academy St. 36°23′07″N 79°57′39″W	Madison	
2	Boone Road Historic District		August 31, 1987 (#87001455)	Roughly 400 and 500 blocks of Boone Rd., 400 blk. of Chestnut and 500 blk. Glovenia Sts., and 200 blk. of Highland Dr. 36°29′48″N 79°45′40″W	Eden	
3	The Boxwoods	The Boxwoods	May 28, 1980 (#80002898)	Penn Lane; 36°22′55″N 79°57′46″W	Madison	
4	Bullard-Ray House		June 11, 1982 (#82003501)	650 Washington St. 36°29′25″N 79°45′51″W	Eden	
5	Cascade Plantation		October 14, 1975 (#75001288)	NE of Eden off NC 770; 36°31′22″N 79°39′29″W	Eden	
6	Central Leaksville Historic District	Central Leaksville Historic District	December 9, 1986 (#86003376)	Roughly bounded by Lindsay, Monroe, Jay, Washington, and Kemp Sts. 36°29′31″N 79°46′05″W	Eden	
7	Chinqua-Penn Plantation	Chinqua-Penn Plantation	April 8, 1993 (#93000235)	NC 1998 N side, 0.2 miles W of jct. with NC 1987; 36°23′04″N 79°42′00″W	Reidsville	
8	Cross Rock Rapid Sluice		March 19, 1984 (#84002459)	Address Restricted	Madison	
9	Dead Timber Ford Sluices		June 29, 1984 (#84002455)	Address Restricted	Wentworth	
10	Dempsey-Reynolds-Taylor House	Dempsey-Reynolds-Taylor House	September 8, 1983 (#83001910)	610 Henry St. 36°29′29″N 79°45′57″W	Eden	
11	Eagle Falls Sluice		March 19, 1984 (#84002462)	Address Restricted	Wentworth	
12	Fewell-Reynolds House	Fewell-Reynolds House	July 16, 1979 (#79003349)	Address Restricted	Madison	
13	First Baptist Church	First Baptist Church	March 22, 1989 (#89000178)	538 Greenwood St. 36°29′43″N 79°45′50″W	Eden	
14	First Baptist Church	First Baptist Church	December 11, 1986 (#86003386)	401 S. Scales St. 36°21′26″N 79°39′52″W	Reidsville	
15	Former Reidsville High School	Former Reidsville High School	January 21, 1994 (#93001540)	116 N. Franklin St. 36°21′46″N 79°40′14″W	Reidsville	
16	Gravel Shoals Sluice		March 19, 1984 (#84002458)	Address Restricted	Madison	
17	High Rock Farm		April 26, 1974 (#74001373)	Southeast of Reidsville on SR 2619; 36°15′36″N 79°34′00″W	Williamsburg	
18	Jacob's Creek Landing		March 19, 1984 (#84002522)	Address Restricted	Madison	
19	Jennings-Baker House	Jennings-Baker House	March 12, 1987 (#86003387)	608 Vance St. 36°21′19″N 79°40′42″W	Reidsville	
20	Dr. Franklin King House-Idlewild	Dr. Franklin King House-Idlewild	September 19, 1985 (#85002415)	700 blk. of Bridge St. 36°29′26″N 79°45′40″W	Eden	
21	Leaksville Commercial Historic District	Leaksville Commercial Historic District	October 23, 1987 (#87001422)	622-656 Washington & 634 Monroe Sts. 36°29′25″N 79°45′51″W	Eden	
22	Leaksville-Spray Institute		March 9, 1989 (#89000179)	609 College St. 36°29′35″N 79°45′34″W	Eden	
23	Lower Sauratown Plantation		October 11, 1984 (#84000071)	Address Restricted	Eden	
24	Mayo River Sluice		March 19, 1984 (#84002466)	Address Restricted	Madison	
25	Mayodan Historic District	Mayodan Historic District	August 15, 2016 (#16000222)	Roughly bounded by West Adams St., North and South Second Ave., and North and South Third Ave. 36°24′43″N 79°58′00″W	Mayodan	
26	Reuben Wallace McCollum House	Reuben Wallace McCollum House	May 1, 2003 (#03000341)	2203 S. Scales St. 36°18′52″N 79°40′13″W	Reidsville	
27	Mt. Sinai Baptist Church	Mt. Sinai Baptist Church	June 25, 1987 (#87000914)	512 Henry St. 36°29′38″N 79°46′07″W	Eden	
28	North Washington Avenue Workers' House	North Washington Avenue Workers' House	December 11, 1986 (#86003388)	Eastern side of the 300 block of N. Washington Ave. 36°21′55″N 79°40′17″W	Reidsville	
29	Penn House	Penn House	November 25, 1983 (#83003992)	324 Maple Ave. 36°21′27″N 79°40′09″W	Reidsville	
30	Gov. David S. Reid House	Gov. David S. Reid House	April 26, 1974 (#74001374)	219 SE Market St. 36°21′36″N 79°39′46″W	Reidsville	
31	Reidsville Historic District	Reidsville Historic District	March 12, 1987 (#86003391)	Roughly bounded by W. Morehead, Southern Railway tracks, Lawson Ave., Main, Piedmontg, Vance and Lindsey Sts. 36°21′23″N 79°40′00″W	Reidsville	
32	Richardson Houses Historic District	Richardson Houses Historic District	December 11, 1986 (#86003390)	Northwestern side of Richardson Dr. between Coach Rd. and Woodland Dr. 36°20′31″N 79°40′58″W	Reidsville	
33	Roberson's Fish Trap Shoal Sluice		March 19, 1984 (#84002468)	Address Restricted	Madison	
34	Rockingham County Courthouse	Rockingham County Courthouse	May 10, 1979 (#79001748)	Highway 65; 36°23′52″N 79°46′16″W	Wentworth	
35	Alfred Moore Scales Law Office	Alfred Moore Scales Law Office	April 29, 1982 (#82003503)	307 Carter St. 36°23′23″N 79°57′52″W	Madison	
36	Site 31RK1		May 24, 1984 (#84002474)	Southern side of the Dan River, southeast of Eden; 36°29′23″N 79°42′39″W	Eden	
37	Slink Shoal Sluice and Wing Dams		March 19, 1984 (#84002475)	Address Restricted	Madison	
38	Spray Industrial Historic District	Spray Industrial Historic District	December 9, 1986 (#86003371)	Roughly bounded by Warehouse, Rhode Island, River Dr., Washburn Rd., the Smith River, E. Early Ave., and Church; 36°30′39″N 79°45′22″W	Eden	
39	St. Luke's Episcopal Church	St. Luke's Episcopal Church	March 17, 1989 (#89000177)	604 Morgan Rd. 36°31′01″N 79°45′39″W	Eden	
40	Tanyard Shoal Sluice		March 19, 1984 (#84002478)	Address Restricted	Eden	
41	Three Ledges Shoal Sluice		March 19, 1984 (#84002481)	Address Restricted	Eden	
42	Troublesome Creek Ironworks		September 29, 1972 (#72000989)	Address Restricted	Monroeton	
43	Washington Mills-Mayodan Plant	Washington Mills-Mayodan Plant	April 20, 2005 (#05000319)	7801 NC 35; 36°24′32″N 79°57′57″W	Mayodan	
44	Wentworth Methodist Episcopal Church and Cemetery	Wentworth Methodist Episcopal Church and Cemetery	March 13, 1986 (#86000391)	North Carolina Highway 65 west of SR 2124; 36°24′03″N 79°46′40″W	Wentworth	
45	Wide Mouth Shoal Sluice		March 19, 1984 (#84002484)	Address Restricted	Eden	
46	Wright Tavern	Wright Tavern	September 15, 1970 (#70000467)	NC 65; 36°23′54″N 79°46′13″W	Wentworth	

== See also ==
- National Register of Historic Places listings in North Carolina
- List of National Historic Landmarks in North Carolina
