= Reynolds House =

Reynolds House, and variations, may refer to:

- Parker-Reynolds House, Anniston, Alabama, listed on the National Register of Historic Places (NRHP) in Calhoun County
- Nelson House (Latham, Alabama), also known as the Reynolds House
- James Culbertson Reynolds House, Monticello, Indiana
- Joseph "Diamond Jo" Reynolds Office Building and House, McGregor, Iowa, NRHP-listed in Clayton County
- Anson O. Reynolds House, Des Moines, Iowa
- Charles B. Reynolds Round Barn, Doon, Iowa
- Isaac N. Reynolds House, Eaton Rapids, Michigan
- James Reynolds House, Cape Girardeau, Missouri
- Reynolds–Scherman House, Bernardsville, New Jersey, NRHP-listed in Somerset County
- Barela-Reynolds House, Mesilla, New Mexico, listed on the NRHP
- George Reynolds House, Cape Vincent, New York
- Breese-Reynolds House, Hoosick, New York
- Reynolds House (Poughkeepsie, New York)
- Reynolds House (Asheville, North Carolina)
- Dr. Carl V. Reynolds House, Asheville, North Carolina
- Dempsey-Reynolds-Taylor House, Eden, North Carolina
- Fewell-Reynolds House, Madison, North Carolina
- James E. Reynolds House, Cameron, Oklahoma
- John R. Reynolds House, Dayton, Ohio, NRHP-listed in Dayton
- Baldwin-Reynolds House, Meadville, Pennsylvania, listed on the NRHP
- Reynolds-Morris House, Philadelphia, Pennsylvania
- Joseph Reynolds House, Bristol, Rhode Island
- Grant J. Reynolds House, Sioux Falls, South Dakota, NRHP-listed in Minnehaha County
- Reynolds-Seaquist House, Mason, Texas, NRHP-listed in Mason County
- Henry T. and Rebecca Reynolds House, Springville, Utah
- John T. and Henry T. Reynolds, Jr., House, Springville, Utah
- Reynolds Homestead, Critz, Virginia
- Reynolds-Weed House, Elkhorn, Wisconsin
