= WCBQ =

Radio station in Oxford, North Carolina, US

Simulcast with WHNC in Henderson
- Oxford, North Carolina; United States
- Frequency: 1340 kHz

Programming
- Format: Gospel

Ownership
- Owner: The Paradise Network (TPN) of North Carolina, Inc.

History
- First air date: June 5, 1949
- Former call signs: WOXF (1949–1973)

Technical information
- Licensing authority: FCC
- Facility ID: 54594
- Class: C
- Power: 1,000 watts
- Transmitter coordinates: 36°18′26.9″N 78°34′25.3″W

Links
- Public license information: Public file; LMS
- Website: wcbq-whnc-am.godaddysites.com

WCBQ (1340 AM) is a radio station broadcasting a gospel music format in Oxford, North Carolina, United States. The station is owned by The Paradise Network and broadcasts from a facility on Henderson Street east of central Oxford.

== History ==
This station began broadcasting as WOXF on June 5, 1949. It was owned by the Oxford Broadcasting Corporation, which had received the construction permit from the Federal Communications Commission (FCC) for the 250-watt radio station on September 8, 1948. Its owners, two men from Durham and Tarboro, sold the station in 1955 to manager James F. Flanagan and the Ledger Publishing Company, which published the local newspaper Oxford Public Ledger. The station moved its studios to a site near the newspaper in 1957.

WOXF was sold in 1973 to Radio Granville, Inc., and changed its call sign to WCBQ on May 1 of that year. The call sign matched WCBX in Eden, which Childers owned and managed. Ownership turned over again in 1976, this time to F. Roger Page, Jr., and Al Woodlief. For more than 15 years under Woodlief ownership, WCBQ broadcast an automated country music format. After Al Woodlief retired from station management in 1992 as a result of his multiple sclerosis, his wife Anita began running WCBQ and switched it to gospel music on August 31, dropping most of the sports broadcasts that were being carried at that time. In 1994, WCBQ expanded when the Woodliefs acquired WHNC (890 AM) in Henderson, which ceased its automated oldies format to simulcast WCBQ on a full-time basis. The Woodliefs sold WCBQ and WHNC in 2001 to The Paradise Network, a Black-owned firm based in Washington, D.C. The owner, Alvin Jones, broadened the stations' format by adding more high school sports coverage, daytime blocks of oldies music, The Radio Factor with Bill O'Reilly, and overnight smooth jazz. In the meantime, The Paradise Network accumulated legal troubles. The FCC fined it $18,000 for failing to maintain Emergency Alert System equipment or a public inspection file and another $7,000 for broadcasting with too much power at night. Paradise had not paid the American Society of Composers, Authors and Publishers (ASCAP) for its licenses since 2002, and as a result in 2004 the stations lost the ability to play ASCAP-represented songs but did so anyway. Eleven music publishers sued in 2006, claiming WCBQ and WHNC had played their songs in 2004 despite not being current with ASCAP. A federal judge fined Paradise in December 2006.

Paradise agreed to sell WCBQ and WHNC to The Raftt Corporation of Texas in August 2007. At the time, Paradise still owed the Woodliefs $300,000 on the 2001 purchase of the stations.
