= Academy Street Historic District =

Academy Street Historic District may refer to:

- Academy Street Historic District (Madison, North Carolina), listed on the National Register of Historic Places (NRHP) in Rockingham County, North Carolina
- Academy Street Historic District (Poughkeepsie, New York), NRHP-listed
