= WHNC =

Radio station in Henderson, North Carolina

Simulcast of WCBQ in Oxford, North Carolina
- Henderson, North Carolina; United States
- Frequency: 890 kHz

Programming
- Format: Gospel
- Affiliations: Westwood One

Ownership
- Owner: The Paradise Network (TPN) of North Carolina, Inc.

History
- First air date: June 5, 1945
- Call sign meaning: Henderson, North Carolina

Technical information
- Licensing authority: FCC
- Facility ID: 56373
- Class: D
- Power: 1,000 watts
- Transmitter coordinates: 36°20′8.5″N 78°22′10″W

Links
- Public license information: Public file; LMS
- Website: wcbq-whnc-am.godaddysites.com

WHNC (890 AM) is a radio station in Henderson, North Carolina, United States, broadcasting a gospel music format. It is owned by The Paradise Network and simulcasts WCBQ (1340 AM) in Oxford.

== History ==
On May 17, 1944, the Henderson Radio Corporation applied for authority to build a new 250-watt, daytime-only radio station on 890 kHz in Henderson, North Carolina. The firm had been incorporated by S. S. Stevenson and T. W. McCracken of Henderson and Nathan Frank of Roanoke Rapids. A construction permit was awarded on December 12, and WHNC began broadcasting on June 5 with programming from the Mutual Broadcasting System. Its transmitter site was located two miles north of town. Some of the original equipment was transported to North Carolina and the original studio on William Street from a defunct radio station in Arizona. In 1948, the company received a construction permit to build a companion FM station, WHNC-FM.

A new studio was built in 1952, burned in a January 1956 fire that destroyed the transmitter, and reopened three months later. Frank became the sole owner in 1953 and sold WHNC-AM-FM in 1971 to the Beasley Broadcast Group. Beasley sold WHNC and the FM, then renamed WXNC, to Rigel, Inc. in 1978; a minority stake in the new ownership was held by the stations' general manager. WXNC was sold off in 1981 to the Bible Broadcasting Network and became WYFL. Rigel sold WHNC in 1994 to the Woodlief family, owner of WCBQ (1340 AM) in nearby Oxford. At the time, WHNC—which had been airing an automated oldies format—began simulcasting WCBQ on a full-time basis and shut down its local operation. The Woodliefs sold WCBQ and WHNC in 2001 to The Paradise Network, a Black-owned firm based in Washington, D.C. The owner, Alvin Jones, broadened the stations' format by adding more high school sports coverage, daytime blocks of oldies music, The Radio Factor with Bill O'Reilly, and overnight smooth jazz. In the meantime, The Paradise Network accumulated legal troubles. The FCC fined it $18,000 for failing to maintain Emergency Alert System equipment or a public inspection file and another $7,000 for broadcasting with too much power at night. Paradise had not paid the American Society of Composers, Authors and Publishers (ASCAP) for its licenses since 2002, and as a result in 2004 the stations lost the ability to play ASCAP-represented songs but did so anyway. Eleven music publishers sued in 2006, claiming WCBQ and WHNC had played their songs in 2004 despite not being current with ASCAP. A federal judge fined Paradise in December 2006.

Paradise agreed to sell WCBQ and WHNC to The Raftt Corporation of Texas in August 2007. At the time, Paradise still owed the Woodliefs $300,000 on the 2001 purchase of the stations.
