= Edwin Wilson (academic) =

American academic of English literature (1923–2024)

- Born: Edwin Graves Wilson; February 1, 1923; Leaksville, North Carolina, U.S.
- Died: March 13, 2024 (aged 101)
- Education: Wake Forest University (BA); Harvard University (A.M., Ph.D.)
- Occupation: English literary academic
- Known for: Professor and administrator at Wake Forest University (1951–1993)
- Spouse: Emily Herring
- Children: 3

Edwin Graves Wilson (February 1, 1923 – March 13, 2024) was an American academic who was a professor of English literature at Wake Forest University. His professional academic and administrative tenure at Wake Forest spanned from 1951 until his retirement in 1993.

Wilson is referred to affectionately by members of the Wake Forest community as "Mr. Wake Forest." He was a 1943 graduate of Wake Forest with a Bachelor of Arts degree in English.

Wilson was born in Leaksville, North Carolina, on February 1, 1923. He graduated from Wake Forest and later served as a U.S. Navy officer in World War II. After his service, he earned a master's degree and a doctorate, both in English, from Harvard University. In 1951, he began teaching English at Wake Forest, where he spent his entire career. His specialty was the Romantic poets - William Wordsworth, Lord Byron, and others, often performing poetic recitations.

In addition to his academic work, Wilson acted in succession as Assistant Dean of the undergraduate College, acting Dean of the College, Dean of the College, Provost (the University's first), Vice President for special projects, and Senior Vice President. His longest-held administrative position was Provost, his role on campus from 1967 until 1990. Wilson also has been active in intercollegiate athletics and is professed lover of ACC men's basketball. He served as Wake Forest's representative to the National Collegiate Athletic Association and to the Atlantic Coast Conference (ACC), as well as president of the ACC. In 1992, prior to his retirement, the university named the new wing of the Z. Smith Reynolds Library in his honor.

Outside the university, Wilson has served on a number of arts-related organizations' boards, including the Piedmont Opera Theatre, the Winston-Salem Arts Council, the North Carolina Arts Council, and Reynolda House Museum of American Art. He has also served on the board of trustees at Winston-Salem State University and is a 2002 recipient of the North Carolina Award for Public Service.

== Personal life and death ==
Wilson was married to Emily Louise Herring, a professor and poet. They had three children.

Wilson turned 100 on February 1, 2023, and died on March 13, 2024, at the age of 101.

== Sources ==
- Hunt, Hannah Kay (2012-06-05). "Class of the Finest". Wake Forest Magazine.
- "Happy Birthday, Ed Wilson!". Social Media @ WFU. 2015-02-02. Archived from the original on 2015-07-03.
- "Happy 90th Birthday, Dr. Wilson!". Wake Forest Historical Museum. 18 July 2013.
