= Boone Road Historic District =

Historic district in North Carolina, United States

- U.S. National Register of Historic Places
- U.S. Historic district
- Location within North Carolina Location within the United States
- Location: Roughly 400 and 500 blocks of Boone Rd., 400 blk. of Chestnut and 500 blk. Glovenia Sts., and 200 blk. of Highland Dr., Eden, North Carolina
- Coordinates: 36°29′48″N 79°45′40″W
- Area: 21.5 acres (8.7 ha)
- Architect: Hopper, J.W.; Et al.
- Architectural style: Late 19th And 20th Century Revivals, Queen Anne, Foursquare;I-House
- NRHP reference No.: 87001455
- Added to NRHP: August 31, 1987

Boone Road Historic District is a national historic district located at Eden, Rockingham County, North Carolina. It encompasses 32 contributing buildings and 1 contributing structure in a residential section of the town of Eden. It was developed from about 1895 to about 1935, and includes notable examples of Queen Anne, American Foursquare, and I-house style architecture. Notable buildings include the Wade-Collins House (c. 1897), Willis-Huggins House, Austin House, Ray-McCallum House, McCollum-Truslow House, Clark House (1919), Knight House (1919), and Claude Jones House.

It was listed on the National Register of Historic Places in 1987.
