= Spray Industrial Historic District =

Historic district in North Carolina, United States

- U.S. National Register of Historic Places
- U.S. Historic district
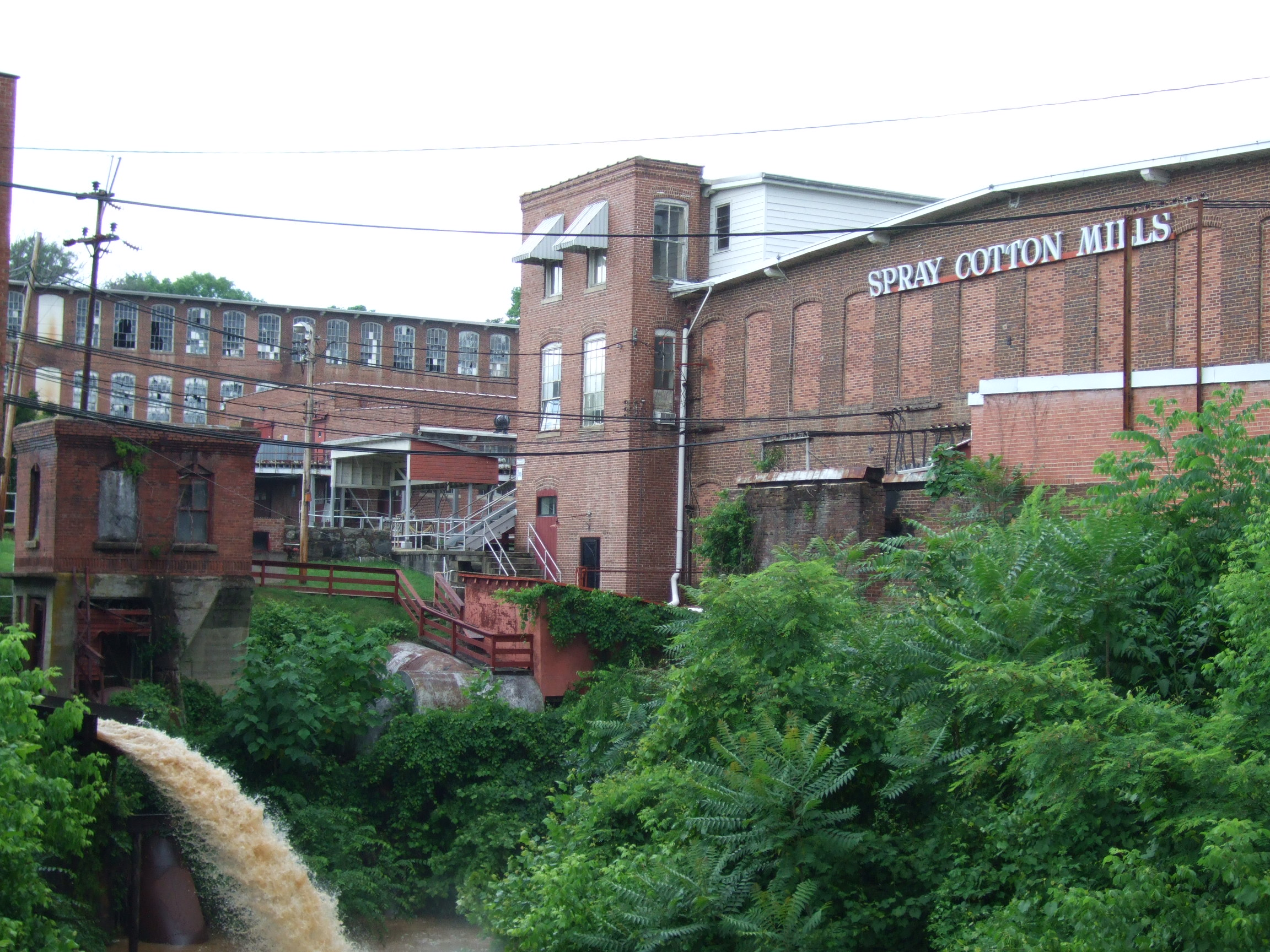
- Spray Cotton Mills Complex

- Location within North Carolina Location within the United States
- Location: Roughly bounded by Warehouse, Rhode Island, River Dr., Washburn Rd., the Smith River, E. Early Ave., and Church, Eden, North Carolina
- Coordinates: 36°30′39″N 79°45′22″W
- Area: 151 acres (61 ha)
- Architect: Biberstein, R.C.; Et al.
- NRHP reference No.: 86003371
- Added to NRHP: December 9, 1986

Spray Industrial Historic District is a national historic district located at Eden, Rockingham County, North Carolina. It encompasses 70 contributing buildings, 9 contributing structures, and 1 contributing object in an industrial section of the town of Eden. It includes buildings associated with eight textile mill complexes, mill village housing, and seven commercial buildings. Notable contributing resources include the Smith River Dam and Spray Power canal, Morehead Cotton Mill complex, "Superintendent's" House (c. 1810), Imperial Bank and Trust Company (1912), Leaksville Cotton Mills complex, Spray Mercantile Building, Spray Cotton Mills complex, Lily Mill complex, Nantucket Mills complex designed by R. C. Biberstein, American Warehouse Company complex, Rhode Island Mill complex, Phillips-Chatham House (c. 1910), and Spray Woolen Mill complex.

It was listed on the National Register of Historic Places in 1986. The main Spray Cotton Mill building was destroyed by fire in January 2023.

== Gallery ==
Manufacturing of blankets at the Carolina Cotton and Woolen Mills Company during World War I
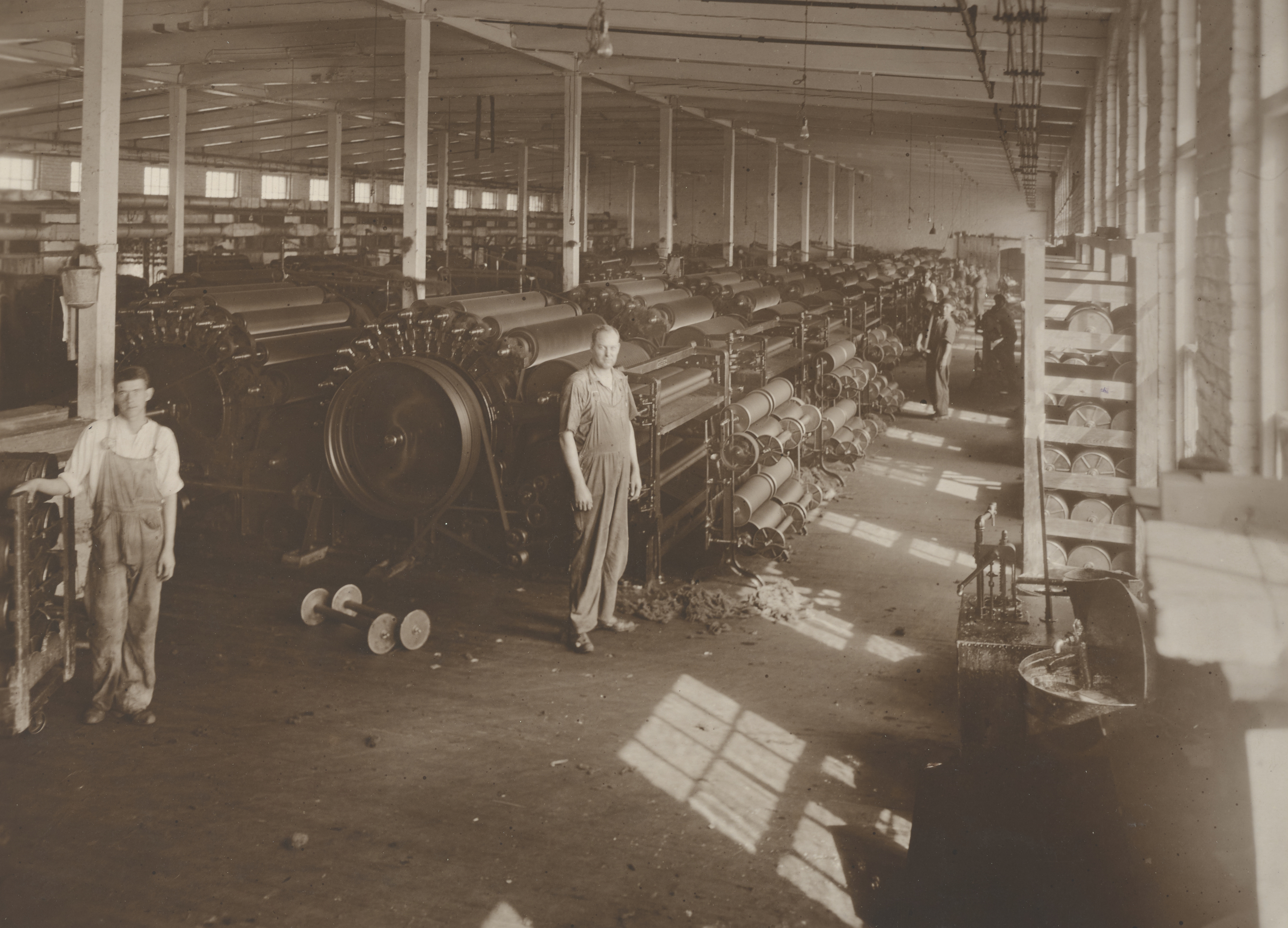
Making blankets

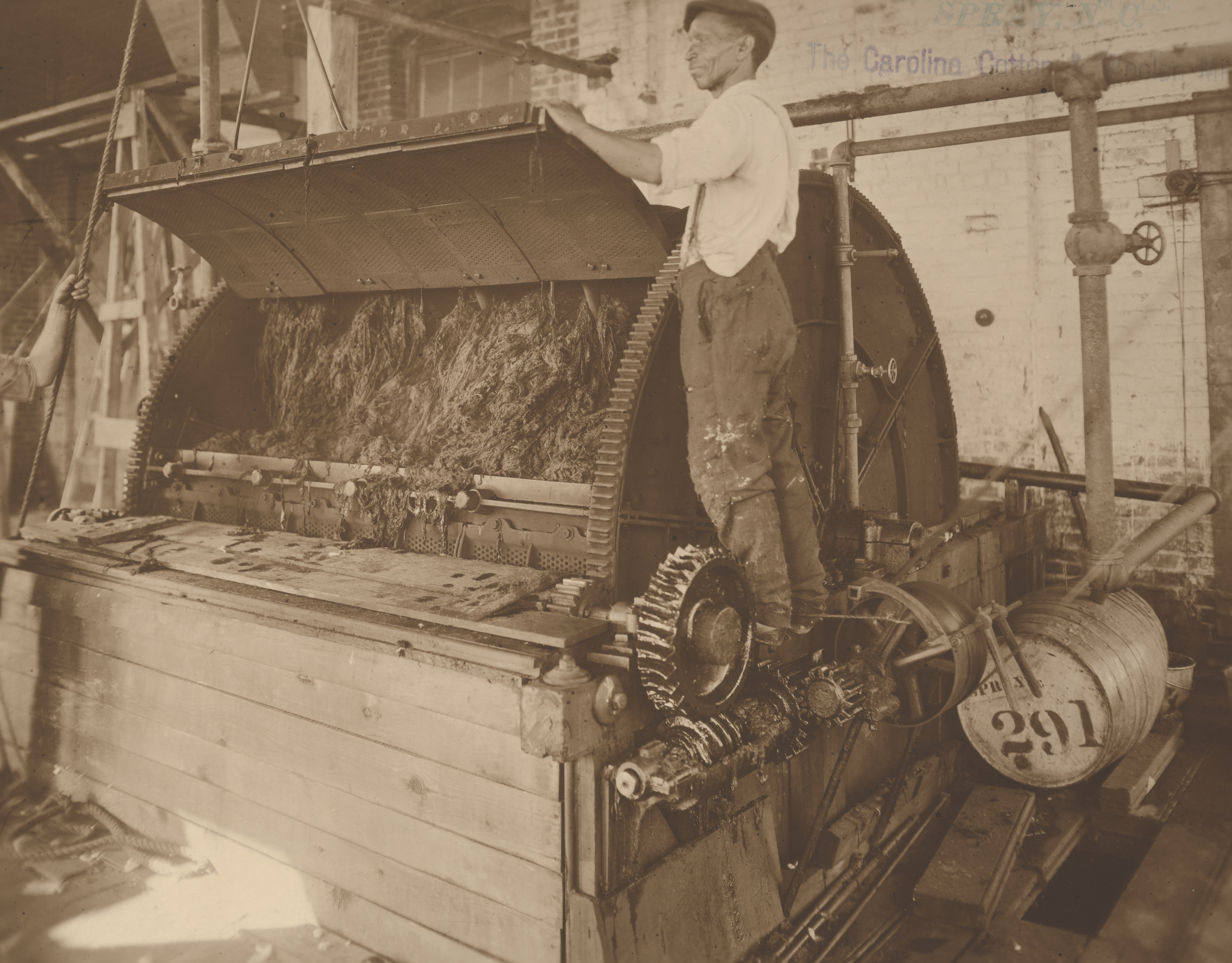
Dyeing stocks

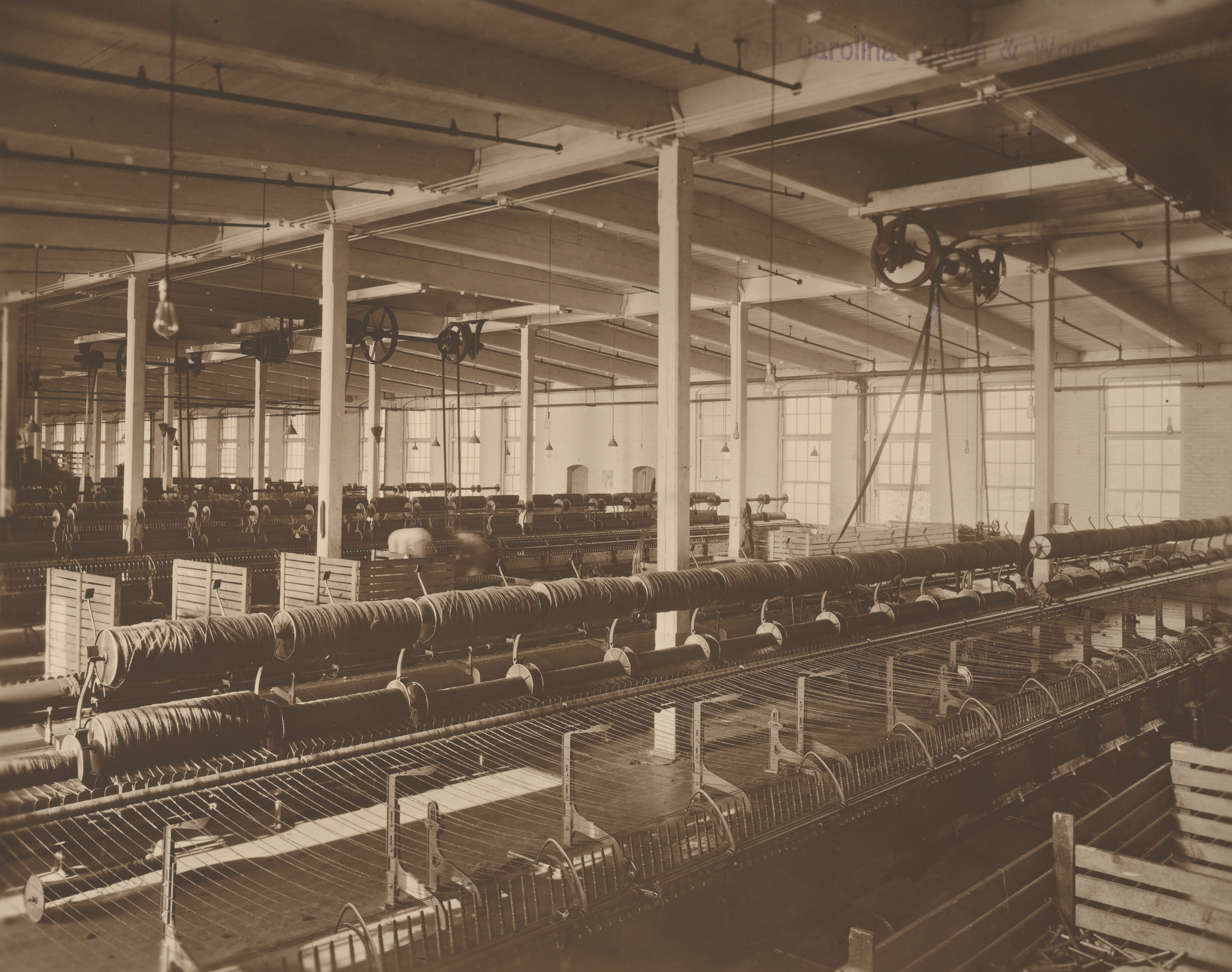
Mule spinning department

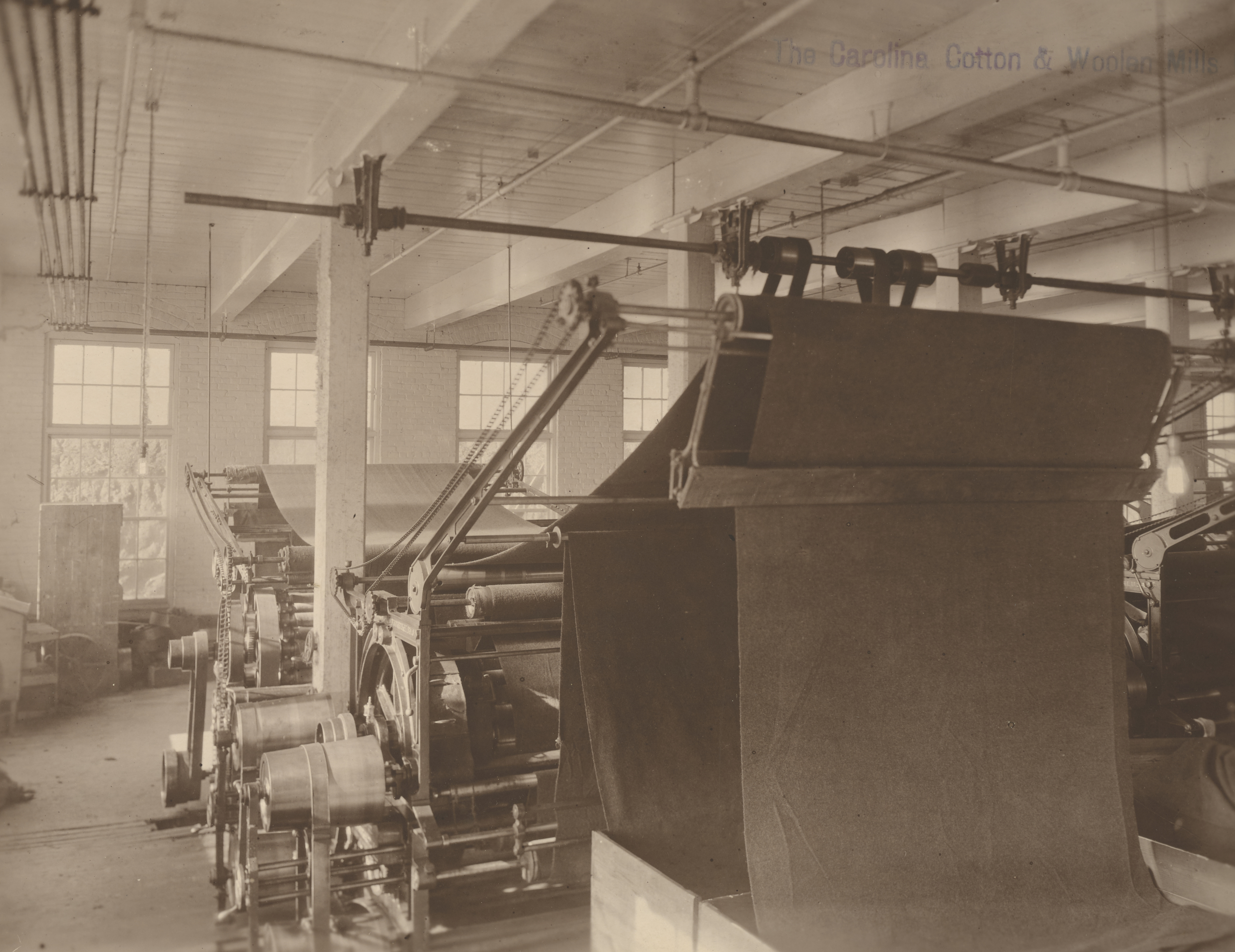
Napping the blankets
