= Cascade Plantation =

Historic house in North Carolina, United States

- U.S. National Register of Historic Places
- Location within North Carolina Location within the United States
- Location: NE of Eden off NC 770, near Eden, North Carolina
- Coordinates: 36°31′22″N 79°39′29″W
- Area: 6 acres (2.4 ha)
- Built: 1830s
- Architectural style: Federal
- NRHP reference No.: 75001288
- Added to NRHP: October 14, 1975

Cascade Plantation, also known as Willow Oaks, is a historic plantation house located near Eden, Rockingham County, North Carolina. It dates to the 1830s, and is a two-story, five bay by three bay, Federal style frame dwelling. It sits on a brick basement and is sheathed in weatherboard. It has pairs of brick exterior chimneys on each gable end.

Willow Oaks plantation was the home of Dan River Inc. founder and president Thomas Benton Fitzgerald from 1897 to 1916.

It was listed on the National Register of Historic Places in 1975.
