= Madison, North Carolina =

Madison
- Town
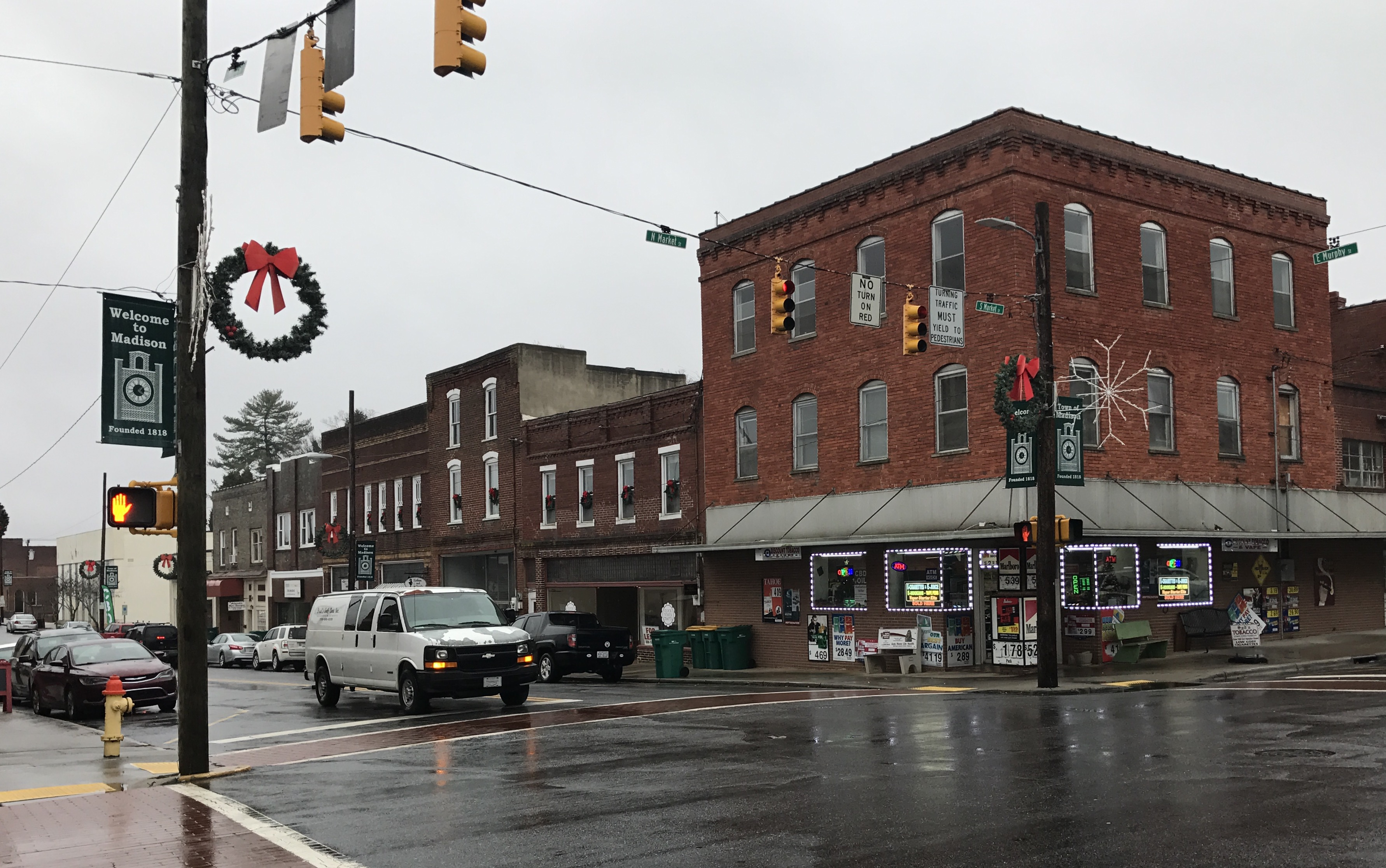
- Downtown Madison in 2020

- Seal
- Motto: "Bridging the past with the future!"
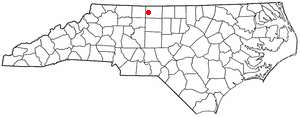
- Location of Madison, North Carolina
- Coordinates: 36°23′13″N 79°58′30″W
- Country: United States
- State: North Carolina
- County: Rockingham

Government
  - Mayor: William Phillips

Area
  - Total: 3.56 sq mi (9.21 km^{2})
  - Land: 3.54 sq mi (9.17 km^{2})
  - Water: 0.015 sq mi (0.04 km^{2})
- Elevation: 610 ft (190 m)

Population (2020)
  - Total: 2,129
  - Density: 601.5/sq mi (232.23/km^{2})
- Time zone: UTC-5 (Eastern (EST))
  - Summer (DST): UTC-4 (EDT)
- ZIP code: 27025
- Area code: 336
- FIPS code: 37-40560
- GNIS feature ID: 2406073
- Website: www.townofmadison.org

Madison is a town located in Rockingham County, North Carolina. At the 2020 census, the town had a total population of 2,132. Madison is part of the Greensboro-High Point Metropolitan Statistical Area of the Piedmont Triad metro region.

It was home to the corporate headquarters of Remington Arms until 2020, when the company was made defunct by bankruptcy proceedings. It is still home to Marlin Firearms, which was an asset of Remington now owned by Sturm, Ruger & Co.

== History ==
In 1940, artist Jean Watson painted the mural Early Summer in North Carolina in the town's post office as a project commissioned by the Works Progress Administration.

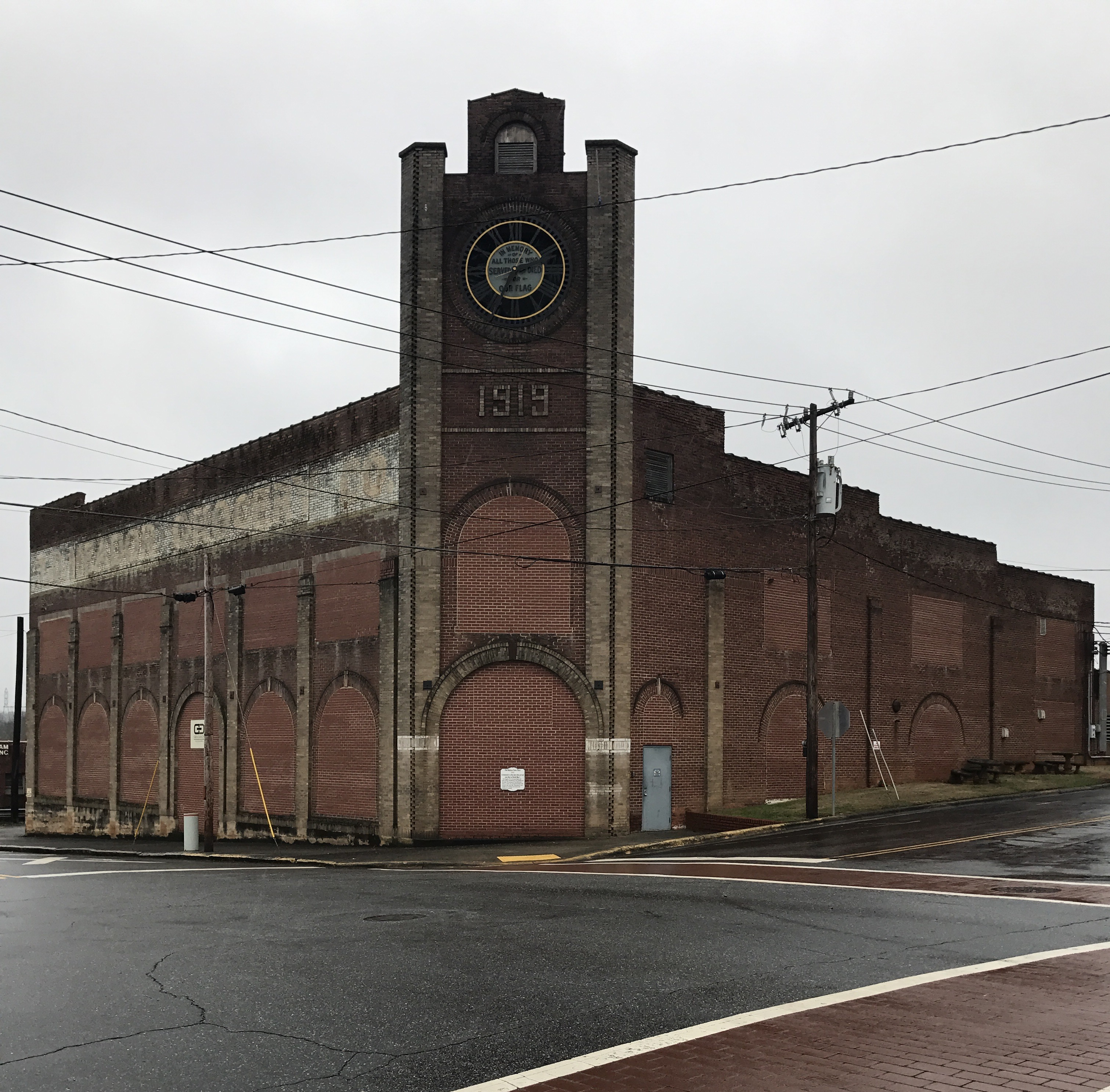
War Memorial Clock Tower

The Academy Street Historic District, The Boxwoods, Cross Rock Rapid Sluice, Fewell-Reynolds House, Gravel Shoals Sluice, Jacob's Creek Landing, Mayo River Sluice, Roberson's Fish Trap Shoal Sluice, Alfred Moore Scales Law Office, and Slink Shoal Sluice and Wing Dams are listed on the National Register of Historic Places. The Boxley House, in downtown Madison, is the oldest standing structure in the town.

== Schools ==
- Preschools: Western Rockingham Preschool/Daycare
- Elementary schools: Dillard Academy, Huntsville Elementary School, and

New Vision Elementary School (Merged with Dillard Elementary in 2018)

- Middle school: Western Rockingham Middle School
- High school (in Mayodan, NC): Dalton L. McMichael High School

== Geography ==
According to the United States Census Bureau, the town has a total area of 3.3 square miles (8.5 km^{2}), of which, 3.0 square miles (7.8 km^{2}) is land and 0.30% is water.

== Demographics ==
Historical population
Census	Pop.	Note	%±
1870	295		—
1880	361		22.4%
1890	450		24.7%
1900	813		80.7%
1910	1,033		27.1%
1920	1,247		20.7%
1930	1,497		20.0%
1940	1,683		12.4%
1950	1,789		6.3%
1960	1,912		6.9%
1970	2,018		5.5%
1980	2,806		39.0%
1990	2,371		−15.5%
2000	2,262		−4.6%
2010	2,246		−0.7%
2020	2,129		−5.2%
2021 (est.)	2,120	▼	−0.4%
U.S. Decennial Census

=== 2020 census ===
As of the 2020 census, Madison had a population of 2,129, with 595 families residing in the town.

The median age was 46.2 years. 18.5% of residents were under the age of 18 and 25.0% were 65 years of age or older. For every 100 females, there were 89.9 males, and for every 100 females age 18 and over, there were 86.3 males age 18 and over.

There were 998 households, of which 25.8% had children under the age of 18 living in them. Of all households, 32.4% were married-couple households, 22.2% were households with a male householder and no spouse or partner present, and 37.5% were households with a female householder and no spouse or partner present. About 38.8% of all households were made up of individuals, and 19.6% had someone living alone who was 65 years of age or older.

There were 1,131 housing units, of which 11.8% were vacant. The homeowner vacancy rate was 3.5% and the rental vacancy rate was 10.1%. 100.0% of residents lived in urban areas, while 0.0% lived in rural areas.

Madison racial composition
Race	Number	Percentage
White (non-Hispanic)	1,332	62.56%
Black or African American (non-Hispanic)	587	27.57%
Native American	13	0.61%
Asian	25	1.17%
Other/Mixed	88	4.13%
Hispanic or Latino	84	3.95%

=== 2000 census ===
At the census of 2000, there were 2,262 people, 972 households, and 626 families in the town. The population density was 686.5 inhabitants per square mile (265.1/km^{2}). There were 1,056 housing units at an average density of 320.5 per square mile (123.7/km^{2}). The racial makeup of the town was 97.32% White, 1.54% African American, 0.31% Native American, 0.35% Asian, 0.13% Pacific Islander, 0.59% from other races, and 0.75% from two or more races. 1.41% of the population were Hispanic or Latino of any race.

Of the 972 households 25.5% had children under the age of 18 living with them, 45.3% were married couples living together, 15.5% had a female householder with no husband present, and 35.5% were non-families. 31.5% of households were one person and 16.5% had someone living alone who was 65 or older. The average household size was 2.33 and the average family size was 2.92.

The age distribution was 22.2% under the age of 18, 7.7% from 18 to 24, 27.0% from 25 to 44, 24.8% from 45 to 64, and 18.3% 65 or older. The median age was 40 years. For every 100 females, there were 88.2 males. For every 100 females age 18 and over, there were 83.7 males.

The median household income was $38,955 and the median family income was $36,429. Males had a median income of $32,109 and females $21,379. The per capita income for the town was $19,494. 10.5% of the population and 8.2% of families were below the poverty line. Out of the total population, 14.5% of those under the age of 18 and 2.7% of those 65 and older were living below the poverty line.

== Notable people ==
Notable natives and residents of Madison include:

- Linda Carter Brinson (born 1948) – editor and writer
- Richard H. Cardwell (1845–1931) – politician and judge, served as Speaker of the Virginia House of Delegates and Justice of the Virginia Supreme Court
- William D. Cardwell (1868–1954) – politician, served as Speaker of the Virginia House of Delegates
- Benny Carter (1943–2014) – painter, grew up in Madison
- J. P. Carter (1915–2000) – politician and military officer, served as mayor of Madison
- Mary Cardwell Dawson (1894–1962) – opera singer and voice teacher
- Robert Opie Lindsay (1894-1952) – World War I flying ace
- William "Bill" Lindsay (1881-1963) – baseball player
- Maryhelen Mayfield (1946—2024) – ballet dancer and arts administrator
- Dalton L. McMichael (1914–2001) – business executive and philanthropist
- Johnny Meador (1892–1970) – baseball player
- Carolyn Pfeiffer – film producer
- Henrietta Williams Settle Reid (1824–1913) – First Lady of North Carolina
- Charles A. Reynolds (1848–1936) – engineer and politician, served as lieutenant governor of North Carolina
- Alfred Moore Scales (1827–1892) – politician, served as governor of North Carolina
- Shirley Wilson (1925–2021) – football player and coach
