= Central Leaksville Historic District =

Historic district in North Carolina, United States

- U.S. National Register of Historic Places
- U.S. Historic district
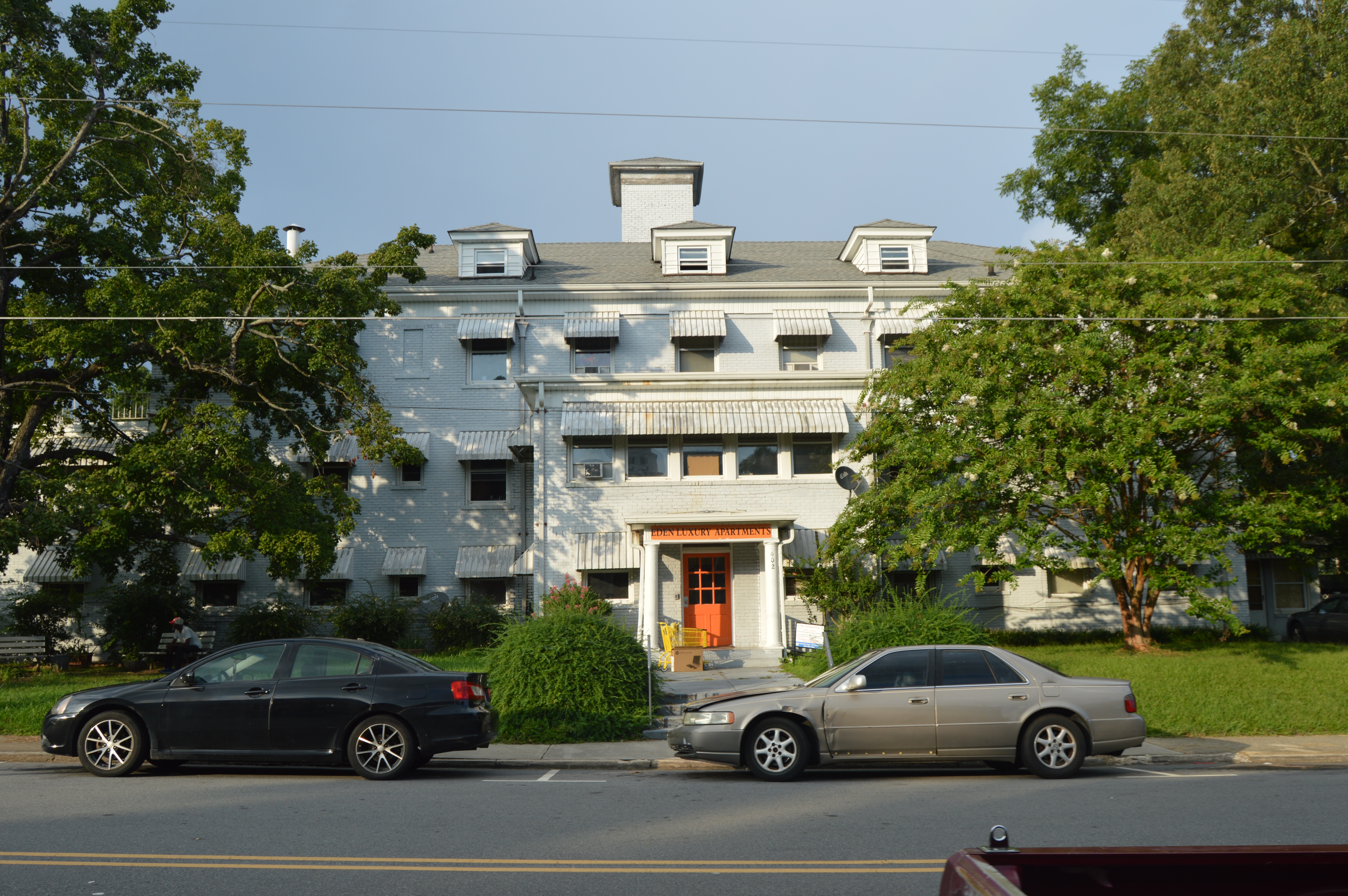
- Former hospital on Henry Street

- Location within North Carolina Location within the United States
- Location: Roughly bounded by Lindsay, Monroe, Jay, Washington, and Kemp Sts., Eden, North Carolina
- Coordinates: 36°29′31″N 79°46′5″W
- Area: 54.5 acres (22.1 ha)
- Built: 1815
- Architectural style: Italianate, Queen Anne, Colonial Revival; Bungalow
- NRHP reference No.: 86003376
- Added to NRHP: December 9, 1986

Central Leaksville Historic District is a national historic district located at Eden, Rockingham County, North Carolina. It encompasses 67 contributing buildings, 2 contributing sites, and 1 contributing object in a residential section of the town of Eden. It was developed from about 1815 to about 1935, and includes notable examples of Italianate, Queen Anne, Colonial Revival, and Bungalow style architecture. Notable buildings include the Rogers-Martin-Taylor House (c. 1815), Saunders-Hege House (c. 1850), Robinson-Dillard-Martin House (c. 1860), Lawson-Moir-Clayton House (c. 1842), Episcopal Church of the Epiphany (1844), J. M. Hopper House (1885), Norman-DeHart House (c. 1925), and Casteen House (c. 1920).

It was listed on the National Register of Historic Places in 1986.
