= Dan River Navigation System in North Carolina Thematic Resources =

- U.S. National Register of Historic Places
- Nearest city: Eden, Madison, and Wentworth, North Carolina
- Area: 2.1 acres (0.85 ha)
- Built: c. 1823-1890
- MPS
- NRHP reference No.: 64000450
- Added to NRHP: March 19, 1984

Dan River Navigation System in North Carolina Thematic Resources includes a set of historic wing dams, sluices, and hauling walls located near Eden, Madison, and Wentworth, Rockingham County, North Carolina. They were built between about 1823 and 1890 to improve navigation on the Dan River.

== Components ==
The 11 components of the thematic resources listing were added on the National Register of Historic Places in 1984.

They are:

- Cross Rock Rapid Sluice
- Dead Timber Ford Sluices
- Eagle Falls Sluice
- Gravel Shoals Sluice
- Jacob's Creek Landing
- Mayo River Sluice
- Roberson's Fish Trap Shoal Sluice
- Slink Shoal Sluice and Wing Dams
- Tanyard Shoal Sluice
- Three Ledges Shoal Sluice
- Wide Mouth Shoal Sluice
