= St. Luke's Episcopal Church (Eden, North Carolina) =

Historic church in North Carolina, United States

- U.S. National Register of Historic Places
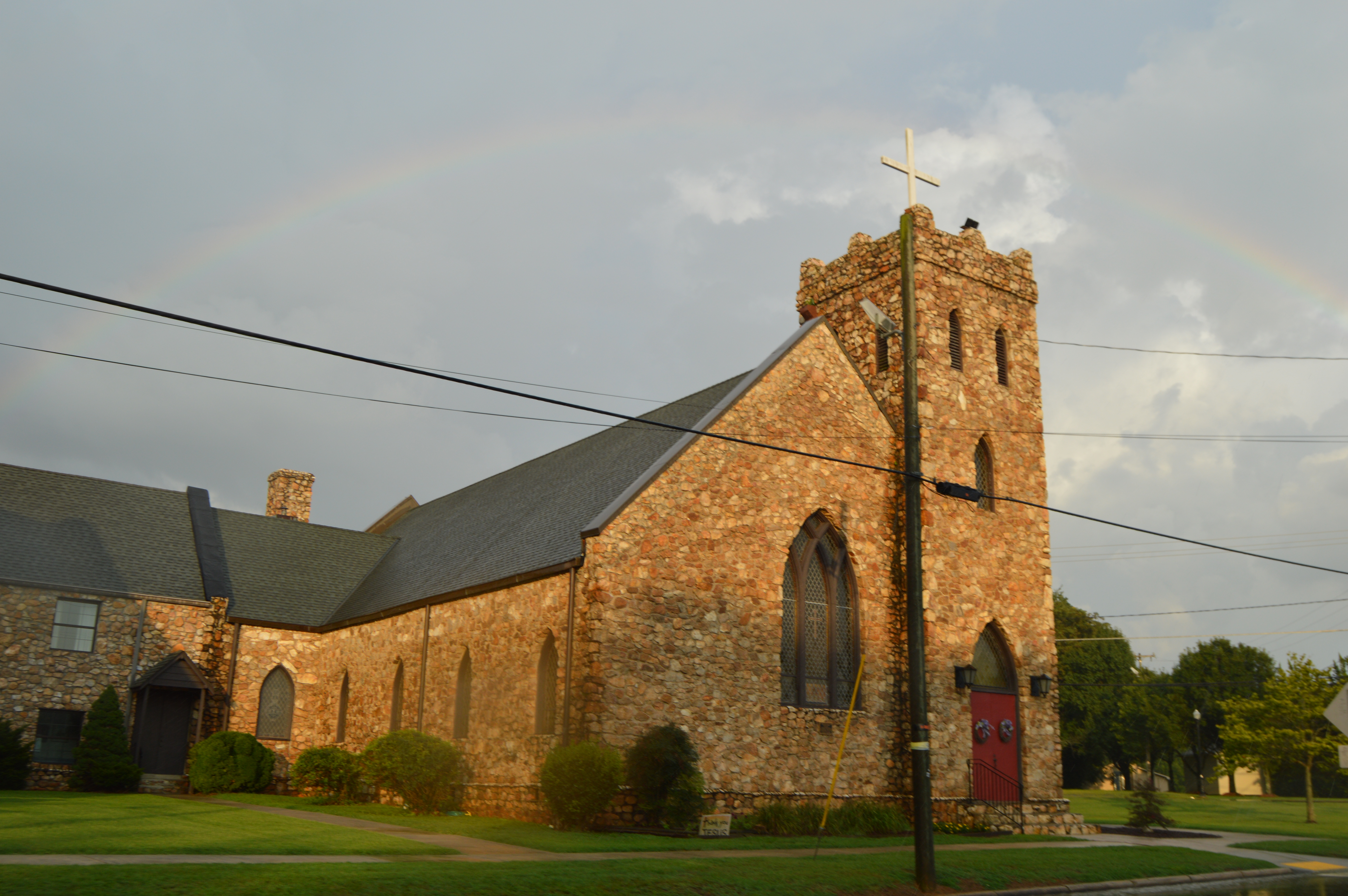
- Facade

- Location within North Carolina Location within the United States
- Location: 604 Morgan Rd., Eden, North Carolina
- Coordinates: 36°31′1″N 79°45′39″W
- Area: less than one acre
- Built: 1926
- Architect: J.W. Hopper; Jim Chatham
- Architectural style: Mission Gothic
- NRHP reference No.: 89000177
- Added to NRHP: March 17, 1989

St. Luke's Episcopal Church, also known as The Rock Church, is a historic Episcopal church located at 604 Morgan Road in Eden, Rockingham County, North Carolina. It was built in 1926, and is a one-story Mission Gothic style solid masonry church. It has a gabled roof that is intersected by gabled transepts and a pointed arch tracery stained glass window. A stained-glass window at St. Luke's was given by Lily Morehead Mebane in memory of her mother, Mary Lily Connally Morehead. It features a three-stage crenellated corner tower.

It was added to the National Register of Historic Places in 1989.
