= The Boxwoods =

Historic house in North Carolina, United States

- U.S. National Register of Historic Places
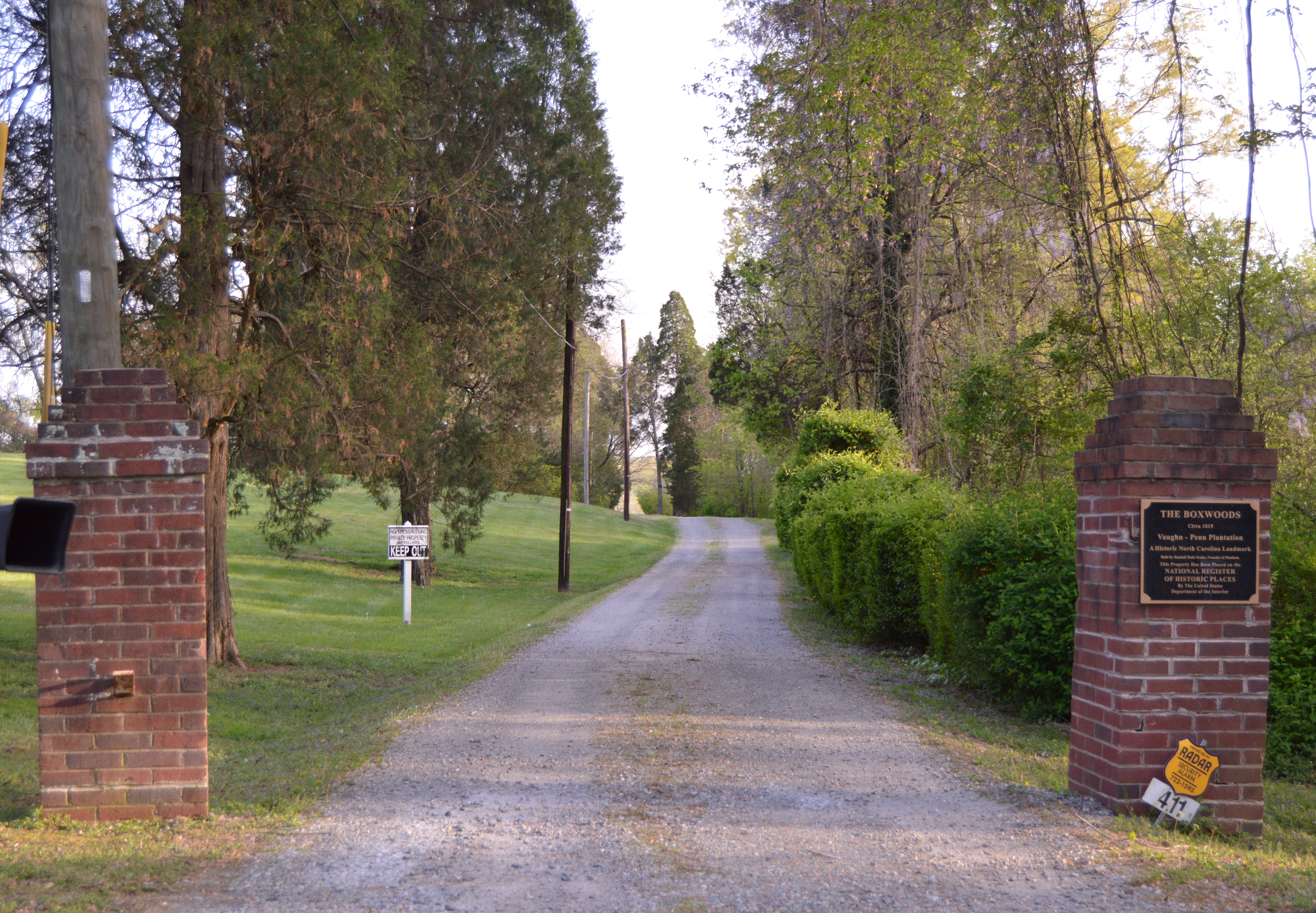
- Property entrance

- Location within North Carolina Location within the United States
- Location: Penn Lane, Madison, North Carolina
- Coordinates: 36°31′22″N 79°39′29″W
- Area: 8.4 acres (3.4 ha)
- Built: c. 1815
- Architectural style: Federal
- NRHP reference No.: 80002898
- Added to NRHP: May 28, 1980

The Boxwoods (also known as Rural Retreat) is a historic plantation house located near Madison, Rockingham County, North Carolina. It was built about 1815, and is a two-story, five-bay, Federal-style brick dwelling. It has a small one-story, gabled frame addition. It has pairs of brick exterior chimneys on each gable end and features a full-length one-story mid-19th century porch.

It was listed on the National Register of Historic Places in 1980.
