= Dr. Franklin King House-Idlewild =

Historic house in North Carolina, United States

- U.S. National Register of Historic Places
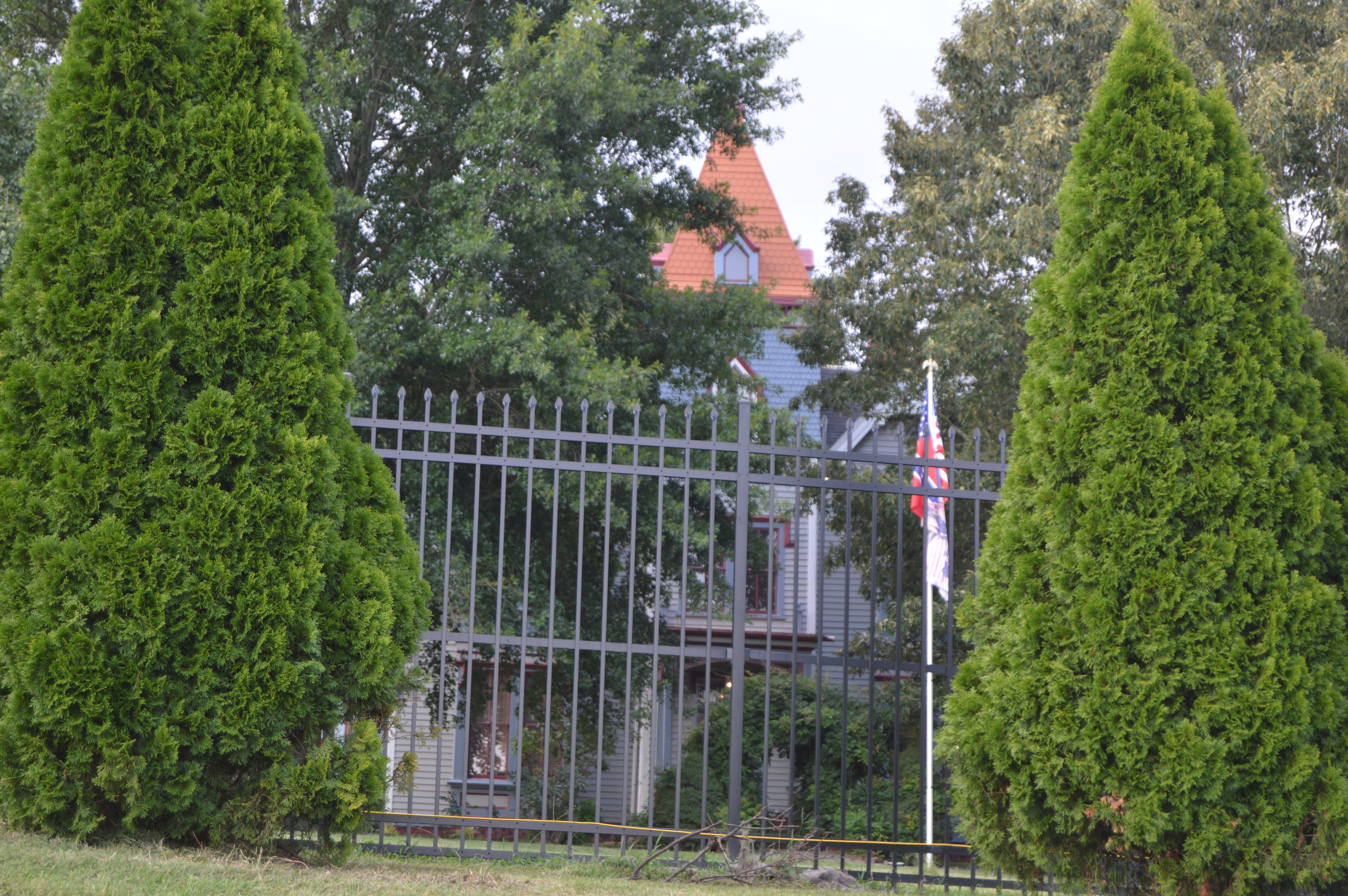
- Street view

- Location within North Carolina Location within the United States
- Location: 700 block of Bridge St., Eden, North Carolina
- Coordinates: 36°29′26″N 79°45′40″W
- Area: 4 acres (1.6 ha)
- Built: 1875
- Architectural style: Italianate, Queen Anne, Gothic Revival
- NRHP reference No.: 85002415
- Added to NRHP: September 19, 1985

Dr. Franklin King House-Idlewild is a historic home located at Eden, Rockingham County, North Carolina. It was built in 1875, and is a 2 1/2-story, style frame dwelling with a 3 1/2-story tower. It combines elements of the Italianate, Queen Anne and Gothic Revival styles.

It was listed on the National Register of Historic Places in 1983.
