= Lower Sauratown Plantation =

Historic farm in North Carolina, United States

- U.S. National Register of Historic Places
- Nearest city: Eden, North Carolina
- Area: 4 acres (1.6 ha)
- Built: 1825
- NRHP reference No.: 84000071
- Site 31RK1
- U.S. National Register of Historic Places
- Location: Southern side of the Dan River, southeast of Eden, near Eden, North Carolina
- Area: 12 acres (4.9 ha)
- NRHP reference No.: 84002474
- Added to NRHP: May 24, 1984
- Added to NRHP: October 11, 1984

Lower Sauratown Plantation includes the remnants of a historic plantation and archaeological site located near Eden, Rockingham County, North Carolina. The plantation remnants include a plantation office building (c. 1825), a mid-19th century brick dwelling house, the Brodnax family cemetery, the remains of an extensive boxwood garden, and numerous below-grade foundations. The office and dwelling house were restored in 1983. Site 31RK1 is located on the Lower Sauratown Plantation and includes the remains of a large 17th-century Indian town of the Cheraw. Lower Sauratown Plantation was the boyhood home of Governor Robert Broadnax Glenn, the adopted son of Dr. Edward T. Brodnax.

It was listed on the National Register of Historic Places in 1984.
