= WCLW =

- Eden, North Carolina; United States
- Frequency: 1130 kHz

Programming
- Format: Southern Gospel

Ownership
- Owner: Reidsvile Baptist Church

History
- First air date: August 16, 1970
- Former call signs: WCBX (1970–1987); WWMO (1987–1989); WEDE (1989–1993)

Technical information
- Licensing authority: FCC
- Class: D
- Power: 1000 watts daytime only
- Transmitter coordinates: 36°31′21″N 79°45′55″W

Links
- Public license information: Public file; LMS
- Website: reidsvillebaptist.org/wclw-radio

WCLW (1130 AM) is a radio station broadcasting a Southern Gospel format. Licensed to Eden, North Carolina, United States, it serves the Eden area. The station is currently owned by Reidsvile Baptist Church. The station first signed on August 16, 1970, as WCBX. It was put on the air by Radio Eden Inc. with Ray A. Childers as president and general manager. The studios were located in a building on Kings Highway in Eden, with the transmitter north of the city.<1971 Broadcasting Yearbook>
