= Henry T. and Rebecca Reynolds House =

Historic house in Utah, United States

- U.S. National Register of Historic Places
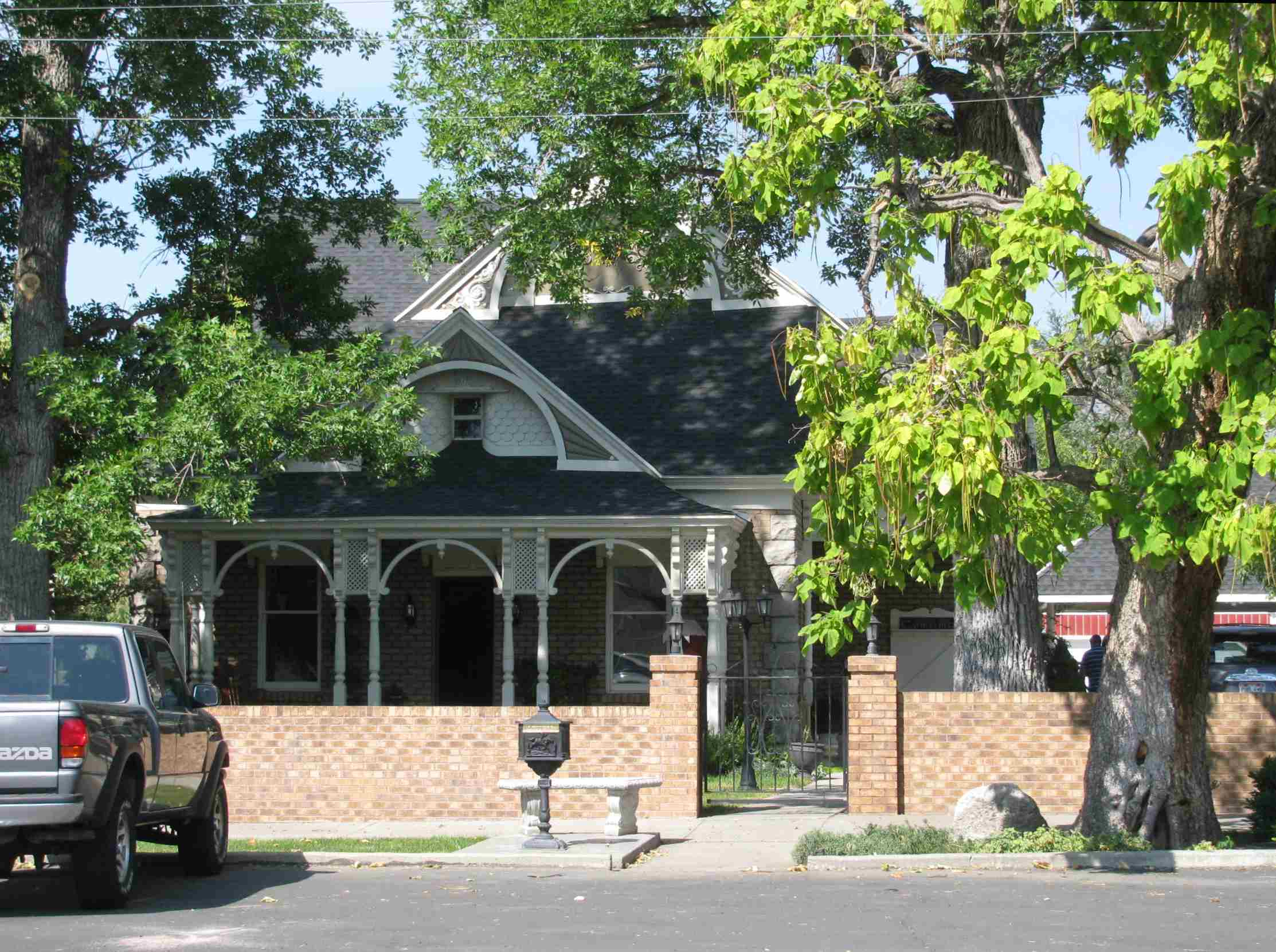
- Henry T. and Rebecca Reynolds House, September 2012

- Location within Utah Location within the United States
- Location: 270 W 200 S, Springville, Utah
- Coordinates: 40°9′52″N 111°36′53″W
- Area: 0.4 acres (0.16 ha)
- Built: 1875
- Architectural style: Greek Revival
- MPS: Springville MPS
- NRHP reference No.: 97001577
- Added to NRHP: January 5, 1998

The Henry T. and Rebecca Reynolds House is a historic residence within the Springville Historic District in Springville, Utah, United States, that is listed on the National Register of Historic Places (NRHP).

== Description ==
The house is located at 270 West 200 South and was built in 1875. It includes Greek Revival architecture. It was listed on the National Register of Historic Places in 1998.

It was listed on the NRHP January 5, 1998.

== See also ==
- National Register of Historic Places listings in Utah County, Utah
