= John T. and Henry T. Reynolds Jr. House =

Historic house in Utah, United States

- U.S. National Register of Historic Places
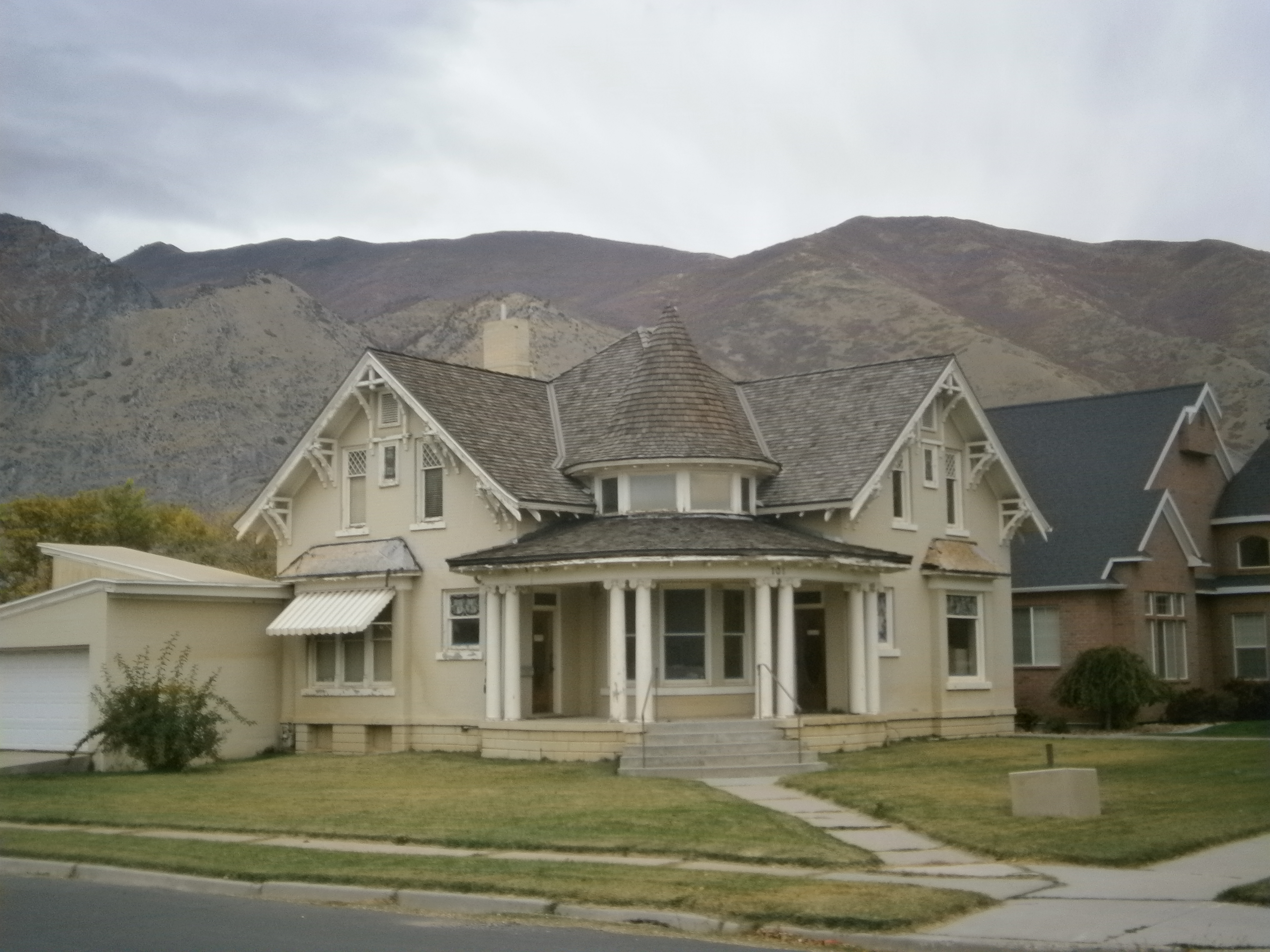
- The house in October 2022

- Location within Utah Location within the United States
- Location: 101 East 200 South, Springville, Utah; United States
- Coordinates: 40°9′51″N 111°36′28″W
- Area: less than one acre
- Built: 1910
- Built by: Ed Child, Lewis J. Whitney
- Architectural style: Bungalow/craftsman, Late Victorian, Victorian Eclectic
- NRHP reference No.: 85001393
- Added to NRHP: June 27, 1985

The John T. and Henry T. Reynolds Jr. House is a historic residence within the Springville Historic District in Springville, Utah, United States, that is listed on the National Register of Historic Places (NRHP).

== Description ==
The house is located at 101 East 200 South and was built in 1910. It was designed by architect Lewis J. Whitney and was built with brickwork by Ed Child for John T. Reynolds. The house was sold in 1919 to Henry T. "Harry" Reynolds Jr., whose family stayed in the house until 1983.

It was listed on the NRHP June 27, 1985.

== See also ==
- National Register of Historic Places listings in Utah County, Utah
