= First Baptist Church (Eden, North Carolina) =

Historic church in North Carolina, United States

- U.S. National Register of Historic Places
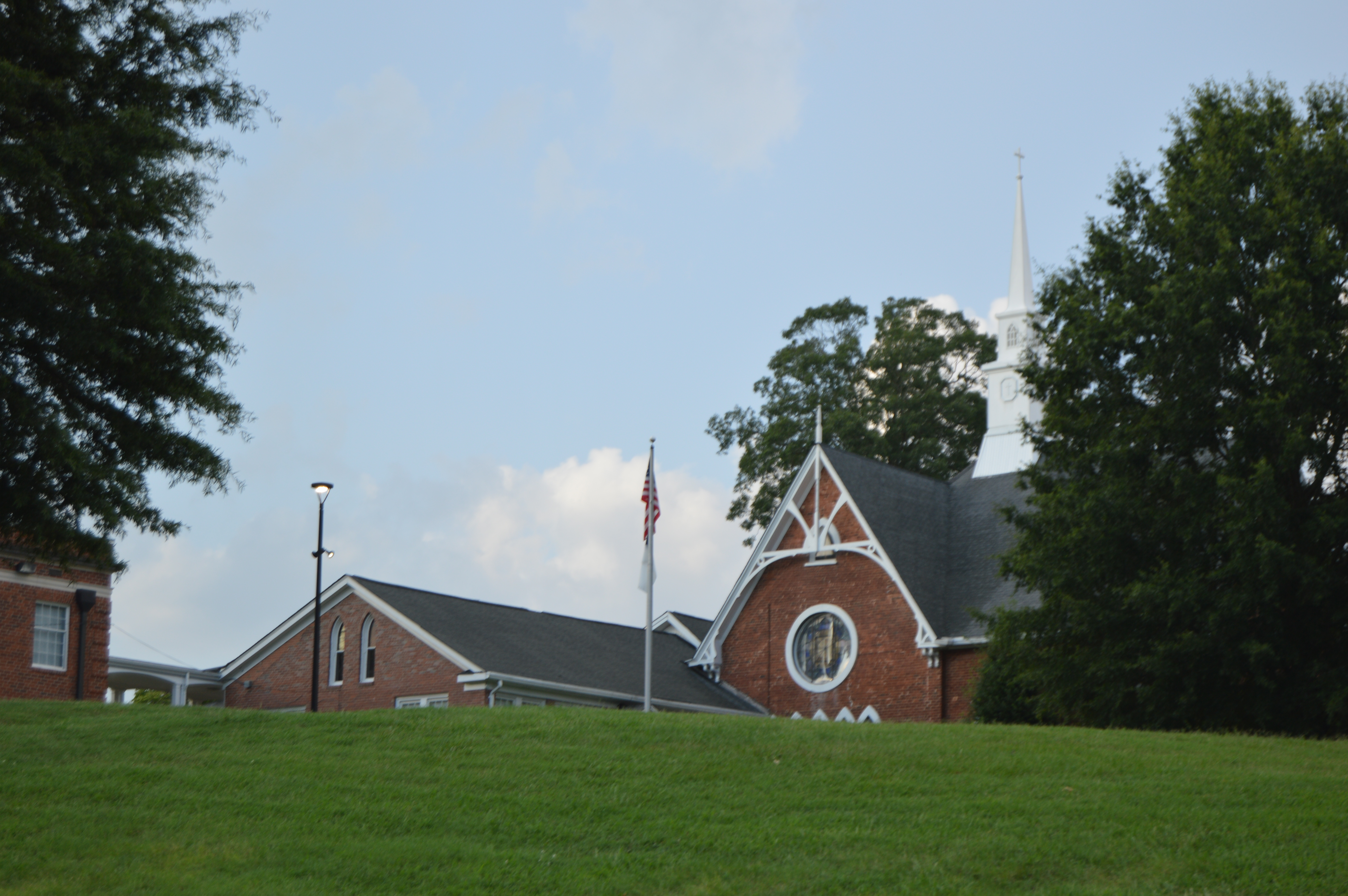
- Distant view

- Location within North Carolina Location within the United States
- Location: 538 Greenwood St., Eden, North Carolina
- Coordinates: 36°29′43″N 79°45′50″W
- Area: 4.2 acres (1.7 ha)
- Built: 1886, 1934, 1937
- Architect: J.M. Hopper
- Architectural style: Colonial Revival, Gothic Revival
- NRHP reference No.: 89000178
- Added to NRHP: March 22, 1989

First Baptist Church, previously known as Leaksville Baptist Church, is a historic Baptist church located at 538 Greenwood Street in Eden, Rockingham County, North Carolina. It was built in 1886, and is a Gothic Revival style brick church. It has a hipped roof with intersecting gables and Stick Style decoration in the gable ends. It features lancet windows and a wooden Gothic belfry with pointed steeple centered on the roof. Two Colonial Revival-style additions were made to the church in 1934 and 1937.

It was added to the National Register of Historic Places in 1989.
