= Leaksville-Spray Institute =

Historic school building in North Carolina, United States

- U.S. National Register of Historic Places
- Location within North Carolina Location within the United States
- Location: 609 College St., Eden, North Carolina
- Coordinates: 36°29′35″N 79°45′34″W
- Area: 3.9 acres (1.6 ha)
- Built: 1901-1905, 1930
- Architectural style: Colonial Revival, Queen Anne
- NRHP reference No.: 89000179
- Added to NRHP: March 9, 1989

Leaksville-Spray Institute, also known as Leaksville-Spray Academy and Leaksville-Spray Intermediate School, was a historic school complex located at Eden, Rockingham County, North Carolina. The complex consisted of the Administration Building, the Girls Home, both finished by 1905, and the classroom and auditorium building constructed in 1930. They were large two-story, Colonial Revival-style brick buildings, with the Girls Home having some Queen Anne-style design elements. The classroom and auditorium building connected the two other buildings. It has been demolished.

It was listed on the National Register of Historic Places in 1989.
