= Bullard-Ray House =

Historic house in North Carolina, United States

- U.S. National Register of Historic Places
- Location within North Carolina Location within the United States
- Location: 650 Washington St., Eden, North Carolina
- Coordinates: 36°29′25″N 79°45′51″W
- Area: less than one acre
- Architectural style: Colonial Revival, Greek Revival
- NRHP reference No.: 82003501
- Added to NRHP: June 11, 1982

Bullard-Ray House is a historic home located at Eden, Rockingham County, North Carolina. The original section was built about 1830, and consists of a two-story, Greek Revival style main block with a recessed two-story wing. It was enlarged and remodeled between 1908 and 1915 in the Colonial Revival style. It has a hipped roof and features a broad, wrap-around porch supported by Doric order columns.

It was listed on the National Register of Historic Places in 1982.
