= Leaksville Commercial Historic District =

Historic district in North Carolina, United States

- U.S. National Register of Historic Places
- U.S. Historic district
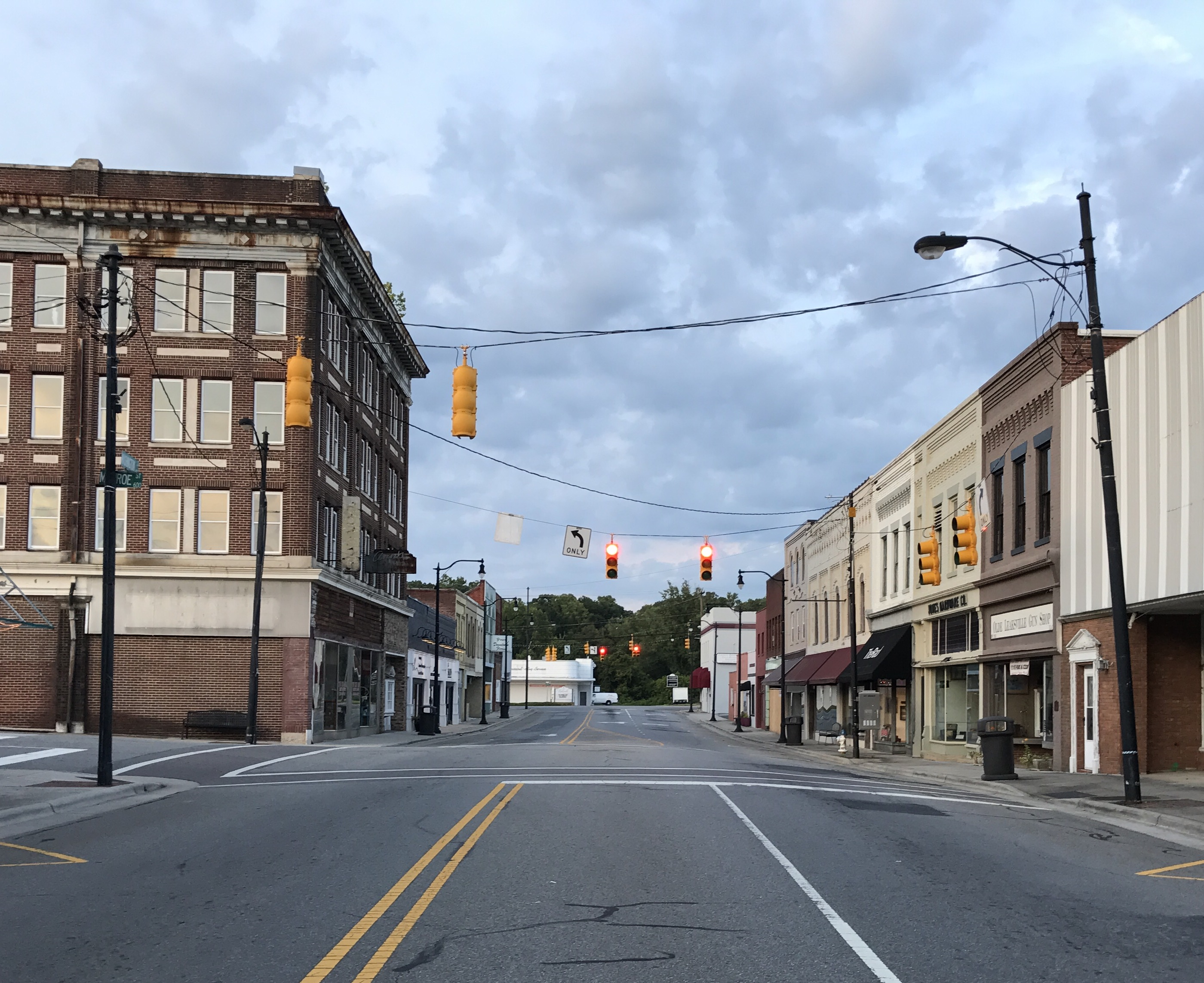

- Location within North Carolina Location within the United States
- Location: 622-656 Washington & 634 Monroe Sts., Eden, North Carolina
- Coordinates: 36°29′25″N 79°45′51″W
- Area: 3 acres (1.2 ha)
- Architect: Simon, Louis A.; Et al.
- Architectural style: Classical Revival, Colonial Revival, Greek Revival
- NRHP reference No.: 87001422
- Added to NRHP: October 23, 1987

Leaksville Commercial Historic District is a national historic district located at Eden, Rockingham County, North Carolina. It encompasses 12 contributing buildings in the central business district of the town of Eden. It includes buildings dated between about 1885 and 1939, and notable examples of Greek Revival, Classical Revival, and Colonial Revival style architecture. Notable buildings include a house built about 1840, the Realty Building (1924-1925), Leaksville Mercantile Building (c. 1890), Carter-Moir Hardware/Smith-Lane Store (c. 1880), the Fagg-King Building (c. 1910), Mitchell's Drug Store (1936), DeHart Building (1938), and United States Post Office (1939) designed by architect Louis A. Simon and built as a Works Progress Administration project.

It was listed on the National Register of Historic Places in 1987.
