= Mt. Sinai Baptist Church (Eden, North Carolina) =

Historic church in North Carolina, United States

- U.S. National Register of Historic Places
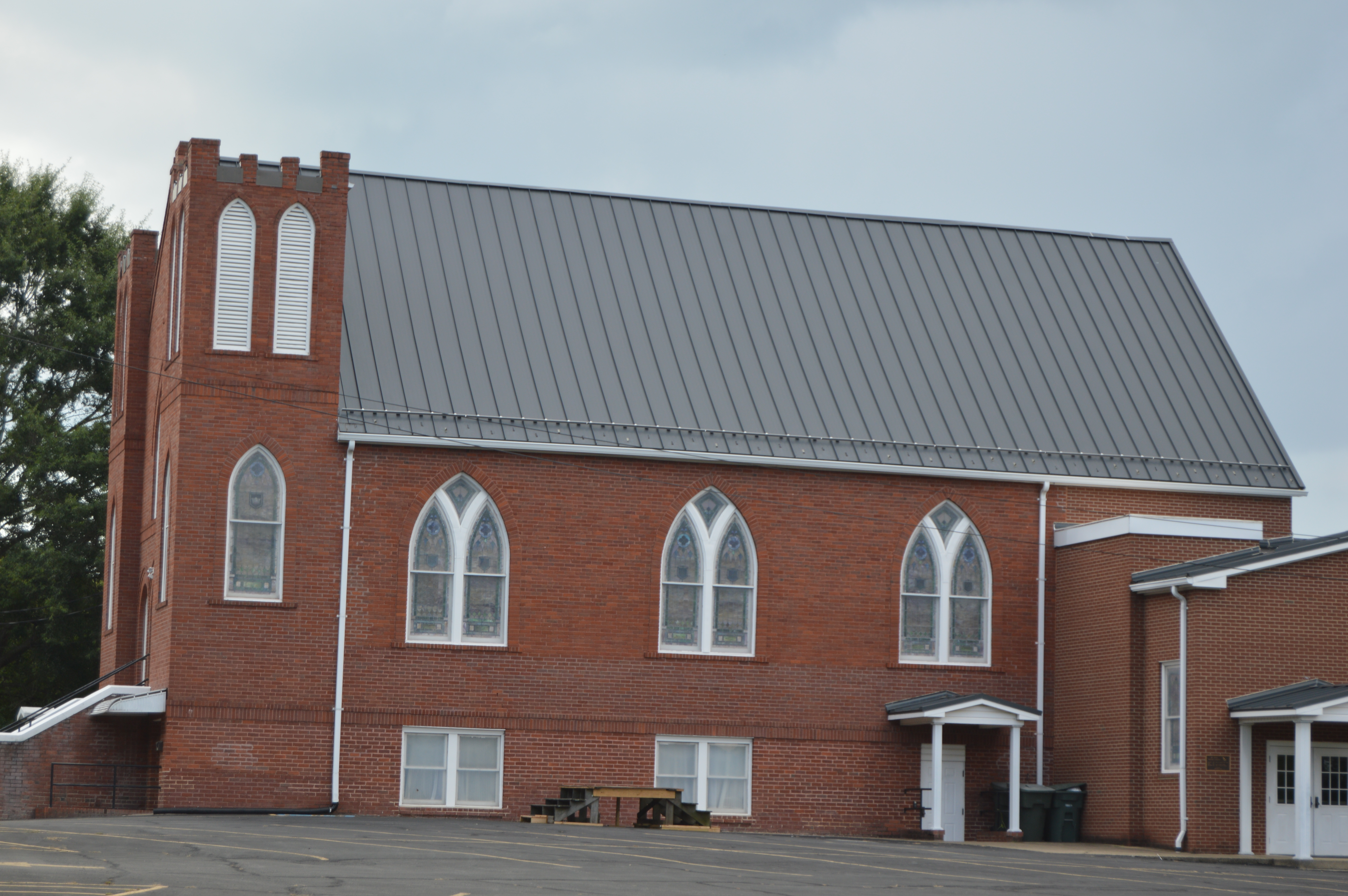
- Southeastern side

- Location within North Carolina Location within the United States
- Location: 512 Henry St., Eden, North Carolina
- Coordinates: 36°29′38″N 79°46′7″W
- Area: 1 acre (0.40 ha)
- Built: 1921
- Architect: James M. Hopper
- Architectural style: Late Gothic Revival
- NRHP reference No.: 87000914
- Added to NRHP: June 25, 1987

Mt. Sinai Baptist Church is a historic Baptist church located at 512 Henry Street in Eden, Rockingham County, North Carolina. It was built in 1921, and is a two-story, Late Gothic Revival-style brick church. It sits on a raised basement and it has tall gable front flanked by square two-stage crenellated bell towers incorporated at each corner. It features pointed arch tower windows and brightly colored stained glass. It is the oldest African-American Baptist church in Eden.

It was added to the National Register of Historic Places in 1987.
