= Dempsey-Reynolds-Taylor House =

Historic house in North Carolina, United States

- U.S. National Register of Historic Places
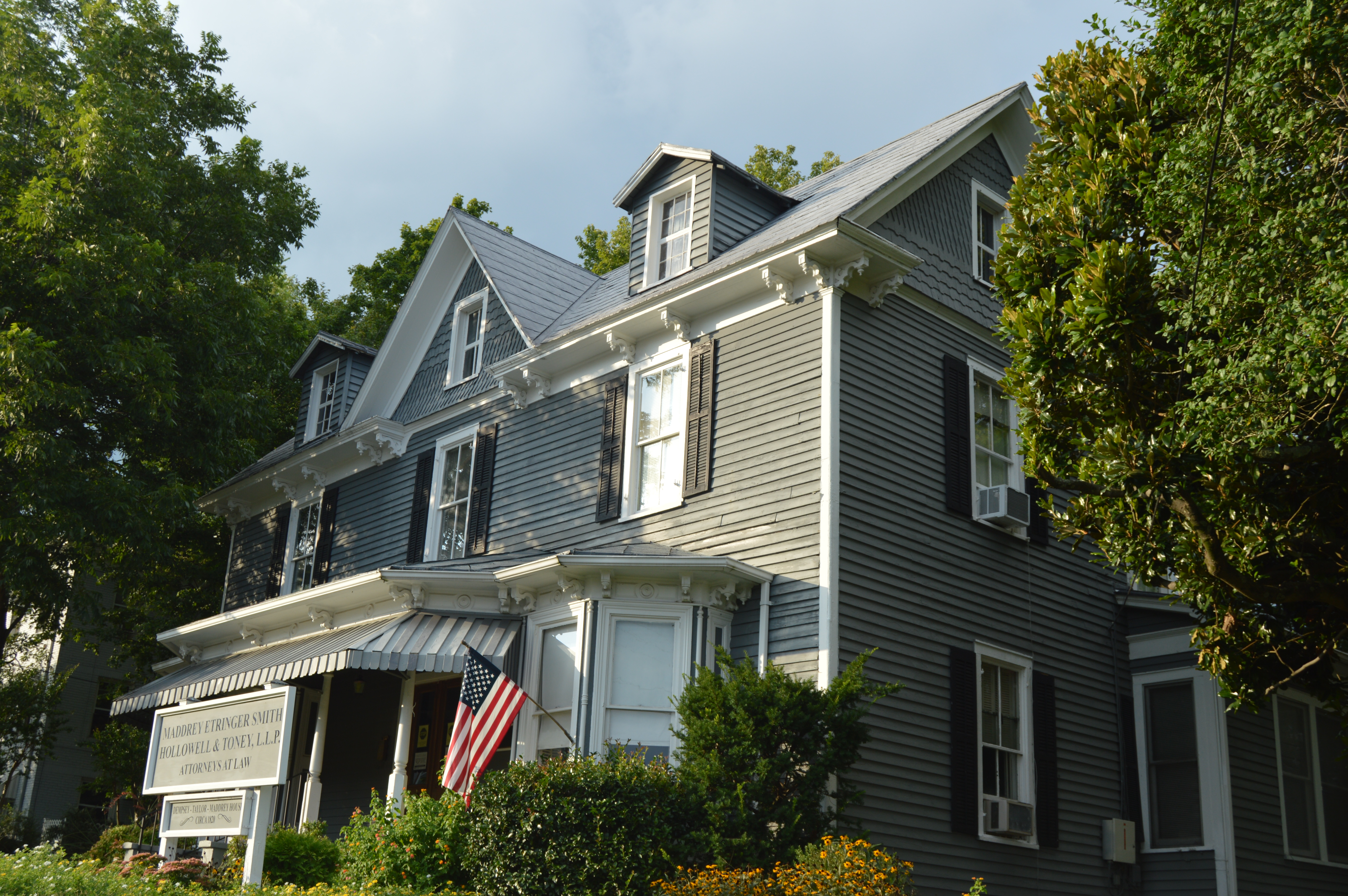
- Sidewalk view

- Location within North Carolina Location within the United States
- Location: 610 Henry St., Eden, North Carolina
- Coordinates: 36°29′29″N 79°45′57″W
- Area: 0.1 acres (0.040 ha)
- Architectural style: Italianate, Queen Anne, Federal
- NRHP reference No.: 83001910
- Added to NRHP: September 8, 1983

Dempsey-Reynolds-Taylor House is a historic home located at Eden, Rockingham County, North Carolina. The original section dates to the early-19th century, and consists of a two-story, Federal-style frame block with an attached 1 1/2-story brick section. It was enlarged by an Italianate / Queen Anne-style main block added in the late-19th century. Later additions to the house occurred in the 1920s.

It was listed on the National Register of Historic Places in 1983.
