= Fewell-Reynolds House =

Historic house in North Carolina, United States

- U.S. National Register of Historic Places
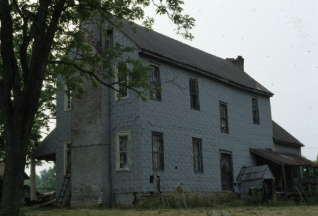
- The house circa 1980
- Nearest city: Madison, North Carolina
- Area: 43 acres (17 ha)
- Built: c. 1820
- Architectural style: Federal
- NRHP reference No.: 79003349
- Added to NRHP: July 16, 1979

The Fewell–Reynolds House is a historic plantation house located near Madison, North Carolina. It was built between 1811 and 1820 by William Fewell, a prosperous planter originally from Virginia, near the Dan River.

== History ==
By 1850, William Fewell had relocated to Missouri (which was then considered part of Tennessee). Census records show that in 1850, he was living in Tebo Township, Henry County, Missouri, with his wife Sarah and children Alvira, Elizabeth, and Rebecca. The 1860 census also records William Fewell living in the same township at age 68.

William Fewell deeded the house to his daughter, Susannah M. F. Reynolds. After Susannah's death in 1853, her husband James T. Reynolds purchased the property from William Fewell in 1856.

Historical accounts note that when the Fewell family moved west to Missouri, they took with them many enslaved people, a barrel of gold coins, and their favorite dog. According to tradition, the dog escaped the carriage and hid under a house, but returned to the Reynolds Plantation a week later.

== Architecture ==
The Fewell–Reynolds House is a frame construction house, three stories tall, with architectural features including a millstone doorstep and a fanlight over the front door. A hand-carved spiral staircase rises two stories to the attic. The house contains finely carved mantels and woodwork, and several rooms measure approximately 20 by 20 feet with abundant natural light. Interior rooms were historically painted in shades of pink and green.

The house has been recognized as a notable example of regional Federal architecture and contains much original woodwork that remains intact.

== Preservation ==
In the 1980s, the Historic Preservation Foundation of North Carolina sold the house under protective covenants to ensure its long-term preservation.

== Recognition ==
It was listed on the National Register of Historic Places in 1979.
