= Academy Street Historic District (Madison, North Carolina) =

Historic district in North Carolina, United States

- U.S. National Register of Historic Places
- U.S. Historic district
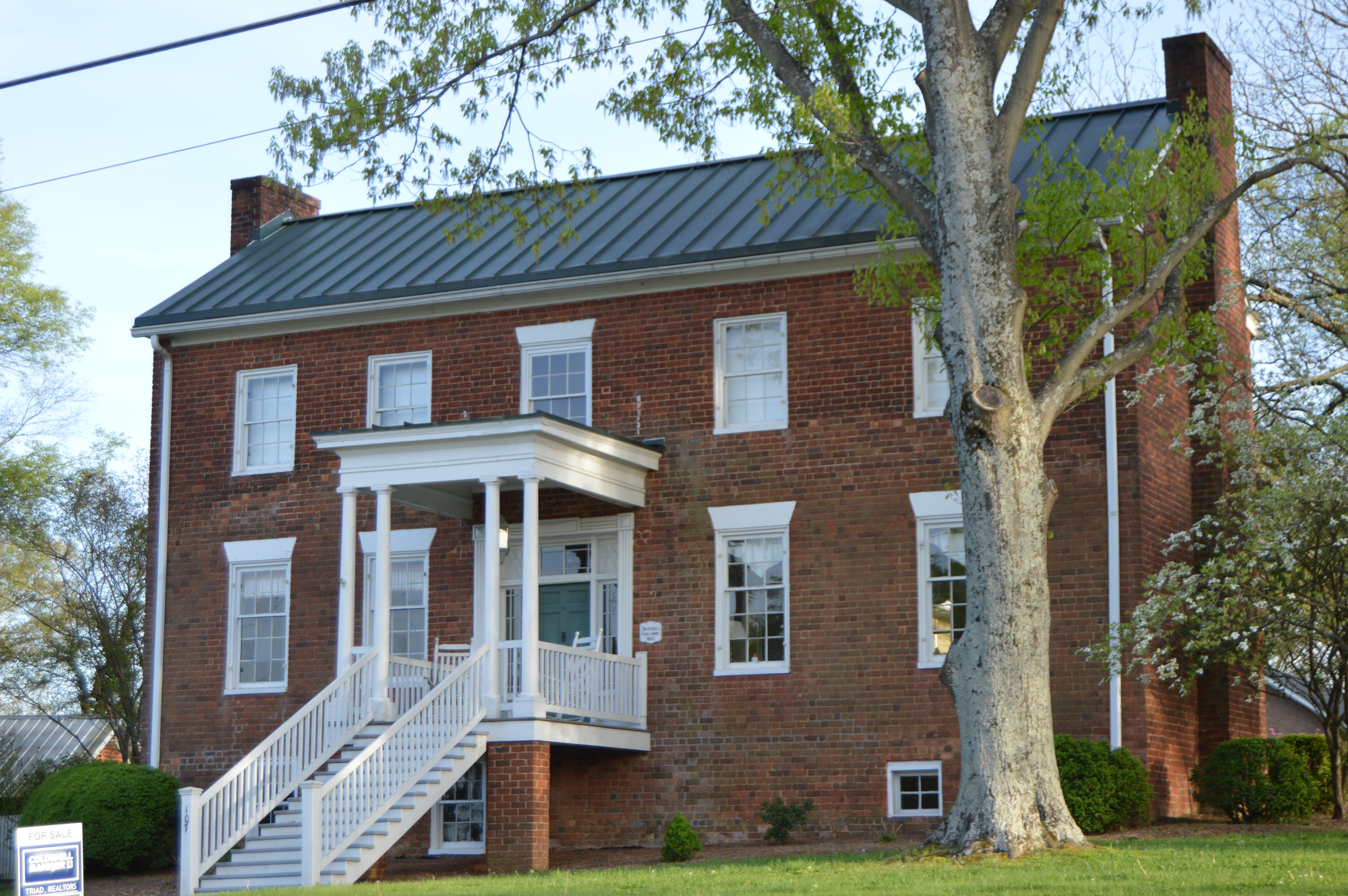
- Twitchell-Gallaway House

- Location within North Carolina Location within the United States
- Location: Academy St., Madison, North Carolina
- Coordinates: 36°23′07″N 79°57′39″W
- Area: 8.2 acres (3.3 ha)
- Architectural style: Mixed (more Than 2 Styles From Different Periods)
- NRHP reference No.: 82003502
- Added to NRHP: July 15, 1982

Academy Street Historic District is a national historic district located at Madison, Rockingham County, North Carolina, United States. It encompasses 12 contributing buildings in the town of Madison. It was developed from the mid-19th to mid-20th century, and includes notable examples of a variety of popular architectural styles. Notable buildings include the Twitchell-Gallaway House (1824), Foy-McAnally House (c. 1840, 1852), Cardwell-Black House (c. 1860), Churchill House, Martin House (c. 1870), Madison United Methodist Church (early 1900s), Pratt-Van Noppen House, and Wakeham (1921).

It was listed on the National Register of Historic Places in 1982.
