= Eden, North Carolina =

- City
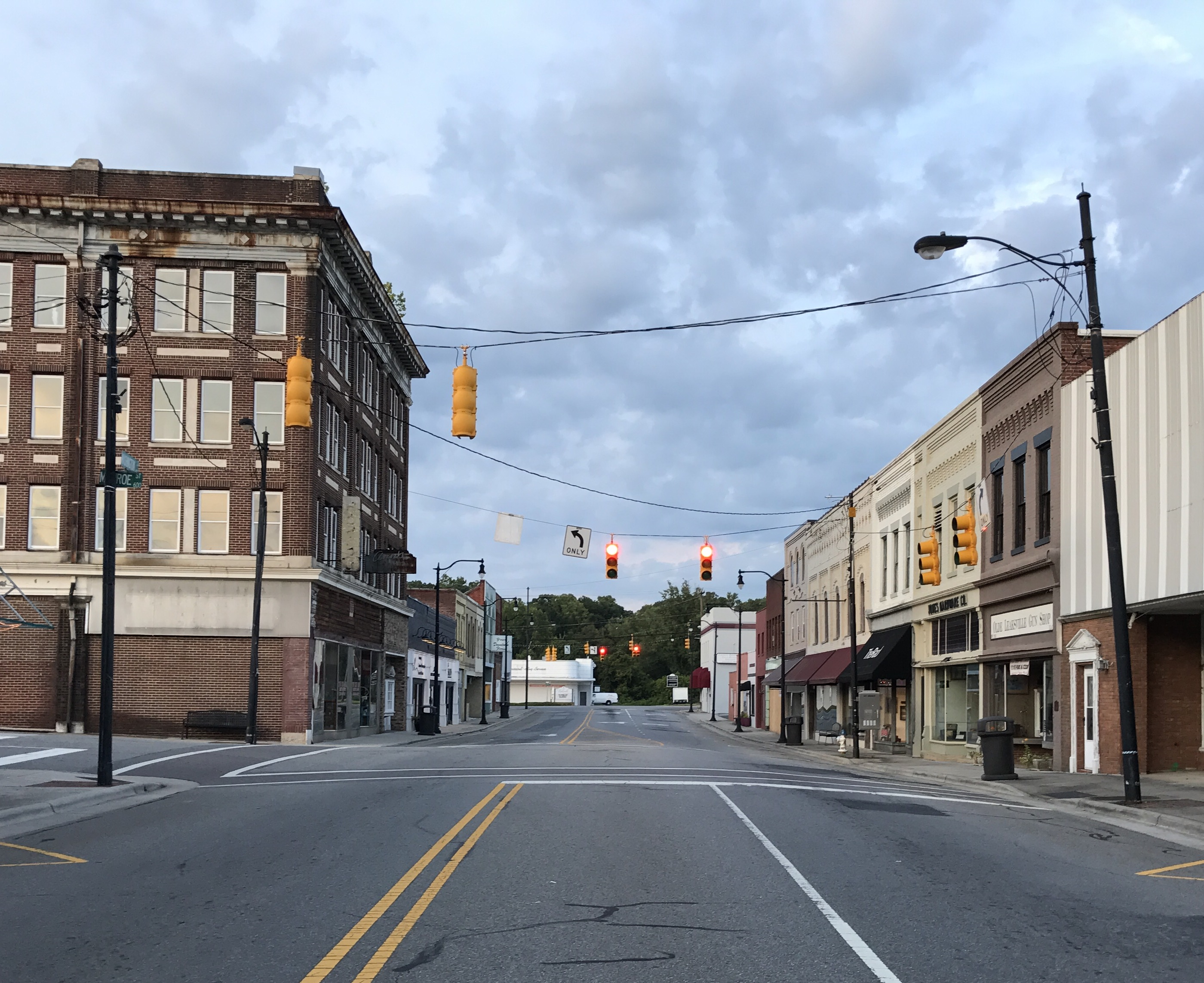
- Leaksville Commercial Historic District

- Seal
- Nickname: Land of 2 Rivers
- Motto: "Small Town, Big Outdoors"
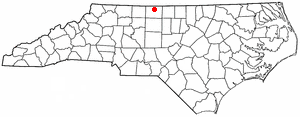
- Location of Eden, North Carolina
- Coordinates: 36°30′10″N 79°44′29″W
- Country: United States
- State: North Carolina
- County: Rockingham
- incorporated: September 12, 1967

Government
  - Type: City Council
  - Mayor: Neville Hall
  - Interim City Manager: Terry Shelton

Area
  - Total: 14.38 sq mi (37.24 km^{2})
  - Land: 14.22 sq mi (36.83 km^{2})
  - Water: 0.16 sq mi (0.41 km^{2})
- Elevation: 633 ft (193 m)

Population (2020)
  - Total: 15,421
  - Rank: 70th in North Carolina
  - Density: 1,084.5/sq mi (418.72/km^{2})
- Time zone: UTC−5 (Eastern (EST))
  - Summer (DST): UTC−4 (EDT)
- ZIP codes: 27288-27289
- Area code: 336
- FIPS code: 37-20080
- GNIS feature ID: 2403539
- Website: www.edennc.us

Eden is a city in Rockingham County in the U.S. state of North Carolina and is part of the Greensboro-High Point Metropolitan Statistical Area of the Piedmont Triad region. As of the 2020 census, the population was 15,405. From the late nineteenth century through much of the 20th, the city was a center of textile mills and manufacturing. The city was incorporated in 1967 through the consolidation of three towns: Leaksville, Spray, and Draper.

== History ==
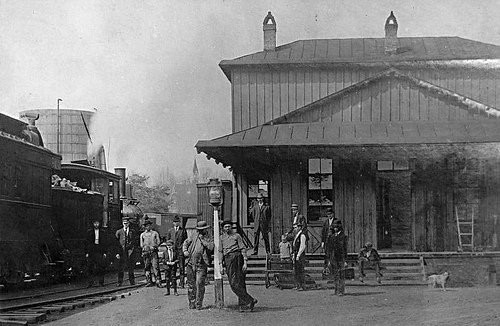
Leaksville (now Eden) station of Danville and Western Railroad, 1912

By the mid-eighteenth century, the territory of present-day Eden was within a 70,000-acre (280 km^{2}) estate owned by William Byrd II, a planter of Virginia and North Carolina. He originally called his estate "The Land of Eden".

During the last years of his life, William Byrd II dreamed of bringing large numbers of Swiss Protestants to the "Land of Eden"; he eventually acquired more than 100,000 acres (400 km^{2}) in Virginia. He envisioned an industrious, self-sufficient colony that would thrive on the abundance of the frontier. Byrd's dream was not to be realized. After years of negotiations, at least one boatload of Swiss did sail for "The Land of Eden" from Europe, but it was shipwrecked in a December gale off the coast of Virginia. None of the few survivors are believed to have reached Eden. Byrd died August 26, 1744. By that time, the "Land of Eden" began to be surrounded by small farms held by a wave of poor Scotch-Irish immigrants, whom Byrd had compared to the "Goths and Vandals."

"Eden" was inherited by William Byrd III, who shared none of his father's dreams of colonization. Young Byrd married Elizabeth Hill Carter in 1748. He sought to dispose of Eden to gain cash to support his grand lifestyle. He was finally successful on November 8, 1755, when he sold 26,000 acres (110 km^{2}) in North Carolina to Simon and Francis Farley, two merchant brothers from the island of Antigua. By this time, yeoman settlement in the area was increasing at a considerable pace. The Farley brothers attempted to create plantations on some of the richest acres, but more frequently, settlers squatted on the land and built homesteads. In 1762 James Parke Farley, son of Francis Farley, went to Williamsburg to attend the College of William and Mary. He married Elizabeth Hill Byrd, daughter of William Byrd III and Elizabeth Hill Carter.

Many later settlers migrating to the Dan River Area knew little of William Byrd. They were familiar with an old Indian village in the area near Town Creek and the Farley holdings. This location became the center of settlement, and the 26,000 acres (110 km^{2}) came to be called the Sauratown tract. In 1775, James Parke Farley and his new bride moved from cosmopolitan Williamsburg, Virginia, to Sauratown.

In the century that Sauratown was in existence, many families settled in the "Land of Eden", and their descendants have stayed in the area, including the Brodnax, Dillard, Ruffin, Morehead, Henry, and Winston families. Many Scots also settled in the area, including the Galloway, Scales, Watt, Lenox, Campbell, and Moir families. Other notable residents of the county include General Lighthorse Harry Lee.

=== 20th century to present ===
Following previous unsuccessful referendums, on September 12, 1967, residents of Leaksville, Draper, Spray, and the unincorporated Meadows Greens Sanitary District voted to consolidate their communities, 2,252 to 1,753 with 60 percent of eligible voters participating. Of these, 784 elected to call the new city Eden, a term surveyor William Byrd II had used to describe the region in the 1700s. The consolidation took immediate effect, and Eden became the largest city in Rockingham County.

- In 1970, the city had considerable growth.
- In 2000, city population grew to 15,908.
- In 2010, the US Census population was 15,527.
- In 2014, 39,000 thousand tons of coal ash and 27 million gallons of contaminated water spilled into the Dan River near Eden from a coal-fired power plant owned by Duke Energy.

In the late 1990s and early 2000s, the local economy suffered due to the closure of several textile mills, an anticipated byproduct of the North American Free Trade Agreement. Fieldcrest Cannon laid off hundreds of corporate staff in the 1990s, Pluma closed its plant in 1999, Spray Cotton Mills closed its yarn mill in 2001, and Pillowtex folded in 2003. Some former workers moved to larger cities in search of jobs. The decline of textiles left the Miller Brewing Company facility the town's flagship industry, but it announced its closure in 2015. The loss of the brewery and the textile mills had a knock-on effect on local retail stores, many of which closed due to the loss of customers and competition from national chains such as Walmart.

On the third weekend of September; Eden hosts the annual River Fest each year to celebrate Eden's history. The Boone Road Historic District, Bullard-Ray House, Cascade Plantation, Central Leaksville Historic District, Dempsey-Reynolds-Taylor House, First Baptist Church, Dr. Franklin King House-Idlewild, Leaksville Commercial Historic District, Leaksville-Spray Institute, Lower Sauratown Plantation, Mt. Sinai Baptist Church, Site 31RK1, Spray Industrial Historic District, St. Luke's Episcopal Church, Tanyard Shoal Sluice, Three Ledges Shoal Sluice, and Wide Mouth Shoal Sluice are listed on the National Register of Historic Places.

== Geography ==
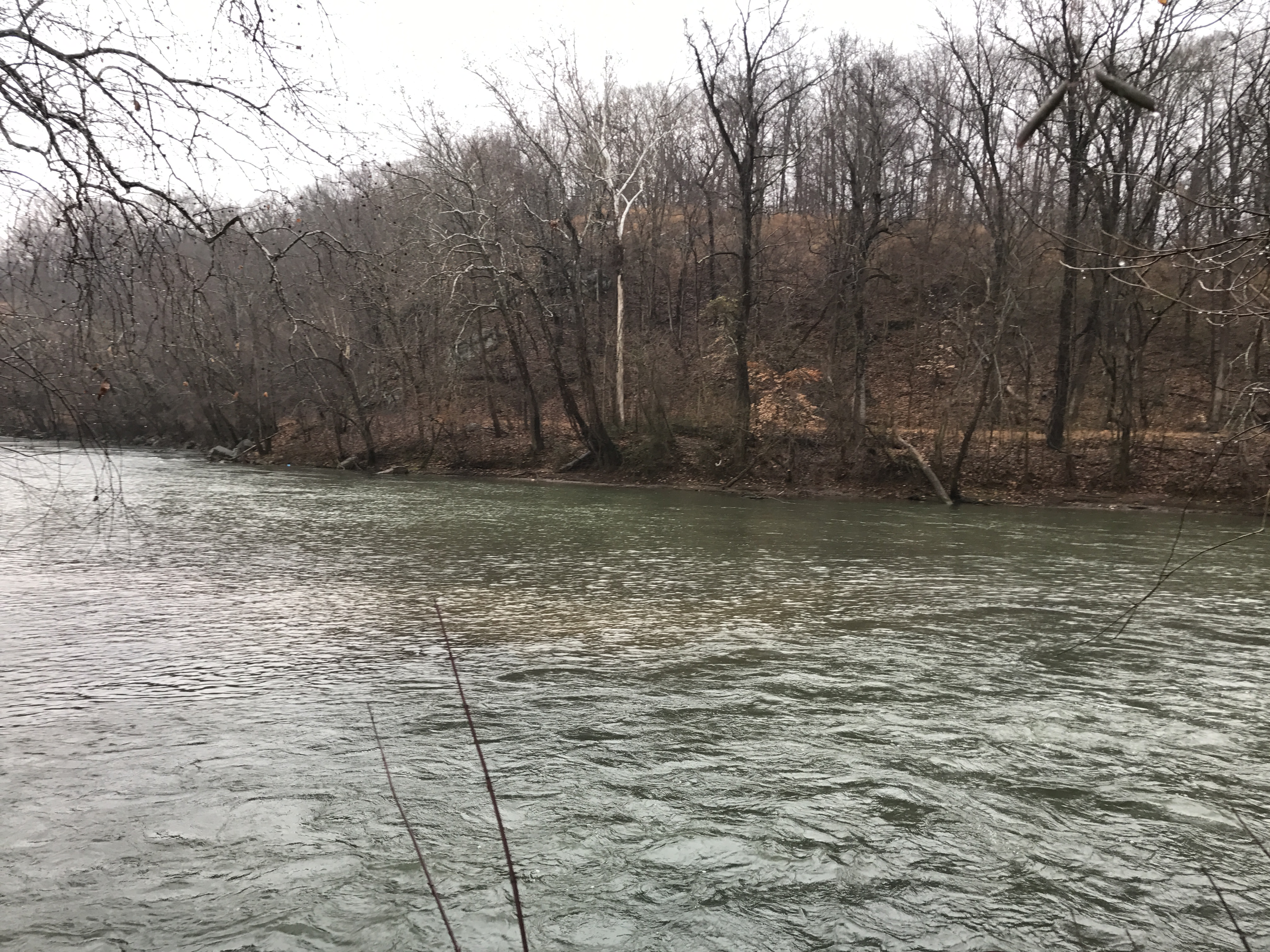
Smith River

The Smith and the Dan River have their confluence on the south side of Eden. The Dan River flows along Eden's southern border while the Smith River flows from the north bisecting the city on its route to meet the Dan River. Greensboro is 36 miles (58 kilometers) to the south, Reidsville is 15 mi (24 km) southeast via NC 14 High Point is 45 miles (72 km) south and Danville, Virginia is 26 mi (42 km) northeast of the city.

According to the United States Census Bureau, the city has a total area of 15.2 square miles (39 km^{2}), of which, 15.0 square miles (39 km^{2}) of it is land and 0.2 square miles (0.52 km^{2}) of it (1.12%) is water.

=== Climate ===
Climate data for Eden, North Carolina (1991–2020)
Month	Jan	Feb	Mar	Apr	May	Jun	Jul	Aug	Sep	Oct	Nov	Dec	Year
Mean daily maximum °F (°C)	49.2 (9.6)	52.9 (11.6)	61.0 (16.1)	71.2 (21.8)	77.9 (25.5)	85.2 (29.6)	88.9 (31.6)	86.5 (30.3)	80.7 (27.1)	71.5 (21.9)	60.6 (15.9)	51.7 (10.9)	69.8 (21.0)
Daily mean °F (°C)	38.0 (3.3)	40.7 (4.8)	47.3 (8.5)	57.2 (14.0)	65.5 (18.6)	73.3 (22.9)	77.3 (25.2)	75.7 (24.3)	69.1 (20.6)	58.5 (14.7)	47.2 (8.4)	40.4 (4.7)	57.5 (14.2)
Mean daily minimum °F (°C)	26.7 (−2.9)	28.6 (−1.9)	33.6 (0.9)	43.2 (6.2)	53.2 (11.8)	61.3 (16.3)	65.7 (18.7)	64.8 (18.2)	57.6 (14.2)	45.5 (7.5)	33.7 (0.9)	29.1 (−1.6)	45.3 (7.4)
Average precipitation inches (mm)	3.83 (97)	3.09 (78)	3.90 (99)	3.91 (99)	4.17 (106)	4.49 (114)	4.08 (104)	4.42 (112)	4.70 (119)	3.72 (94)	3.30 (84)	3.50 (89)	47.11 (1,195)
Average snowfall inches (cm)	1.6 (4.1)	1.2 (3.0)	0.4 (1.0)	0.0 (0.0)	0.0 (0.0)	0.0 (0.0)	0.0 (0.0)	0.0 (0.0)	0.0 (0.0)	0.0 (0.0)	0.0 (0.0)	1.3 (3.3)	4.5 (11.4)
Source: NOAA

=== Neighborhoods ===
List of neighborhoods in Eden include

- Central Area/Meadow Summit
- Fairview
- Sunset Hills
- Fitzgerald/Leaksville Junction
- City Center

== Major industry and economy ==
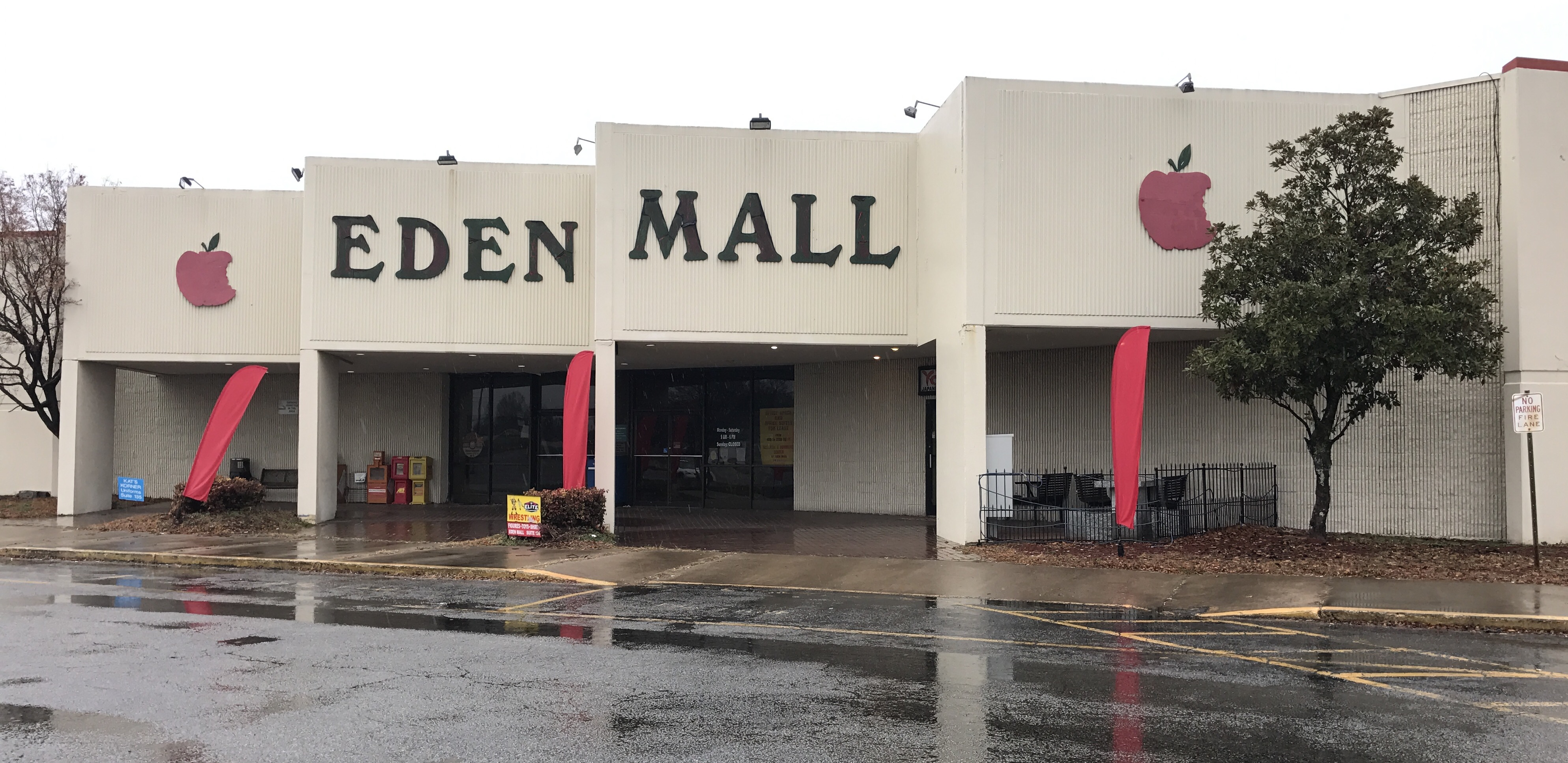
Eden Mall in 2020

Eden has three downtown areas, concentrated in the former towns of Leaksville, Spray, and Draper.

B. Frank Mebane, who had married into the prominent Morehead family, started the first of his six textile mills in the area in 1893. Marshall Field took over the company in 1912 and named it Fieldcrest. The company made textile products that included bedding: sheets and blankets. It employed more than 3000 people. After taking over Cannon Mills in 1986, the company became known as Fieldcrest Cannon; it later moved its headquarters and 110 employees to Kannapolis, North Carolina. Changes and restructuring were affecting the textile industry throughout the South, as companies moved manufacturing operations to areas with cheaper labor, including offshore.

In 1997 Fieldcrest Cannon was sold to Pillowtex. Pillowtex closed its Eden plants in 2003, laying off the last 495 textile workers.

Miller Brewing Company ran a brewery in Eden into the early 21st century. In 2012 it still employed nearly seven hundred people, and produced nine million barrels annually. Miller announced in 2015 that it was shutting down the brewery by September 2016. In September 2020, it was announced Nestle Purina will move into the old MillerCoors facility and will open in 2022.

In 1980, the Eden Mall, an approximately 400,000 square feet shopping center, was constructed. The mall began to decline in the late 1990s when its Kmart store closed. More stores began to shut down, culminating in the departures of Peebles in 2008 and Belk in 2015. The mall's physical condition deteriorated over the following years. It was sold in 2013 and subsequently leased out to local businesses. In the late 2010s, the mall gained media attention and became an example of a "Dead mall" due to lack of stores in the mall and had no anchors left, the mall closed to the public in early 2020s.

== Demographics ==
Historical population
Census	Pop.	Note	%±
1960	3,382		—
1970	15,871		369.3%
1980	15,672		−1.3%
1990	15,238		−2.8%
2000	15,908		4.4%
2010	15,527		−2.4%
2020	15,421		−0.7%
2025 (est.)	15,500	▲	0.5%
U.S. Decennial Census

=== 2020 census ===
As of the 2020 census, Eden had a population of 15,421. The median age was 43.6 years. 21.4% of residents were under the age of 18, and 20.8% were 65 years of age or older. For every 100 females there were 85.5 males, and for every 100 females age 18 and over there were 82.5 males age 18 and over.

96.0% of residents lived in urban areas, while 4.0% lived in rural areas.

There were 6,706 households in Eden, and the census reported 3,976 families residing in the city. Of all households, 27.2% had children under the age of 18 living in them, 35.3% were married-couple households, 20.6% were households with a male householder and no spouse or partner present, and 37.1% were households with a female householder and no spouse or partner present. About 35.4% of all households were made up of individuals, and 15.9% had someone living alone who was 65 years of age or older.

There were 7,740 housing units, of which 13.4% were vacant. The homeowner vacancy rate was 2.7% and the rental vacancy rate was 9.6%.

Eden racial composition
Race	Number	Percentage
White (non-Hispanic)	9,400	60.96%
Black or African American (non-Hispanic)	3,952	25.63%
Native American	62	0.4%
Asian	147	0.95%
Pacific Islander	4	0.03%
Other/Mixed	700	4.54%
Hispanic or Latino	1,156	7.5%

=== 2000 census ===
As of the census of 2000, there were 15,908 people, 6,644 households, and 4,371 families residing in the city. The population density was 1,060.1 people per square mile (409.3 people/km^{2}). There were 7,368 housing units at an average density of 491.0 per square mile (189.6/km^{2}). The racial composition of the city was: 75.43% White, 22.15% Black or African American, 2.34% Hispanic or Latino American, 0.31% Asian American, 0.21% Native American, 0.06% Native Hawaiian or Other Pacific Islander, 1.03% some other race, and 0.81% two or more races.

There were 6,644 households, out of which 28.0% had children under the age of 18 living with them, 45.0% were married couples living together, 16.5% had a female householder with no husband present, and 34.2% were non-families. 31.0% of all households were made up of individuals, and 14.1% had someone living alone who was 65 years of age or older. The average household size was 2.34 and the average family size was 2.90.

In the city, the population was spread out, with 23.1% under the age of 18, 7.8% from 18 to 24, 27.4% from 25 to 44, 22.5% from 45 to 64, and 19.1% who were 65 years of age or older. The median age was 39 years. For every 100 females, there were 85.0 males. For every 100 women age 18 and over, there were 79.4 men.

The median income for a household in the city was $27,670, and the median income for a family was $35,259. Males had a median income of $29,443 versus $21,797 for females. The per capita income for the city was $15,275. About 13.9% of families and 17.2% of the population were below the poverty line, including 22.6% of those under age 18 and 16.6% of those age 65 or over.

The city has three elementary schools, one middle school, and one high school.

== Regional and national awards ==
- All-America City Award - 2011

== Healthcare ==
- UNC Health Rockingham: is a non-profit community hospital serves the surrounding cities within the Rockingham County area and the southern area of Virginia.
- UNC Rockingham Rehabilitation and Nursing Care Center
- UNC Rockingham Wound Healing Center
- Cone Health Medical Group Heartcare of Eden
- UNC Rockingham Outpatient Rehab
- Piedmont Surgical Associates
- UNC Family Medicine at Eden
- Royalty Health and Wellness Resources
- Genesis Medical

== Government ==
The City of Eden operates under a council/manager form type of government. Elected officials include the mayor, elected at-large, and seven council members. The Mayor and City Council serve for a term of Four years. The Mayor is the presiding officer and does not vote if the vote is tied. The Eden City Council meets on the third Tuesday of every month.

On November 12, 2017, Neville Hall took the office of mayor.

Current council members

- Neville Hall, Mayor
- Jerry Ellis, Mayor Pro Tempore and Council Member
- Paul Dishmon, Council Member
- Jason Wood, Council Member
- Greg Light, Council Member
- Bruce Nooe, Council Member
- Kenny Kirkman, Council Member
- Mike Lemons, Council Member

=== Federal, state and county representation ===
For the 119th United States Congress, North Carolina's 5th congressional district is represented by Virginia Foxx (R). Eden is also represented by one member in the North Carolina House of Representatives, Reece Pyrtle (R-65th), and one member in the North Carolina Senate, Phil Berger (R-26th).

== Sports ==
The Leaksville-Draper-Spray Triplets was a former Minor League Baseball team combined from three separate towns in North Carolina. The team played from 1934 through 1942 in the Bi-State League, winning the championship titles in 1935 and 1942 seasons. It was the Affiliate team for various current and former Major League Baseball teams such as, the Chicago Cubs, Cleveland Guardians, and Brooklyn Dodgers.

=== Parks and recreation ===
The city contains the following parks:

- Bridge Street Center
- Freedom Ball Field Complex
- Freedom Park
- John E. Grogan Park
- Mill Avenue Recreation Center
- Mill Avenue swimming pool
- Morgan Road Community Center
- Peter Hill Park
- Washington Street Park
- Spray (Dehart) Community Center
- Smith River Greenway
- Skate Park

== Transportation ==
Eden is provided service by Piedmont Triad International Airport located in nearby Greensboro, North Carolina and Shiloh Airport located in Stoneville, North Carolina. Highways serving Eden include US 311, NC 14, NC 87, NC 135, NC 700, and NC 770. The nearest Interstates to Eden are I-73, I-40, I-85, from closest to furthest. Closest major highway to the city is US 220 / Future I-73, which intersects NC 770 in Stoneville, and NC 135 in Madison.

== Culture ==
=== Festivals and events ===
Each year in September Eden host its annual Fall Riverfest, which celebrates the city's art, history, and river heritage. It is located in the "old" Leaksville shopping district on Washington Street, the oldest downtown street since 1917. Others include: Charlie Poole Music festival, which features music legends such as, Mike Seeger and the Osbourne brothers. The Eden chamber of commerce created the Eden Business Expo, as a venue for local businesses to present career opportunities, products, and services.

=== Eden Museum ===
On September 19, 2009, the museum was officially opened. In 2010, the exhibits were completed. The museum is an initiative of the Eden Preservation Society. The museum reflects on the city's history from the consolidation of Leaksville, Spray, and Draper, Triassic period, Saura Indians, William Byrd, Civil War, World Wars, the Korean War and much more.

=== Smith River Greenway ===
The Smith River Greenway is a walking trail consisted with the Smith River that is 1.5 miles long extending along the Eden Family YMCA located on Kennedy street and Island ford landing filled with plenty of interesting plants and wildlife found in the trail. From a circumference view the Greenway can cross the smith river on Meadow road. Local parking, picnic shelters, and restroom facilities are offered at the trailhead for visiting tourist. The city's next plan for the Greenway is to extend the trail towards the Spray dam.

=== On BoJack Horseman ===
Eden was featured in "The Amelia Earhart Story", the season 5 episode of the Netflix animated series BoJack Horseman. One of the show's characters, Princess Carolyn, is from Eden and returns to her hometown in seeking an adoption from a local girl.

== Education ==
Rockingham County Schools serves the City of Eden. The Rockingham County School System was established in 1993.

=== Elementary schools ===
- Central Elementary School
- Douglas Elementary School
- Draper Elementary School (closed 2019–2020)
- Leaksville-Spray Elementary

=== Middle and high schools ===
- James E. Holmes Middle School
- John Motley Morehead High School

=== Colleges and universities ===
- Rockingham Community College – Wentworth, NC

== Media ==
=== Radio Stations ===
- WLOE at 1490 on the AM dial signed-on in 1946. The call letters stand for "Wonderful Land of Eden." The station is also heard at 92.5 FM.
- WCLW at 1130 broadcasting a Southern gospel format, licensed to Eden.
- WPTI at 94.5 commercial FM talk and sports radio station serving the entire Piedmont Triad, also licensed to Eden.

=== Local newspapers ===
- Greensboro News & Record
- Eden's Own Journal

=== Television stations ===
- WFMY-TV, 2 CBS, Greensboro
- WGHP, 8 Fox, High Point
- WXII-TV, 12 NBC, Winston-Salem
- WGPX, 16, Ion, Burlington
- WGSR-LD, 19 Independent, Reidsville
- WCWG, 20, The CW, Lexington
- WXLV-TV, 45, ABC, Winston-Salem
- WMYV-TV, 48, MyNetworkTV, Greensboro

== Notable people ==
- Clint Barrow, aka Andre Chase, professional wrestler for WWE
- Houston Barrow, aka Lance Bravado, professional wrestler for Ring of Honor wrestling
- Tabitha Brown, actress and internet celebrity
- Bill Butler, NFL player
- Herb Clarke, former weatherman and television journalist for WCAU
- Ben Cook, actor, appeared on NBC's 30 Rock, and HBO's Veep
- Norwood Creek, film and television producer, director and editor
- Antico Dalton, retired NFL and Canadian Football League player, World Bowl and Grey Cup Champion
- N. L. Dillard, educator and principal of Caswell County Training School (later Caswell County High School)
- William Gordon, former bishop of the Episcopal Diocese of Alaska
- R.S. Gwynn, poet
- Carol M. Highsmith, Visual Documentarian of America for the Library of Congress
- Jennifer King, first full-time black female coach in NFL history
- Machinedrum, electronic musician and record producer
- Charlie Poole, old-time banjoist
- Takayo Siddle, college basketball coach
- Edwin Wilson, professor at Wake Forest University
