= Avalon, North Carolina =

Coordinates: 36.424°N 79.952°W

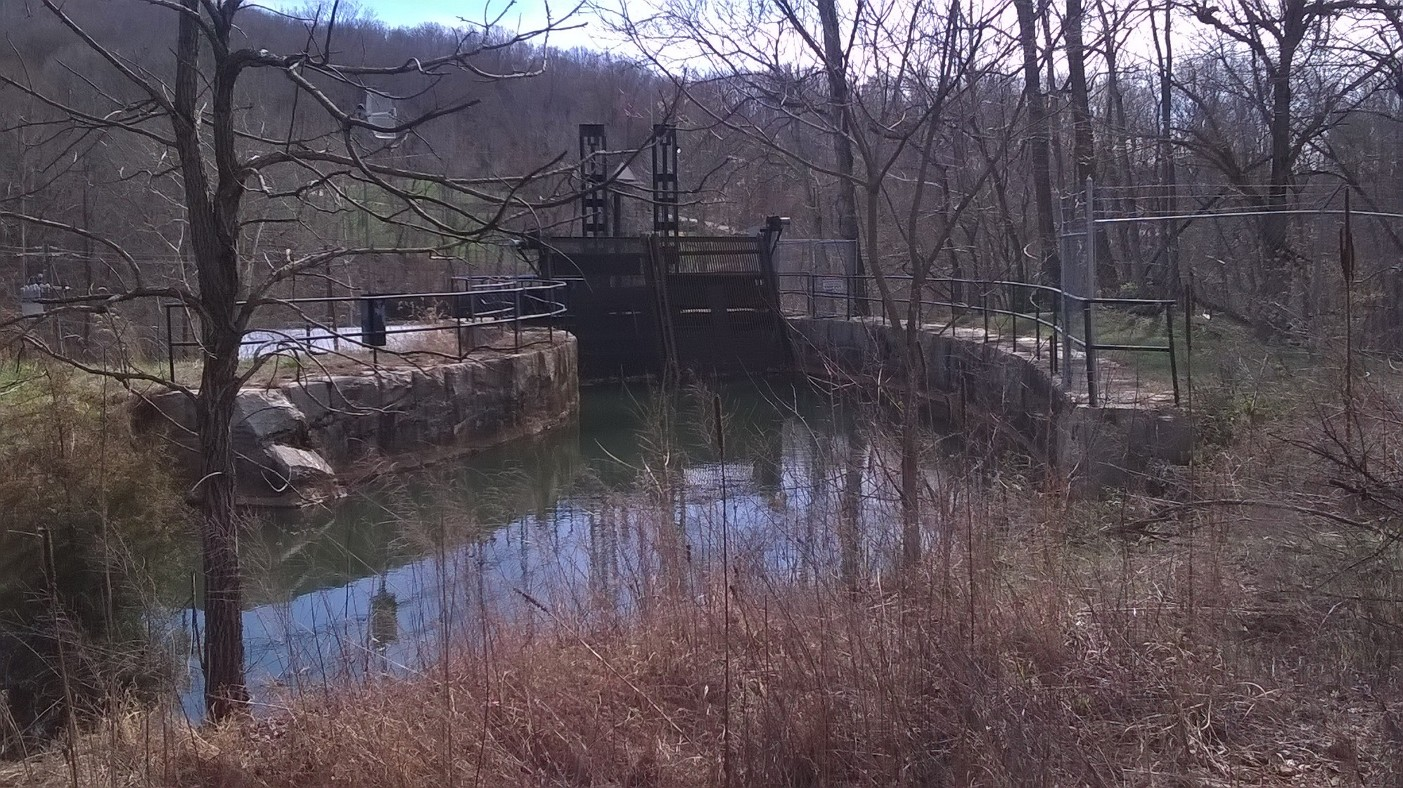
The Avalon Mill bulkhead survived the 1911 fire.

Avalon was a town in Rockingham County, North Carolina, in the United States. It was centered around a textiles mill constructed by Francis Henry Fries at the end of the 19th century. In 1911 the mill burnt down. Most of the population moved their homes to Mayodan, North Carolina and the area was left abandoned.

== History ==
=== Establishment ===
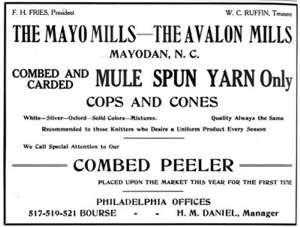
Mayo-Avalon Mills Advertisement from 1910

In 1887, Francis Henry Fries, a prominent businessman from Winston-Salem, constructed the Roanoke and Southern Railway, which stretched from his home town to Roanoke, Virginia. Seeking to develop industry along the rail line, Fries erected the Mayo Mill adjacent to the Mayo River in 1895 and established the town of Mayodan. The Mayo Mill could not keep up with demand for yarn, so from 1899 to 1900 a new mill was built two miles to the north. W. C. Ruffin, the superintendent of the Mayo Mills Company, gave it the name Avalon, after Avalon, California. Construction was undertaken by S. S. Ordway & Sons, an independent contractor. At the time the four-story building was the largest textile mill in North Carolina. The south wall of the main building was made of wooden planks so it could be dismantled to allow for expansions and renovations.

A village arose around the mill, taking its name. It was home to over 450 people, of whom over half worked in the mill. Some residents immigrated from as far as Durham and Raleigh to find employment in Avalon. A few African-Americans also lived at the outskirts of the village and worked in the mill's dye house. In addition to the mill, the town consisted of a dam and artificial canal, 60 company houses, a boarding house, a hotel, a company store, an ice cream parlor and a Moravian Church. The second story floor of the store was used to host a school. Electricity came from a water-powered generator at the mill. No formal government was ever established in Avalon, so most events were either centered around the church or the mill. On November 23, 1908 a fire destroyed the company store, causing an estimated $20,000 in damage.

=== Mill fire and aftermath ===
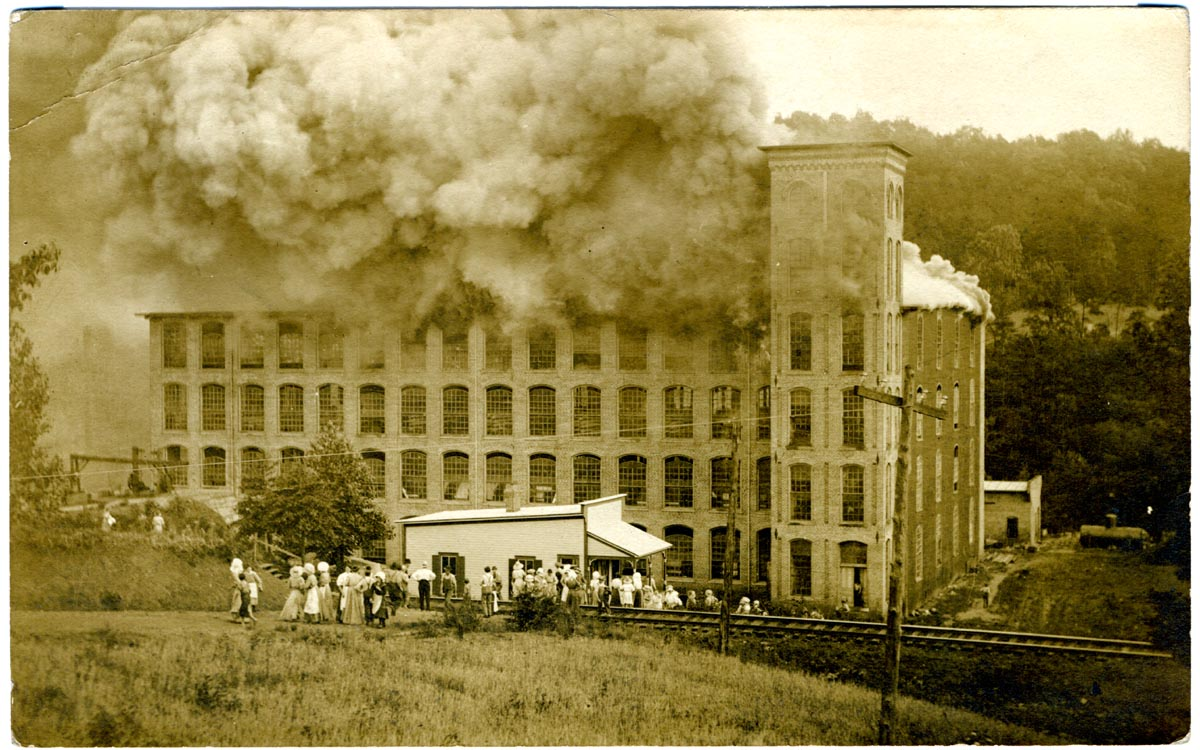
Avalon Mill burning, June 1911

Just before 6 p.m. on June 15, 1911 a spinning mule box on the fourth floor of the mill overheated and caught fire. Wind passing through the open windows fanned the flames and increased the severity of the fire. The mill was just about to close for the day when the fire was discovered, and few employees were in the building at the time. One man vainly attempted to control the blaze by throwing water onto it. The mill had a modern fire sprinkler system, but its water pumps failed and the entire complex burnt down in a few hours. Though it was fully insured, Fries decided not to rebuild it and instead reinvested the insurance payout in the Mayo Mill, transferring his employees and resources there. Almost all of the company houses were put on logs and rolled by mules and horses to Mayodan. By 1913 only the Moravian Church, the mill store, and a single house remained in Avalon. The former two were dismantled and their lumber taken to Mayodan. The house was left behind to host the caretaker of the mill's power plant. In 1916, Fries briefly returned to the site of the mill to dismantle the dyeing equipment and transport it to the Mayo Mill.

The remains of Avalon are situated about a mile from U.S. Route 220 on private property.
