= North Carolina Highway 770 =

State highway in North Carolina, US

North Carolina Highway 770

Route information
- Maintained by NCDOT
- Length: 32.3 mi (52.0 km)

Major junctions
- West end: NC 704 near Sandy Ridge
- US 220 near Stoneville; NC 14 / NC 87 / US 311 in Eden
- East end: US 311 at the Virginia state line near Berry Hill, VA

Location
- Country: United States
- State: North Carolina
- Counties: Stokes, Rockingham

Highway system
- North Carolina Highway System; Interstate; US; State; Scenic
← NC 751	→ NC 772

North Carolina Highway 770 (NC 770) is a 32-mile-long (51 km) state highway running through rural North Carolina and Eden. The road travels from NC 704 near Sandy Ridge to the Virginia state line southwest of Danville. It connects the city of Eden with US Highway 220 in Stoneville. Going east of Eden, NC 770 runs along a concurrency to its eastern terminus with U.S. Route 311 (US 311). Most of the road is two lanes wide. NC 770 is one of the few North Carolina state highways numbered in the 700s.

== Route description ==
NC 770 begins at NC 704 near Sandy Ridge. The road begins to head to the east from the intersections along a two lane road. The road continues through a very rural area of Stokes County, passing by many farms. The road curves around the foothills of North Carolina until reaching the Stoneville area. It crosses over the Mayo River and has an interchange with US 220 before entering downtown Stoneville. NC 770 passes through Stoneville along Main Street. After leaving Stoneville, the road continues through rural Rockingham County before reaching the community of Providence. Shortly before the highway enters Eden, it turns to the left along a bypass south of downtown Eden. NC 770 then forms a concurrency with US 311 before they cross over the Dan River.

The bypass is joined by NC 87 before the right-of-way ends at an intersection with NC 14 southeast of the city. The four roads travel together crossing the Dan River and enter a business district of eastern Eden. At an interchange with Meadow Road, NC 14 and NC 87 continue north while US 311 and NC 770 exit to head east on Meadow Road. At this point, NC 700 begins and travels along US 311 and NC 770 for just over one mile (1.6 km). They head northeast before making a sharp curve to the east at a factory to cross a railroad at-grade. The road soon begins to curve back to the north where NC 770 ends at the Virginia state line; US 311 continues another seven and a half miles (12.1 km) to Danville.

== History ==
NC 770 began in 1930 between US 311 in Stoneville and NC 54 in Leaksville. In 1933 NC 770 was extended east to the Virginia State Line, via the town of Draper. In 1934, the road was extended again to the west, running along US 311 for a couple of miles and then continuing to NC 704. In 1966 the road was straightened to run directly into Stoneville. In 2000 the road was routed along its current routing around Eden.

In 1967 the North Carolina Highway Commission named a seven-mile-long portion of NC 770 the T. Clarence Stone Highway after State Senator T. Clarence Stone.

== Junction list ==
County	Location	mi	km	Destinations	Notes
Stokes	Sandy Ridge	0.0	0.0	NC 704 – Madison	Y intersection
Rockingham		10.6– 10.7	17.1– 17.2	US 220 – Greensboro, Martinsville	Interchnage
Rockingham	Eden	18.5	29.8	US 311 south / NC 135 west – Mayodan, Madison	Western end of US 311 concurrency; eastern terminus of NC 135
Rockingham		21.0	33.8	NC 87 south – Wentworth	Western end of NC 87 concurrency
Rockingham		22.7	36.5	NC 14 south – Reidsville	Western end of NC 14 concurrency
Rockingham	Eden	25.0– 25.2	40.2– 40.6	NC 14 north / NC 87 north / NC 700 begins (West Meadow Road) / Jackson Street – Martinsville	Interchange; eastern end of NC 14 / NC 87 concurrency; western end of NC 700 concurrency
Rockingham	Eden	26.5	42.6	NC 700 east (Fieldcrest Street) / Summit Road – Pelham	Eastern end of NC 700 concurrency
Rockingham		32.3	52.0	US 311 north – Danville	Virginia state line
1.000 mi = 1.609 km; 1.000 km = 0.621 mi: Concurrency terminus

== See also ==
- North Carolina Bicycle Route 4 - Concurrent with NC 770 from its western terminus to Simpson Street in Stoneville
