= Francis Henry Fries =

American industrialist (1855–1931)

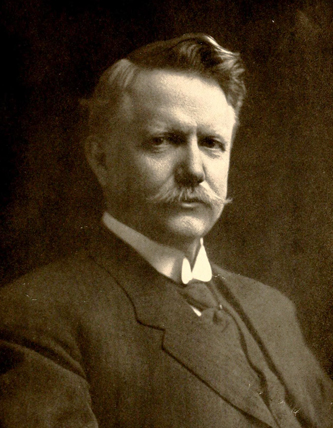

Francis Henry Fries (February 1, 1855 – 5 June 1931) was an American textile businessman and industrialist from North Carolina. The town, Fries in Virginia was named in his honor.

== Early life ==
Fries was born on February 1, 1855, in Winston-Salem, North Carolina. He was the son of Francis Levin Fries and Lisetta Maria Vogler, the descendants of immigrants who came from Saxony under the auspices of the Moravian Church. The family settled in Piedmont, North Carolina, where they purchased 100,000 acres of land from Lord Granville. Fries attended the Salem Boys' School, and later graduated from Davidson College in 1874. His elder sister, Mary Elizabeth Fries, was the second wife of Rufus Lenoir Patterson.

== Career ==
At 21 years old, Fries joined his father's textile firm, F & H Fries Manufacturing Company, working as a mechanic and a blacksmith. During his tenure he would work in all of the company's departments. In 1878, Fries traveled with his brother and uncle to Europe, visiting the United Kingdom, France, Germany, Switzerland, and Italy. Upon his return he was promoted to superintendent. In 1880, Fries constructed a building, adjacent to the company's flour mill. This three-story structure housed the Arista Cotton Mill, a steam-powered facility that operated 3,300 spindles and 180 looms. In the next 20 years, operations would expand to a peak of 7,700 spindles and 450 looms. The Arista Mills became the first textile mill in North Carolina to have electric lighting.

In 1887, Fries left his father's company. He instead opted to undertake an effort to connect Winston-Salem to Roanoke, Virginia by rail to improve commerce. Supervising all financing and construction, Fries completed what became known as the Roanoke and Southern Railway in four years. He served as the railway's first president.

As a Democrat, he served on the staff of Governor Alfred Moore Scales, where he earned the title of "Colonel" which he would use in his professional career to distinguish himself from his father. In 1893, Fries went into banking and became president of the Wachovia Loan and Trust Company. Looking for areas to develop along the Southern Railway, Fries began exploring the possibility of setting up textile mills along the Mayo River. In 1895 he erected the Mayo Mill and established the town of Mayodan. In 1900 Fries purchased rural farmland surrounding Bartlett Falls on the New River in Grayson County, Virginia. He then hired a local labor force to build a dam, a cotton mill and a full-service company owned town. By 1901, the New River Train was extended to the mill site and Fries petitioned the Virginia State Legislature to incorporate the new town of Carico, Virginia. For reasons that are not well documented, the town name was instead legislatively changed to Fries, Virginia and officially incorporated in 1902. In 1904, he was elected president of the North Carolina Bankers Association. From 1911–1912 Fries served as the president of the trust company section of the American Bankers Association. On November 15, 1917 he was appointed to be director of the state branch of the National War Savings Committee.

== Personal life ==
On November 23, 1881 he married Letitia Walker Patterson (1860–1884), a daughter of Rufus Lenoir Patterson and granddaughter of Governor John Motley Morehead. Before her death, they were the parents of one child:

- Louise Morehead Fries (1881–1881), who died in infancy.

In 1886, Fries married Anna Paulina de Schweinitz (1860–1934), a daughter of Emil Adolphus de Scheinitz, a Moravian minister that came to Salem Academy to oversee the school. Together, they were the parents of a daughter:

- Rosa Eleanor Fries (1887–1954), who married Richard Furman Willingham in 1909.

Fries died on June 5, 1931.

== See also ==
- Rufus Lenoir Patterson
