= Mayo River State Park =

Mayo River State Park may refer to:

- Mayo River State Park (North Carolina)
- Mayo River State Park (Virginia)
