= Troublesome Creek (Haw River tributary) =

Stream in North Carolina, USA

Troublesome Creek Tributary to Haw River
- Location of Troublesome Creek mouth Troublesome Creek (Haw River tributary) (the United States)

Location
- Country: United States
- State: North Carolina
- County: Rockingham; Guilford
- City: Stokesdale

Physical characteristics
- Source: divide between Troublesome Creek and Belews Creek
  - location: Stokesdale, North Carolina
  - coordinates: 36°14′49″N 079°59′37″W
  - elevation: 960 ft (290 m)
- Mouth: Haw River
  - location: about 5 miles south of Reidsville, North Carolina
  - coordinates: 36°15′57″N 079°38′35″W
  - elevation: 653 ft (199 m)
- Length: 23.67 mi (38.09 km)
- Basin size: 55.96 square miles (144.9 km^{2})
- Discharge
  - location: Haw River
  - average: 65.59 cu ft/s (1.857 m^{3}/s) at mouth with Haw River

Basin features
- Progression: Haw River → Cape Fear River → Atlantic Ocean
- River system: Haw River
- Tributaries
  - left: unnamed tributaries
  - right: unnamed tributaries
- Waterbodies: Lake Reidsville
- Bridges: NC 68, US 220, Price Mill Road, Haynes Road, Hudson Road, Witty Road, Woolen Store Road, Monroeton Road, US 158, McCoy Road, US 29 Business, US 29

Troublesome Creek is a 23.67 mi (38.09 km) long 3rd order tributary to the Haw River, in Rockingham County, North Carolina.

== Variant names ==
According to the Geographic Names Information System, it has also been known historically as:

- Big Troublesome Creek

== History ==
Troublesome Creek was the location of Native American activity (Cheraw Indians) in the Middle Archaic period and may have been the location of the first European settlement in Rockingham County, North Carolina. The watershed was the site of the Troublesome Creek Iron Works, also known as Speedwell Furnace. Established in 1770, it is considered one of the earliest colonial ironworks. General Nathaniel Greene also camped here during the Guilford Courthouse campaign in 1781. President George Washington also later visited the ironworks in 1791.

== Course ==
Troublesome Creek rises in the City of Stokesdale in Guilford County on the divide between Troublesome Creek and Belews Creek (Dan River). Troublesome Creek then flows northeast into Rockingham County and then southeast to meet the Haw River about 5 miles south of Reidsville, North Carolina. Lake Reidsville is an impoundment of this stream.

== Watershed ==
Troublesome Creek drains 55.96 square miles (144.9 km^{2}) of area, receives about 46.5 in/year of precipitation, has a topographic wetness index of 426.23 and is about 42% forested.

== Natural history ==
The Rockingham County Natural Heritage Inventory recognized three locations in the Troublesome Creek watershed, all of which are county significant. These include 1) Bottomlands of Troublesome Creek, 2) Troublesome Creek Marsh, and 3) Warf Airfield Marsh.

== See also ==
- List of rivers of North Carolina
