= Mayo River State Park (Virginia) =

State park in Virginia, United States

- IUCN category V (protected landscape/seascape)
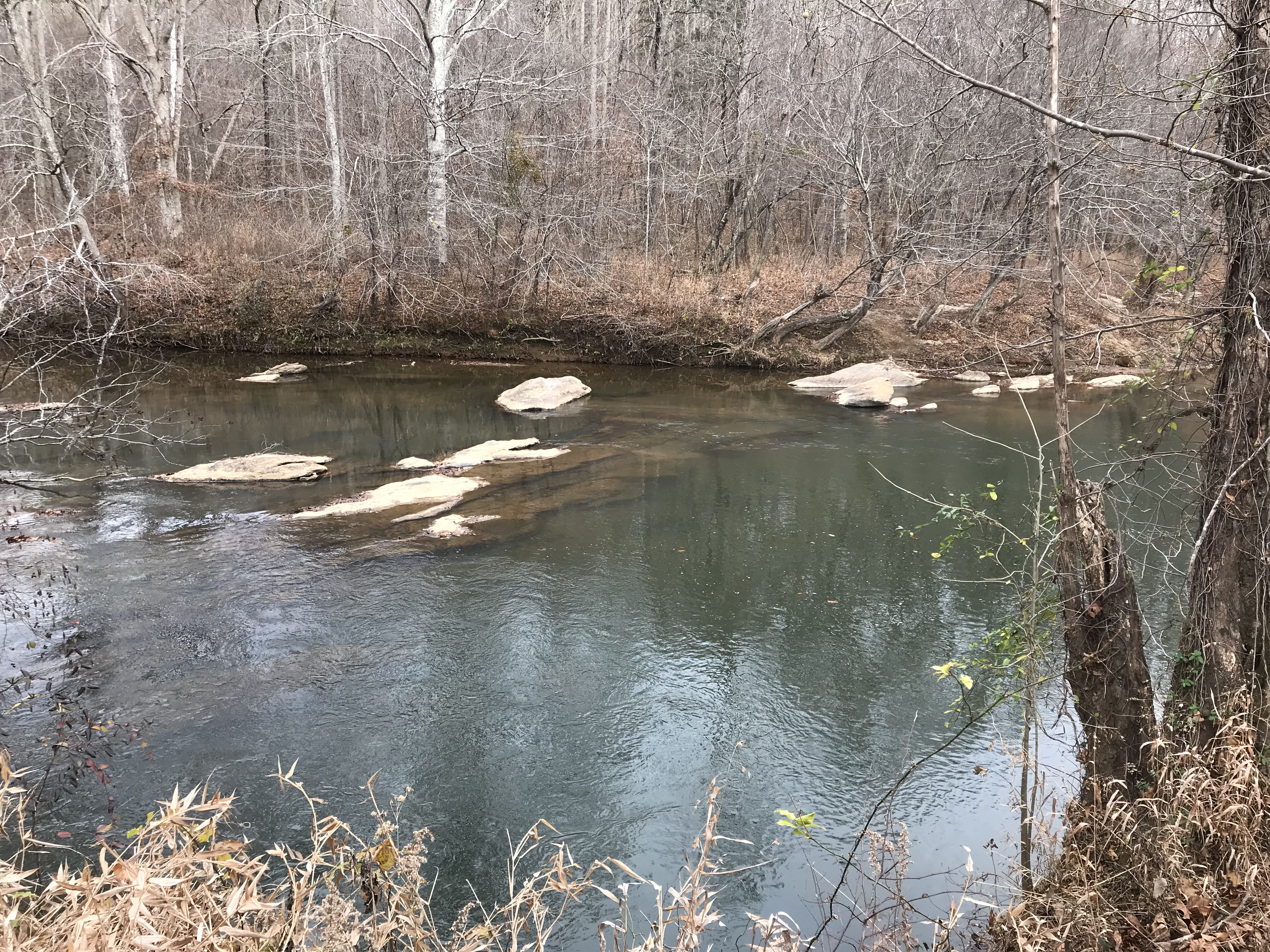
- Mayo River

- Location within Virginia Location within the United States
- Location: Henry County, Virginia, US
- Nearest city: Spencer
- Coordinates: 36°33′18″N 79°59′59″W
- Area: 637 acres (258 ha)
- Established: August 2009
- Governing body: Virginia Department of Conservation and Recreation
- Website: Mayo River State Park

Mayo River State Park is a state park of Virginia located in Henry County, along the North and South Forks of the Mayo River. The entrance to the park is located in Spencer. The park is located along the Virginia-North Carolina state line, and it is adjacent to a similarly named park in North Carolina.

== History ==
In May 2003, the North Carolina General Assembly authorized a state park along the Mayo River, from the Virginia-North Carolina state line, to the river's confluence with the Dan River.

In 2007 the Virginia General Assembly commissioned a feasibility study for the creation of a state park from its Department of Conservation and Recreation (DCR). The study concluded that a park was feasible and proposed the North and South Mayo Rivers as candidates for inclusion in the state's scenic river system.

The North Mayo River, from Route 695 to the North Carolina line, and the South Mayo River, from the Patrick County line to the North Carolina line, were added to the Virginia Scenic Rivers Program in 2008.

In August 2009, DCR acquired a 332-acre (134 ha) tract, as its first land purchase for the park.

In 2013, North Carolina sold to Virginia portions of property it had acquired for its state park, which crossed the state line.

In 2019, Virginia acquired 214 acres with the assistance of the Piedmont Land Conservancy.

Ground was broken for park facilities in October, 2021, with a planned opening in 2022.

On Earth Day, April 22, 2022, Virginia State Parks formally opened a trailhead off Pratt Road to the public, which provides access to three hiking and cycling trails.

== Recreation ==
The park's initial public facilities are limited to a trailhead and a 3.9-mile (6.3 km) multi-use trail system.

The 1.9-mile (3.1 km) Mayo River Trail is the back bone of the trail system. It follows the park's main service road, which roughly runs along the ridge between the North and South Forks of the Mayo River, to their confluence in North Carolina.

The 0.5-mile (0.80 km) Byrd's Loop Trail creates a loop at the end of the Mayo River Trail, which runs alongside the North Mayo River. The loop passes Byrd's Ledge, a rock formation in the river at the North Carolina-Virginia state line. It is named after William Byrd II, who camped near it during the surveying of the line and wrote about the area.

The 1.3-mile (2.1 km) Redbud Trail forms a loop in the northwest corner of the park.

== See also ==
- List of Virginia state parks
