= Mayo River State Park (North Carolina) =

State park in North Carolina, United States

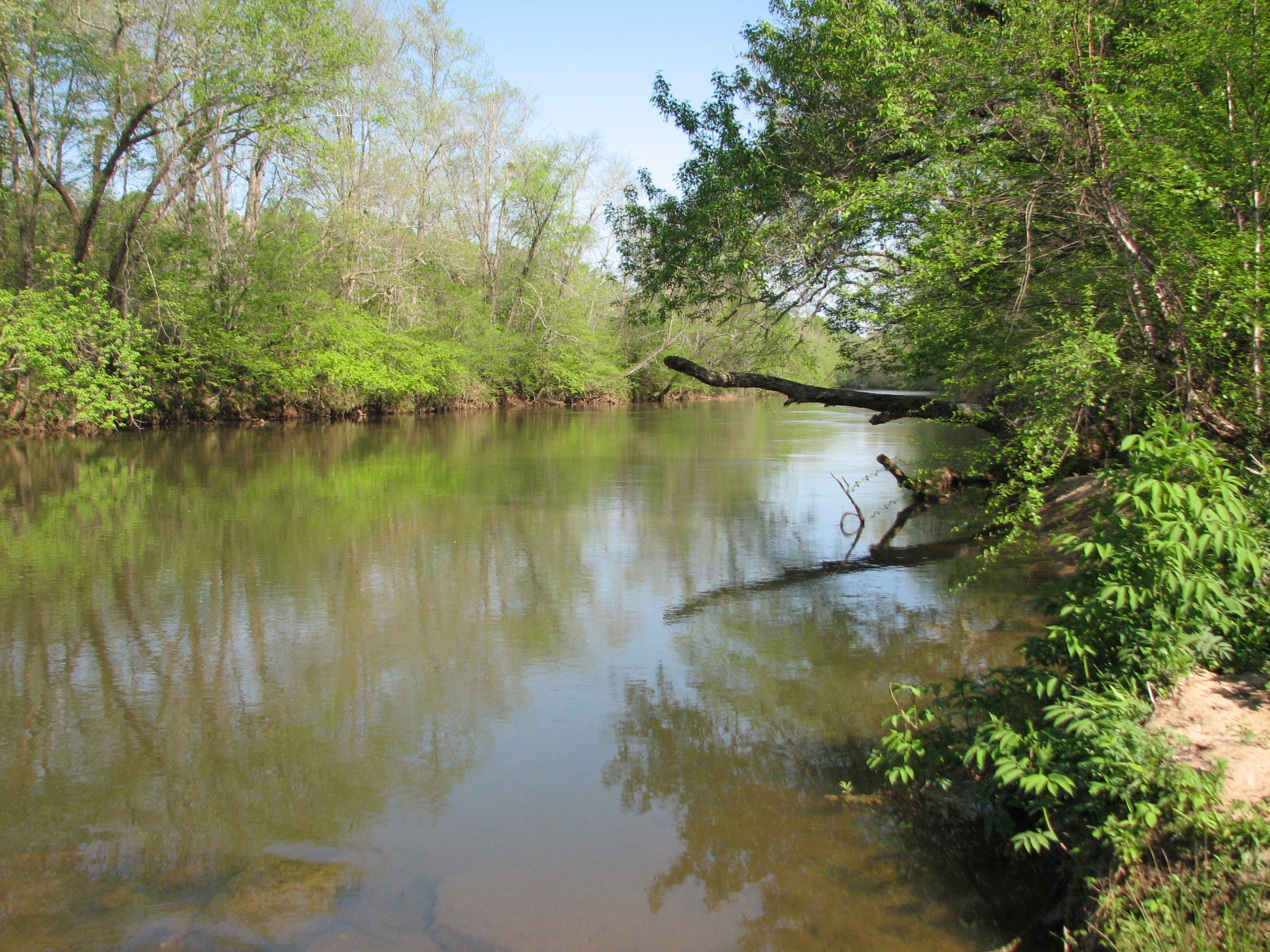
- U.S. 220 access to Mayo River State Park

- Location within North Carolina Location within the United States
- Location: Rockingham County, North Carolina, United States
- Coordinates: 36°26′20″N 79°56′17″W
- Area: 2,778 acres (1,124 ha)
- Established: May 31, 2003
- Administrator: North Carolina Division of Parks and Recreation
- Website: Official website

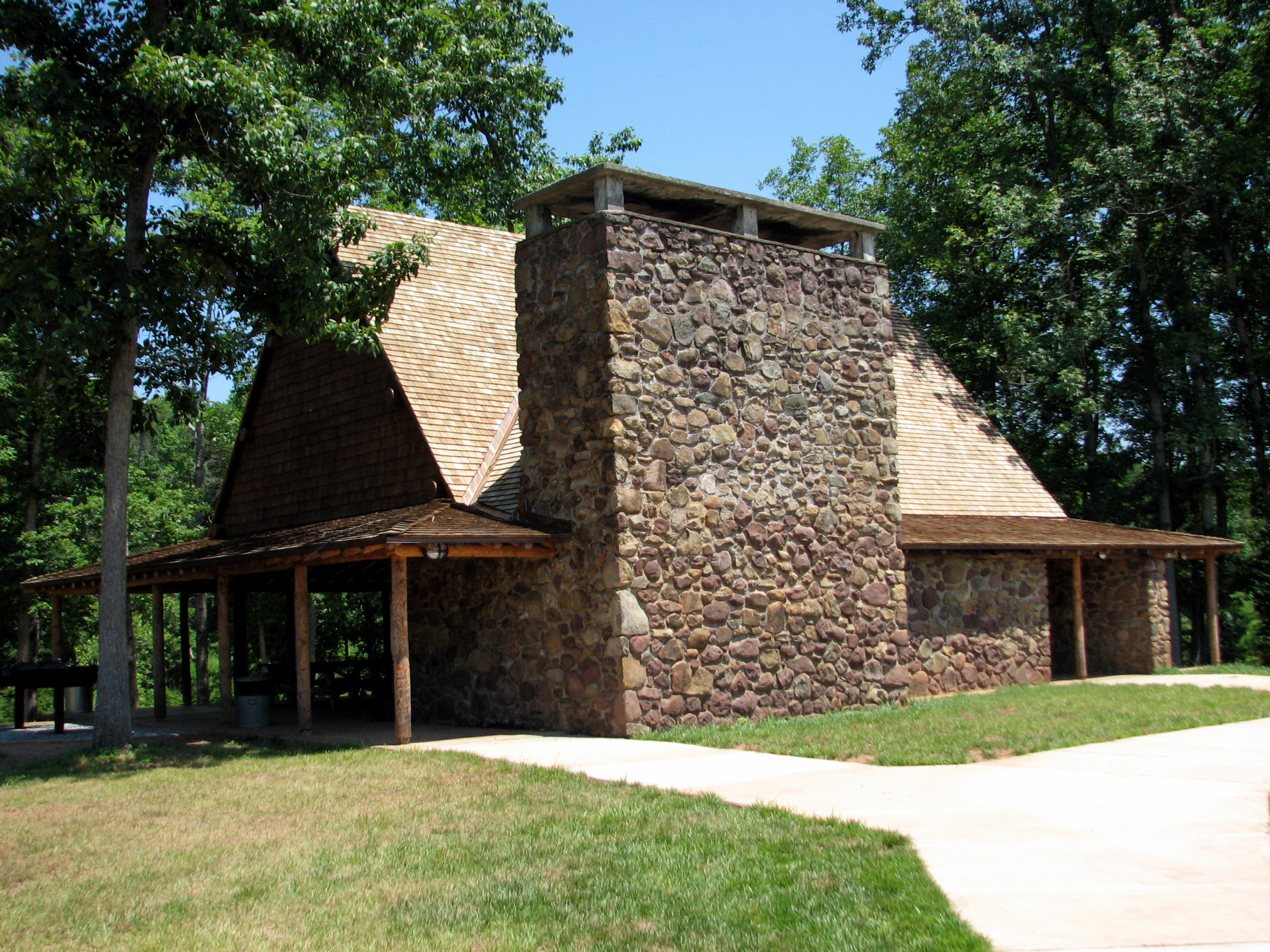
Antonin Raymond's picnic shelter

Mayo River State Park is a North Carolina state park in Rockingham County, North Carolina in the United States. It covers 2,778-acre (11.24 km^{2}) along the Mayo River, and it adjoins a Virginia State Park of the same name. North Carolina's park is near Mayodan, North Carolina. The park is one of the newest in the North Carolina system, having been authorized by the General Assembly in May 2003.

== History ==
In May 2003, the North Carolina General Assembly authorized a state park along the Mayo River, from the Virginia-North Carolina state line, to the river's confluence with the Dan River.

The Mayo Mountain Access was opened to the public on April 1, 2010, as an interim facility.

For the first decade of its existence, the park struggled to obtain land with access to the river's edge. Most of the state's initial park properties were above the river, where it may be seen, but not reached.

In 2016, Piedmont Land Conservancy (PLC) acquired a 354-acre (143 ha) tract from Mayo Properties LLC, which ran along both sides the Mayo River for 3 miles (4.8 km). The tract was originally assembled by investors in the 1950s, with plans to dam the Mayo as a water reservoir for the City of Greensboro. The plans never came into fruition, as Greensboro aided the development of the Randleman Reservoir on the Deep River instead. Duke Energy aided PLC, with a $1.1 million grant for the purchase of the property, as part of their restoration activity for the 2014 Dan River coal ash spill.

In 2019, PLC acquired another 64-acre (26 ha) tract, which included Mayo Beach and the Boiling Hole. A former property of Washington Mills Company, the linear track consists of 1.2 miles (1.9 km) of the river's right and left banks, and it tied several existing park parcels together. Duke Energy provided a $363,000 grant for the acquisition.

== Recreation ==
Mayo River State Park consists of multiple, disconnected access areas spread along the river.

=== Mayo Mountain access ===
The park's principal public access area is the Mayo Mountain Access, near Mayodan.

The access was once a corporate facility, formally known as Mayo Park, which was opened by the Washington Mills Company in 1948. Architect Antonin Raymond designed the original Mayo Park, which included a picnic shelter, a fishing pond, a swimming pond with a beach and a bathhouse. The state renovated and restored some of the existing structures from the former park, while trying to maintain a style compatible with Raymond's design. By the time North Carolina State Parks obtained the property, Raymond's bathhouse had degraded beyond repair. A restroom building resembling the former bathhouse's design was constructed in its place, and materials salvaged from the bathhouse were incorporated into it. The diving platform and other swimming facilities were removed from the swimming pond.

The core of the access area consists of a visitor contact station, two picnic shelters, a small picnic area, two catch and release fishing ponds, a restroom building and a trailhead. The 1.8 miles (2.9 km) Mayo Mountain Loop Trail starts at the picnic area, and it leads hikers along the ridge of Mayo Mountain. The trail does not reach the summit, which is private property. The 0.5-mile (0.80 km) Inner Loop Trail is formed by a shortcut of the Mayo Mountain loop, which avoids ascending the mountain. The access area also has a 40-person group campground set away from the rest of the park facilities.

=== Deshazo Mill access ===
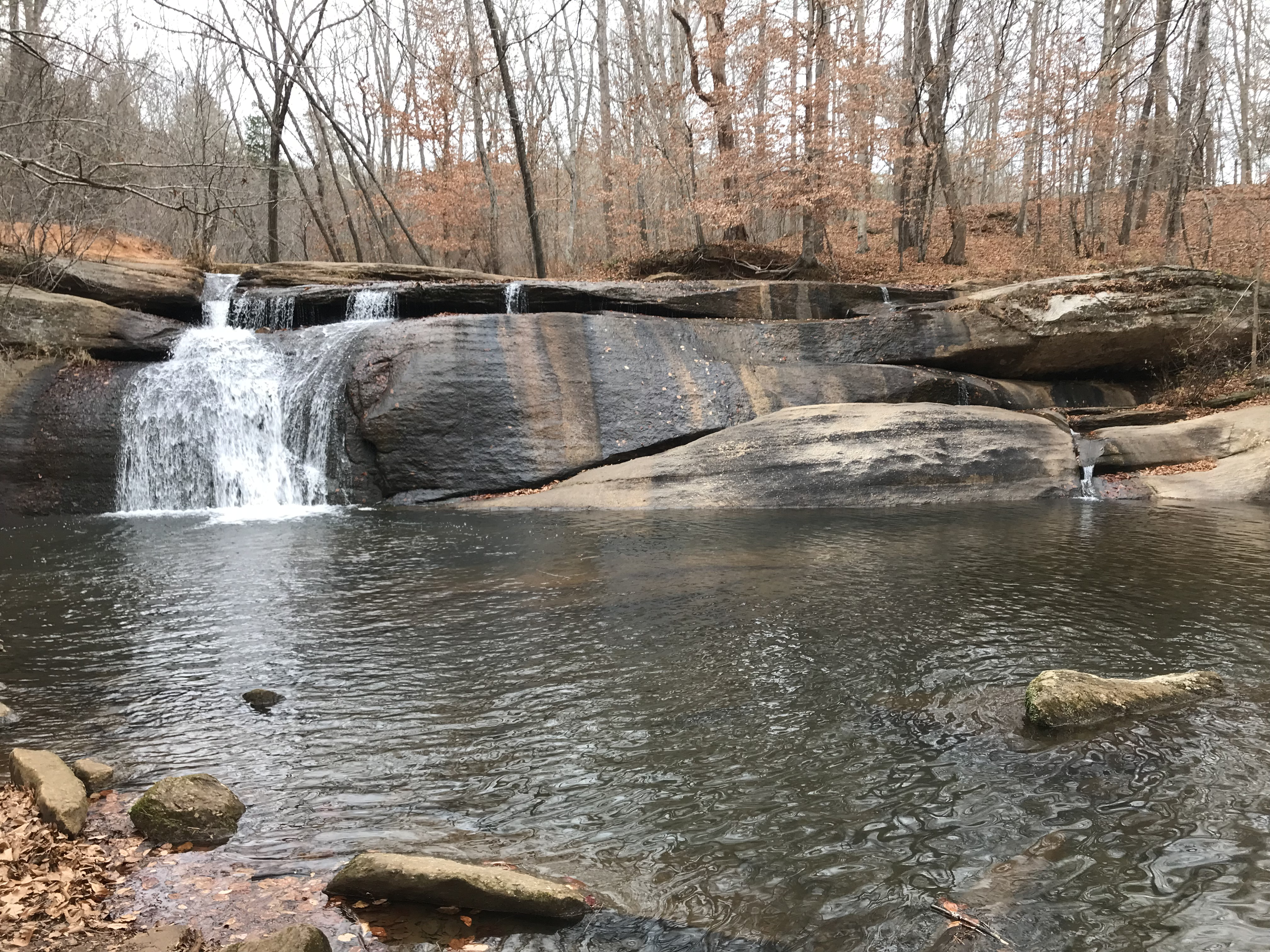
Fall Creek Falls

The park's Deshazo Mill access is its northernmost and second-developed area. The access has a small parking and picnic area, which serve as the trailhead for the Mayo River Trail. The trail takes hikers past Fall Creek Falls, before reaching the Mayo River. The trail then turns north and passes by the confluence of the North and South Forks of the Mayo, and it formally ends at Bryd's Ledge. Named for Mr Bryd, the rock formation in the North Mayo River was a landmark when the North Carolina–Virginia state line was surveyed. An informal trail continues on into Virginia's Mayo River State Park.

=== Anglin Mill access ===
The Anglin Mill access, also known as Mayo Beach, is along a naturally sandy bank of the river. The beach is a popular local swimming area, and upstream of the beach is a Class III rapid, called the Boiling Hole. This stretch of the river is commonly used for playboating, due to its ease of access.

=== Hickory Creek access ===
The Hickory Creek access provides hikers an informal trailhead near Hickory Creek and a 0.75-mile (1.21 km) trail which leads to the river.

=== Mayodan access ===
Close to downtown Mayodan, the Mayodan access provides a primitive put-in for kayaks and canoes.

== Virginia's Mayo River State Park ==
After North Carolina began development of its state park, the State of Virginia studied the creation of its own adjoining state park in 2007. The Virginia Department of Conservation and Recreation concluded the park was feasible, and in 2009 it acquired an initial 332-acre (134 ha) tract adjoining North Carolina's park. Virginia proposed merging the two parks together into an 'interstate park'; however, North Carolina declined, preferring a separate but cooperative approach to park management. Some of the properties North Carolina acquired for its park, extended into Virginia. To aid with the growth of Virginia's park, North Carolina kept its out-of-state landholdings until Virginia could purchase them in 2013. In October 2021, Virginia broke ground on visitor facilities for its park, and it opened a multi-use trail system to the public on Earth Day, April 22, 2022.
