= VA87 =

VA-87 has the following meanings:

- Attack Squadron 87 (U.S. Navy)
- State Route 87 (Virginia)
