= Deep Springs Plantation =

Plantation house in Stoneville, North Carolina

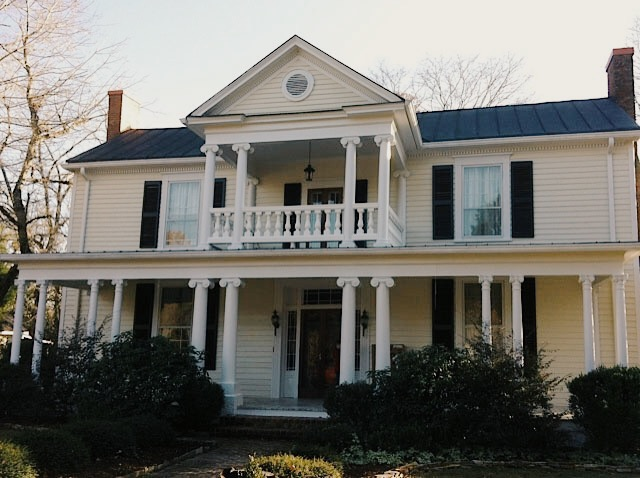
- front view of the house
- Interactive map of the Deep Springs Plantation area

General information
- Type: residence
- Location: Stoneville, North Carolina, United States
- Coordinates: 36.4025°N 79.8787°W
- Current tenants: Byerly family
- Named for: natural spring on the property
- Groundbreaking: 1827

Deep Springs Plantation is a plantation house in Stoneville, North Carolina, United States. The farmland was later sold off to create the Deep Springs Country Club, a golf club and residential neighborhood, but the original house still exists as a private residence.

== History ==
In 1824, land along the Dan River was left to James Madison Scales after his father, Nathaniel Scales, died. In November 1825, Scales married Elizabeth Lesuer at Lennox Castle and they later settled on the land along the river. The plantation is named after a deep spring on the property that supplied water to the house. In 1846, an apatite meteorite weighing approximately twenty-five pounds fell near the house, and is now on display at the North Carolina Museum of History. The mansion was constructed between 1827 and 1830, in time for the couple's second child, Nathaniel, to be born in the house. Scales' siblings owned other plantations in Rockingham County, North Carolina including his brother Alfred Moore Scales at Mulberry Island Plantation and his sister Mary Scales McCain at High Rock Farm.

In 1880 the plantation was sold to John M. Lindsay. The house was later sold to the Armfield family. In 1969 the plantation was sold and the land was turned into a private country club, Deep Springs Country Club. The house was bought in 2003 by the Byerly family and is maintained as a private residence.
