= North Carolina Highway 14 =

State highway in Rockingham County, North Carolina, US

North Carolina Highway 14

Route information
- Maintained by NCDOT
- Length: 17.3 mi (27.8 km)
- Existed: 1968–present

Major junctions
- South end: US 29 / US 158 near Reidsville
- US 311 / NC 87 near Eden
- North end: SR 87 at the Virginia state line near Eden

Location
- Country: United States
- State: North Carolina
- Counties: Rockingham

Highway system
- North Carolina Highway System; Interstate; US; State; Scenic
← US 13	→ US 15

North Carolina Highway 14 (NC 14) is a primary state highway in the U.S. state of North Carolina entirely in Rockingham County. It links US 29/US 158 near Reidsville with the city of Eden. From Eden, it continues north concurrent with NC 87 to the Virginia state line where the road continues as Virginia State Route 87 (SR 87).

== Route description ==
NC 14 begins at exit 153 of the US 29 freeway east of Reidsville. US 29 in this area is proposed to become part of I-785. US 158 heads east from this point but NC 14 and US 158 travel in a northwestern direction through woodlands as a four-lane wide highway with a center turn lane. The road enters the city after a one-quadrant interchange with East Market Street and passing under a railroad. The route then crosses US 29 Business, where US 158 leaves the right of way to the west, following US 29 Business. NC 14 then exits the city after passing through a small commercial strip, entering a mix of woods, homes, and farmland. The road through here remains a five-lane roadway. Most junctions here are at-grade intersections though the northernmost junction with Bethlehem Church Road, an overpass carries the road over NC 14 with a single on-ramp to NC 14 southbound. After a long, straight stretch, the route intersects US 311, NC 87, and NC 770 (Harrington Highway) just before it crosses the Dan River and enters Eden.

The four roads pass through eastern Eden as Van Buren Road along a commercial strip as a five-lane arterial road. It interchanges with Meadow Road at a partial cloverleaf interchange, where US 311 and NC 770 exit off to the east and NC 700 begins east. NC 14 and NC 87 narrow to two lanes and begin to curve to the west, intersecting many of the city's streets and paralleling the Smith River. Northwest of the city, the road intersects a former alignment of NC 87. At the Virginia state line, NC 87 and NC 14 end and the road becomes VA 87 to continue to Ridgeway, Virginia, south of Martinsville, Virginia.

== History ==
The original NC 14 was renumbered to NC 86 in the 1940 renumbering that matched North Carolina route numbers to those of Virginia. NC 65 was renumbered to NC 14 concurrently with that change. In 1968, most of NC 14 was rebuilt as a new roadway, though it still connected Reidsville with Eden.

== Major intersections ==
The entire route is in Rockingham County.

Location	mi	km	Destinations	Notes
	0.0– 0.1	0.0– 0.16	US 29 (future I-785) / US 158 east – Greensboro, Danville, Yanceyville	Exit 153 (US 29); south end of US 158 overlap
	1.9	3.1	East Market Street	One-quadrant interchange
Reidsville	2.5	4.0	US 29 Bus. / US 158 west (Freeway Drive) – Reidsville, Danville	North end of US 158 overlap
	10.1	16.3	US 311 south / NC 87 south / NC 770 west (Harrington Highway)	South end of US 311/NC 87/NC 770 overlap
Eden	12.4– 12.7	20.0– 20.4	US 311 east / NC 700 west / NC 770 east (Meadow Road)	North end of US 311/NC 770 overlap; western terminus of NC 700; interchange
	15.4	24.8	Fisher Hill Road	One-quadrant interchange
	17.3	27.8	SR 87 north (Morehead Avenue) – Ridgeway	Northern terminus; Virginia state line
1.000 mi = 1.609 km; 1.000 km = 0.621 mi: Concurrency terminus
