= Oregon Hill, North Carolina =

- Unincorporated community
- Interactive map of Oregon Hill, North Carolina
- Coordinates: 36°26′55″N 79°38′13″W
- Country: United States
- State: North Carolina
- County: Rockingham
- Elevation: 781 ft (238 m)
- Time zone: UTC-5 (Eastern (EST))
  - Summer (DST): UTC-4 (EDT)
- ZIP code: 27326
- Area code: 336
- GNIS feature ID: 991685

Oregon Hill is an unincorporated community in Rockingham County, North Carolina, United States.
