= Troublesome Creek Ironworks =

- U.S. National Register of Historic Places
- Nearest city: Monroeton, North Carolina
- Area: 35 acres (14 ha)
- Built: c. 1770
- NRHP reference No.: 72000989
- Added to NRHP: September 29, 1972

Troublesome Creek Ironworks, originally called Speedwell Furnace, is a historic iron furnace and archaeological site located near Monroeton, Rockingham County, North Carolina. The ironworks were established by 1770, and remained in operation into the early 20th century. After the Battle of Guilford Courthouse on March 15, 1781, General Nathanael Greene's troops camped at the ironworks to plan for a second attack by Cornwallis. George Washington visited the ironworks during his southern tour of 1791.

It was listed on the National Register of Historic Places in 1972.
