= Mulberry Island Plantation =

Plantation house in Stoneville, North Carolina

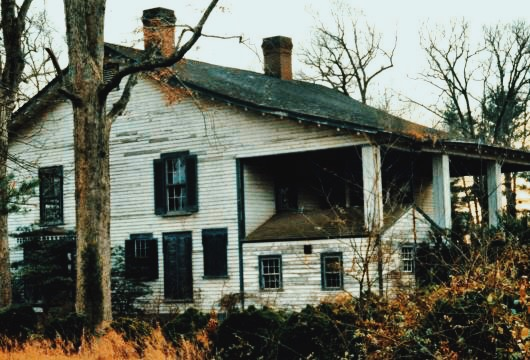
- side view of the house
- Interactive map of the Mulberry Island Plantation area
- Alternative names: Penn Farm

General information
- Type: residence
- Location: Stoneville, North Carolina, US
- Coordinates: 36.4101°N 79.8618°W

Mulberry Island, also known as the Penn Farm, is a historic plantation house in Stoneville, North Carolina near the Dan River. The home was once the seat of the Scales family and the Settle family, two prominent North Carolinian political dynasties. The house was part of a 1,298 acre plantation.

== History ==
Mulberry Island was a large plantation located along the Dan River in Rockingham County, near Stoneville and Leaksville. The house was built by Nathaniel Scales (1756–1824) and his wife, who was a niece of Colonial Governor Josiah Martin. It faces south, looking down on the river valley. The plantation sat on 1,298 acres. Scales left Mulberry Island to his son, Alfred Moore Scales, upon his death. It adjoined Deep Springs Plantation on the Dan River, which was home to another one of Nathaniel Scales' sons, James Madison Scales. Nathaniel Scales' daughter inherited another nearby farm, High Rock Farm. In the 1850s the plantation came into the Settle family. It was the home of North Carolina Supreme Court Associate Justice and United States Minister to Peru, Thomas B. Settle II. After the Settles, the plantation was owned by the Trogden family and then by John Moore. In 1930 the farm was purchased by Charlie Penn of Reidsville, North Carolina who remodeled the house, adding a large porch and other additions. Edrington Penn sold the home to Horner Grogan, who leased it to his son Wendell Grogan. The Grogan family sold the plantation to Charles Stone of Kinston for $130,000.
