= Monroeton, North Carolina =

Unincorporated community in the US

Coordinates: 36°17′22″N 79°44′05″W

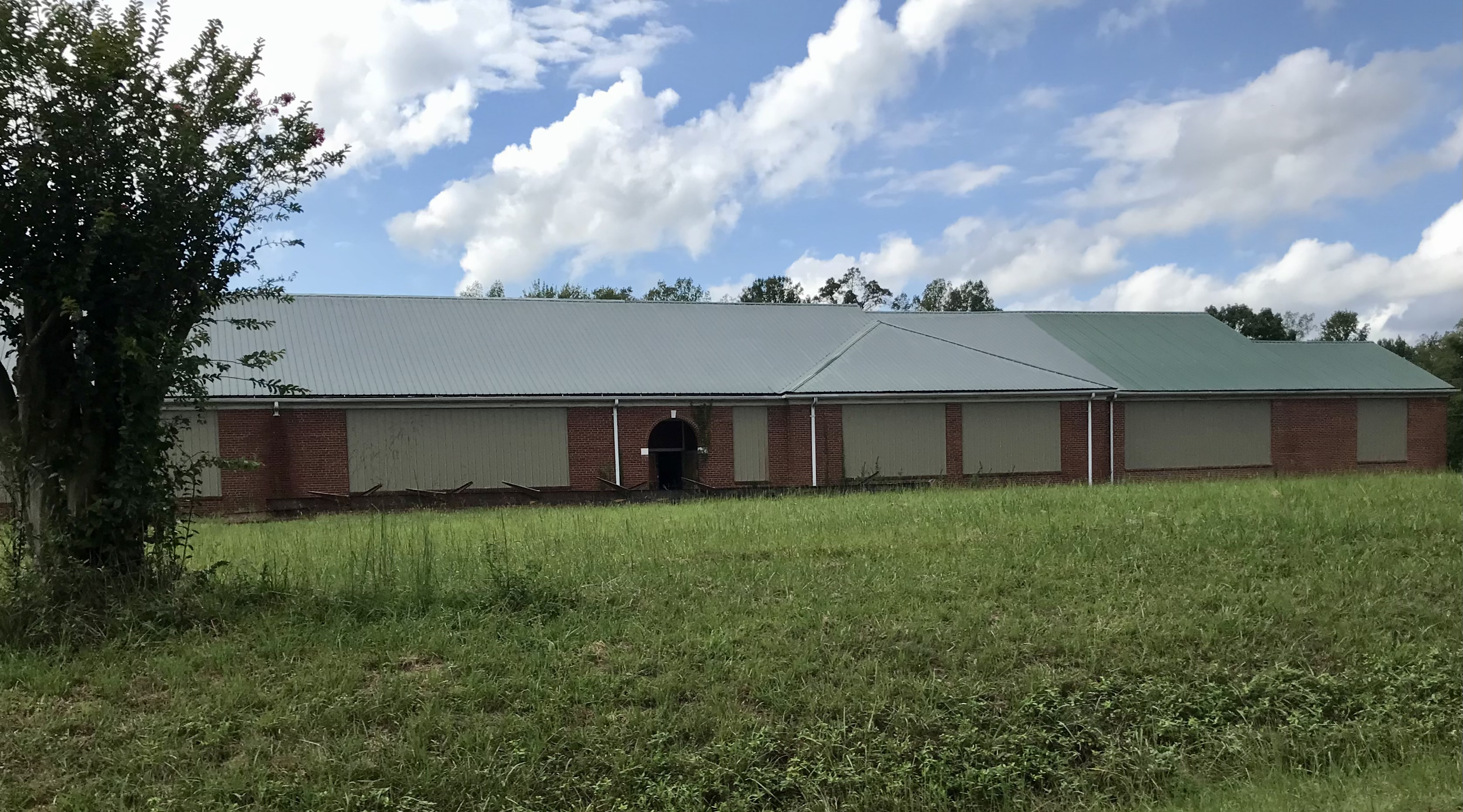
Former Monroeton School

Monroeton is an unincorporated community in Rockingham County, North Carolina, United States. It has a combination fire department staffed by 28 volunteers and five part-time staff and consisting of two engines, two tankers, a pumper/tanker and a rescue and brush unit. The department is certified as ISO class 7. The community is located on U.S. Route 158 at the western end of Flat Rock Road. It is the home of Monroeton Golf Club, the Bar-S-Ranch nudist resort, Haw River State Park and a Methodist summer camp.

The Troublesome Creek Ironworks was listed on the National Register of Historic Places in 1972.
