= High Rock Farm =

Historic house in North Carolina, United States

- U.S. National Register of Historic Places
- Location within North Carolina Location within the United States
- Location: SE of Reidsville on SR 2619, near Williamsburg, North Carolina
- Coordinates: 36°15′36″N 79°34′0″W
- Area: 9 acres (3.6 ha)
- Built: early 1800s
- Architectural style: Federal
- NRHP reference No.: 74001373
- Added to NRHP: April 26, 1974

High Rock Farm is a historic plantation house located in Rockingham County, North Carolina. It dates to the early-19th century, and is a two-story, central hall plan, Federal-style brick dwelling with a rear ell. It sits on a full basement and has a hipped roof. The front facade features a pedimented portico supported by two stuccoed columns and with a gallery at the second level.

Nathaniel Scales, who had also owned Deep Springs Plantation and Mulberry Island Plantation, left High Rock to his daughter, Mary Scales McCain after his death in 1824. Mary Scales was married to the great-great-great-grandfather of U.S. Senator John McCain.

It was listed on the National Register of Historic Places in 1974.
