= General Tobacco =

American former tobacco company

General Tobacco, formerly known as the Vibo Corporation, was a tobacco company based in Mayodan, North Carolina. Founded by Vidal Suriel in 1997, with its first brand reaching the market in 2000, the company was once point the fifth-largest tobacco company in the United States.

Known for the Bronco, Silver, and GT-One brands, General Tobacco specialized in low-cost brands, but the company's market share was undercut in its final years of production by other discounters. In addition, the company was a late participant in the Tobacco Master Settlement Agreement, joining the agreement nearly six years after the agreement was originally put in place. The company later claimed that while joining the agreement was essential to have access to the American market, by signing late they were forced to pay a larger amount than the 19 original signatories, and that it was "misled" into participating. The company was eventually barred from selling its brands in several states because it was unable to meet back payments for cigarette sales before 2004, as was required by the agreement. Due to these and other factors, General Tobacco ceased production at the end of 2010, although representatives of the company were still pursuing legal options as recently as 2012.
