= KSIF =

KSIF may refer to:

- KSIF (FM), a radio station (91.7 FM) licensed to serve Wellington, Texas, United States
- Rockingham County NC Shiloh Airport (ICAO code KSIF)
