= North Carolina Highway 700 =

State highway in North Carolina, US

North Carolina Highway 700

Route information
- Maintained by NCDOT
- Length: 19.0 mi (30.6 km)
- Existed: 1934–present

Major junctions
- West end: US 311 / NC 14 / NC 87 / NC 770 in Eden
- East end: US 29 in Pelham

Location
- Country: United States
- State: North Carolina
- Counties: Rockingham, Caswell

Highway system
- North Carolina Highway System; Interstate; US; State; Scenic
← NC 694	→ US 701

North Carolina Highway 700 (NC 700) is a primary state highway in the U.S. state of North Carolina. The highway runs east–west from Eden to U.S. Route 29 (US 29) in Pelham.

== Route description ==
NC 700 is a rural two-lane highway, starting in Eden, where it starts along a concurrency with US 311 and NC 770. The western terminus is at an interchange where in addition to US 311 and NC 770 passing through, NC 14 and NC 87 pass north and south. The three roads run together for over one mile (1.6 km) before NC 700 heads south along Fieldcrest Street. It goes southeast out of the Eden city limits then northeast through a mix of forest and farmland. It ends at an interchange with US 29 (future Interstate 785) just outside of the community of Pelham. The Piedmont Triad Visitor Center is located on NC 700 just west of the interchange.

== History ==
Established in 1934 as a new primary routing from northwest of Eden to Pelham. In 1957, NC 700 was truncated to the new freeway alignment of US 29. In 2000, NC 700 was truncated at NC 14/NC 87/NC 770, when all state highways were removed from central Eden.

== Junction list ==
County	Location	mi	km	Destinations	Notes
Rockingham	Eden	0.0– 0.1	0.0– 0.16	US 311 south / NC 14 / NC 87 / NC 770 west (North Van Buren Road) / West Meadow Road / Jackson Street – Reidsville, Martinsville	Interchange; west end of NC 770 overlap
Rockingham	Eden	1.4	2.3	US 311 north / NC 770 east (East Meadow Road) / Summit Road – Danville	East end of NC 770 overlap
Caswell	Pelham	18.8– 19.0	30.3– 30.6	US 29 / Shady Grove Road – Reidsville, Danville	Interchange; future I-785
1.000 mi = 1.609 km; 1.000 km = 0.621 mi: Concurrency terminus
