= Arista Cotton Mill Complex =

Historic industrial complex in North Carolina, US

- U.S. National Register of Historic Places
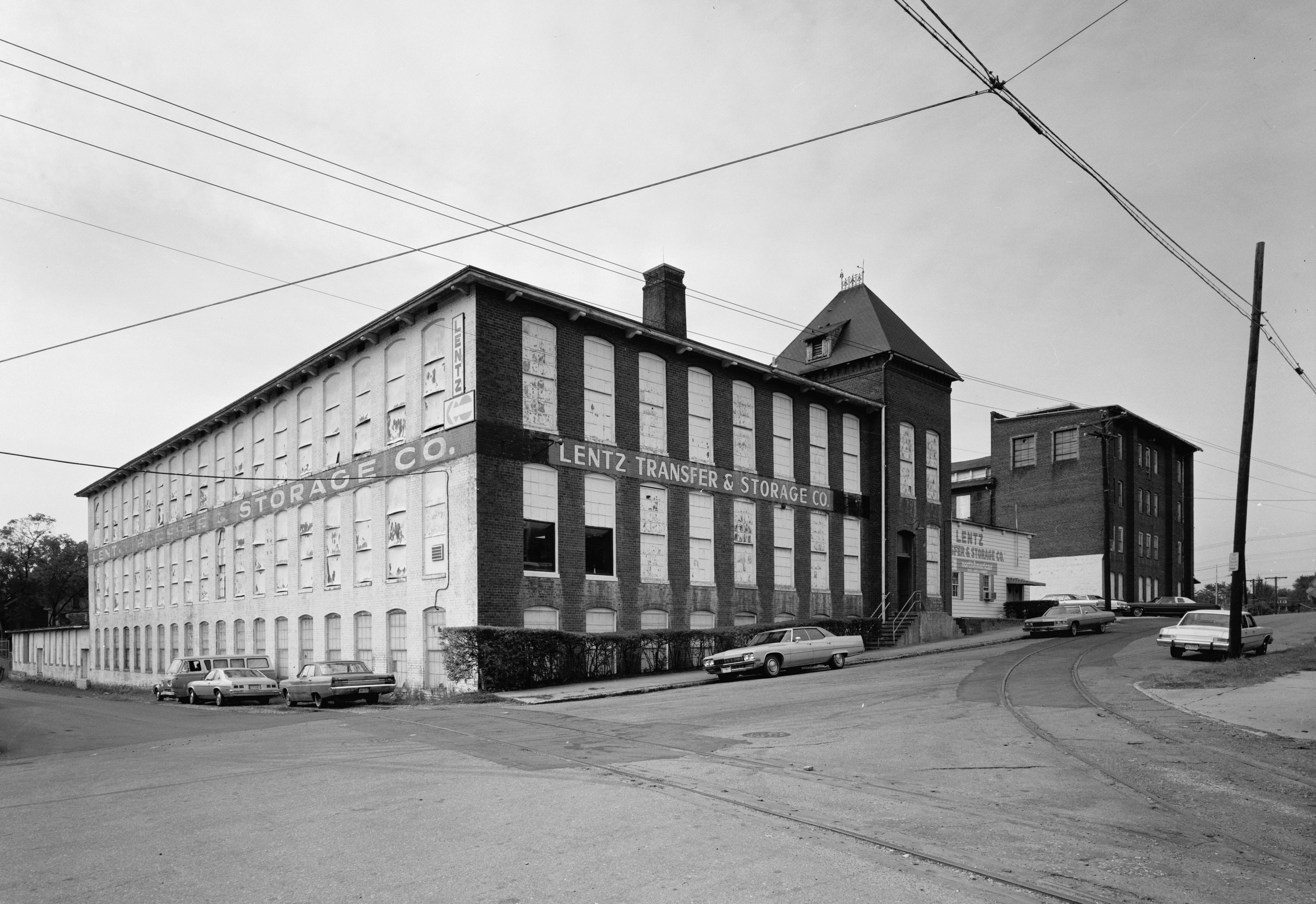
- Arista Cotton Mill, HAER Photo, September 1977

- Location within North Carolina Location within the United States
- Location: 200 Brookstown Ave., Winston-Salem, North Carolina
- Coordinates: 36°05′24″N 80°14′46″W
- Area: less than one acre
- Built: 1836, 1880, c. 1900
- NRHP reference No.: 77000999
- Added to NRHP: August 18, 1977

Arista Cotton Mill Complex, also known as Salem Cotton Manufacturing Company and Arista Cotton Mill (Fries Mill Complex) and Lentz Transfer & Storage Co., is a historic cotton mill complex located at Winston-Salem, Forsyth County, North Carolina. The complex includes two buildings: a brick building built in 1836 by part of the Moravian congregation of Salem and the original home of the Salem Cotton Manufacturing Company, and the other is the original Arista Mill, built in 1880 by F. and H. Fries Cotton Arista Mills. The 1836 Salem Cotton Mill is a three-story, brick building with a monitor roof. The 1880 mill is a three-story brick building, 14 bays long, with bracketed eaves with timber supports. A two-story roughly triangular brick building was added about 1900. The 1836 building has been converted to a hotel known as The Historic Brookstown Inn.

It was listed on the National Register of Historic Places in 1977.
