= Providence, Rockingham County, North Carolina =

Unincorporated community in North Carolina

Providence, North Carolina
- Unincorporated community
- Location within North Carolina Location within the United States
- Coordinates: 36°28′25″N 79°49′43″W
- Country: United States
- State: North Carolina
- County: Rockingham
- Elevation: 627 ft (191 m)
- Time zone: UTC-5 (Eastern (EST))
  - Summer (DST): UTC-4 (EDT)
- Area code: 336
- GNIS feature ID: 1953536

Providence is an unincorporated community in Rockingham County, North Carolina, United States. Providence is 3.5 miles (5.6 km) west-southwest of Eden.
