= Piedmont Land Conservancy =

Nonprofit organization

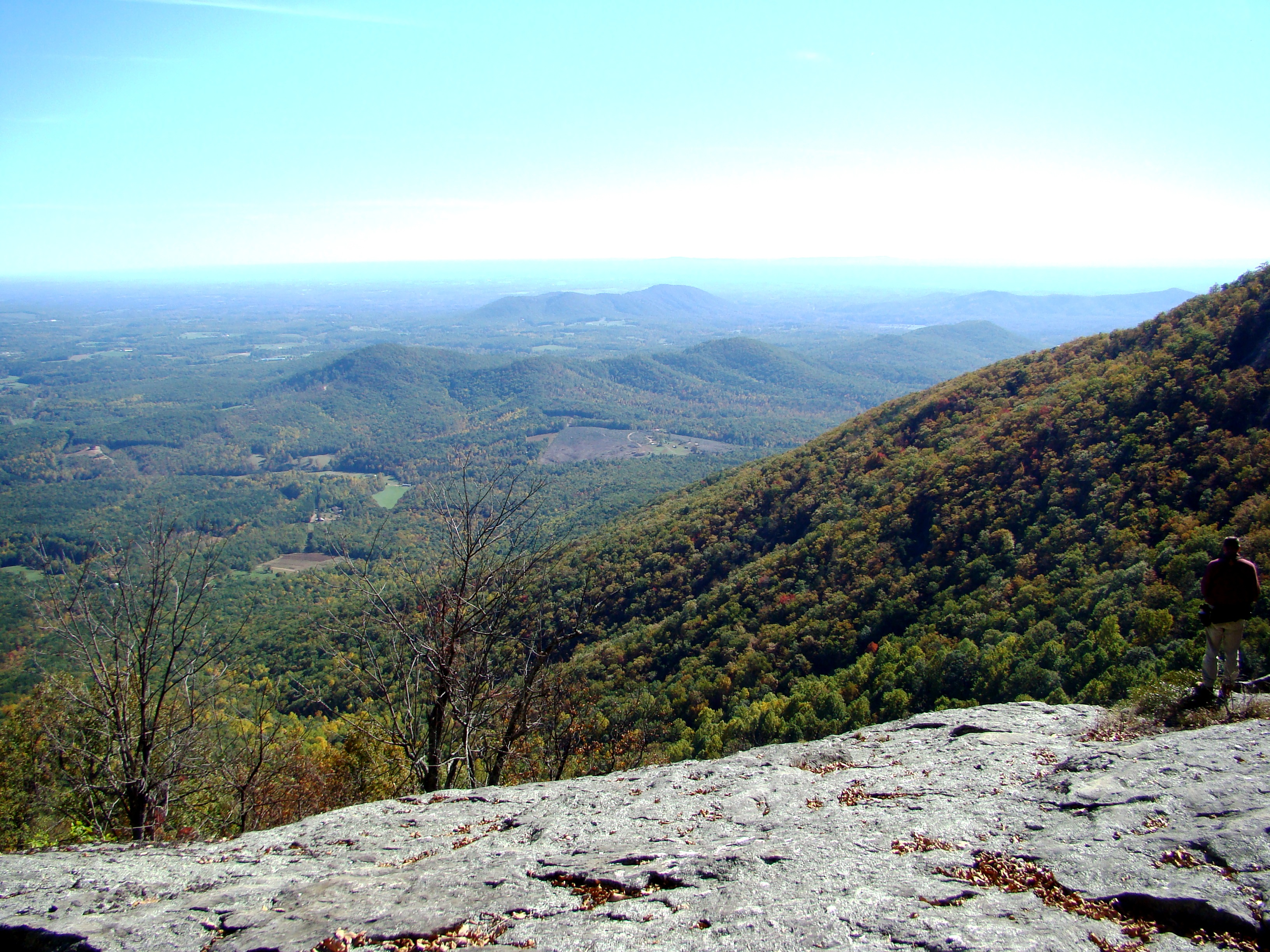
As of 2013, PLC owns 1700 acres of Fisher Peak in Surry County

Piedmont Land Conservancy (PLC) is a nonprofit conservation land trust and charitable organization operating in nine northern Piedmont North Carolina counties – Alamance, Caswell, Forsyth, Guilford, Randolph, Rockingham, Stokes, Surry and Yadkin. PLC’s land protection priorities are watersheds, farmland, urban green spaces and natural heritage sites as defined by the North Carolina Department of Environment and Natural Resources.

PLC is a member of the Land Trust Alliance It received national accreditation by the Land Trust Alliance in 2010. PLC is also a member of the North Carolina Land Trust Federation, an association of 20 nonprofit North Carolina Land Trusts.

Kathy Treanor and other citizens of Greensboro, North Carolina founded Piedmont Land Conservancy in 1990. Mrs. Treanor led PLC until 2002 when Palmer McIntyre became executive director. Charlie Brummitt followed Mrs. McIntyre as executive director in 2003. Kevin Redding became executive director in 2007.

The Conservancy’s first project protected 12 acres (0.049 km^{2}) of wetlands at Pinecroft Lake Park in southwest Greensboro. Its first major farmland project protected 107 acres (0.43 km^{2}) of Lindale Farm – land that is now surrounded by the city of High Point. PLC’s smallest projects protected a series of half-acre lots for addition to the Guilford Courthouse National Military Park. Its largest project protected 2,100 acres (8.5 km^{2}) of Mitchell River Watershed in Surry and Alleghany counties.

Like many land conservancies, PLC receives its funding from multiple sources. One notable source was mitigation for the 2014 Dan River coal ash spill.

In its first 25 years, PLC protected more than 22,000 acres.
