= Washington Mills-Mayodan Plant =

Historic district in North Carolina, United States

- U.S. National Register of Historic Places
- U.S. Historic district
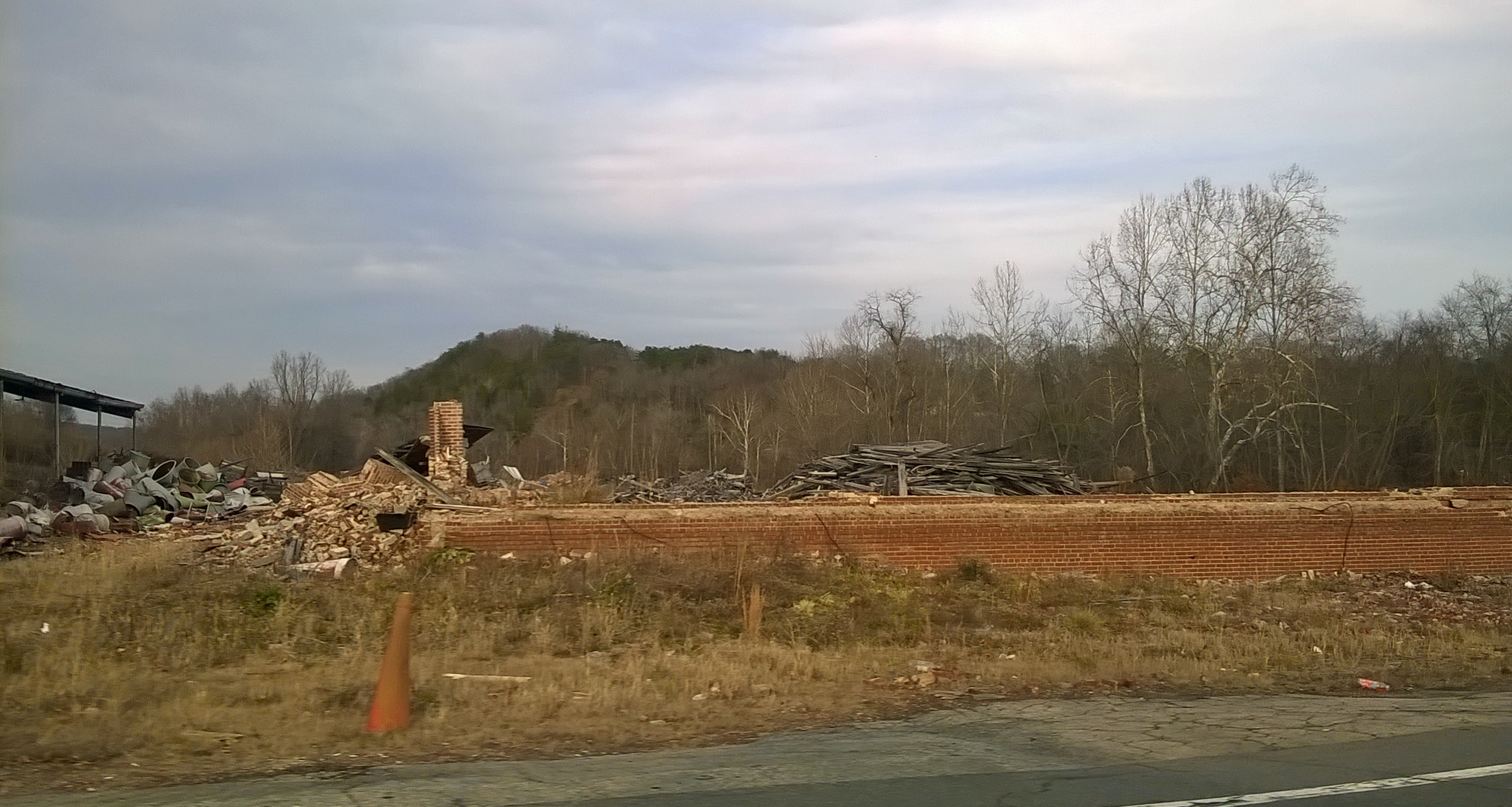
- Remains of the mill in 2016

- Location within North Carolina Location within the United States
- Location: 7801 NC 35, Mayodan, North Carolina
- Coordinates: 36°24′32″N 79°57′57″W
- Area: 10.8 acres (4.4 ha)
- Built: 1895
- Built by: Fogle Brothers
- Architectural style: Late 19th And Early 20th Century American Movements, Heavy Timber Mill
- NRHP reference No.: 05000319
- Added to NRHP: April 20, 2005

Washington Mills-Mayodan Plant, also known as Mayo Mills, Washington Group-Mayodan Plant, and Tultex Corp.-Mayodan Plant, was a historic textile mill and national historic district located at Mayodan, Rockingham County, North Carolina. It encompassed four contributing buildings and two contributing structures in the town of Mayodan. The main spinning mill was built in 1895, and was a three-story, rectangular brick structure with a low-pitched gable roof. The mill was expanded several times between 1897 and 1954. It featured a four-story, one bay, tower with an open belfry at the top. Also on the property were the contributing knitting mill (1911), transformer house (c. 1900), railroad underpass, railroad spur, and frame wood shed. The mill closed in 1999.

The mill buildings were demolished in 2012.

It was listed on the National Register of Historic Places in 2005.
