= Mayo River (Dan River tributary) =

Stream in North Carolina, USA

Mayo River Tributary to Dan River
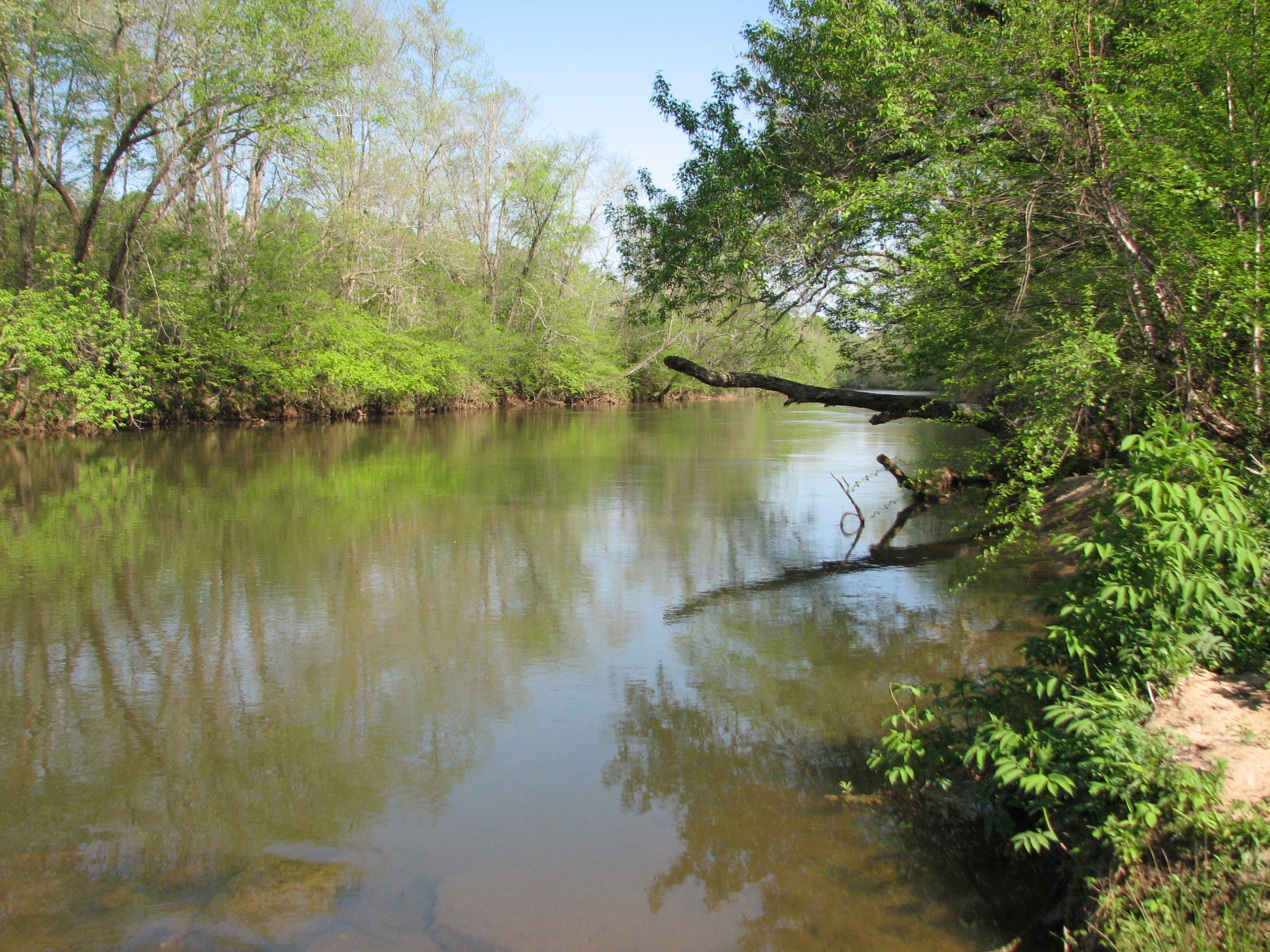
- Mayo River at US 220 access

- Location of Mayo River mouth Mayo River (Dan River tributary) (the United States)

Location
- Country: United States
- State: North Carolina
- County: Rockingham
- City: Mayodan

Physical characteristics
- Source: confluence of North and South Mayo Rivers
  - location: about 6 miles northeast of Ayersville, North Carolina
  - coordinates: 36°32′25″N 078°59′21″W
  - elevation: 698 ft (213 m)
- Mouth: Dan River
  - location: Madison, North Carolina
  - coordinates: 36°23′24″N 078°57′07″W
  - elevation: 538 ft (164 m)
- Length: 15.58 mi (25.07 km)
- Basin size: 317.50 square miles (822.3 km^{2})
- Discharge
  - location: Mayodan River
  - average: 416.64 cu ft/s (11.798 m^{3}/s) at mouth with Dan River

Basin features
- Progression: south-southeast
- River system: Dan River
- Tributaries
  - left: Buffalo Creek; Hickory Creek
  - right: Pawpaw Creek
- Bridges: Anglin Mill Road, T. Clarence Stone Highway, US 220, JJ Webster Highway, Dan Valley Road

The Mayo River is a tributary of the Dan River, which in turn is a tributary of the Roanoke River. All three rivers flow through the U.S. states of Virginia and North Carolina. It is named for Major William Mayo (ca. 1685-1744).

== Course ==
The Mayo River is formed by two main branches, the North Fork Mayo River and the South Fork Mayo River. Both forks rise in Patrick County, Virginia, gathering the waters of many tributary streams. The two forks join in northwestern Rockingham County, North Carolina, forming the Mayo River proper, which then flows south into joining the Dan River near the towns of Mayodan, North Carolina and Madison, North Carolina.

== See also ==
- Mayo River State Park
- List of Virginia rivers
- List of North Carolina rivers
