= Mayodan, North Carolina =

- Town
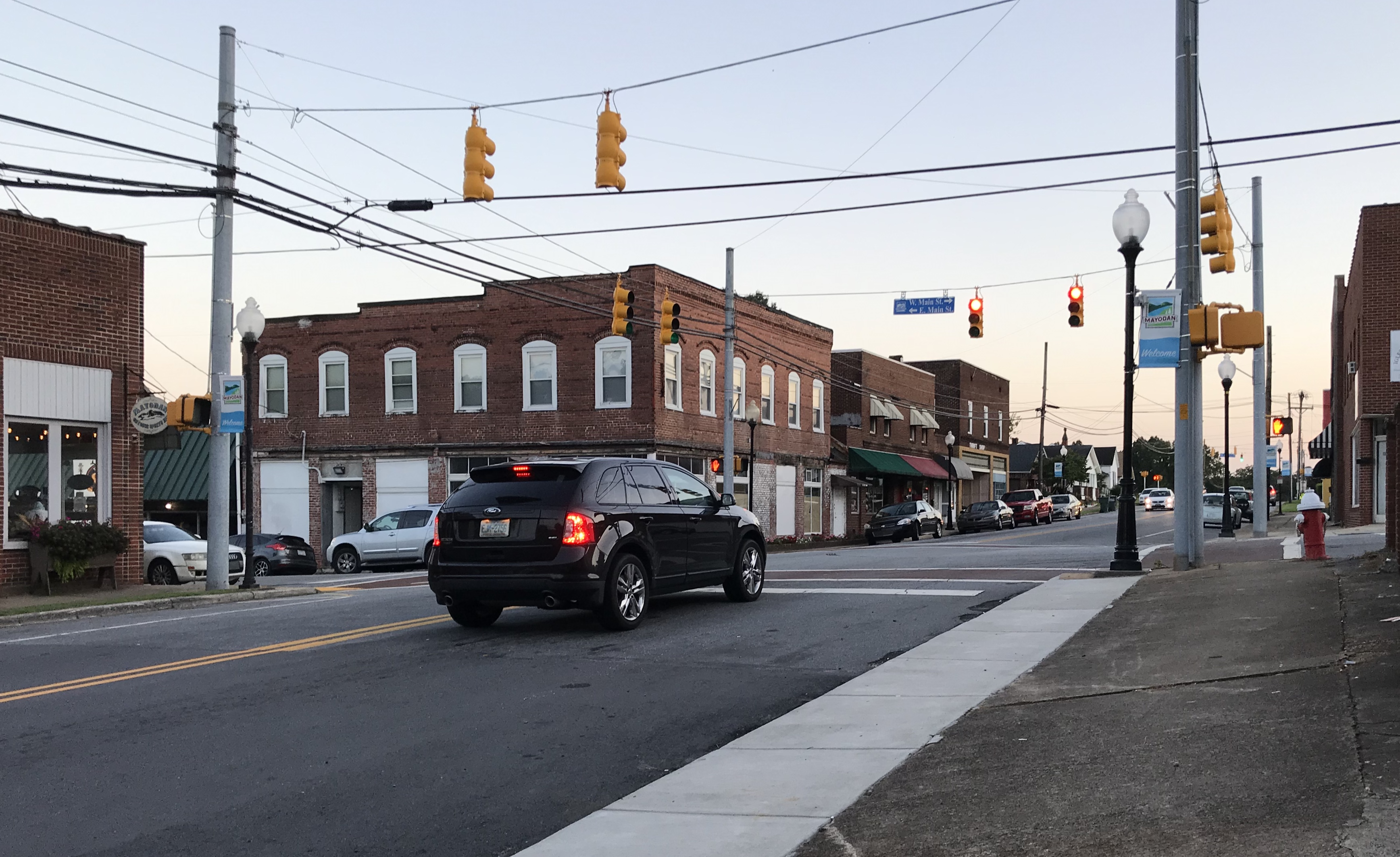

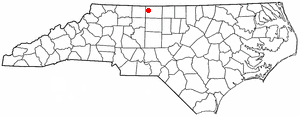
- Location of Mayodan, North Carolina
- Coordinates: 36°25′16″N 79°58′03″W
- Country: United States
- State: North Carolina
- County: Rockingham
- Named for: The confluence of the Dan and Mayo rivers

Government
  - Mayor: Chad Wall
  - Town Manager: Kathleen Patterson

Area
  - Total: 2.90 sq mi (7.51 km^{2})
  - Land: 2.88 sq mi (7.45 km^{2})
  - Water: 0.019 sq mi (0.05 km^{2})
- Elevation: 656 ft (200 m)

Population (2020)
  - Total: 2,418
  - Density: 840.5/sq mi (324.53/km^{2})
- Time zone: UTC-5 (Eastern (EST))
  - Summer (DST): UTC-4 (EDT)
- ZIP code: 27027
- Area code: 336
- FIPS code: 37-42060
- GNIS feature ID: 2406116
- Website: www.townofmayodan.com
- Mayodan Historic District
- U.S. National Register of Historic Places
- U.S. Historic district
- NRHP reference No.: 16000222
- Designated HD: August 15, 2016

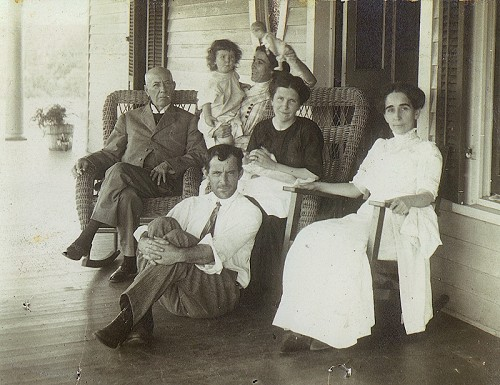
The Pannill family on the porch of their home, Mayodan, 1911

Mayodan is a town in Rockingham County, North Carolina, in the United States. As of the 2020 census, Mayodan had a population of 2,418. It is a manufacturing site for Sturm, Ruger & Co., Bridgestone Aircraft Tire, and formerly General Tobacco until its closure in 2010. Washington Mills Company, later Tultex, operated a textile mill in Mayodan until 1999.

The town is named for two rivers that converge nearby, the Mayo and the Dan, and, according to Ripley's Believe It or Not!, is the only town in the world with this name.

== History ==
Mayodan started as a mill town when a cotton mill was built in 1892. Operations began in April 1896. In 1998 a Tornado struck the town, damaging Mayodan Methodist Church causing it to be rebuilt. The Washington Mills-Mayodan Plant was listed on the National Register of Historic Places in 2005. The Mayodan Historic District has been on the National Register since 2016.

== Geography ==
According to the United States Census Bureau, the town has a total area of 1.5 square miles (3.9 km^{2}); 1.5 square miles (3.9 km^{2}) of the area is land and 0.66% is water.

Mayodan is located near the confluence of the Mayo and Dan Rivers.

== Schools ==
- High Schools: Dalton L. McMichael High School
- Middle Schools: Western Rockingham Middle School
- Elementary Schools: John W Dillard Academy (In Madison, NC)

== Demographics ==
Historical population
Census	Pop.	Note	%±
1900	904		—
1910	874		−3.3%
1920	1,886		115.8%
1930	1,948		3.3%
1940	2,323		19.3%
1950	2,246		−3.3%
1960	2,366		5.3%
1970	2,875		21.5%
1980	2,627		−8.6%
1990	2,471		−5.9%
2000	2,417		−2.2%
2010	2,478		2.5%
2020	2,418		−2.4%
2021 (est.)	2,415	▼	−0.1%
U.S. Decennial Census

=== 2020 census ===
Mayodan racial composition
Race	Number	Percentage
White (non-Hispanic)	1,887	78.04%
Black or African American (non-Hispanic)	284	11.75%
Native American	3	0.12%
Asian	10	0.41%
Other/Mixed	105	4.34%
Hispanic or Latino	129	5.33%

As of the 2020 census, Mayodan had a population of 2,418. The median age was 49.6 years. 15.6% of residents were under the age of 18 and 26.4% of residents were 65 years of age or older. For every 100 females there were 84.3 males, and for every 100 females age 18 and over there were 80.1 males age 18 and over.

96.1% of residents lived in urban areas, while 3.9% lived in rural areas.

There were 1,180 households in Mayodan, including 671 family households. Of all households, 22.5% had children under the age of 18 living in them, 30.3% were married-couple households, 23.7% were households with a male householder and no spouse or partner present, and 41.8% were households with a female householder and no spouse or partner present. About 43.8% of all households were made up of individuals, and 23.0% had someone living alone who was 65 years of age or older.

There were 1,330 housing units, of which 11.3% were vacant. The homeowner vacancy rate was 2.8% and the rental vacancy rate was 6.3%.

=== 2010 census ===
As of the census of 2010, there were 2,478 people, 1,173 households, and 651 families residing in the town. The population density was 1,608.8 inhabitants per square mile (621.2/km^{2}). There were 1,268 housing units at an average density of 844.0 per square mile (325.9/km^{2}). The racial makeup of the town was 85.85% White, 10.38% African American, 0.17% Native American, 0.21% Asian, 2.57% from other races, and 0.83% from two or more races. Hispanic or Latino of any race were 4.01% of the population.

There were 1,173 households, out of which 21.4% had children under the age of 18 living with them; 38.6% were married couples living together; 13.3% had a female householder with no husband present; and 44.5% were non-families. 41.4% of all households were made up of individuals, and 21.2% had someone living alone who was 65 years of age or older. The average household size was 2.06 and the average family size was 2.78 people.

The population's age distribution was broad: 19.3% under the age of 18, 7.4% from 18 to 24, 27.5% from 25 to 44, 23.4% from 45 to 64, and 22.4% who were 65 years of age or older. The median age was 43 years. For every 100 females, there were 82.3 males. For every 100 females age 18 and over, there were 79.7 males.

The median income for a household in Mayodan was $25,980, and the median income for a family was $36,328. Males had a median income of $25,878 versus $21,250 for females. The per capita income for the town was $15,607. 16.0% of the population and 11.3% of families were below the poverty line. 20.5% of those under the age of 18 and 17.9% of those 65 and older were living below the poverty line.

== Notable residents ==
- Benny Carter (1943–2014) - painter
