= Benny Carter (painter) =

American artist (1943–2014)

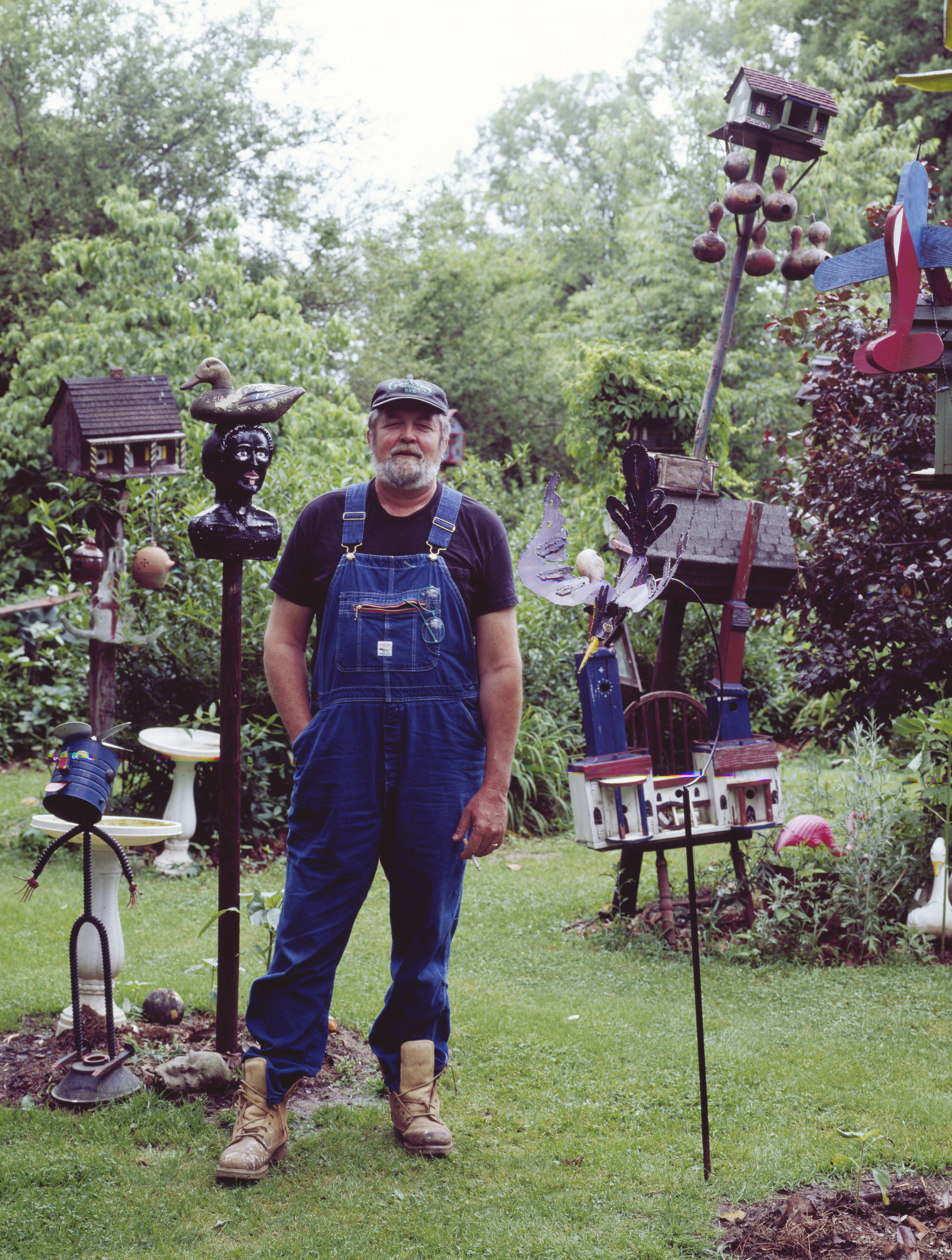
- Photo of Carter taken by Carol M. Highsmith at his home studio in Rockingham County, North Carolina
- Born: Binford Taylor Carter, Jr. November 29, 1943; High Point, North Carolina, U.S.
- Died: 2 February 2014 (aged 70); Mayodan, North Carolina, U.S.
- Resting place: Sardis Primitive Baptist Church Cemetery; Madison, North Carolina
- Education: Madison-Mayodan High School
- Occupation: Artist
- Spouse: Teressa Lynn Craddock
- Parent(s): Binford Taylor Carter, Sr. (father); Mary Sue Young (mother)

Binford Taylor Carter, Jr., known as Benny Carter or Bennie Carter, (November 29, 1943 – February 2, 2014) was an American contemporary visual artist. His primary focus was as a painter and sculptor within the genres of folk art and outsider art.

== Early life and family ==
Binford Taylor Carter, Jr. was born in High Point, North Carolina, on November 29, 1943, to Binford Taylor Carter, Sr. and Mary Sue Young. He grew up in Madison with his sister, Rebecca. His paternal grandparents, Yancey Ligon Carter and Mary Elizabeth Morton, were prominent tobacco farmers in Rockingham County. Carter is a descendant of the colonist Thomas Carter, a Puritan minister of the Massachusetts Bay Colony. A branch of the Carter family later moved to the south and became planters, owning the Carter Plantation near Wentworth in Rockingham County. Carter was a first cousin of photographer Carol M. Highsmith and journalist Linda Carter Brinson, and a nephew of Lieutenant-Colonel James Pratt Carter. He was raised in the Baptist faith. He graduated from Madison-Mayodan High School in 1962. After finishing school, Carter worked as a supervisor at Halstead Metal Products in Pine Hall.

The Carter Family Homeplace, on the family's plantation in Wentworth, where Carter's grandfather was born.

== Career ==
Carter, who was suffering from depression, began painting in 1991 after he lost his job at Halstead Metal Products due to a layoff. A self-trained artist, he painted mainly in the contemporary style and has been classified as a folk and outsider artist. The subjects of his work included waterfront landscapes, Biblical stories, and farm landscapes. Carter also designed birdhouses, clocks, totems, and metal sculptures. His later work featured paintings of New York City imagery including skylines, taxi cabs, and the Statue of Liberty. He created a collection of work depicting New York City after the September 11 attacks, featuring scenes of the attack and memorials to the victims. Carter's work was influenced by his Baptist upbringing, including a painting that depicted Elvis Presley and Dolly Parton as Adam and Eve, and a series of portraits depicting Jesus as African-American. He also painted a series of portraits depicting the Statue of Liberty as an African-American woman.

Carter's work has been displayed in the American Visionary Art Museum, the Virginia Museum of Natural History, the Palmer Museum of Art, the University of Michigan Museum of Art, and the Montgomery Museum of Fine Arts. His work was documented in the books Self-Taught, Outsider, and Folk Art by Betty-Carol Sellen and Cynthia J. Johanson, American Folk Art: A Regional Reference by Kristin G. Congdon and Kara Kelley Hallmark, and Light of the Spirit: Portraits of Southern Outsider Artists by Karekin Goekjian and Robert Peacock.

== Later life and death ==
Carter was married to Teressa Lynn Craddock and lived in Mayodan, North Carolina. He attended Good News Baptist Church in Madison.

He died on February 2, 2014, at his home in Mayodan. A funeral service was held at Sardis Primitive Baptist Church in Madison on February 22, 2014. He was buried in the Sardis Church Cemetery.

On May 9, 2014, his estate was auctioned off.
