= Carter Plantation (Wentworth, North Carolina) =

Plantation in Wentworth, North Carolina, US

- Picture of the Thomas B. Carter House on the Carter Plantation
- Alternative names: Thomas Bracken Carter House

General information
- Status: Demolished
- Type: plantation house
- Architectural style: Federal
- Location: Wentworth, North Carolina, U.S.
- Coordinates: 36.344417°N 79.821111°W
- Demolished: post-1930
- Owner: Carter Family

The Carter Plantation was a tobacco plantation in Wentworth, North Carolina. The plantation was founded by Thomas Carter III, a descendant of American colonist and Puritan minister Rev. Thomas Carter, who received a land grant for three-hundred acres in Rockingham County when he settled in North Carolina after leaving Massachusetts in the late 18th century. The original house, a large Federal style dwelling, was vacated in 1930 and was destroyed shortly after. What remains of the plantation, including two log houses, a tenant farmer's cabin, and a cemetery for family members and enslaved persons, is located off of North Carolina Highway 65.

== History ==
Pleasant Jiles Carter Homeplace on the plantation

The Carter family of Wentworth descends from the colonist Rev. Thomas Carter, who served as a Puritan minister in the Massachusetts Bay Colony, through his son, Rev. Samuel Carter. Thomas Carter's great-great grandson, Thomas Carter III (1745-1817), moved to North Carolina from Massachusetts around 1782 and received a land grant for 300 acres on both sides of Little Rockhouse Creek in Rockingham County, east of the Dan River, from the State of North Carolina. At the time of his death, the plantation was 459 acres. The Carter plantation was adjacent to the lands of James Robert, John Walker, the Tate family, and the Hunter family. The land was divided among his children. One daughter, Phebe Carter, sold her share of the estate to her brother, Isaac Carter. Isaac sold his share of the estate in 1820. Another brother, Daniel Carter, died in 1815, two years before his father, and his share of the estate went to his children.

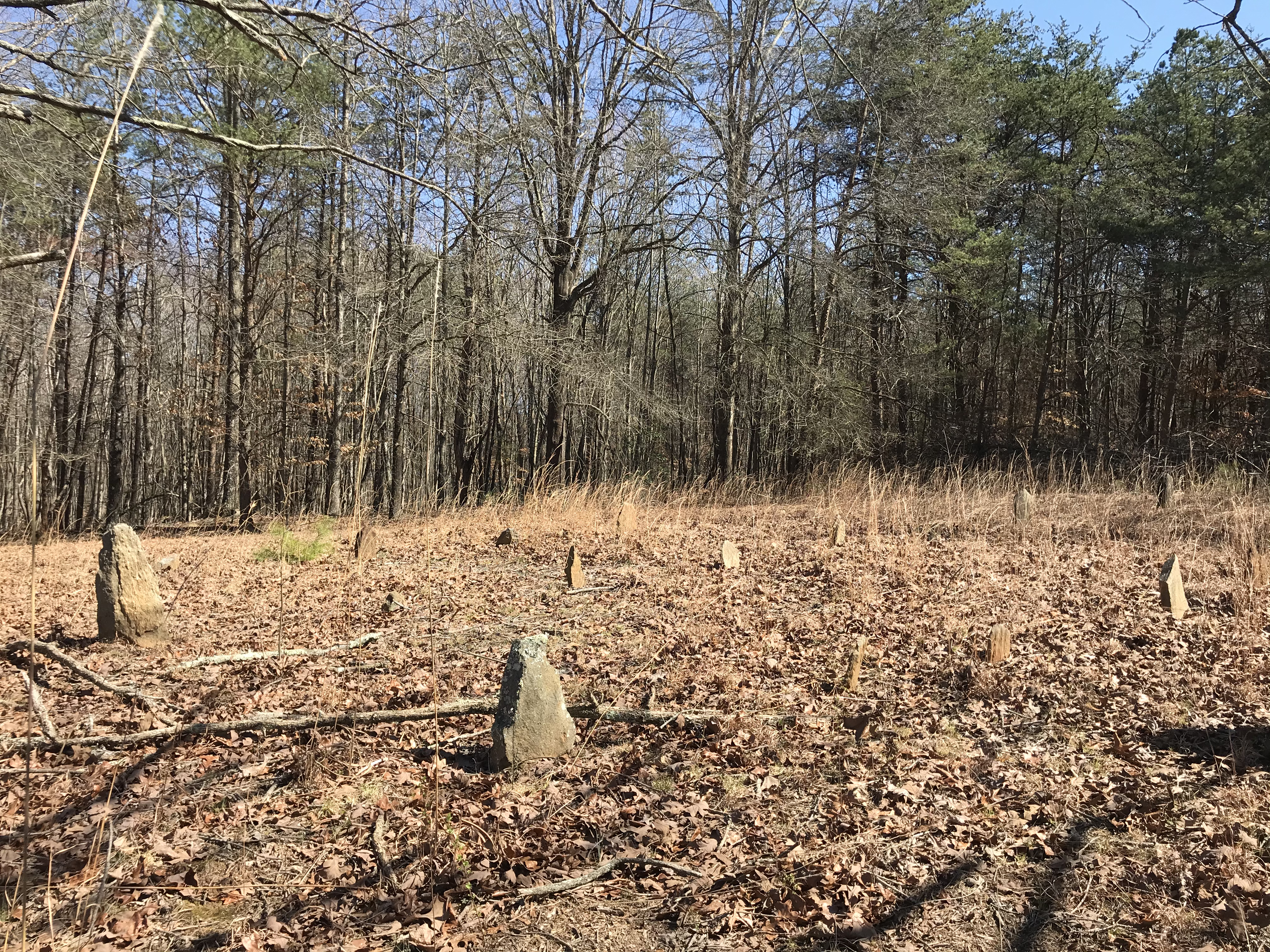
Graves of people enslaved on the plantation

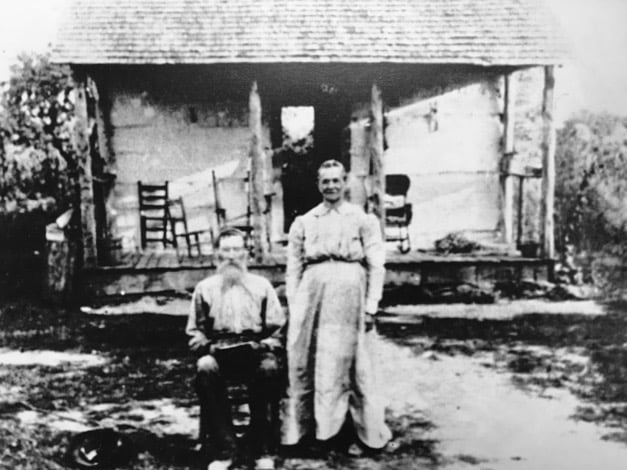
Pleasant Jiles Carter and Sarah Catherine Sharp Carter outside of one of the log houses

Thomas Carter III's grandson, Thomas Bracken Carter (1800-1865), later inherited the plantation. He was the son of Daniel Carter. Carter and his wife, Sarah Holman Carter (died 1892), enslaved over sixty African-American people on the plantation, growing tobacco as the main source of income. His wife was the daughter of Yancey Holman, a Revolutionary War veteran from Virginia. Thomas and Sarah had ten children who were born on the plantation. Thomas and Sarah are buried in the family cemetery, connected to a cemetery for those enslaved on the plantation, located on the plantation. The plantation was divided among their children. The original plantation house, which included a large library, burnt down in the mid-twentieth century. One son, Pleasant Jiles Carter (1847-1931) inherited some of the plantation land and a log cabin, consisting of one large downstairs room with a stone fireplace, and one upstairs room. He built a larger log house across from the cabin and converted the smaller house into a kitchen. He was married to Sarah Catherine Sharp (b 1855), daughter of George Valentine Sharp and Jane Tickle Sharp, and had ten children. Some of their children, including a son named Yancey Ligon Carter, were born in this house. Yancey, who became a justice of the peace and a trial lawyer, rented one of the houses with his wife, Mary Elizabeth Morton Carter, until they left and bought a farm in Madison, North Carolina. Yancey Ligon Carter and his descendants were buried at Sardis Primitive Baptist Church, instead of the plantation cemetery.

The two log cabins and cemetery, located off of North Carolina Highway 65 in Wentworth, were later sold by the family. In 2021, the log cabins and cemetery were bought back by members of the family. A photography exhibit on the houses, and on the Carter family, taken by Carter descendant and photographer Carol M. Highsmith, is part of the collection of the Museum and Archives of Rockingham County.

Notable descendants of Yancey Ligon Carter include Lieutenant-Colonel J. P. Carter, Linda Carter Brinson, Carol M. Highsmith, and Benny Carter.
