= Rockingham County Courthouse =

Rockingham County Courthouse may refer to:

- Rockingham County Courthouse (North Carolina)
- Rockingham County Courthouse (Virginia)
