= Wentworth Methodist Episcopal Church and Cemetery =

Historic site in Rockingham County, North Carolina, US

- Wentworth Methodist Episcopal Church, South and Cemetery
- U.S. National Register of Historic Places
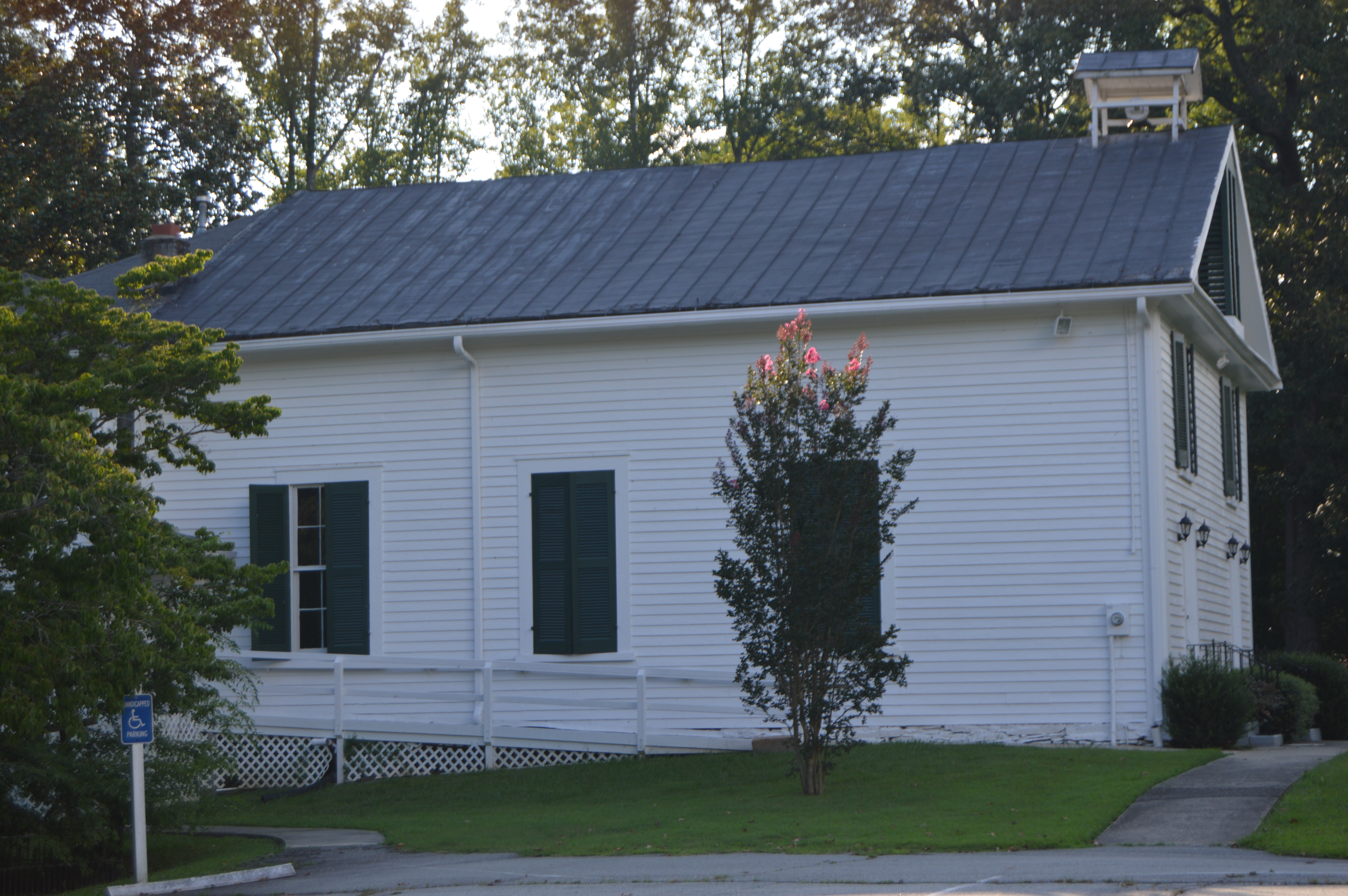
- Eastern side

- Location within North Carolina Location within the United States
- Location: North Carolina Highway 65 west of SR 2124, at Wentworth, North Carolina
- Coordinates: 36°24′3″N 79°46′40″W
- Area: 2.9 acres (1.2 ha)
- Built: 1859
- NRHP reference No.: 86000391
- Added to NRHP: March 13, 1986

Wentworth Methodist Episcopal Church, South and Cemetery, also known as Wentworth United Methodist Church, is a historic Methodist church located at Wentworth, Rockingham County, North Carolina.

The Wentworth Church was organized on October 1, 1836. The first church building was located on Main Street just west of the Rockingham County Courthouse. The present 1859 sanctuary, built on the western outskirts of the original historic village area, is the last surviving pre-Civil War Methodist edifice in Rockingham County. The sanctuary (an antebellum meetinghouse once common in American Methodism) has been restored and contains one of the two remaining slave galleries in a Rockingham County church (The second slave gallery is in the nearby Wentworth Presbyterian Church which was organized in 1859 and constructed its present sanctuary in 1860).

In the church cemetery lie buried many prominent local residents, Confederate dead, and former slaves. Also buried there is the Rev. Dr. Numa F. Reid (1825–1873) one of the noted leaders of Southern Methodism in antebellum and postwar North Carolina. Reid's son, James Wesley Reid (1849–1902), a U.S. Congressman from 1884 to 1886, was an active member of this congregation. State senator John W. Stephens was a parishioner of the church. Robert Martin, Jr. the father-in-law of U.S. Senator Stephen A. Douglas of Illinois was an early trustee of this church.

It was added to the National Register of Historic Places in 1986 and a restoration of the antebellum sanctuary was begun in 1981.

The church is located at 1308 NC 65 (Main Street) in Wentworth and on the western end of the original village area. The congregation, though small, is active with weekly Sunday worship services. It is part of the Western North Carolina Conference of the United Methodist Church.
