= Carol M. Highsmith =

American photographer (born 1946)

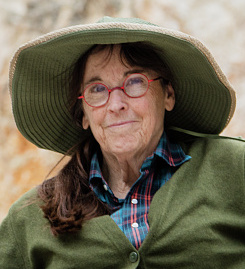
- Highsmith in 2015
- Born: Carol Louise McKinney; May 18, 1946 (age 80); Leaksville, North Carolina, U.S.
- Education: Minnehaha Academy; Corcoran School of Art; American University
- Known for: Photography Collection of American Images at the Library of Congress
- Spouse(s): Mark Highsmith; Ted Landphair
- Relatives: Benny Carter (cousin); Linda Carter Brinson (cousin); James Pratt Carter (uncle) Mike McKinney (great-grandfather)
- Patrons: George F. Landegger; The Capital Group Foundation in memory of its late chairman, Jon B. Lovelace; Lyda Hill of Dallas, Texas; The Gates Frontiers Fund; The Ben May Family Foundation; Craig and Barbara Barrett; Pew Charitable Trust; The Library of Congress
- Website: www.carolhighsmithamerica.com

Carol McKinney Highsmith (born Carol Louise McKinney on May 18, 1946) is an American photographer and author. Her work documents the landscapes, architecture, and people of the rural and urban United States in a decades-long nationwide study, in progress since the 1980s. Highsmith has donated her photographs to the Library of Congress since 1992, creating a collection of nearly 100,000 images, all in the public domain.

Highsmith began her nationwide photography project after extensively photographing the Willard Hotel in the early 1980s for its restoration, a project that introduced her to the works of pioneering 20th-century photojournalist Frances Benjamin Johnston. Highsmith cites Johnston as a major influence, drawing on Johnston's comprehensive architectural and landscape photography of the 1920s and 1930s and on the donation of her life's work to the Library of Congress. Since 2010, Highsmith has toured multiple states per year to create a broad pictorial record of the country in the 21st century, a series that she expects to complete in 2026.

== Early life and studies ==
=== Childhood ===
External videos
- Renowned Photographer Captures America’s National Treasures

Carol Louise McKinney was born to Luther Carlton McKinney II and Ruth Ragsdale Carter in Leaksville, North Carolina, near the large tobacco farm owned by her maternal grandparents, Yancey Ligon Carter and Mary Elizabeth Morton. Her mother's family were planters descending from the Puritan colonist Thomas Carter and owned a plantation near Wentworth, North Carolina. Highsmith's father was a manufacturer's representative, and her mother worked as the editor of Decision magazine, then the world's largest-distribution magazine, at the Minneapolis headquarters of evangelist Billy Graham. She is a first cousin of the journalist Linda Carter Brinson and the late folk artist Benny Carter, as well as a niece of lieutenant colonel J. P. Carter and 15 of his siblings.

In an hour-long interview with C-SPAN founder and host Brian Lamb on July 17, 2011, Highsmith spoke extensively of her childhood in Minneapolis and her summers in the South with her North Carolina "granny" and Atlanta, Georgia "grandmother," who went by that title alone. Carol and her sister Sara spent the first half of each summer on granny's Carolina tobacco farm and the second half as part of the high society with her grandmother in Atlanta. Highsmith said that the latter, Sara Maude Janes McKinney, was a friend of Gone With the Wind author Margaret Mitchell and other society women. "We'd spend every day at someone's pool or country club," Highsmith said. "Opera played on the radio. Grandmother taught us manners and etiquette—to sit up straight, eat with our mouths closed, and hold the soup spoon just so."

According to Highsmith, her rural granny was wealthier than her refined grandmother in Atlanta. "Granny and Granddad's large tobacco spread involved a lot of backbreaking work but was highly successful. Grandmother and grandfather [in Atlanta], had lost everything [including his furniture business] in two fires and the Great Depression. But grandmother's friends made like nothing had happened. They'd have her to dinner, play bridge and canasta, even take her on cruises to Europe and have their chauffeurs drive her as if she were still part of the aristocracy."

Highsmith told C-SPAN that the influence of her father, a traveling salesman of everything from wave pools to motor buses, and her own, mostly backroad travels through several states to reach her grandmothers imbued her with a fascination about America, "especially roadside America. The old car in which my mother would drive (my sister) Sara and me south would break down every year, it seemed, in little towns. We'd have to stay overnight in dingy tourist courts or rented rooms above the kinds of old service stations I love to photograph today."

Highsmith has cited her childhood experiences in rural Rockingham County as an enduring memory and influence.

In 1964, Carol Highsmith (then McKinney) graduated from Minnehaha Academy in Minneapolis.

== College, first marriage, and career ==
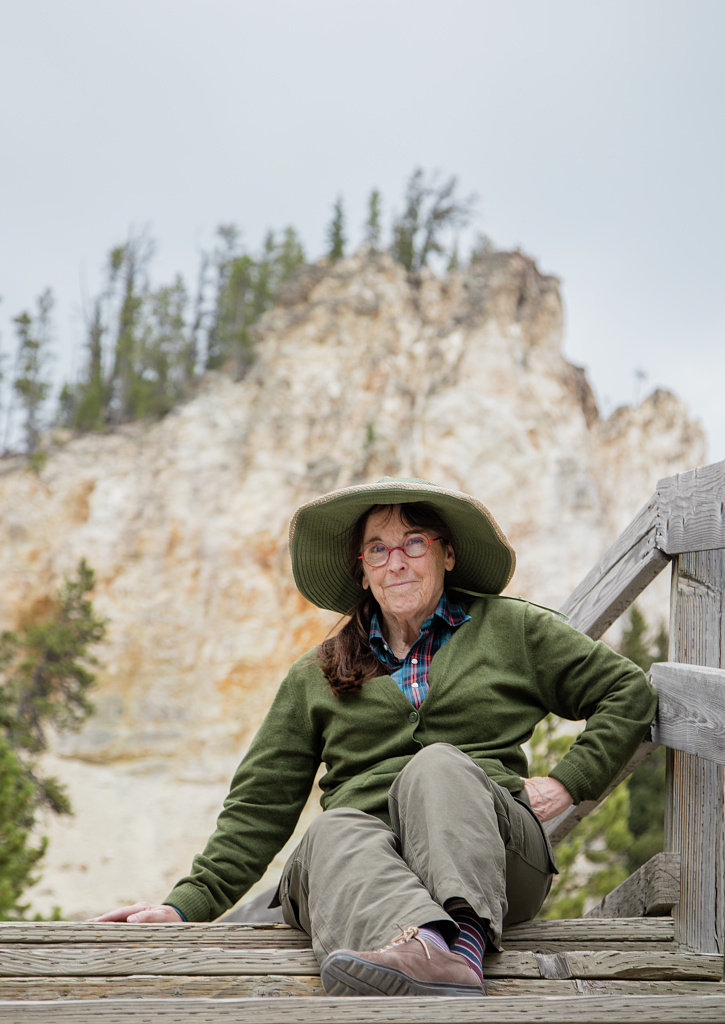
Highsmith replicating a pose at Yellowstone National Park by Frances Benjamin Johnston, who inspired her career

Following her years at the academy, Highsmith studied, or as she puts it, "just as often partied," for a year at the now-defunct Parsons College in Fairfield, Iowa.

At Parsons, Carol McKinney met Mark Highsmith, an artist from Queens, New York, who soon graduated and enlisted in the Army. The couple married in Minneapolis, then moved to Columbus, Georgia, where Mark Highsmith was stationed at Fort Benning. Upon his deployment to Vietnam in 1966, Carol Highsmith moved to Queens, New York, after securing a position at Peters Griffin Woodward, a national radio "rep" firm in Manhattan. As an assistant traffic manager at its Park Avenue offices, she logged advertisements for radio stations across the country. It was Highsmith's introduction to her first career in the broadcasting business.

=== First marriage and career ===
When Mark Highsmith returned from Vietnam in 1967, he was assigned to Fort Bragg, and the couple briefly moved to Fayetteville, North Carolina. Shortly thereafter, Mark Highsmith was discharged from the Army, and the Highsmiths relocated to Philadelphia, where Mark enrolled in the Pennsylvania Academy of Fine Arts and rented art-studio space downtown. Carol worked at WPHL-TV, the home of "Summertime at the Pier," a teenage dance show hosted by Philadelphia disc jockey Ed Hurst on Atlantic City's Steel Pier in nearby New Jersey.

Highsmith wrote promotional copy and produced shows. One of her jobs was to assist Bill "Wee Willie" Webber on his children's show, the Wee Willie Webber Colorful Cartoon Club. Highsmith was pictured in a Philadelphia Inquirer advertisement for the station, strumming a guitar. "Take Over a TV Station (for 50 seconds)," the ad copy read. "TV 17 doesn't care who you are. How old you are. Or how you think. As long as you or your group can write and sing music.... So if you really care, stop griping. And start writing."

The year 1969 brought a shattering, life-changing event. As Carol was driving to Philadelphia from Atlantic City, the radio station to which she was listening broadcast a devastating news item, that Mark Highsmith, a young, aspiring artist, had committed suicide by gun in his studio. "They actually broadcast such things, with names and all, back then," Carol says. "I pulled over and sobbed and sobbed and somehow made it home to a horrible scene."

Mark had returned from Vietnam with post traumatic stress disorder. Though horrified and faced with an uncertain future at best, Carol resolved to get a college degree and, in her words, "make something of myself." She moved to KYW-TV and began work in broadcast sales. All the while, Westinghouse Broadcasting, KYW's corporate owner, gave Highsmith a foothold in college by paying for her college coursework at the University of Pennsylvania, on nights and weekends.

== Early career in broadcasting ==
In 1976, Highsmith moved to Washington, D.C., and spent six years as a senior account executive for another market leader, radio station WMAL while taking classes at American University, also paid for by her employer, ABC. She served on boards of directors, including that of the Greater Washington Board of Trade.

In the 1970s, Highsmith broadcast from London and from Oktoberfest in Munich, conducting interviews with Germans.

== Early career as photographer and work at the Willard Hotel ==
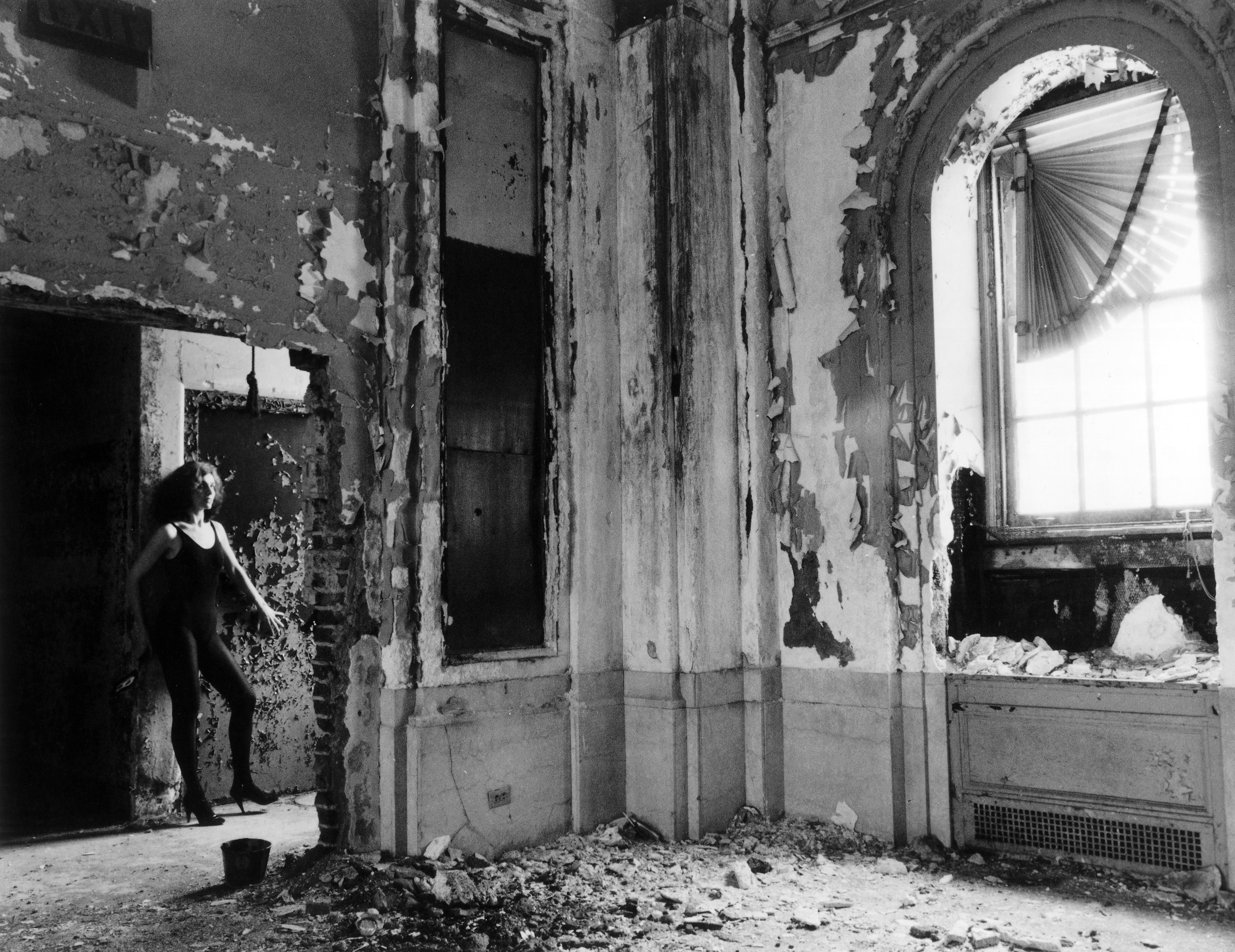
Carol M. Highsmith photograph of model in Willard Hotel

Highsmith worked in sales for the radio station, and in the 1970s, earned a station-paid trip to the Soviet Union, then a closed society. A client gave her a Pentax K1000 camera, the only one she owned. She later extended her trip to the People's Republic of China, where she visited rural villages. The trip fostered Highsmith's interest in documenting places visually.

After returning to the U.S., she took night-school photography classes at the Corcoran School. She was taught at the Corcoran under Frank DiPerna, who assigned each class member to photograph a model in an unusual location in metropolitan Washington. Highsmith chose the crumbling Willard Hotel, once the lavish "Hotel of Presidents" that had been closed since 1968. She viewed a collection of 50,000 photographs of the Willard taken by Frances Benjamin Johnston in 1901, during the hotel's glory days. The work of Johnson, a pioneering American woman in photography, was held by the Library of Congress's Prints and Photographs Division. Johnston's photos of the Beaux-Arts Willard in 1901, when it expanded from 100 to 389 rooms, were the sole source available to artisans during the Willard's grand restoration eight decades later, because no blueprints or artists' drawings had survived.

Highsmith's mostly black-and-white photos of the Willard reaffirmed her eye for detail and solidified her interest in photography, especially of decaying buildings. Highsmith's experience photographing the Willard inspired her to follow Johnson to document life across the United States, including to preserve a historic record. After the Willard was restored as a grand hotel and reopened in 1986, it displayed an extensive exhibit of Highsmith and Johnston's work in an alcove off the "Peacock Alley" corridor. In 2006, the American Institute of Architects held four-month comparative exhibit of Highsmith and Johnston's work called "Two Windows on the Willard"; like another AIA one-person exhibit of Highsmith's work, titled "Structures of our Times: 31 Buildings That Changed Modern Life" in 2002, the "Two Windows" study traveled to several locations across the country.

== Photography career, 1980s to present ==
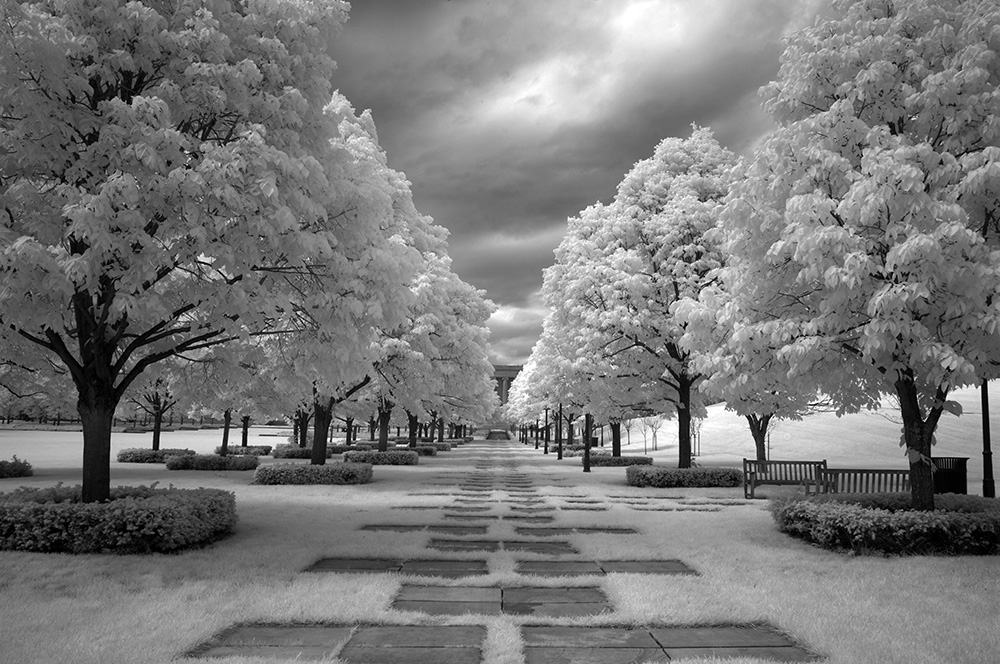
Nelson Atkins Museum in Kansas City

Around 1982, Highsmith quit her job at WMAL radio to pursue her dream of becoming a professional photographer. By 1987, she employed seven assistants at her studio at 13th and G streets NW in Washington, D.C., charging as much as $1,500 for a day of photography.

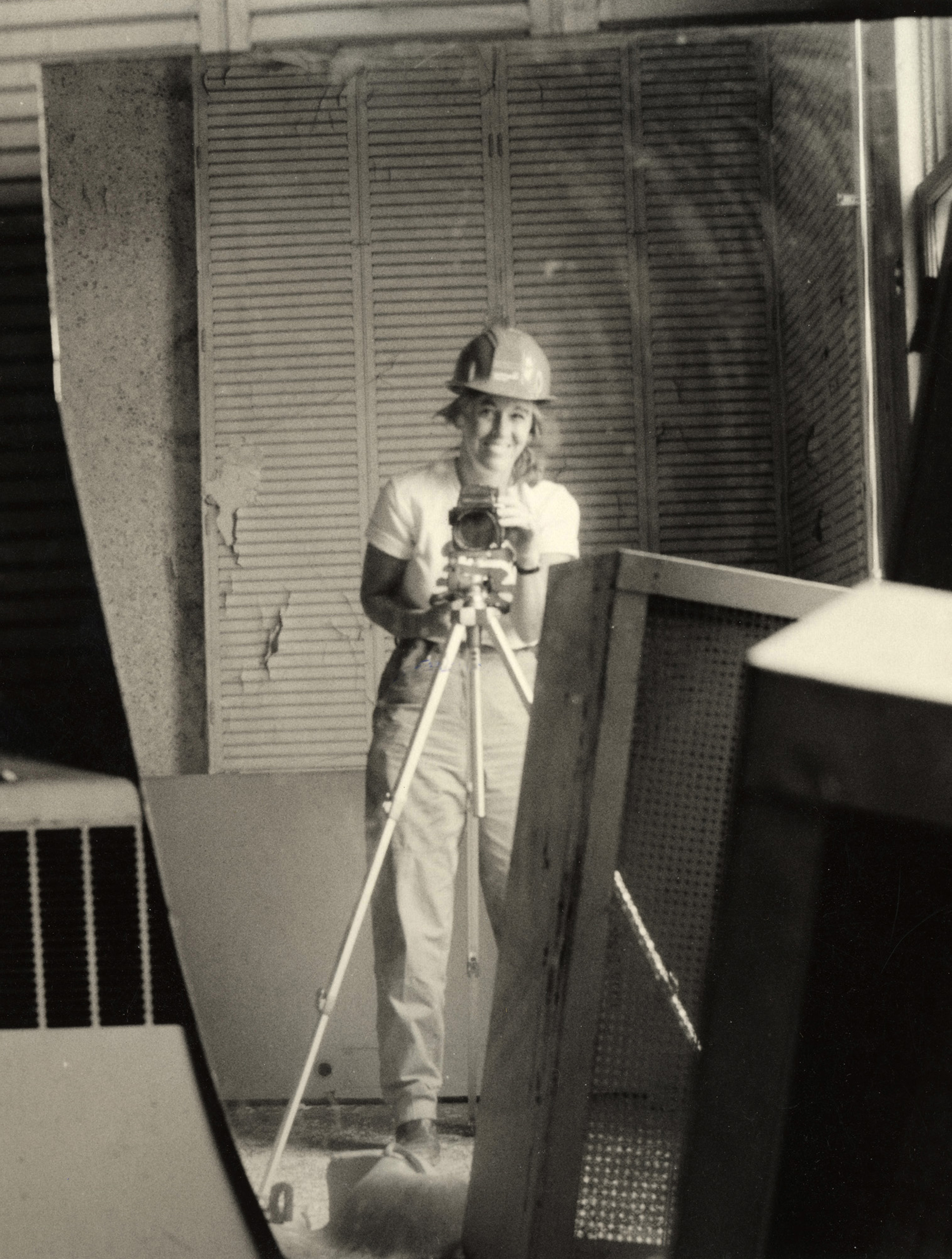
"Self portrait of photographer Carol M. Highsmith, via a broken mirror that she photographed during the Willard Hotel restoration," c. 1980–1990

Highsmith landed a contract to photograph another historic building on Pennsylvania Avenue, a turreted building called Sears House, which contained the Washington offices of the Sears, Roebuck Co., where Mathew Brady and his assistants photographed Washington luminaries during and after the Civil War. Her work at Sears House earned Highsmith her first photographic honor: a 1985 Award of Excellence from Communication Arts magazine.

When Landphair returned to Washington to join the Voice of America in 1986, he and Highsmith reconnected, and they married two years later. Landphair soon became the principal writer of books featuring Highsmith's work, as well as the historian, trip planner, driver, grip, and, as he put it, "Man Friday" on dozens of the couple's photography expeditions throughout the United States.

In 1992, the D.C. Preservation League exhibited Highsmith's cibachrome photos of Washington, D.C.

From 2000 to 2002, a three-year grant from the Annie E. Casey Foundation enabled Highsmith to photograph disadvantaged families in 22 cities where the foundation was active.

In her 2013 photographs of Torrey Pines Golf Course in San Diego, Highsmith made the Torrey pine, the endangered tree after which the golf course is named, the focal point. In a 2015 interview, Highsmith said that she considered her documentation of "living history and built environment" to be an "indestructible record of our vast nation, including sites that are fast fading, even disappearing, in the wake of growth, development, and decay."

Highsmith's decades-long project has photographed all 50 states and the District of Columbia. Her work includes photographs of Texas State Fair mascot "Big Tex" before he burned in a fire, and photographs of the Lower Manhattan skyline one month before the September 11 terrorist attacks in 2001.

Highsmith also photographed for, and her publishing company, Chelsea Publishing, Inc., published, six additional books: Forgotten No More, about the Korean War Veterans' Memorial; Union Station: A Decorative History, about Washington's historic train terminal; Reading Terminal and Market: Philadelphia's Gateway and Grand Convention Center; The Mount Washington: A Century of Grandeur; and Houston: Deep in the Heart.

Highsmith and her husband and collaborator Ted Landphair have published more than 35 "photographic tour" and "pictorial souvenir" coffee-table books, with most books focusing on a particular U.S. city, state, and region. Other photography books focus on lighthouses, barns, Amish culture, and the Appalachian Trail. Most are published by Crescent Books, an imprint of Random House in New York; a few others are published by Preservation Press, the publishing arm of the National Trust for Historic Preservation. Photographs include ordinary people and everyday sites as well as soaring architecture, natural landscapes, national parks and monuments, Civil War battlefields, and engineering marvels.

Highsmith's first work, Pennsylvania Avenue: America's Main Street, was published by the American Institute of Architects' AIA Press in 1988. In 1998, Random House sent Highsmith and Landphair to Ireland, where they visually represented every county of Northern Ireland and the Irish Republic, for Ireland: A Photographic Tour, their only book set outside the United States. In early 2002, Crescent Books published World Trade Center: Tribute and Remembrance, about the 2001 September 11 attacks in New York and exclusively featuring Highsmith's photographs, including aerial photographs of the Twin Towers two months before they fell.

That same year, Highsmith and Landphair collaborated on Deep in the Heart, a book about Houston, Texas, financed by that city's International Protocol Alliance. They also produced The Mount Washington: A Century of Grandeur, on the White Mountains resort. Highsmith also collaborated with architectural writer Dixie Legler on Historic Bridges of Maryland, published by the state's department of transportation.

In 2007, Highsmith photographed, and author Ryan Coonerty described, 52 monuments and other public sites in a National Geographic book Etched in Stone.

Alabama, the first state in Highsmith's "This is America" study Alabama, became the George F. Landegger Alabama Library of Congress Collection within the Highsmith archive at the national library.

George F. Landegger also donated funds to the Library of Congress to document Washington, D.C. neighborhoods and the state of Connecticut. The Connecticut study, intermingled with Highsmith's examinations of the two states (California and Texas) that followed Alabama. The Connecticut work, completed in 2015, culminated in both an archive of Highsmith images in the Library of Congress collection and a coffee-table book, simply titled Connecticut, published by Chelsea Publishing Inc. the same year.

Over two photographic journeys in California, first in late 2012 and then in early 2013, Highsmith and Landphair produced images for The Jon B. Lovelace California Library of Congress Collection.

In 2022, Highsmith published Why Louisiana Ain't Mississippi . . . or Any Place Else!, a name borrowed from a presentation by the state's Commissioner of Administration, Jay Dardenne, a former Louisiana lieutenant governor, who wrote both the book's introduction and an opening poem called "She is Louisiana." As usual in the select series of Highsmith state-specific books, husband Landphair wrote its many captions. Louisiana Public Broadcasting underwrote the book, using it as a companion to a new documentary about the state that also featured Highsmith's photos and Dardenne's stories and carried the "why Louisiana ain't Mississippi" reference in its title.

Highsmith has captured images of federally owned properties, such as U.S. courthouses, federal office buildings, and post offices, for the General Services Administration.

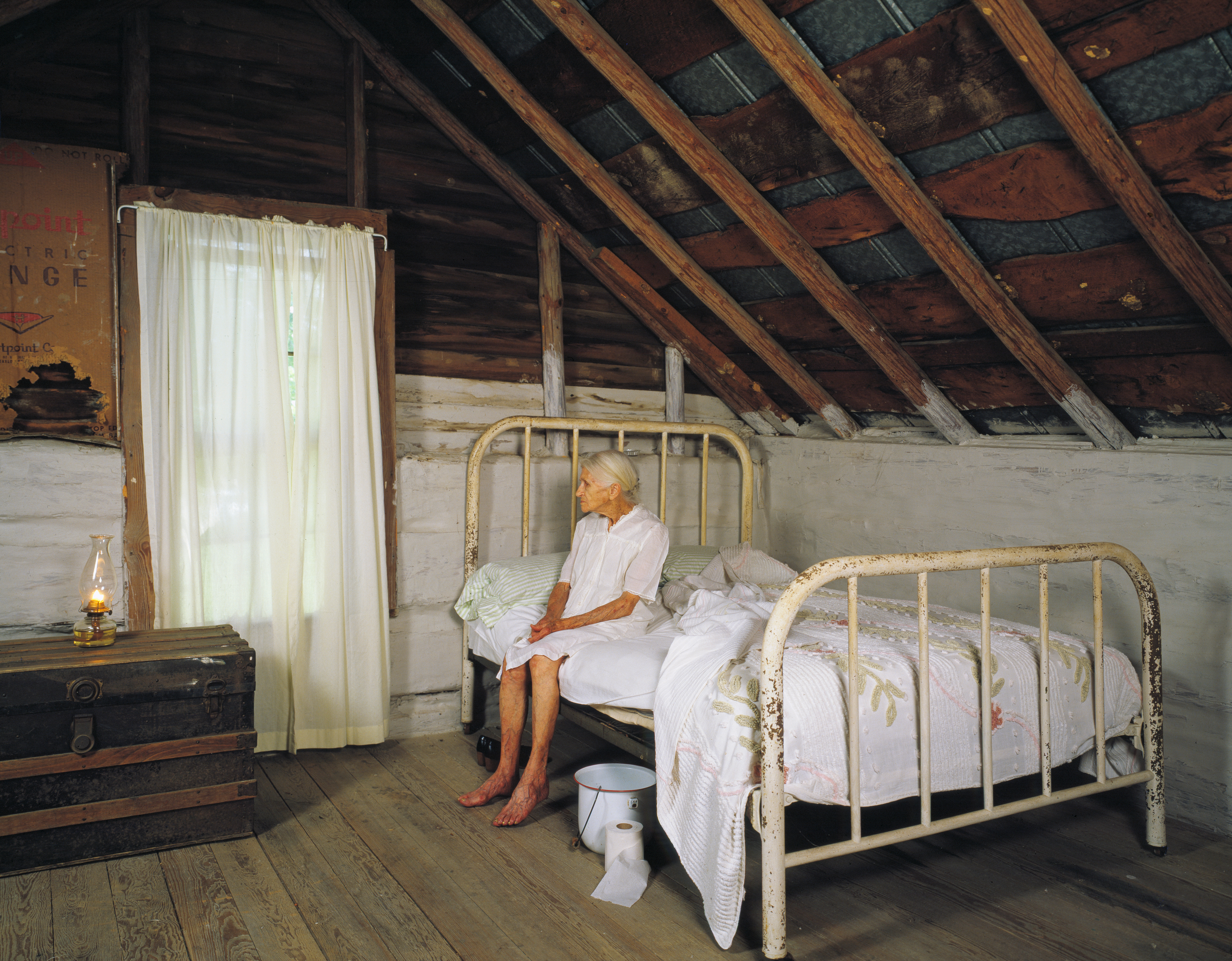
90-year-old Kate Carter in North Carolina log cabin

For the Trust's Preservation Press in 1994, Highsmith and Landphair produced their first national book, America Restored, as well as a book on Washington's foreign embassies. America Restored detailed two restoration projects in each state, including the extensive renovations of the Fordyce Bathhouse in Hot Springs, Arkansas; the Sheraton Palace Hotel in San Francisco; Rockwood Manor House in Wilmington, Delaware; Georgia's Jekyll Island Historic District; the covered bridges of Rush County, Indiana; Parlange Plantation in Louisiana; Broome County, New York's, carousels; and the Battleship Texas in Houston.

On commission from the National Park Service, Highsmith photographed homes, personal belongings, and collections of four presidents (Lincoln, Eisenhower, Truman, and Theodore Roosevelt) as well as poet Carl Sandburg, abolitionist Frederick Douglass, Confederate commander Robert E. Lee, African-American businesswoman and teacher Maggie Walker, the pioneer American nurse, Clara Barton, and the Nez Perce American Indian Nation. The Park Service produced a "virtual multi-media exhibit" of Highsmith's presidential collection photographs. In 2016 and 2017, Highsmith was the featured photographer in a Smithsonian National Museum of Natural History exhibit of national park images saluting the National Park Service's 100th anniversary.

== Style and reception ==
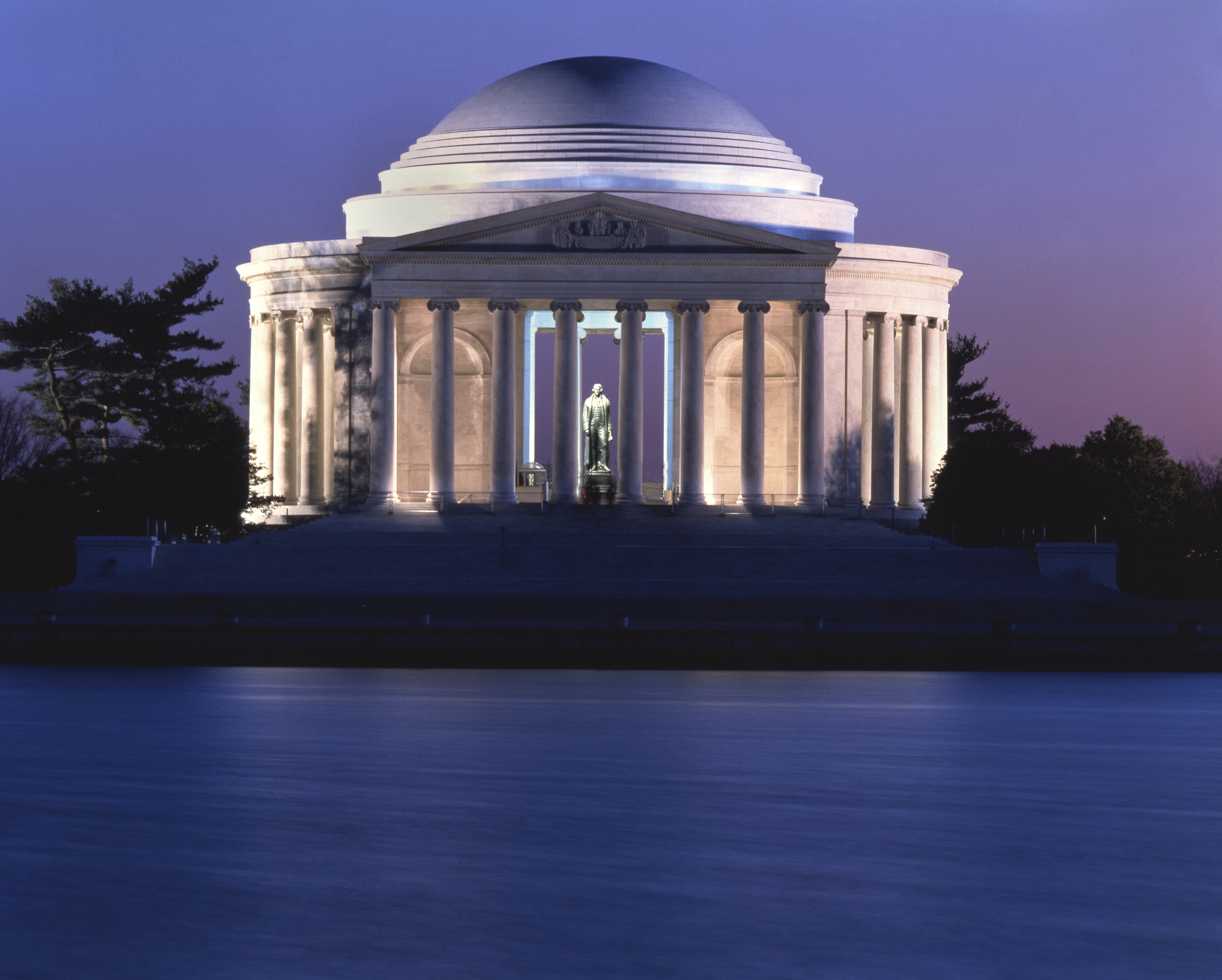
The Jefferson Memorial at dusk

Highsmith usually uses a Phase One IQ4 150-megapixel digital camera. In 2018, photography curator Anne Wilkes Tucker compared Highsmith's work to that of Ansel Adams, saying: “Highsmith's view of America is a positive one. She has an eye for beauty, It's an important view, but not the entire view." Highsmith sometimes documents buildings in various stages of renewal for contractors, architects, and developer: American Photographers magazine commented in 1989 on Highsmith's images: "Shooting enormous spaces in uncertain lighting conditions, her large format images reveal high quality and fine detail, capturing the splendor of the subject matter, be it a building in the midst of destruction or the elegance of a formal room." In a December 2024 interview with the National Trust for Historic Preservation, she stated that she sees her photographs as more akin to historic records than works of art. When asked, "How do you know when you’ve taken a good photograph?" she replied, "Is there a bad photograph, is my question."

== Donations to Library of Congress ==
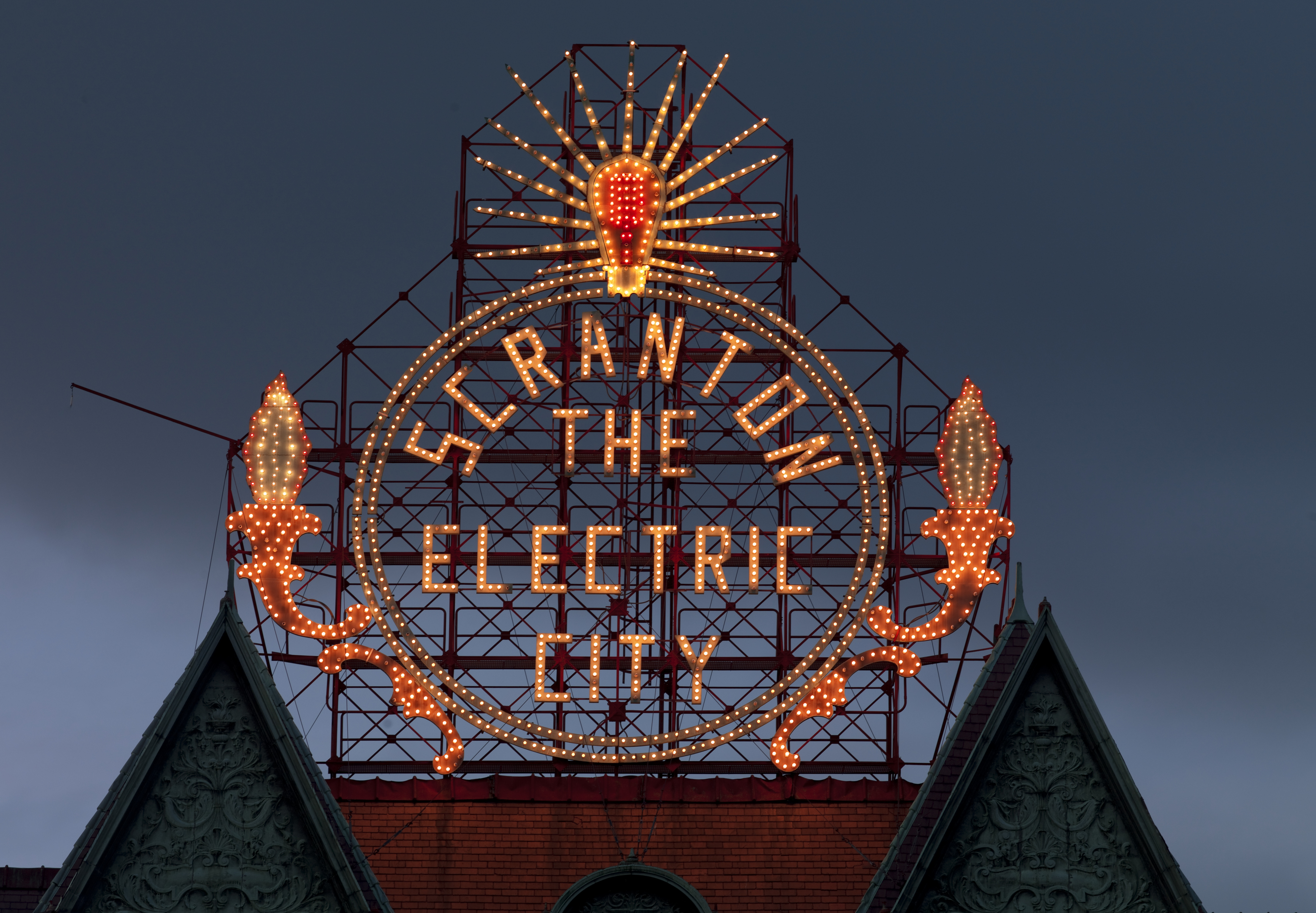
Electric City sign in Scranton, Pennsylvania

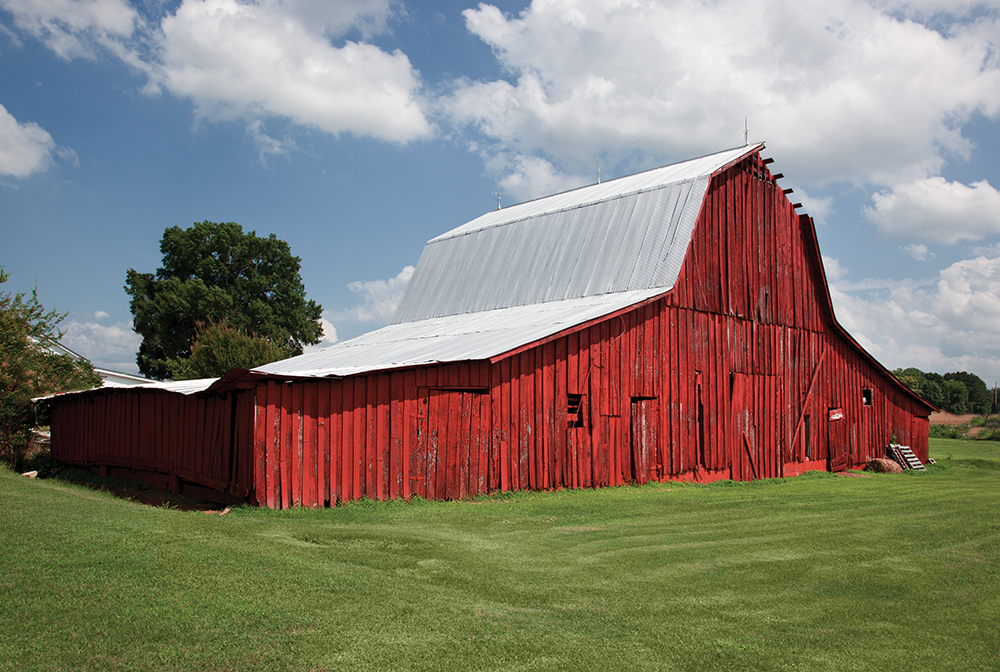
Old red barn near Muscle Shoals in northern Alabama

Highsmith has donated her catalogue of photographs documenting American life and places to the Library of Congress. In 1992, the LOC accepted 500 of Highsmith's photographs as the first installment of her continuing work to document architectural transitions in the nation's capital. By 2017, she had donated about 42,000 photographs to the LOC, with the goal of donating 100,000 images. Beginning in 2002, she began to provide digitally shot scans and photographs to the LOC, allowing for quicker access online. By early 2021, the LOC Prints and Photographs Division held close to 100,000 photographs taken by Highsmith, and she was "the only living photographer documenting America's milestones to have an individual namesake collection."

Highsmith's donations create a copyright-free and royalty-free archive of photographs; the Library of Congress has said that Highsmith's "generosity in dedicating the rights to the American people for free access" has made the Archives a valuable resource. C. Ford Peatross, the former director of LOC's Center for Architecture called Highsmith's donation of her photography "one of the greatest acts of generosity" in LOC's history, contributing to a new "permanent record of the country and its people for the common good."

In 2009, the LOC acquired Highsmith's "born digital" collection (photographs that originated in the digital format rather than as film transferred to digital) and made it available as Carol M. Highsmith's America: Documenting the 21st Century. The collection emphasizes what Highsmith calls "Disappearing America," including 200 shots taken along U.S. Route 66 in Arizona, New Mexico, Texas, and Oklahoma.

Highsmith has also photographed the LOC's own facilities, such as the Thomas Jefferson Building, in several series. Some of these photographs were included in a 2013 e-book, Great Photographs From the Library of Congress.

In 2016, the nonprofit Creative Commons wrote that "Highsmith's project predates our work as Creative Commons, but her work is very much in the spirit of our community. By removing copyright restrictions from her photographs, Highsmith is engaged in the important work of growing a robust commons built on gratitude and usability; her singular archive at the Library of Congress is a testament to one woman's passion and generosity."

== Influences ==
Highsmith cites two female photographers, Frances Benjamin Johnston and Dorothea Lange, as influences. Johnston, whom Highsmith calls her "beau ideal," produced studies of southern plantations, African-American and American Indian schools, national parks, and studio portraits of prominent Americans from the 1890s to 1950s. Johnston donated her lifetime body of photographic work to the Library of Congress, prompting Highsmith to do the same. Johnston and Highsmith took self-portraits, perched in the same location beneath a rock formation in Yellowstone National Park, a century apart. Lange is remembered for her fieldwork for the federal Farm Security Administration among migrant workers and other dispossessed families during the Great Depression of the 1930s; Highsmith returned to the subject decades later, photographing surviving shacks in the Weedpatch "Okie" camp in Kern County, California, that was the setting for much of John Steinbeck's novel The Grapes of Wrath.

== Getty Images/Alamy lawsuit ==
In July 2016, Highsmith sued two stock photography organizations, Getty Images and Alamy, and their agents, over their attempts to assert copyright over, and charge fees for the use of, 18,755 of her images, after Getty sent her a bill for one of her own images that she had used on her own website. In November 2016, the judge hearing the case dismissed much of Highsmith's case on grounds that she had relinquished her claim of copyright when she donated much of her work to the Library of Congress. The remainder of the lawsuit was settled by the parties out of court.

== Commissions and awards ==
- Award of Excellence, Communications Arts Magazine, 1985
- Pennsylvania Avenue Development Commission, 1987
- Crescent Books Imprint, Random House Publishers, 36 books, 1997–2003
- Photography of historic Federal buildings and art, for the General Services Administration, from 1999
- Photography of presidential and other notables' belongings for the Museum Management Program of the National Park Service
- Exclusive photographer of the American Institute of Architects (AIA) 150, America's Favorite Architecture, 2007
- General Services Administration Design Award, 2009
- In 2010, Highsmith photographed Alabama as the first state in her "21st Century America" project, funded by businessman George F. Landegger, whose family had operated pulp plants in the state. Landegger then donated funds to the Library of Congress for Highsmith to continue documentation of the American states.
- During 2012 and 2013 Highsmith worked throughout California, visually documenting the entire state. The collection, known as the Jon B. Lovelace California Collection at the Library of Congress, was funded by the Capital Group, a California investment firm, in memory of Lovelace, who died in 2011.
- Forty-eight of Highsmith's images were included in Not an Ostrich: and Other Images from America's Library, a 2018 exhibition at the Annenberg Space for Photography in Los Angeles, assembled by curator Anne Wilkes Tucker from among the LOC's collection. The exhibit's title was borrowed from a 1930 photograph in the national library's collection of a rare, fluffy-feathered goose held by an actress at a Madison Square Garden poultry show, thought to be taken by an unnamed photographer in the employ of the Underwood & Underwood Co. that produced stereograph views. Highsmith spoke at the Annenberg Space for Photography as part of its Iris Nights Lecture Series.
- Two of Highsmith's photographs have been chosen by the U.S. Postal Service to be featured on U.S. postage stamps: an image of the Jefferson Memorial (selected in 2002). a tightly-cropped, black-and-white image of the statue of Lincoln at the Lincoln Memorial (issued 2014).
- Inducted into the Minnehaha Academy Hall of Fame.

== Updates on recent activities as of February 2026 ==
In 2025, Highsmith and Landphair returned from a photo-gathering expedition in the American West, at which time they noted that they had put 134,000 miles on their 2019 Ford Expedition and had, in toto, topped 2 million miles on the road since their travels on several projects leading to image donations to the Library of Congress that began 44 years previously.

They immediately began trips closer to their home in Hagerstown, Maryland, gathering images for a 256-page coffee-table book about their home state of Maryland, the eighth such volume in a series about individual U.S. states — this one published by Highsmith's Chelsea Publishing, LLC in partnership with Maryland Public Television.

Over the years, a production team from the nationwide Public Broadcasting System, had caught up with Highsmith "in action" in several locations across the country, in preparation for a PBS documentary, "Capturing America: the Carol Highsmith Story," scheduled to debut on PBS stations beginning in July 2026.
