= J. P. Carter =

American military officer, politician and educator (1915–2000)

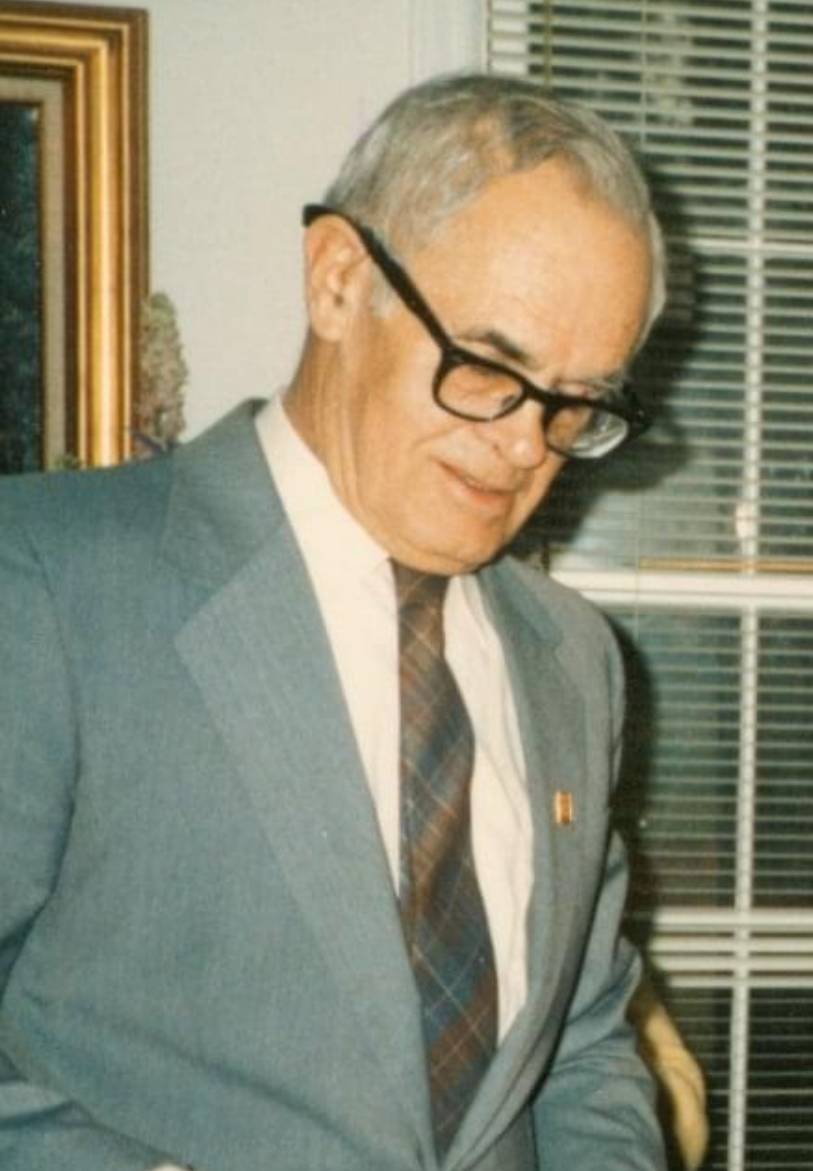
- Carter in 1992

Mayor of Madison
- In office 1978–1991
- Succeeded by: George M. Hayes Jr.

Member of the Madison Board of Aldermen
- In office 1992–1993

Personal details
- Born: August 20, 1915 Rockingham County, North Carolina, US
- Died: December 19, 2000 (aged 85) Danbury, North Carolina, US
- Resting place: Sardis Primitive Baptist Church Cemetery; Madison, North Carolina
- Party: Democratic Party
- Spouse: Nancy Elizabeth Martin
- Children: 4 (including Linda)
- Parent(s): Yancey Ligon Carter; Mary Elizabeth Morton
- Education: Wake Forest College; UNC Greensboro

Military service
- Allegiance: United States
- Branch/service: United States Army
- Years of service: 1934–1958
- Rank: Private; Staff sergeant Lieutenant colonel
- Battles/wars: World War II • North African campaign • Italian campaign Korean War

James Pratt Carter (August 20, 1915 – December 19, 2000) was a United States Army officer, politician and educator. During his career in the army, he served in World War II and the Korean War, retiring from the army in 1958 with the rank of lieutenant colonel. He was the mayor of Madison, North Carolina for twelve years and later served on the town's Board of Aldermen.

== Early life ==
Carter was born on August 20, 1915, in Rockingham County, North Carolina, to Yancey Ligon Carter and Mary Elizabeth Morton, who were prominent tobacco farmers in the Bethany community. He was the thirteenth of fifteen children. Carter was raised in the Baptist tradition. His grandfather, Pleasant Jiles Carter, was a North Carolinian planter. Carter's great-grandfather, Thomas B. Carter, owned a large tobacco plantation in what is now Wentworth.

The birthplace of J. P. Carter's father on the Carter Plantation

His family descends from the colonist Reverend Thomas Carter, a Puritan minister in the Massachusetts Bay Colony and signer of the Dedham Covenant.

== Career ==
=== Military ===
Carter enlisted in the United States Army as a private in 1934, after graduating from Madison High School. He served in World War II with the rank of staff sergeant, as part of the 20th Infantry Regiment, and was deployed to North Africa and Italy. He also served in the Korean War and was stationed in Japan. He was decorated for his service in World War II. During World War II, four of his brothers were also serving. His mother was awarded a "five-starred emblem" by the Legion of Honor Association for having five sons serve at one time. The award was presented at the President's Birthday Ball at the town armory. He retired from the army as a lieutenant colonel in 1958.

=== Education ===
Carter graduated from Wake Forest College in Winston-Salem in 1961 with a degree in education. Carter later earned a master's degree from the University of North Carolina at Greensboro. He worked as a public school teacher at Madison-Mayodan High School, where he taught social studies. He was later appointed principal of Elliott Duncan Elementary School in Mayodan, a position he held until his retirement in 1977.

=== Politics ===
In 1977 Carter was elected mayor of Madison. He assumed office in 1978 and served until 1991. In 1990 Carter dismissed Barry and Debbie Walker's charges of harassment against Phillip Webster, a town alderman, calling the charges a "personal vendetta" that the town "would no longer tolerate". The Walkers accused Webster of harassment when ordering bushes on their property bordering U.S. Route 311 be trimmed by town workers. Carter told them to contact the district attorney if they felt a crime had been committed. He also stated that, were Webster guilty of violating a town ordinance, it would not be grounds for removal from the town's Board of Aldermen.

In 1991, Carter supported a one-cent tax increase, to generate $273,000 annually as funding to maintain Chinqua Penn Plantation.

On March 6, 1991, Carter was a speaker at a victory march and rally for United States troops who served in the Gulf War. The demonstration, sponsored by the Rockingham County Patriots, was held at Rockingham County High School.

After his time as mayor, he served on town's Board of Aldermen for two years.

== Personal life ==
Carter was the uncle of folk artist Benny Carter and photographer Carol M. Highsmith. He was a Baptist and served as a deacon and trustee at First Baptist Church of Madison. He was a member of the Madison Lions Club and was named a Melvin Jones Fellow by the organization.

He married Nancy Elizabeth Martin in 1941. They had four daughters: Dorothy Jean Carter Seeman, Gerry Carter, Linda Carter Brinson, and Vicki Carter Alexander.

In 1998, Carter was named Madison's Citizen of the Year.

Carter died on December 19, 2000, aged 85, at Stokes-Reynolds Memorial Hospital in Danbury, North Carolina. His funeral was held at First Baptist Church of Madison. He is buried in the cemetery at Sardis Primitive Baptist Church in Madison.
