= Linda Carter Brinson =

American journalist and writer (born 1948)

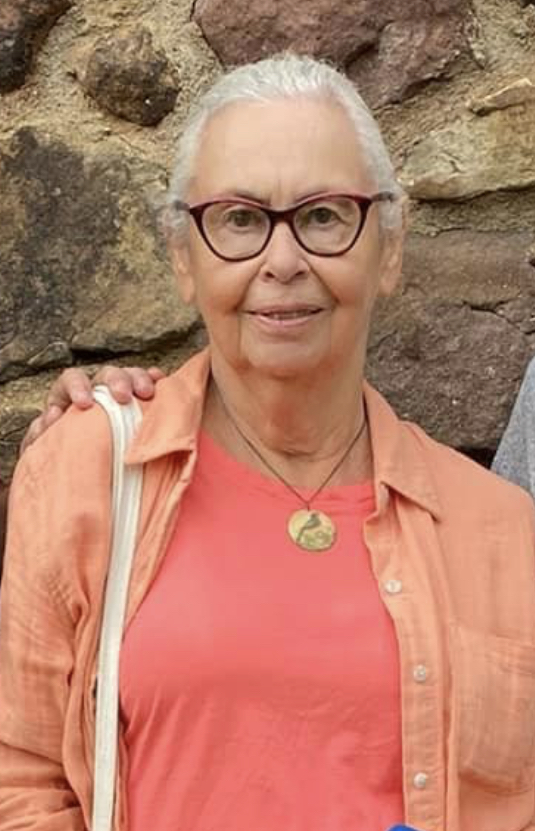
- Brinson in 2022
- Born: Linda Sue Carter; June 25, 1948 (age 78)
- Education: Madison-Mayodan High School; Wake Forest University (BA); University of North Carolina at Greensboro (MFA)
- Occupations: Writer, journalist, editor
- Spouses: Lloyd George Brinson Jr.
- Children: 2
- Parent(s): James Pratt Carter (father); Nancy Elizabeth Martin (mother)
- Website: lindabrinson.com

Linda Sue Carter Brinson (born June 25, 1948) is an American writer, journalist, and editor. She was the first woman assistant national editor at The Baltimore Sun and the first woman editorial page editor at the Winston-Salem Journal.

== Early life and education ==
Brinson was born on June 25, 1948, to James Pratt Carter and Nancy Elizabeth Martin. Her father was a military officer and politician who served as the mayor of Madison, North Carolina. She descends from the Thomas Carter Family, a planting family in Rockingham County who owned a tobacco plantation near Wentworth. She is a first cousin of photographer Carol M. Highsmith and the late folk artist Benny Carter. Brinson was raised in the Baptist tradition. She graduated from Madison-Mayodan High School in 1966 and went on to obtain a degree in journalism and English literature from Wake Forest University in 1969. While a student at Wake Forest, she was an editor of the Old Gold & Black. In 1987 Carter obtained a Master of Fine Arts degree in creative writing from the University of North Carolina at Greensboro.

== Career ==
Brinson worked as an editorial page editor and book review editor for the Winston-Salem Journal and as a writer for Wake Forest Magazine. In 1970, as a journalist for Wake Forest Magazine, Carter interviewed Edward Reynolds, who was the first African-American undergraduate from Wake Forest University. After working as a journalist in North Carolina, she moved to Maryland and became an assistant national editor at The Baltimore Sun. She was the first woman to hold that position at the newspaper. While at The Baltimore Sun, she covered the resignation of U.S. Vice President Spiro Agnew, the Watergate scandal, and the resignation of U.S. President Richard Nixon.

Brinson moved back to North Carolina in the late 1970s and worked as a reporter, editorial page writer, and feature writer for The Sentinel, an afternoon newspaper in Winston-Salem. After the paper folded in 1985, she began writing book reviews and feature stories for the Winston-Salem Journal. She was later appointed the first woman editorial page editor at the Journal. She left the Winston-Salem Journal in 2008 and started her own blog, Briar Patch Books, where she writes book reviews. In 2013 she wrote for Baptist News Global. She has also worked as a book reviewer and feature writer for the News & Record. As a freelance writer, she has written for Our State and is a regular contributor to the editorial pages for the News & Record and The Virginian-Pilot. Brinson was inducted into the Wake Forest Writers Hall of Fame in 2018.

Brinson was an adjunct faculty member at the University of North Carolina at Chapel Hill's Hussman School of Journalism and Mass Communication. She also taught journalism at Wake Forest University.

== Personal life ==
Brinson lives in Currituck, North Carolina, with her husband, Lloyd George Brinson, Jr. They have two children, James Carter Brinson and Naval Lieutenant Commander Sam Brinson.

Brinson served as a board member of the Salem College Center for Women Writers. Prior to her conversion to the Episcopal Church, she served as chairwoman of the board of deacons at First Baptist Church of Madison. Since her conversion, she has been a parishioner St. Luke's Episcopal Mission and later All Saints Episcopal Church in Southern Shores.
