= First Baptist Church (Madison, North Carolina) =

Church in Madison, North Carolina

First Baptist Church of Madison
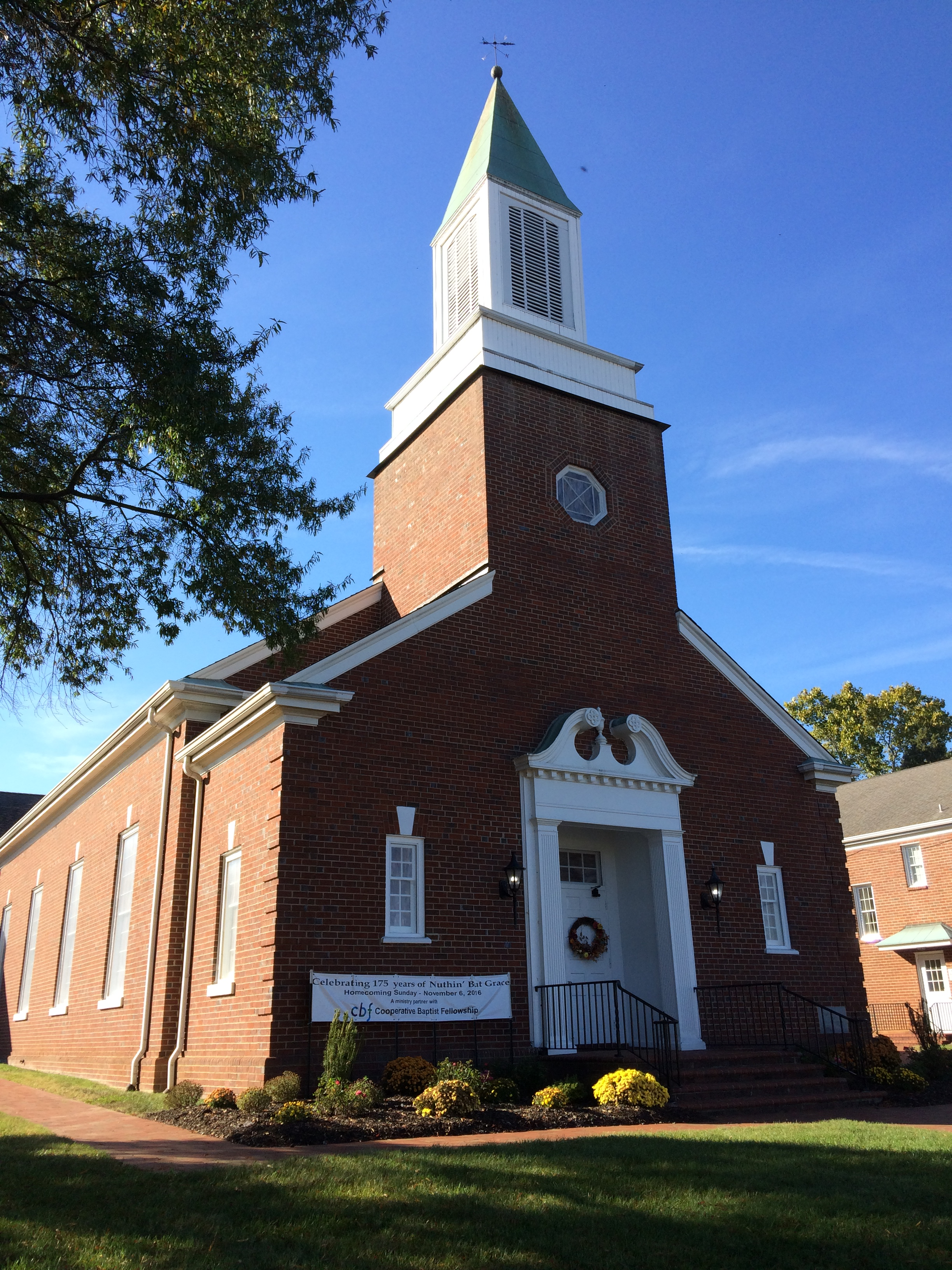

Religion
- Affiliation: Missionary Baptist
- Leadership: Cooperative Baptist Fellowship
- Year consecrated: 1841
- Status: active

Location
- Location: 110 S. Franklin Street, Madison, North Carolina, United States
- State: North Carolina
- Interactive map of First Baptist Church of Madison
- Coordinates: 36°23′12″N 79°57′43″W

Website
- firstbaptistchurchofmadison.org

The First Baptist Church of Madison, originally called Madison Missionary Baptist Church, is a historic Baptist church located in downtown Madison, North Carolina. The congregation of the church is Missionary Baptist, and under the jurisdiction of the Cooperative Baptist Fellowship. The church, built in 1850, served both the white planter and the black enslaved populations of Madison during the Antebellum era.

== History ==
The congregation of First Baptist was founded on November 6, 1841. On June 28, 1849, two half-acre plots were purchased in Rockingham County, North Carolina, and another plot purchased on February 13, 1851, for the use of a church. Original documents of the Church were destroyed in a fire, but it is believed the building was completed in 1850. The original building was renovated in 1955. The church, built during the Antebellum period, provided a gallery seating for slaves who attended religious services with their plantation masters, many of whom were tobacco planters. The slave gallery was removed in the 1890s. Following primitive baptist tradition, preaching was held every fourth Saturday and Sunday of the month instead of weekly. The congregation performed baptisms in the Dan River. Silver goblets, silver plates, and a silver pitcher were used for Communion services from 1891 to 1919, which were later purchased by the Ladies Missionary Society. The church was a member of Beulah Association for fifty years before joining the Pilot Mountain Association in 1891. It remained a member of that association until the Dan Valley Missionary Baptist Association was formed in 1947.

Lewis Hall Shuck, the Church's pastor from 1860-1863, was born in Singapore, the son of Jehu Lewis Shuck and Henrietta Hall Shuck, the first American woman to go to China as a missionary.

== Notable parishioners ==
- J. P. Carter, American politician and military officer, served on the Board of Deacons
- Linda Carter Brinson, American editor and writer, served as Chairwoman of the Board of Deacons
