= Wright Tavern (Wentworth, North Carolina) =

- U.S. National Register of Historic Places
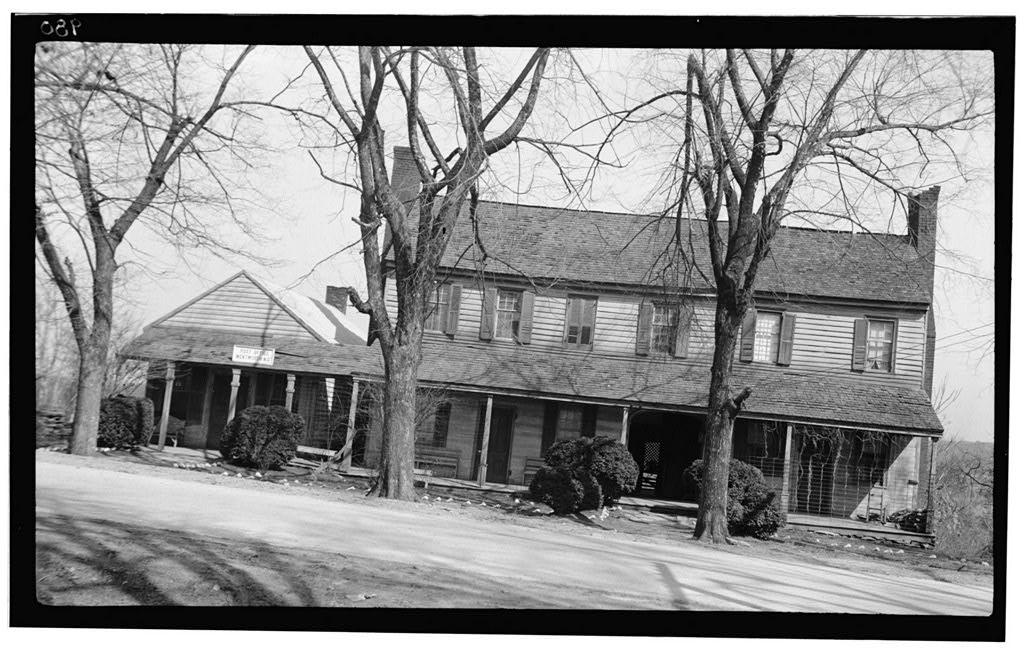
- Wright Tavern c. 1934

- Location within North Carolina Location within the United States
- Location: NC 65, Wentworth, North Carolina
- Coordinates: 36°23′54″N 79°46′13″W
- Area: 2 acres (0.81 ha)
- Built: c. 1814
- Architectural style: Federal
- NRHP reference No.: 70000467
- Added to NRHP: September 15, 1970

Wright Tavern, also known as the Reid House and Reid Hotel, is a historic inn and tavern located at Wentworth, Rockingham County, North Carolina. The oldest section was built about 1816, and is a two-story, four-bay, building with Federal style interior design elements. It takes the form of a "dog run" house. It was the birthplace and home of U.S. Congressman James Wesley Reid (1849—1902). It was restored in the early-1970s by the Rockingham County Historical Society.

It was listed on the National Register of Historic Places in 1970.
