= Christopher Knight (filmmaker) =

American film producer

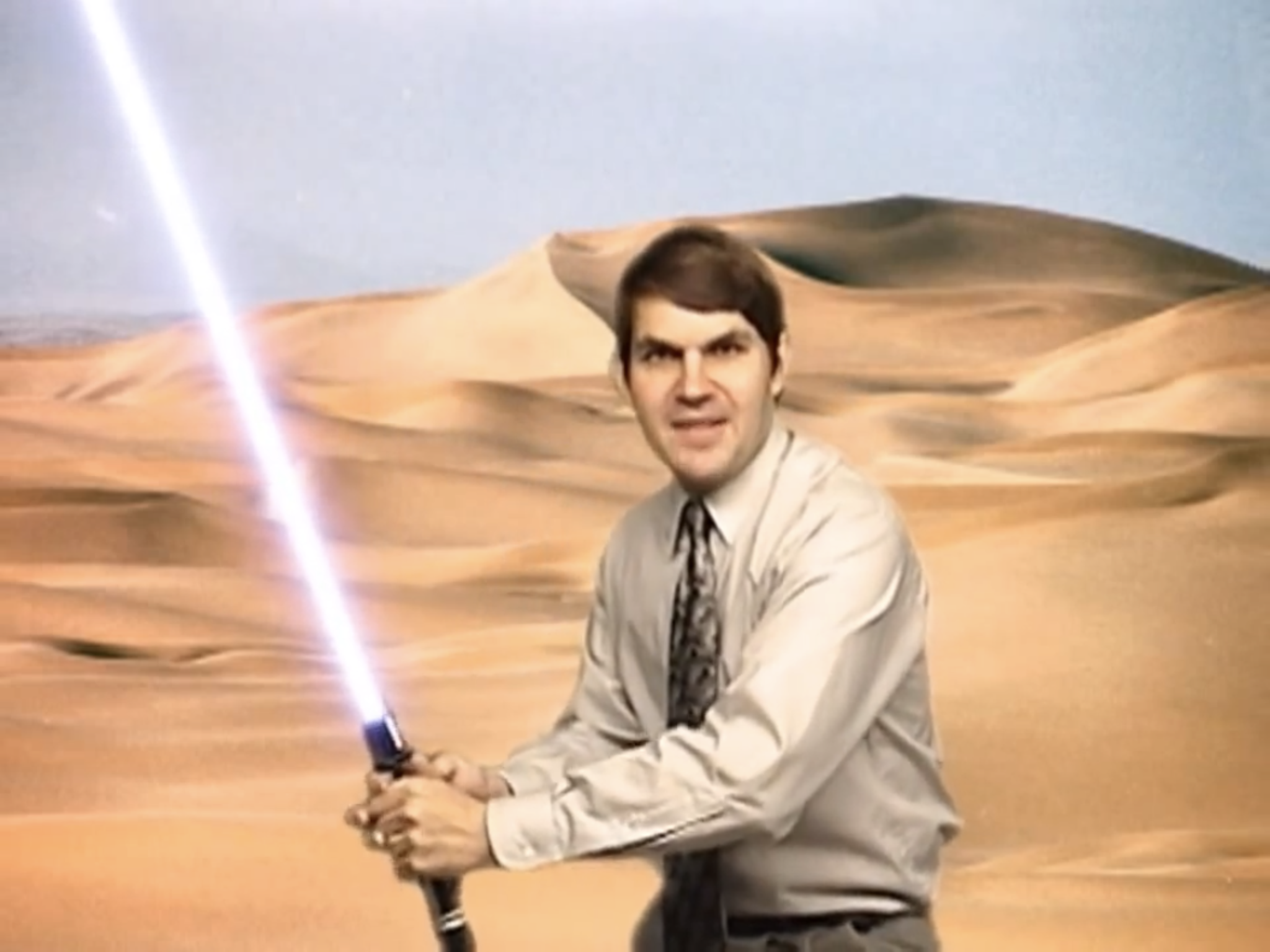
- Knight in his 2006 campaign commercial for Rockingham County, North Carolina's board of education
- Born: Robert Christopher Knight; 1973/1974 (age 51–49)

Robert Christopher Knight (born 1973/1974) is a blogger and filmmaker based in the Greenville, South Carolina area who received much attention for a video he uploaded to YouTube and a subsequent copyright infringement clash with Viacom. The incident has since gone on to be cited in numerous legal writings and court cases involving digital copyright and the interests of corporations versus independent content producers.

== Education ==
Knight graduated from Rockingham County Senior High School in 1992. He earned an Associate of Arts degree from Rockingham Community College in Wentworth, North Carolina. In 1999, he received a Bachelor of Arts degree in Historical Studies from Elon University in Elon, North Carolina.

== Career ==
Knight ran for one of five new at-large seats on the Rockingham County, North Carolina Board of Education in 2006, and self-produced a series of television commercials for his campaign. Knight paid for airtime and the commercials were broadcast on WGSR Star 39 from Reidsville, North Carolina in the month leading up to the November 7 election.

The first commercial that Knight created, dubbed simply "Christopher Knight for School Board Commercial #1", played off the Star Wars movies. In the one-minute spot, the Death Star destroys a tiny red schoolhouse while a female voice actress describes how legislation like No Child Left Behind has turned the federal government into a "cosmic bully" that is "targeting and destroying our ability to best teach our children". The second half of the commercial features Knight wielding a blue-bladed lightsaber, describing how he is a "fiscal conservative" who wants more local control over the county's schools. The commercial ends with Knight twirling the lightsaber in a flourish as he vows "to defend a bright and shining future for the children of Rockingham County".

Knight uploaded the commercial to YouTube, and it soon became noticed by a larger audience. In the weeks before the election, it was featured in many regional newspapers, was shown on the Fox News Channel and was mentioned in The New York Times. By the end of the year, the "Star Wars" school board ad had aroused the attention of Edutopia, the magazine of the George Lucas Educational Foundation, which declared Knight's commercial to be the "Best Campaign Ad Ever".

Knight aired two more commercials before the election, but he failed to win a seat. He came in 8th place out of 16 candidates who ran, which was the largest slate for a single race in Rockingham County history.

Over the next several months, Knight's commercial was screened at the American Film Institute, and was featured on The Heritage Foundation's website and in many other media outlets including The Jay Leno Show, The Soup, on MTV and numerous international programming.

=== VH1/Viacom/YouTube copyright infringement claim ===
The television program Web Junk 20 on VH1 aired a special presentation titled "Animals and Other Crap" in July 2007. The show, which highlights funny and unusual video clips found on the Internet, showed Knight's first school board commercial along with commentary by host Aries Spears. Knight later said that no one from the network had approached him about using his commercial for a for-profit broadcast, or had even told him that it would be aired by the network. However, Knight also said that he thought that the show was so good and Spears' commentary to be so witty, that he didn't mind that VH1 used it at all. As he had done with his original commercial, Knight uploaded the Web Junk 20 segment on YouTube so that he could share it with friends.

On August 29, 2007, YouTube notified Knight him that his video of the Web Junk 20 clip had been taken down at the insistence of VH1's parent company Viacom, claiming Knight's use of the clip was copyright infringement and violated the Digital Millennium Copyright Act (DMCA). Upon being presented with the claim, YouTube had no choice but to pull it per DMCA mandate. Knight objected, as Web Junk 20 had lifted his own material, and claimed that Viacom had violated his copyright first.

Knight contended that per the Copyright Act of 1976, his uploading of the Web Junk 20 clip featuring his own commercial satisfied the four criteria for fair use. and that VH1's segment was a derivative work of his own, since the Web Junk 20 clip was based on Knight's original commercial and could not have existed without it. Viacom countered that the Web Junk 20 clip was indeed its own copyrighted material, acknowledging that although it used the commercial that Knight had produced himself, that VH1 had added Aries Spears's image and commentary. Viacom asserted that this was enough to make the entire content of the Web Junk 20 clip, including use of Knight's commercial, their own material protected under copyright.

Following guidelines on YouTube's site, Knight filed a Digital Millennium Copyright Act counter-notification claim, and per DMCA provisions, Viacom was legally bound to take one of two options: to take Knight to court and file a lawsuit against him for copyright infringement, or to let the video be restored on YouTube. After the story gained considerable press coverage, Viacom relented, and YouTube reinstated Knight's clip of Web Junk 20 featuring his campaign commercial.

The incident has since been referenced in several other stories regarding YouTube and cases of possible copyright infringement, including that of the Lenz family's lawsuit against Universal regarding a clip they had posted onto YouTube that included several seconds of a song by musical artist Prince.

After Viacom relented and dropped its claim, Knight asserted that he had no ill toward Viacom and asked his readers to do likewise. "This ends just as I had hoped it would: with the clip back up and, I like to think, with Viacom and me getting to shake hands and move on and wishing each other well. I'll certainly harbor no hard feelings toward Viacom for the past two weeks."

== Sources ==
- Wired: Viacom: Fair Use Is What We Say It Is, August 31, 2007
- Cheng, Jacqui (August 30, 2007). "Viacom's "bass-ackwards" screw-up: issues takedown for video it "pirated"". Ars Technica.
- "Viacom slaps YouTuber for behaving like Viacom". The Register. August 30, 2007.
- WebProNews: Small Town Man: Victim or Copyright Infringer? August 31, 2007
- vnunet.com: YouTube restores Viacom-banned VH-1 clip, September 13, 2007
- The Inquirer: YouTube restores clip downed by Viacom, September 13, 2007
- contactmusic.com: VH1 - School Board Candidate Beats Viacom, September 14, 2007
- IMDB.com Studio Briefing: School Board Candidate Beats Viacom, September 14, 2007
