= Kristin Congdon =

American writer and professor

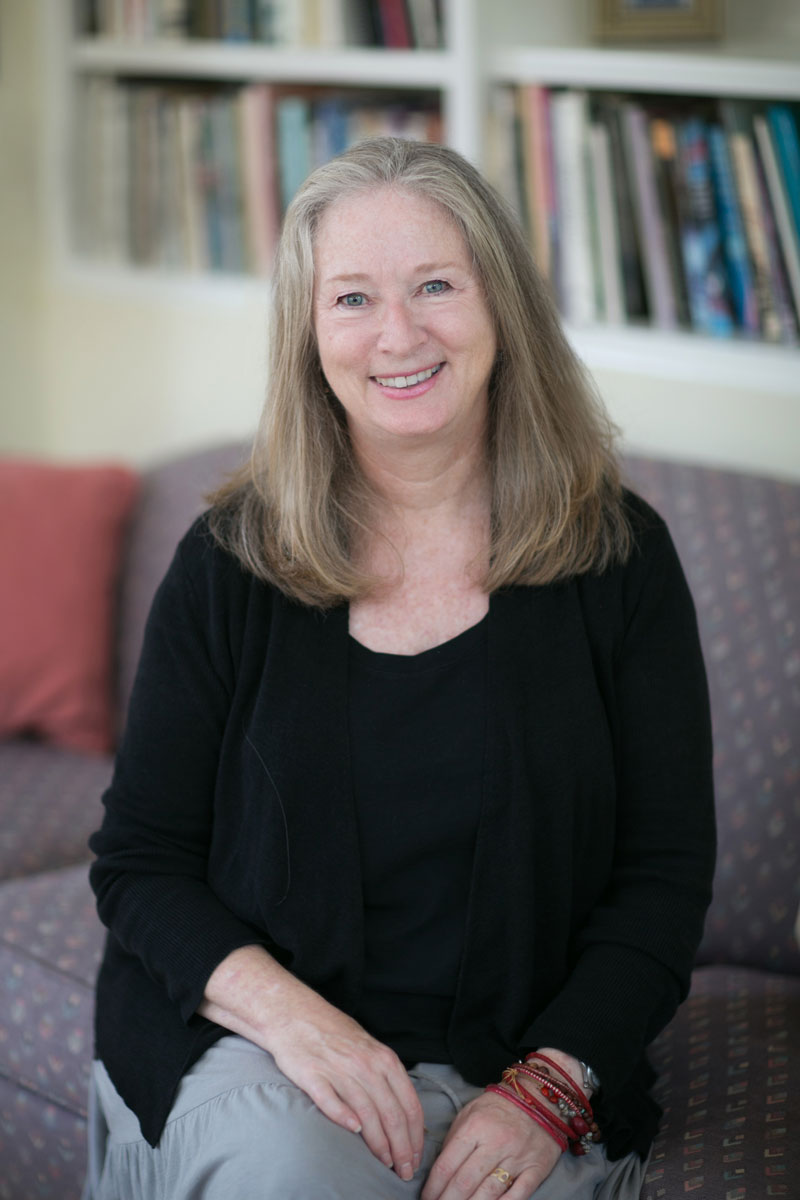
Kristin Congdon

Kristin G. Congdon is an American artist, writer and a Professor Emerita of Philosophy and Humanities at the University of Central Florida. In her work she focuses on folk art, art education, art history, and feminism. She is the founding director of the Cultural Heritage Alliance at the University of Central Florida (UCF), which supports research into folk arts and folk arts education. She has written or contributed to over a dozen books on folk arts and is on the Editorial Board of the journal Artizein: Arts and Teaching Journal. She has also been on many other journal boards, including the International Journal of Education in the Art, Visual Culture and Gender, and Visual Arts Education. Most importantly, she has been the Senior Editor of Studies in Art Education and the Senior Editor of the Journal of Research in Art Education. She has toured with her art in Florida.

== Career ==
External videos
- “UCF professor Kristin Congdon on folk art”, UCF Profiles, University of Central Florida

Congdon received her Ph.D. from the University of Oregon in Art Education. She has contributed to several books and publications. She contributed several essays about Día de los Muertos to the book Of Corpse: Death and Humor in Folklore and Popular Culture by Peter Narvaez. Congdon co-wrote the book Happy Clouds, Happy Trees about Bob Ross, which was reviewed favorably by the Washington Post. Congdon contributed to the book Cassadaga: The South's Oldest Spiritualist Community. She has spoken and written about feminism in art education and other topics related to women in art.

Congdon and Tina Bucuvalas spent five years creating a traveling exhibition which is based on the book Just Above the Water: Florida Folk Art and toured with it in museums all over Florida, including at the St. Petersburg Museum of History.

Congdon is a Professor Emerita at the University of Central Florida.

== Published works ==
- Art in a Democracy (1987, Teachers College Press, co-editor and contributor)
- Pluralistic Approaches to Art Criticism (1992, Bowling Green University, co-editor and contributor)
- Women Art Educators III (1993, co-editor)
- Evaluating Art Education Programs in Community Centers (1998, co-editor)
- Remembering Others: Making Invisible Histories of Art Education Visible (2000, co-editor)
- Histories of Community-based Art Education (2001, co-editor)
- Uncle Monday and Other Florida Tales (2001, University Press of Mississippi)
- Artist from Latin American Cultures: A Biographical Dictionary (2002, Greenwood Press, with Kara Kelley Hallmark)
- Of Corpse: Death and Humor in Folklore and Popular Culture (2003, contributor)
- Community Art in Action (2004, Davis Publications)
- Just above the Water: Florida Folk Art (2006, University Press of Mississippi, with Tina Bucuvalas)
- American Folk Art: A Regional Reference (2012, ABC-CLIO, with Kara Kelley Hallmark, 2 volumes)
- Happy Clouds and Happy Trees: The Bob Ross Phenomenon. (2014, University Press of Mississippi, with Doug Blandy and Danny Coeyman)
- Roots and Legends: Folktales from African American Cultures (2025, with Wellsfleeet Press)
- The Making of an Artist: Desire, Courage, and Commitment (2018, Intellect/University of Chicago Press)
- Twentieth Century United States Photographers (2008, Greenwood Group, with Kara Kelley Hallmark)

== Awards and honors ==
- National Art Education Association, Manual Barkan Memorial Award (1988) for best scholarly contribution to the field of art education
- National Art Education Association, Researcher of the Year Award
- Award of Distinction from The Folk Art Society of America for excellence as a “Teacher, Scholar, Author, and Proponent of Florida Folk Art” (2016)
- June King McFee Award, granted by the Women’s Caucus of the National Art Education Association (2010)
- Appointed Guest Professor of Shandong University of Art and Design (September 2009 – August 2012)
- National Art Education Association Distinguished Fellow Recognition (2008)
- Dorothy Howard Award (Second Prize) from the Education Section of the American Folklore Society for Folkvine.org (2007)
- Dorothy Howard Award from the Education Section of the American Folklore Society for Uncle Monday and Other Florida Tales (2002)
- Florida Historical Library Foundation Carolyn Washbon Book Award for Uncle Monday and Other Florida Tales (2002)
- National Ziegfeld Award, granted by the United States Society for Education through Art for significant contributions to the international field of Art Education (1998)
- Elected to the Council for Policy Studies in Art Education (1998)
- Southeastern Region National Art Education Association Higher Education Division Art Educator of the Year Award (1994)
- Award of Appreciation for Dedication and Efforts as a Member of the Program Planning Committee for the 5th Annual Zora Neal Hurston Festival of the Arts and Humanities: An International Celebration (1994)
- Mary J. Rouse Award for outstanding teaching, leadership, and scholarship in the field of Art Education, granted by the National Art Education Association’s Women’s Caucus (1989)

== Other Significant Teaching Experiences ==
- United States Department Arts Envoy to Saudi Arabia (November–December 2013)
- Professor, University of Alaska-Southeast, class on Community-Based Art Education (Fall 2008)
- Florida Humanities Council, Roads Scholar (2008-2012)
- Orlando Sentinel Correspondent as Art Review Writer (1988-2000)
- Getty Planner and Instructor at Kutztown University (July 1995 and August 1996)
- Education Coordinator at Booth Residential Treatment Center (1978-1979)
- Art Teacher in the Milwaukee County Jail and Franklin House of Corrections as a member of the
- Citizen and Offender Programs in Education (1975-1978)
- Art Instructor, Milwaukee Art Center (1975-1977)
- Art Teacher, K-6 in Fort Wayne, Indiana, Public Schools (1972-1974)
