= Old Gold & Black =

Student-run newspaper of Wake Forest University

- Type: Biweekly student newspaper
- Format: Tabloid
- School: Wake Forest University
- Publisher: Triangle Publishing
- Editor: Mattie Stillerman
- Founded: 1916
- Language: English
- Headquarters: Benson University Center
- Circulation: 1,750
- Website: wfuogb.com

The Old Gold & Black (sometimes abbreviated to OGB) is the student-run newspaper of Wake Forest University, named after the school's colors. The newspaper was founded in 1916 and is published in print every other Thursday, with the exception of school holidays and exam weeks. The Old Gold & Black's office is located on the fifth floor of the Benson University Center on Wake Forest's main campus.

The Old Gold & Black is a newspaper that has placed many times at Associated Collegiate Press conferences.

== Recent awards ==
The Old Gold & Black has received a number of Associated Collegiate Press awards:

- In 1963, the Old Gold & Black received the American Newspaper Publishers Association "peacemaker" award, the highest national honors in the field of journalism.
- In 2001, Old Gold & Black reporters Sabrina Parker and Jordan Wagner received first place in the "Story of the Year: Diversity" category.
- At the 2002 ACP Conference, the newspaper received third place in the "Best in Show: Four-year college" category.
- At the 2005 ACP awards, the Old Gold & Black received third place in the "Best in Show: 4-year colleges-weekly broadsheet" category.
- In 2006, the Old Gold & Black took home third place in the "Newspaper of the Year: 4-year colleges-Weekly Broadsheet" category.
- At the 2007 ACP conference, the Old Gold & Black was awarded second place in the "Best in Show: 4-year college weekly broadsheet" category.
- At the 2008 ACP conference, the Old Gold & Black was awarded third place in the "Best in Show: 4-year college weekly broadsheet" category. Also, the newspaper's web site,, was awarded 10th place in the category of newspaper website.
- At the Spring 2011 ACP conference, the Old Gold & Black was awarded seventh place in the category of "small college website".
- At the Fall 2012 ACP conference, the Old Gold & Black was awarded fourth place in the category of "Website Enrollment Level 1".
- At the Fall 2013 ACP conference, the Old Gold & Black won a Pacemaker Award in the category of "Website Enrollment Level 1" and was a finalist for the Pacemaker Award for print. The OGB also won a Best in Show Award for "Website Enrollment Level 1" at the Fall 2013 ACP conference.

The Old Gold & Black has won the ACP's "preeminent" Pacemaker award twice: in 2001, and in 2004, its Online Pacemaker Award.

Former managing editor Lisa Hoppenjans and former managing editor Jae Haley have both received the Jim Murray Scholarship Award, a national award for excellence in sports writing at the college level.

Former editorial cartoonist William Warren was the first-place winner of the 2006 John Locher Memorial Award.

== Marks on Wake Forest history ==
The Old Gold & Black is responsible for naming the Wake Forest mascot, the Demon Deacon. In 1923, the Wake Forest American football team defeated rival Duke University. In the following issue of the Old Gold and Black, sports editor Mayon Parker (1924 Wake Forest graduate) first referred to the team as "Demon Deacons", in recognition of what he called their "devilish" play and fighting spirit. Henry Belk, Wake Forest's news director, and Hank Garrity, the coach who led the team to their victory, liked the title and used it often, so the name stuck.

Due to pressure from the Baptist State Convention in the late 1930s, the college began to take a strong stance against student dancing. The decision and subsequent enforcement was harshly criticized by the editorial board of the Old Gold & Black. In the February 4, 1939 issue, the editorial board argued that "Despite the objection of some few blue-nosed and narrow-minded powers-that-be, you can't stop Wake Forest students from dancing. It would work wonders for the morale of the school as a whole." This lobbying on behalf of social organizations is credited with the eventual founding of national fraternities and sororities at Wake Forest.

== Controversies ==
In October 1962, the High Point Central Baptist Association censured the Old Gold & Black for running an advertisement featuring a student mixing an alcoholic beverage in his dorm room. The controversy of the advertisement was part of ongoing tensions between university leadership and the Baptist State Convention. In response to the censure, university officials promised to Baptist board members that the ads would not reappear.

In December 1989, Tim Bell, a Wake Forest student studying abroad in China, was found guilty by the Honor Council of deceiving his professors who were chaperoning the trip. Bell had secretly filmed parts of the Tiananmen Square massacre and then smuggled them out of the country. Public opinion on campus was mixed following the conviction; some felt he acted heroically while others thought he was selfish for endangering the rest of the students on the trip. Nevertheless, in an editorial the Old Gold & Black defended Bell's actions and criticized the Honor Council for procedural errors. Eventually, Bell's conviction was overturned.

In March 2000, the Old Gold & Black published an anti-Semitic advertising insert entitled "The Revisionist." The Editorial Staff realized its error later that day, and issued a public apology. The Resident Student Association sponsored a forum where the issue was discussed. President Thomas Hearn issued a powerful public statement uniting the campus community against the hatred represented in the insert and creating a schedule of Holocaust-related speakers and events for the following semesters. Furthermore, the advertising manager wrote an op-ed piece regretting her mistake and taking full responsibility. She announced that the proceeds of the advertisement would be donated to a local Holocaust Center. As a result of the insert, a formal advertising policy was established and goals were set to improve communication between the editorial and business offices.

== Executive Staff ==
The five people most responsible for the day-to-day operations of the paper are the Editor-in-Chief, the Deputy Editor, the Managing Editor, and the Multimedia Director. The outgoing editor-in-chief also selects the following year's editorial board with the input of the other executive editors. The current executive staff includes Mattie Stillerman, Miriam Fabrycky, Maria Silveira, and Piper Saunders.

There were two editors in the 1989 school year because editor Jonathan Jordan ran for a seat in the 39th District of the North Carolina House of Representatives. He would lose the race and resign his position to catch up on his school work. Alan Pringle would take his post.

== Notable alumni ==
- L.T. Stallings '16, playwright and screenwriter, worked on the Old Gold & Black when it was a literary magazine.
- W. J. Cash '22, author of The Mind of the South, served as editor of the Old Gold & Black while an undergraduate at Wake Forest.
- Edwin Wilson '23, former professor, provost and vice president of Wake Forest, wrote for the Old Gold & Black his senior year at Wake Forest.
- Graham Martin Jr. '32, U.S. Ambassador to Thailand, Italy and South Vietnam, was a managing editor of the Old Gold & Black as a student.
- Shearon Davis '35, prominent businessman, former chairman of the North Carolina Chamber of Commerce, and namesake for the Shearon Harris Nuclear Power Plant was a managing editor as a student.
- David Britt '37, a Justice of the North Carolina Supreme Court, served as the business manager of the Old Gold & Black as a student.
- Jesse Helms, a U.S. Senator from 1973–2003, was a sports reporter for the Old Gold & Black before dropping out to take a job at the Raleigh Times.
- Bynum Shaw '48, author and former reporter for the Baltimore Sun, worked as the editor of the Old Gold & Black as a student at Wake Forest.
- Al Hunt '65, former writer for the Wall Street Journal and current Washington managing editor for Bloomberg News, was an Old Gold & Black staff member.
- Linda Carter Brinson '69, journalist and first woman assistant national editor at The Baltimore Sun, served as editor of the Old Gold & Black while an undergraduate student.
- Maria Henson '82, who won the 1992 Pulitzer Prize for Editorial Writing, served as a copy editor of the Old Gold & Black as an undergraduate.
- Louise Flanagan '84, a U.S. District Judge, was a section editor of the Old Gold & Black as a student.
- Tom Ondrof '86, the current CFO of Aramark, served as a sports editor of the Old Gold & Black while studying at Wake Forest.
- Jonathan Jordan '90, an attorney and politician who served in the North Carolina House of Representatives, was editor-in-chief of the Old Gold & Black.
- Britt Grant '00, a U.S. Circuit Court Judge, wrote for the Old Gold & Black as an undergraduate.
- Ricky Van Veen '03, co-founder of the website CollegeHumor, was a photographer and reporter for the Old Gold & Black while a student.
- Zachary Klein '04, co-founder of Vimeo, was one of the first Online Managing Editors of the Old Gold & Black.
- Jordan Rae Kelly '05, the former director for cyber incident response on the National Security Council at the White House, wrote for the Old Gold & Black as an undergraduate.
