= Peter Narváez =

Canadian writer and folklorist (1942–2011)

Peter Narváez (born Peter Reuben Aceves; March 16, 1942 – November 11, 2011) was a Canadian writer, scholar, folklorist, and musician known for his contributions to the study of folklore, ethnomusicology, blues, popular culture and Canadian culture.

== Early life and education ==
Born in Brooklyn, New York, Narváez earned a BA in History from Drew University (Madison, New Jersey), an MA and a PhD in folklore from Indiana University (Bloomington, Indiana). He began his academic career as a professor of History and Anthropology at Bliss College in Lewiston, Maine in 1969. In 1974 he joined the faculty of Memorial University of Newfoundland, teaching as a professor in the folklore department and working as an archivist in the MUN Folklore and Language Archive (MUNFLA).

== Career ==
Narváez was widely recognized as a leading expert in the field of folklore, ethnomusicology, and popular culture with a particular focus on Canadian culture and blues. He conducted extensive fieldwork throughout the American south, Puerto Rico, and Newfoundland and Labrador, documenting and preserving oral traditions, history and music. His research interests also included the study of immigrant cultures in Canada, African American music, and the cultural impact of technology.

In addition to his academic work, Narváez was also a prolific writer and musician. He also published numerous articles and essays in academic journals and popular media and produced a number of broadcast documentaries.

Narváez was also an accomplished musician, playing guitar, harmonica and mandolin. He was a member of several Newfoundland-based bands, including the Cookstown Jukes, Marty and the Marginals, Bopular Demand, Power House Blues Band and Superpickers! and was known for his performances of both acoustic and electric blues.

Throughout his career, Narváez received numerous awards and honors for his contributions to Canadian culture and academia. He was a recipient of the Marius Barbeau Medal for Lifetime Achievement from the Folklore Studies Association of Canada, and was given a Lifetime Achievement Award for Contributions to the Folk Arts in Newfoundland and Labrador by the St. John’s Folk Arts Society.

== Discography ==
- “So Wild”/”Bye and Bye” Pete & Jimmy and the Rhythm Knights, Castle (1959)
- Homegas (1971)
- Your Blues Ain't Sweet Like Mine (1978)
- Rock´N´Roll Ruby (1984)
- Some Good Blues (2002, 2009)
- Superpickers! Blues on the Ceiling (2011)

== Books ==
- Media Sense: The Folklore-Popular Culture Continuum, with Martin Laba (1986)
- The Good People: New Fairylore Essays (1997)
- Of Corpse: Death and Humor in Folklore and Popular Culture (2003)
- Bean Blossom to Bannerman, Odyssey of a Folklorist: A Festschrift for Neil V. Rosenberg, with Martin Lovelace and Diane Tye (2005
- Sonny's Dream: Newfoundland Folklore and Popular Culture (2012)
