= Sardis Primitive Baptist Church =

Church in Madison, North Carolina

- Sardis Church in 2026

Religion
- Affiliation: Primitive Baptist
- District: Salem Association
- Status: Active

Location
- Location: 2013 Sardis Church Road; Madison, North Carolina; United States
- Interactive map of Sardis Primitive Baptist Church
- Coordinates: 36°19′56.7″N 79°56′51.5″W

Sardis Primitive Baptist Church and Cemetery is a historic Primitive Baptist church and cemetery in Madison, North Carolina. Founded in 1801, it is one of the oldest church congregations in Rockingham County.

== History ==
Sardis Church was organized on March 25, 1801. The first church building was constructed in 1806 on a plot of land near the town of Madison, donated by Zachariah Wall. The second church building, a log school house, was in the Ellisboro community on the south side of the Dan River. The congregation constructed a third building in 1900; a plain, one-room wooden building on the site of the current church. The fourth and current building was built in 1913 and is made of brick.

The church follows the Primitive Baptist tradition and was a member of the Mayo Association until 1909, when the Salem Association was formed. It is one of the oldest churches in Rockingham County.

== Notable burials ==
- Benny Carter, American painter and sculptor
- J. P. Carter, American politician and military officer
