= Rockingham County Courthouse (North Carolina) =

Historic courthouse in North Carolina, US

- U.S. National Register of Historic Places
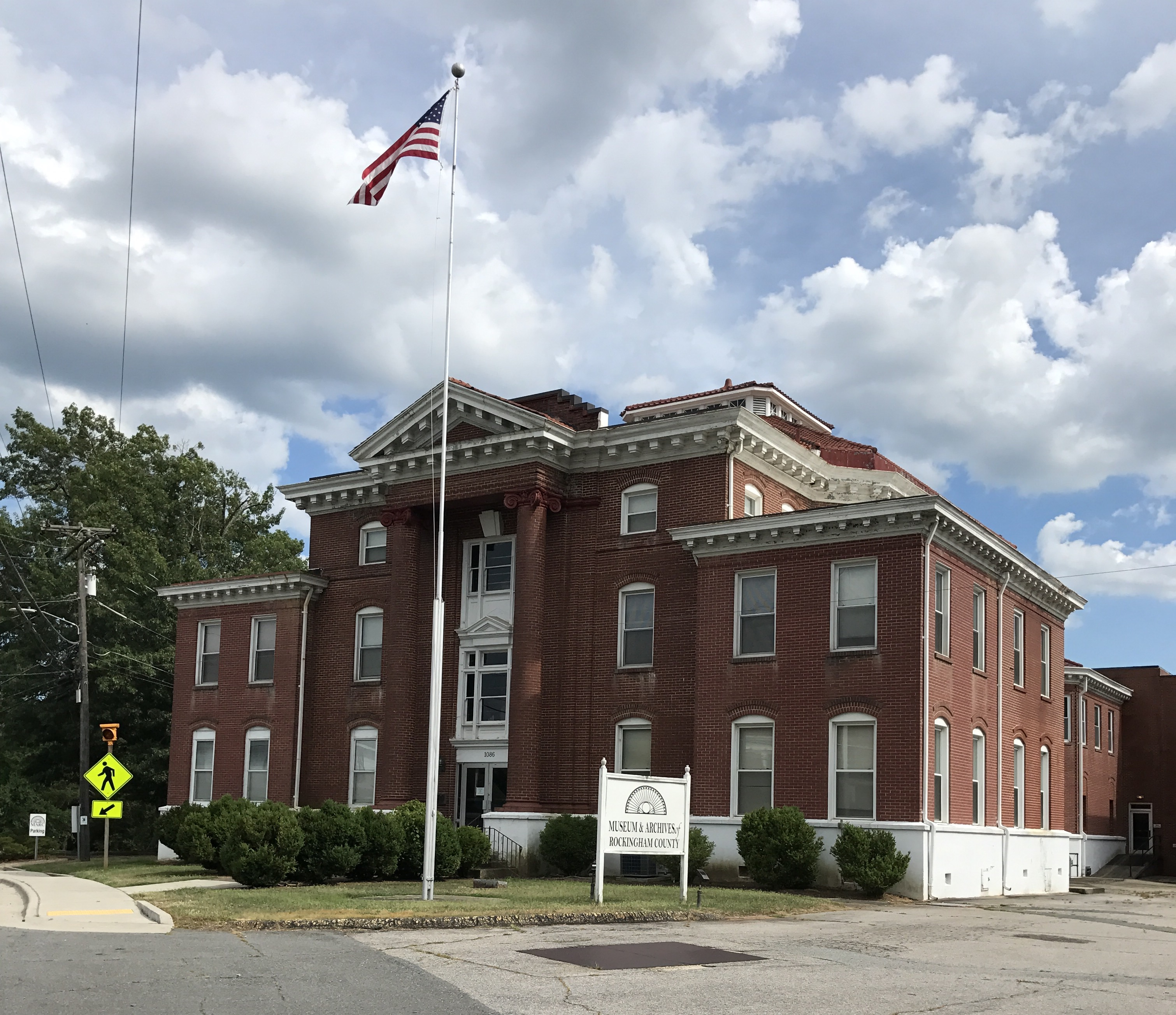
- Rockingham County Courthouse in 2019

- Location within North Carolina Location within the United States
- Location: Highway 65, Wentworth, North Carolina
- Coordinates: 36.3982°N 79.7708°W
- Area: less than one acre
- Built: 1907-1908
- Built by: Smith, B.F.
- Architect: Frank Pierce Milburn
- Architectural style: Classical Revival
- MPS: North Carolina County Courthouses TR
- NRHP reference No.: 79001748
- Added to NRHP: May 10, 1979

The Rockingham County Courthouse is a historic courthouse located at Wentworth, Rockingham County, North Carolina. It was designed by Frank P. Milburn and built in 1907. It is a Classical Revival-style red brick building that consists of a three-story hipped roofed main block flanked by later added (at two separate times) two-story flat roofed wings. It features a low and broad polygonal cupola atop the Spanish red tile roof. The 1907 courthouse, listed on the National Register of Historic Places in 1979, now houses the Museum and Archives of Rockingham County.

== History ==
=== Background ===
Originally, the first session of the Rockingham County Court met at Eagle Falls on the Dan River in 1786. In 1787 a courthouse was established near the center of the county and the settlement was known as Rockingham Courthouse. However, in 1798, the General Assembly of North Carolina passed an act which established the county seat to be known as Wentworth at the site of the 1787 Courthouse. This courthouse was replaced by a brick courthouse in 1824 and this building was considerably remodeled (plans by non-professional architect Lyndon Swaim of Greensboro, NC) in a more Victorian style in the early 1880s.

On the night of October 2, 1906, a mercantile building in the courthouse village square caught fire. The fire spread to the courthouse and destroyed it. All of its records were recovered except for a few old documents displayed in the gallery—likely tax lists. The destruction of the courthouse occurred during a years-long dispute between the citizens of Reidsville, who wanted to move the county seat to their city, and residents from other areas of the county, who were opposed to its relocation. The debate continued for several months until the county commission voted to rebuild the courthouse in Wentworth.

=== Construction and additions ===
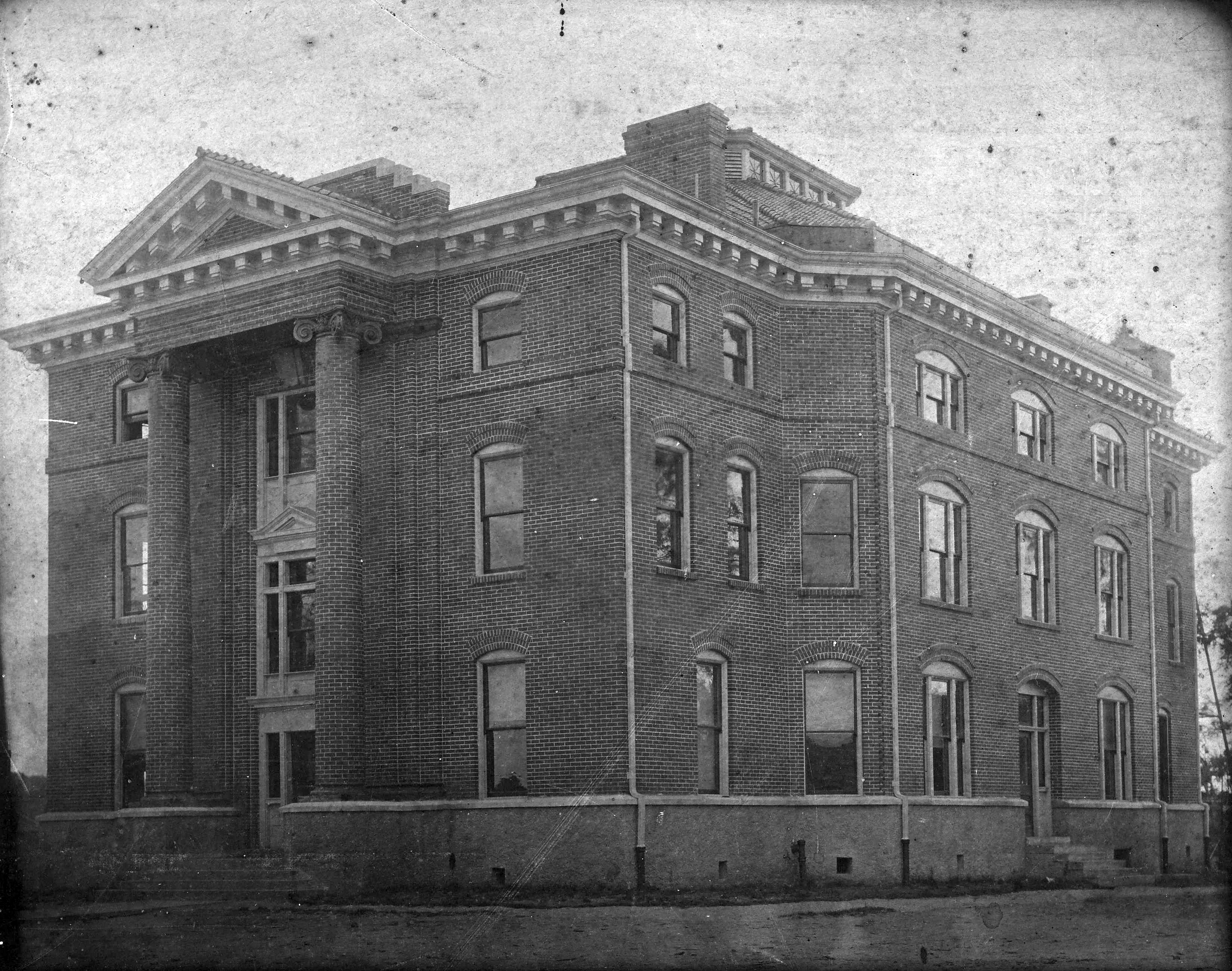
The courthouse in 1907

In early 1907 Rockingham County hired Frank Pierce Milburn to design the new courthouse. His plans included a new water and sewage system which was also implemented in the nearby jail. The courthouse's foundation was laid by June. By September the main structure was complete, and by February 1908 the interior was finished. In 1937 additions were added to either side of the building using the same architectural style. In 1970 a large brick annex was erected on the rear of the building to house an additional courtroom and offices for the clerk of superior court and register of deeds. Shortly thereafter a "Law and Order Building" was appended onto the courthouse to host the offices of the Rockingham County Sheriff's Department and a new jail.

=== Replacement ===
In May 2011, a new 184,516 square foot Rockingham County courthouse, also known as the "Rockingham County Justice Center," opened its doors at a location one mile east of the historic village area where the courthouses had been since 1787. Construction of the new building cost $39,059,000, after an originally projected cost of $37,757,000. The three-story Justice Center houses county law enforcement services as well as the county courthouse.
