= Wentworth, North Carolina =

Town in Rockingham County

- Town
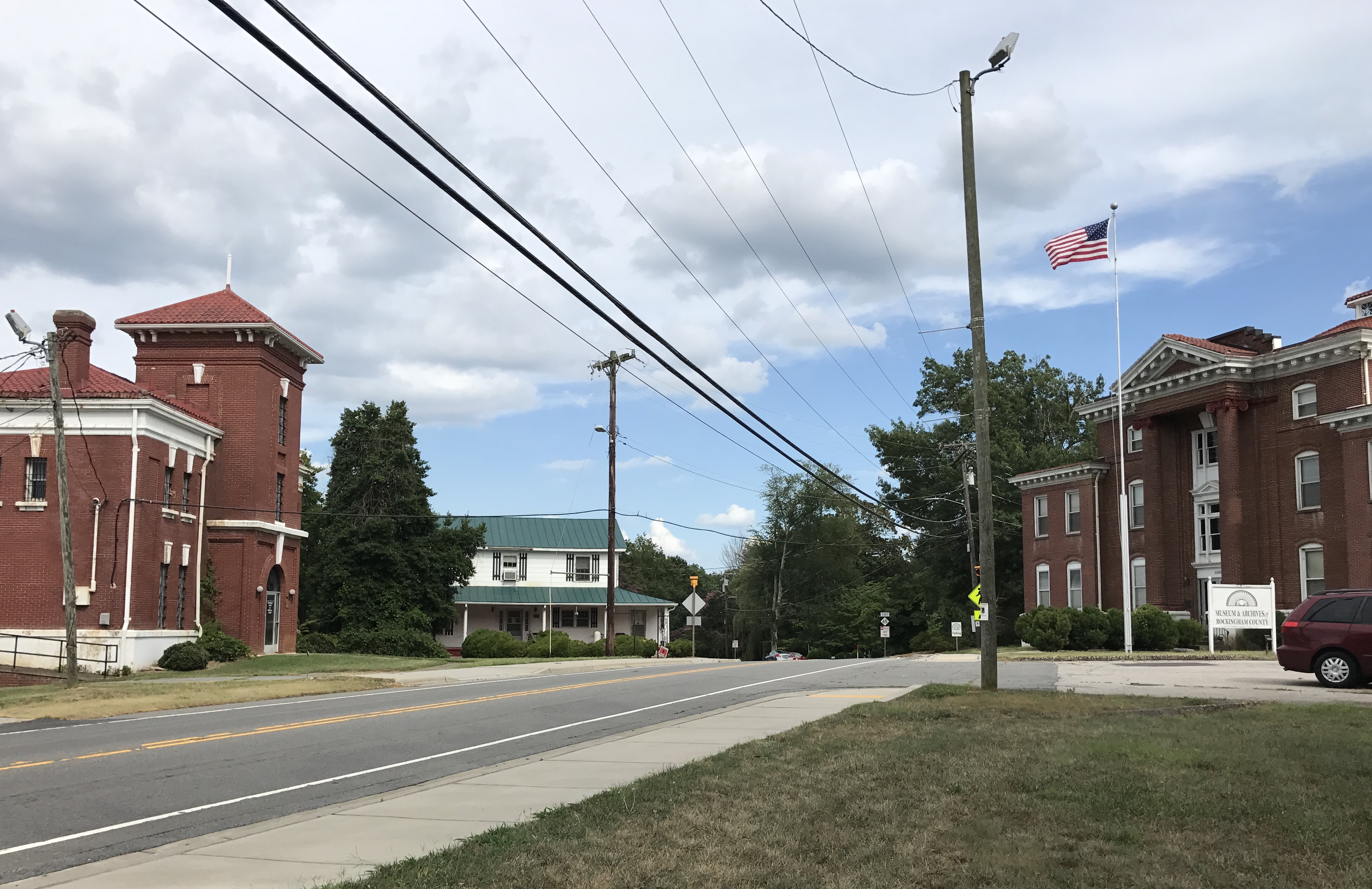
- Center of Wentworth, with the former jail at left and the former county courthouse at right

- Seal

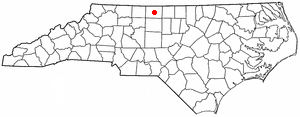
- Location of Wentworth, North Carolina
- Coordinates: 36°23′29″N 79°45′04″W
- Country: United States
- State: North Carolina
- County: Rockingham
- Named for: Charles Watson-Wentworth, 2nd Marquess of Rockingham

Area
  - Total: 14.26 sq mi (36.93 km^{2})
  - Land: 14.19 sq mi (36.76 km^{2})
  - Water: 0.066 sq mi (0.17 km^{2})
- Elevation: 883 ft (269 m)

Population (2020)
  - Total: 2,662
  - Density: 187.6/sq mi (72.42/km^{2})
- Time zone: UTC-5 (Eastern (EST))
  - Summer (DST): UTC-4 (EDT)
- ZIP code: 27375
- Area code: 336
- FIPS code: 37-71900
- GNIS feature ID: 2406858
- Website: www.townofwentworth.com

Wentworth is a town in and the county seat of Rockingham County, North Carolina, United States. The population was 2,646 at the 2020 census. Wentworth is part of the Greensboro-High Point metropolitan area of the Piedmont Triad.

== History ==
Wentworth was established as "Rockingham Courthouse" in 1787 making it the oldest settlement in Rockingham County. The post office there was established in November 1794. The settlement was chartered as Wentworth in 1798. Both Wentworth and Rockingham County were named in homage to the same individual; the Marquis of Rockingham, Charles Watson-Wentworth. Watson-Wentworth served two terms as the prime minister of the United Kingdom and greatly advocated for colonial independence.

Almost two hundred years later, in the 1990s, the Wentworth community was facing the possibility of much of its area being annexed into neighboring Reidsville which had repeatedly but unsuccessfully tried to take the county seat for over a century. County officials, none of whom lived in Wentworth, declined to oppose this possible annexation. Nevertheless, the local community banded together with an initiative which stopped this impending annexation. In 1998, with approval from the state General Assembly, the town of Wentworth amended the lapse within their original 1798 charter and remained as its own municipality. Until its reactivation (which included an area considerably larger than the original courthouse village of approximately one hundred people) Wentworth was the smallest county seat in the state.

The Dead Timber Ford Sluices, Eagle Falls Sluice, Rockingham County Courthouse, Wentworth Methodist Episcopal Church and Cemetery, and Wright Tavern are listed on the National Register of Historic Places.

== Geography ==
The town has a total area of 14.4 square miles (37 km), of which, 14.3 square miles (37 km^{2}) is land and 0.49% or 0.1 square miles (0.26 km^{2}) is water.

== Demographics ==
Historical population
Census	Pop.	Note	%±
2000	2,779		—
2010	2,807		1.0%
2020	2,662		−5.2%
2021 (est.)	2,657	▼	−0.2%
U.S. Decennial Census

=== 2020 census ===
As of the 2020 census, Wentworth had a population of 2,662. The median age was 44.3 years. 19.0% of residents were under the age of 18 and 18.7% of residents were 65 years of age or older. For every 100 females there were 111.3 males, and for every 100 females age 18 and over there were 111.7 males age 18 and over.

1.0% of residents lived in urban areas, while 99.0% lived in rural areas.

There were 1,009 households in Wentworth, including 691 families, of which 30.3% had children under the age of 18 living in them. Of all households, 56.7% were married-couple households, 17.5% were households with a male householder and no spouse or partner present, and 20.3% were households with a female householder and no spouse or partner present. About 24.0% of all households were made up of individuals and 10.7% had someone living alone who was 65 years of age or older.

There were 1,113 housing units, of which 9.3% were vacant. The homeowner vacancy rate was 1.7% and the rental vacancy rate was 11.0%.

Wentworth racial composition
Race	Number	Percentage
White (non-Hispanic)	2,113	79.38%
Black or African American (non-Hispanic)	317	11.91%
Native American	9	0.34%
Asian	14	0.53%
Other/mixed-race	84	3.16%
Hispanic or Latino	125	4.7%

=== 2010 census ===
As of the 2010 U.S. Census, there were 2,807 people and 784 families residing in the town. The population density was 194.3 people per square mile (75.0 people/km^{2}). The racial makeup of the town was 80.89% Caucasian, 16.91% African American, 0.40% Native American, 0.32% Asian, 0.68% from other races, and 0.79% from two or more races. Hispanic or Latino people of any race were 1.33% of the population.

There were 1,018 households, out of which 35.7% had children under the age of 18 living with them, 62.4% were married couples living together, 9.9% had a female householder with no husband present, and 22.9% were non-families. 19.5% of all households consisted of a single individual. The average household size was 2.60 and the average family size was 2.98.

In the town, the population was spread out, with 24.0% under the age of 18, 7.8% from 18 to 24, 32.0% from 25 to 44, 25.0% from 45 to 64, and 11.3% who were 65 years of age or older. The median age was 38 years. For every 100 females, there were 106.2 males.

The median income for a household in the town was $39,083, and the median income for a family was $45,865. Males had a median income of $31,515 versus $23,116 for females. The per capita income for the town was $18,071. About 3.9% of families and 4.5% of the population were below the poverty line, including 1.1% of those under age 18 and 9.9% of those age 65 or over.

== Arts and culture ==
Carter Family Plantation in Wentworth

The Rockingham County Courthouse in Wentworth is listed on the National Register of Historic Places, and houses the Museum and Archives of Rockingham County.

== Government ==
One of the most widely used forms of government by small cities in North Carolina, Wentworth is governed under the mayor-council form of government. The Wentworth Town Council has five members, from which one is elected mayor and one is elected mayor pro tem. Council members are elected in nonpartisan elections and serve four year terms.

== Education ==
Public schools include:

- Wentworth Elementary
- Rockingham County Middle School
- Rockingham County High School
- Rockingham Community College

== Notable people ==
- Robert P. Dick (1823–1898), lawyer and judge, served as justice of the United States District Court for the Western District of North Carolina
- Christopher Knight (born c. 1973), blogger and filmmaker
- Dalton L. McMichael (1914–2001), textile executive and philanthropist
- John Motley Morehead (1796–1866), lawyer and politician, served as Governor of North Carolina
- David Settle Reid (1813–1891), politician, served as governor of North Carolina
- James W. Reid (1849–1902), politician, served as a U.S. Congressman
- Thomas Settle (1789–1857), politician, served as a U.S. congressman
- Thomas Settle (1865–1919), politician, served as a U.S. congressman
- John W. Stephens (1834–1870), politician, served in the North Carolina Senate
