= Reidsville Historic District =

Historic district in North Carolina, United States

- U.S. National Register of Historic Places
- U.S. Historic district
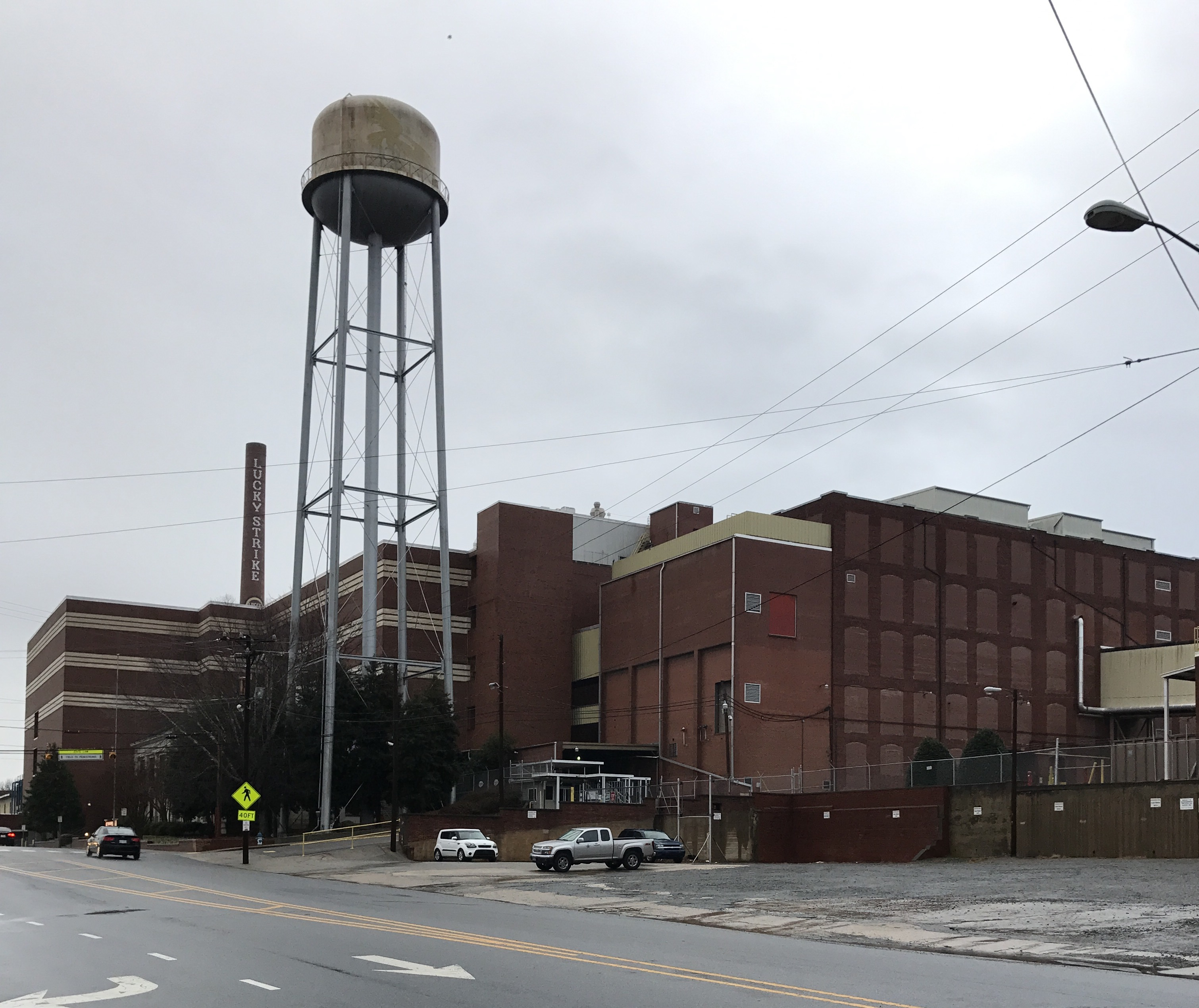
- American Tobacco Company factory

- Location within North Carolina Location within the United States
- Location: Roughly bounded by W. Morehead, Southern Railway tracks, Lawson Ave., Main, Piedmontg, Vance and Lindsey Sts., Reidsville, North Carolina
- Coordinates: 36°21′23″N 79°40′00″W
- Area: 140 acres (57 ha)
- Built: c. 1865
- Architect: Gambier, Richard; Et al.
- Architectural style: Italianate, Queen Anne, Craftsman;Neo-Classical
- MPS: Reidsville MRA
- NRHP reference No.: 86003391
- Added to NRHP: March 12, 1987

Reidsville Historic District is a national historic district located at Reidsville, Rockingham County, North Carolina. It encompasses 324 contributing buildings, 1 contributing site, 11 contributing structures, and 1 contributing object in the central business district and surrounding residential sections of Reidsville. It was developed between about 1865 and 1941, and includes notable examples of Italianate, Queen Anne, American Craftsman, and Classical Revival style architecture. Located in the district are the separately listed Penn House and Gov. David S. Reid House. Other notable buildings include the Oaks-Motley House (c. 1865), Colonel A. J. Boyd House (mid-1870s), Reid Block (1880s), Citizens' Bank Building, William Lindsey and company Tobacco Factory, First Baptist Church, Main Street Methodist Church, Melrose (1909) designed by architect Richard Gambier, R. L. Watt house designed by Willard C. Northup, First Presbyterian Church (1922), St. Thomas Episcopal Church, Grand Theatre, Belvedere Hotel, United States Post Office and Federal Building, and the Municipal Building (1926).

It was listed on the National Register of Historic Places in 1987.
