= Downtown North Historic District =

Downtown North Historic District may refer to:

- Bridgeport Downtown North Historic District, Bridgeport, Connecticut, listed on the National Register of Historic Places (NRHP)
- Downtown North Historic District (Hartford, Connecticut), NRHP-listed
- Downtown North Historic District (Winston-Salem, North Carolina), NRHP-listed in Forsyth County
