= Willard C. Northup =

American architect (1882–1942)

Willard Close Northup (1882–1942) was an American architect in North Carolina who was the principal partner in the firm Northup & O'Brien. His firm was based in Winston-Salem, North Carolina. Northup began his architectural practice in 1906 and partnered with Leet Alexander O'Brien (1891–1963) in 1915 or 1916. Luther Lashmit joined the firm in 1927, and was lead architect for Graylyn while an employee of the firm.

Northrup & O'Brien was a firm that lasted from 1916 to 1953. It included partners Willard Close Northrup and Leet Alexander O'Brien and Luther Lashmit. It was based in Winston-Salem, North Carolina.

Either alone or with O'Brien, Northup designed many of the prominent buildings of the period in Winston-Salem and elsewhere in North Carolina, along with over one hundred schools in the state.

A number of his works and the works of Northup & O'Brien are listed on the U.S. National Register of Historic Places (NRHP).

Works include (with attribution):

- Cicero Francis Lowe House (1911), 204 Cascade Ave. Winston-Salem, North Carolina (Northup, Willard C.), NRHP-listed
- Salem Town Hall (1912), 301 S. Liberty St. Winston-Salem, North Carolina (Northup, Willard C.), NRHP-listed
- Marion House (1913 remodelling), 7034 Siloam Rd., Siloam, North Carolina (Northup, Willard C.), NRHP-listed
- O'Hanlon Building (1915), 103 W. 4th St. Winston-Salem, North Carolina (Northup, Willard C.), NRHP-listed
- Agnew Hunter Bahnson House (1920), Jct. of W. Fifth and Spring Sts. Winston-Salem, North Carolina (Northup, Willard C.), NRHP-listed
- Reidsville High School, Former (1923), 116 N. Franklin St. Reidsville, North Carolina (Northup, Willard C.), NRHP-listed
- Winston-Salem City Hall (1926), 101 S. Main St. Winston-Salem, North Carolina (Northup and O'Brien), NRHP-listed
- Pepper Building (1928), 100–106 W. 4th St. Winston-Salem, North Carolina (Northup and O'Brien), NRHP-listed
- Rock House (1929), 7 Chestnut Ln., Roaring Gap, North Carolina (Northrup and O'Brien), NRHP-listed
- Snow Building (1930), 355 W Main St., Durham, North Carolina (Northrup and O'Brien)
- Indera Mills (1904–1916), 400 S. Marshall St. Winston-Salem, North Carolina (Northup and O'Brien), NRHP-listed
- One or more works in Ardmore Historic District, roughly bounded by Knollwood, Queen, Duke, and Ardsley Sts., Winston-Salem, North Carolina (Northup & O'Brien), NRHP-listed
- One or more works in Downtown North Historic District, roughly bounded by W. Fifth, W. Eighth, N. Main and N. Cherry Sts. Winston-Salem, North Carolina (Northup and O'Brien), NRHP-listed
- One or more works in Second Street Historic District, portions of 100 and 200 blocks N. Second St. and 100 blk West North St. Albemarle, North Carolina (Northup and O'Brien), NRHP-listed
