= The Fultz sisters =

American quadruplets

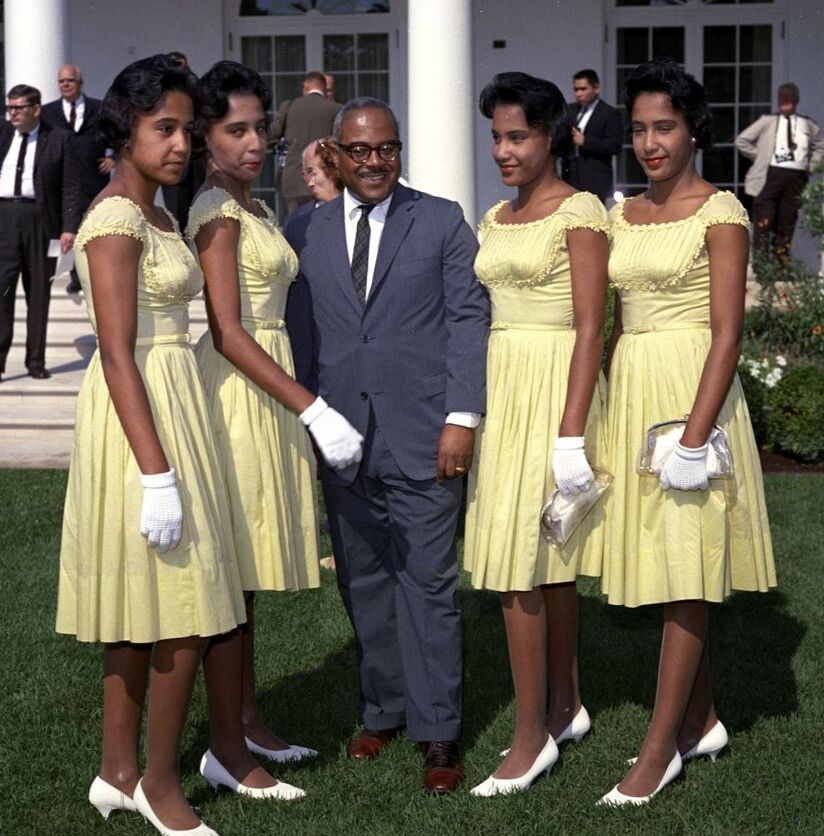
- The Fultz sisters with Andrew Hatcher, 1962
- Born: May 23, 1946; Reidsville, North Carolina
- Died: Mary Louise Fultz Teague 1991 (aged 45); Mary Ann Fultz Bostic 1995 (aged 49); Mary Alice Fultz; 2001 (aged 55); Mary Catherine Fultz Griffin; 2018 (aged 72)
- Other name: Fultz Quads

The Fultz sisters (born May 23, 1946) were a set of American quadruplets who became famous as the first identical African American quadruplets on record. They made promotional appearances for Pet Milk in a deal that provided their family land, a house, and a full-time nurse. The sisters were later adopted by the nurse. Throughout their childhood, they received attention in the media, where they were also termed the Fultz quads.

== Birth ==
The Fultz sisters were born on May 23, 1946, in Reidsville, North Carolina, in the segregated basement wing of Annie Penn Hospital. They were born prematurely, at about 3.5 pounds (1.6 kg) each. Fred Klenner, a white doctor who had served the family for years prior, had expected triplets due to a previous x-ray scan showing three infants. Klenner delivered the sisters, assisted by a Black nurse named Margaret Ware. There was no incubator, so the infants were laid next to one another for warmth, with cotton gauze blankets and "an old, used single-unit hot plate and an equally old 10-quart kettle," as Klenner later described.

The sisters' parents were tobacco sharecroppers James "Pete" Fultz Jr. (born April 15, 1893, in Madison) and Annie Mae Troxler Fultz (born May 14, 1909, in Rockingham County). Annie Mae, who was African American and Cherokee, had been deaf and mute since contracting meningitis as a child. Annie Mae could not read or write. The sisters had six older siblings: four brothers and two sisters. Pete had two brothers with multiple births; one had one set of twins, and the other had three sets of twins, and each had 15 children.

When they were born, Annie Mae considered several sets of names: Betty, Clara, Billie, and Anne; Laurinda, Belinda, Lucinda, and Magenda; and Rosetta, Loretta, Margretta, and Henrietta. The sisters were ultimately named by Klenner, who chose the name "Mary" (to honor the mother of Jesus) followed by names of women in his own family, naming the sisters Mary Louise, Mary Ann, Mary Alice, and Mary Catherine. Throughout their lives, the sisters were called by their second names.

Upon their birth, Klenner experimentally treated the sisters with high doses of injected vitamin C, believing like Linus Pauling that this treatment contributed positively to their health. Klenner, who was originally from Pennsylvania and of German American descent, was later described in local press as "either very Old South or an outright racist", according to O magazine. During World War II, he had openly been a Nazi sympathizer and defended Adolf Hitler. His office often contained white supremacist and conservative materials, such as pamphlets from the John Birch Society and the White Citizens Council and a poster for George Wallace's 1968 presidential campaign.

=== Media coverage and deal with Pet Milk ===
The Fultz sisters—also known as the "Fultz quads"—were the first identical African American quadruplets on record. While the sisters received national media coverage, they received less attention in local newspapers such as the Greensboro Daily News, where their birth was considered "colored news". As infants, the sisters were offered four-year scholarships to Bennett College in Greensboro, and as toddlers they were offered four-year scholarships to Palmer Memorial Institute in Sedalia.

Milk companies Pet, Carnation, and Borden presented deals to Klenner. Pet was selected, and Klenner was awarded a contract which was administered by his sister-in-law Susie Sharp. Pet agreed to support the sisters for the first ten years of their lives. For the Fultzes, the Pet contract provided property and a 24-hour nurse, Elma Saylor, who was also Black. The family was also provided four mules. Pet purchased 148 acres (60 ha) of farmland near Madison and a home with electricity, running water, and bathrooms. Pet bought the farm for $6,000 from Sharp's parents. The house had four rooms, and 13 or 14 people lived in it.

Pet utilized the Fultz sisters to attract Black consumers. The sponsorship of the Fultzes was also part of a broader Pet campaign of promotionally "adopting" sets of quadruplets. It was reported that the sisters were fed only Pet Milk, and that the milk contributed to their healthy growth.

== Childhood ==
The sisters finally left the hospital at five months old, with nurses continuing their vitamin treatments. Saylor and Ware were considered the sisters' caretakers, and the rest of the Fultz family was allowed to visit them without restrictions. In 1947, Annie Mae became pregnant with an eleventh child, a boy named Leonard. In 1950, the sisters met President Harry S. Truman. Shortly after their fifth birthday, Governor W. Kerr Scott praised interest in the sisters as positive for race relations.

In 1952, the Fultz sisters were legally adopted by Saylor and her husband Charles. The Saylors had previously had a child die due to polio. Pet bought a house for the Saylors in Milton, 30 miles (48 km) from the Fultz farm, and the sisters moved there. Annie Mae and Pete remained on the farm near Madison, though it was unproductive. The Fultzes and their friends and family cited hilly and infertile land, while Pet blamed Pete and said he drank too much. Also in 1952, the sisters began attending school at Caswell County Training School, an all-Black K–12 school in Yanceyville.

The Saylors continued to work with the Fultz sisters in their custody, in addition to being paid $350 per month by Pet. Elma Saylor later criticized the deal, saying in 1968: "I'm not saying that Pet didn't do everything it promised to do; I'm saying that they could have done more. They were dealing with backwoods people, and I feel that a big company like that should have foreseen all the problems that such special babies would have." Saylor was a piano player, and taught the sisters to sing; the sisters could also play several instruments. After being adopted by the Saylors, the sisters traveled more often for Pet promotions, including photo shoots and television appearances. Catherine would later say that they were frequently taken out of school for promotional activities. In 1954, at seven years old, the sisters did their first paid performance, singing and dancing at a high school in Granville County.

== Adolescence and adulthood ==
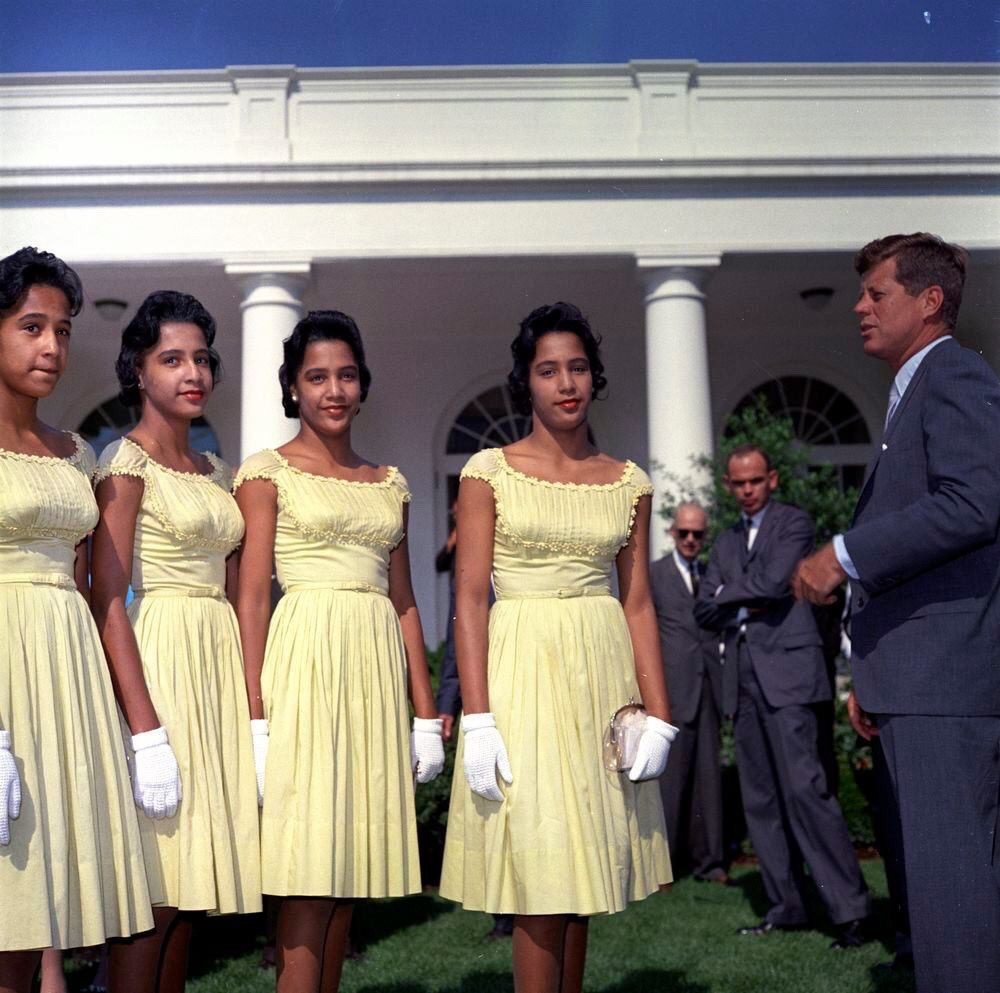
Fultz sisters with John F. Kennedy at the White House (1962)

The sisters spent the summer of 1960 on a promotional tour for Pet; on the tour they met Althea Gibson and Floyd Patterson. While they were in high school at Caswell County Training School, the sisters spent summers working at a diner in Greensboro, living in the owner's home. In 1961, when the sisters were 15 years old, Alice became pregnant. As the baby boy was born out of wedlock, Alice was made to put the child up for adoption. Decades later, Alice attempted to contact her son with little success. In August 1962, the sisters met President John F. Kennedy at the White House, sponsored by the National Association of Colored Women's Clubs.

In the summer of 1963, the sisters attended the Reading Center at Livingstone College in Salisbury. In April 1964, just before they turned 18 years old, the sisters attended a debutante ball for Zeta Phi Beta, becoming members of the sorority. Also in 1964, Sharp and Pet arranged the end of the sisters' contract with Pet. Sharp said: "Sooner or later, these people must realize that there is no golden future around the corner, that these are just four nice little girls, who must seek a way of livelihood in a normal, wholesome fashion."

In 1965, they graduated from Caswell County Training School. The sisters, as a unit, had a four-year scholarship to Bethune–Cookman University. After two years of struggling at Bethune–Cookman, the sisters were advised to withdraw from the school. Shortly after leaving Bethune–Cookman, the Saylors and the Fultz sisters moved to Peekskill, New York, in the hopes of creating a career in show business. The sisters graduated from the Barbizon School of Modeling and appeared in various ad campaigns. In 1968, at 22 years old, the sisters were living with the Saylors in a two-bedroom apartment in an integrated housing project in Peekskill. They were working in a garment factory for low wages.

They all became nurses' aides, then began living in different cities. In 1981, Alice was diagnosed with breast cancer, undergoing chemotherapy and radiation. Following Alice's diagnosis, the sisters moved to the Carolinas. Louise, who married Alfred Teague, lived in Greensboro, North Carolina. Ann married Bostic and lived in Eastover, South Carolina. Alice married, but later divorced. 1984, Alice began living in Reidsville, North Carolina, where the sisters were born. Around 1990, Catherine also moved to Reidsville. In 1995, Catherine underwent a mastectomy. Each of the sisters only gave birth to one child; Catherine said: "We were all scared to death that we would have multiple births, so we stopped at one".

== Deaths ==
Louise died April 1, 1991 (age 45); Ann died in 1996 (age 49); Alice died October 7, 2001 (age 55); and Catherine died October 2, 2018 (age 71). All four sisters had breast cancer, and Louise, Ann, and Alice died of breast cancer. Catherine died of cancer in her spine and chest. Before Catherine died, she expressed her belief that their cancer was caused by the vitamin shots administered to the sisters as children.
