= Cicero Francis Lowe House =

Historic house in North Carolina, United States

- U.S. National Register of Historic Places
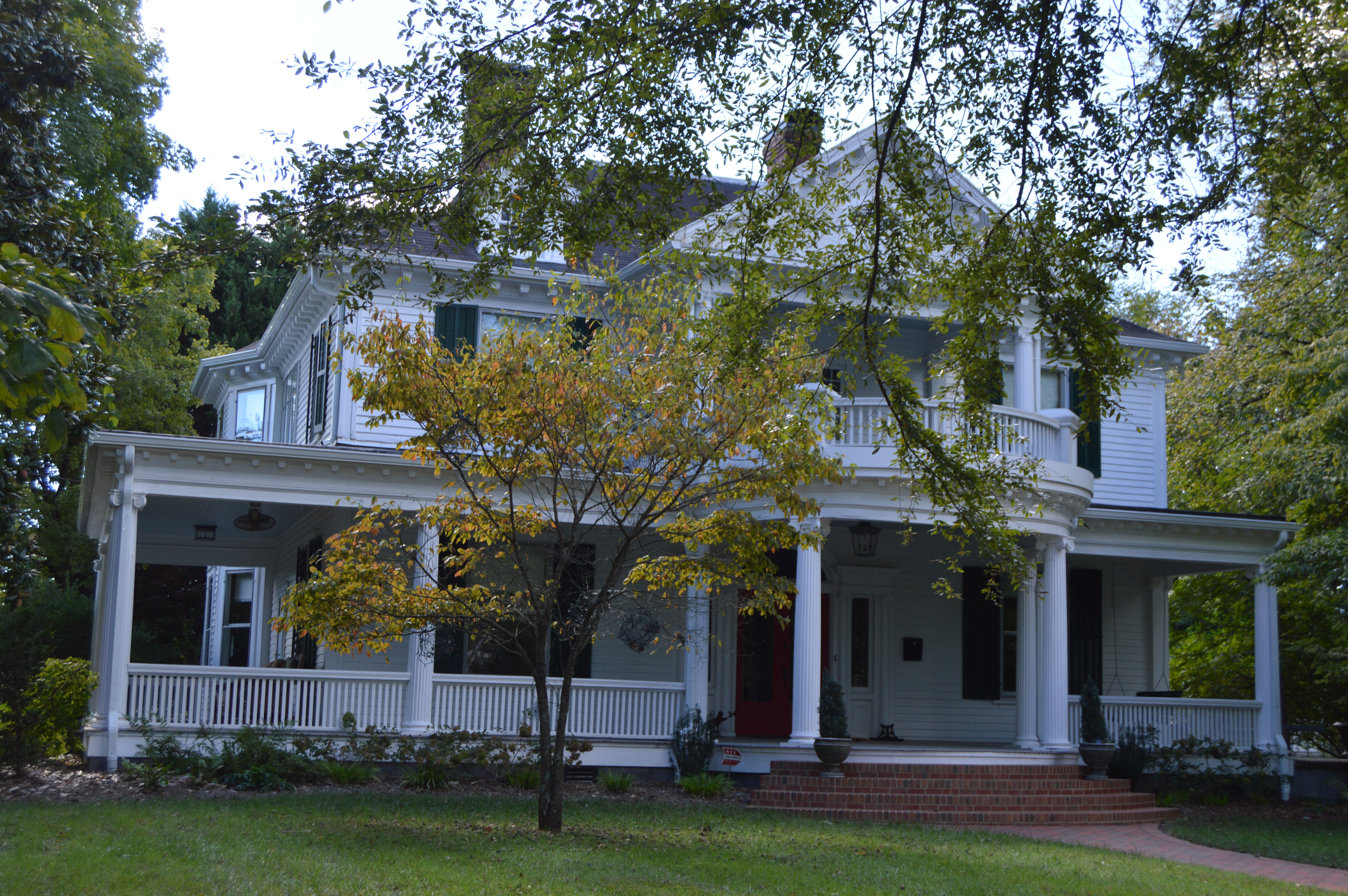
- Facade

- Location within North Carolina Location within the United States
- Location: 204 Cascade Ave., Winston-Salem, North Carolina
- Coordinates: 36°4′25″N 80°14′33″W
- Area: less than one acre
- Built: 1911; 115 years ago
- Architect: Northup, Willard C.
- Architectural style: Colonial Revival
- NRHP reference No.: 84000535
- Added to NRHP: December 20, 1984

Cicero Francis Lowe House is a historic home located in Winston-Salem, Forsyth County, North Carolina, United States. It was designed by architect Willard C. Northup and built in 1911. It is a two-story, Colonial Revival style frame dwelling. It features high chimneys with decorative caps, a high hipped roof, and a classical entrance with projecting semi-circular porch and Ionic order columns.

It was listed on the National Register of Historic Places in 1984.
