= Reuben Wallace McCollum House =

Historic house in North Carolina, United States

- U.S. National Register of Historic Places
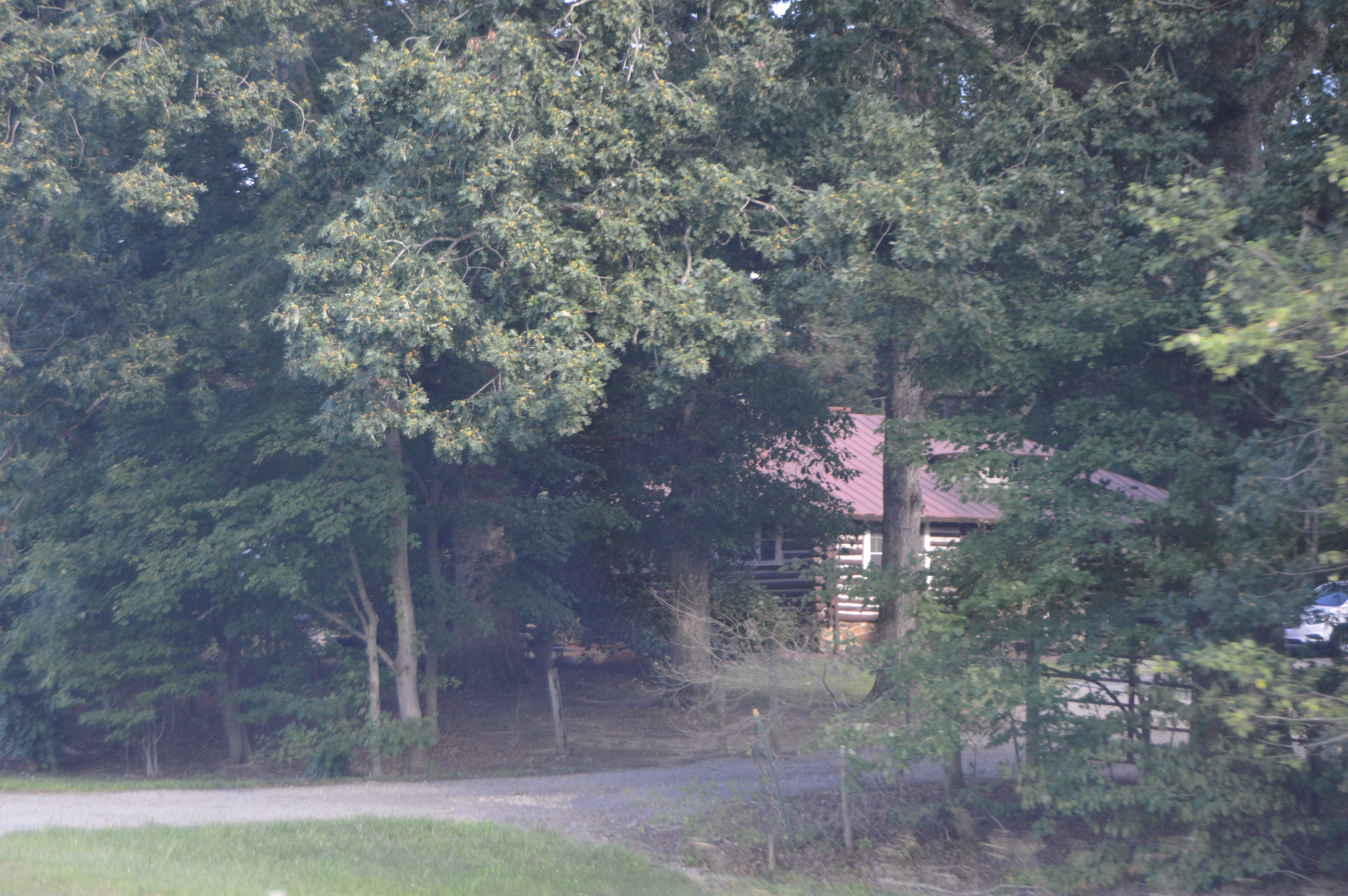
- Northern side

- Location within North Carolina Location within the United States
- Location: 2203 S. Scales St., Reidsville, North Carolina
- Coordinates: 36°18′52″N 79°40′13″W
- Area: 1.9 acres (0.77 ha)
- Built: 1928
- Built by: Reuben Wallace McCollum
- Architectural style: Log House
- NRHP reference No.: 03000341
- Added to NRHP: May 1, 2003

Reuben Wallace McCollum House is a historic home located at Reidsville, Rockingham County, North Carolina. It was completed in 1928, and is a one-story, double pile, Rustic-style log house. Also on the property is a one-story-with-loft log house dated between about 1850 and 1875 and renovated about 1921.

It was listed on the National Register of Historic Places in 2003.
