= Jennings-Baker House =

Historic house in North Carolina, United States

- U.S. National Register of Historic Places
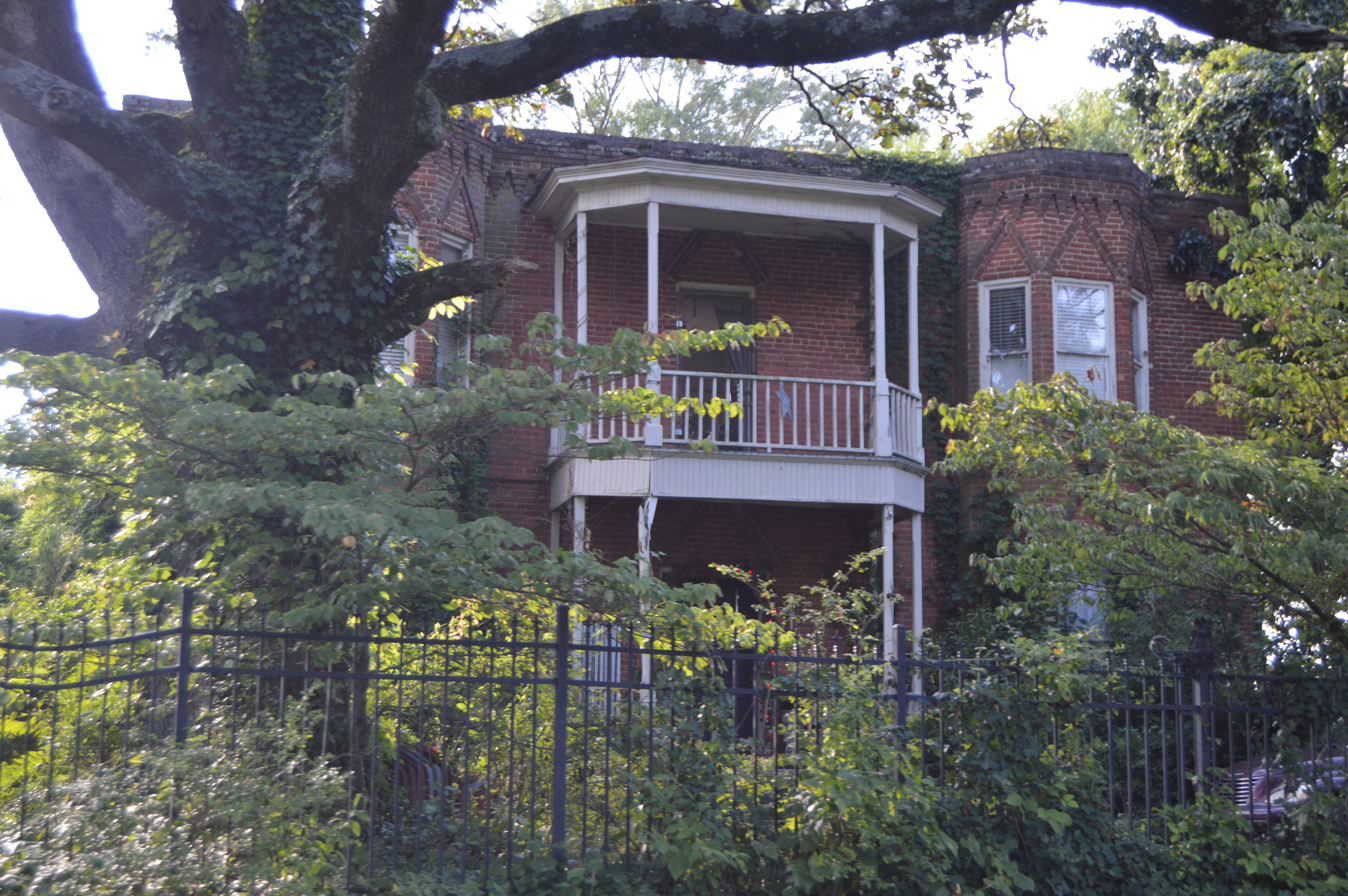
- Facade

- Location within North Carolina Location within the United States
- Location: 608 Vance St., Reidsville, North Carolina
- Coordinates: 36°21′19″N 79°40′42″W
- Area: less than one acre
- Built: c. 1888
- Built by: William G. Jennings
- Architectural style: Gothic, Italianate
- MPS: Reidsville MRA
- NRHP reference No.: 86003387
- Added to NRHP: March 12, 1987

Jennings-Baker House is a historic home located at Reidsville, Rockingham County, North Carolina. It was built about 1888, and is a two-story, three-bay, solid masonry dwelling with vernacular Gothic and Italianate style design elements. It has symmetrical two-story, five-sided projecting bays and two-tier hip roofed porch on the front facade.

Jennings-Baker House was listed on the National Register of Historic Places in 1987.
