= O'Hanlon Building =

Historic building in North Carolina, US

- U.S. National Register of Historic Places
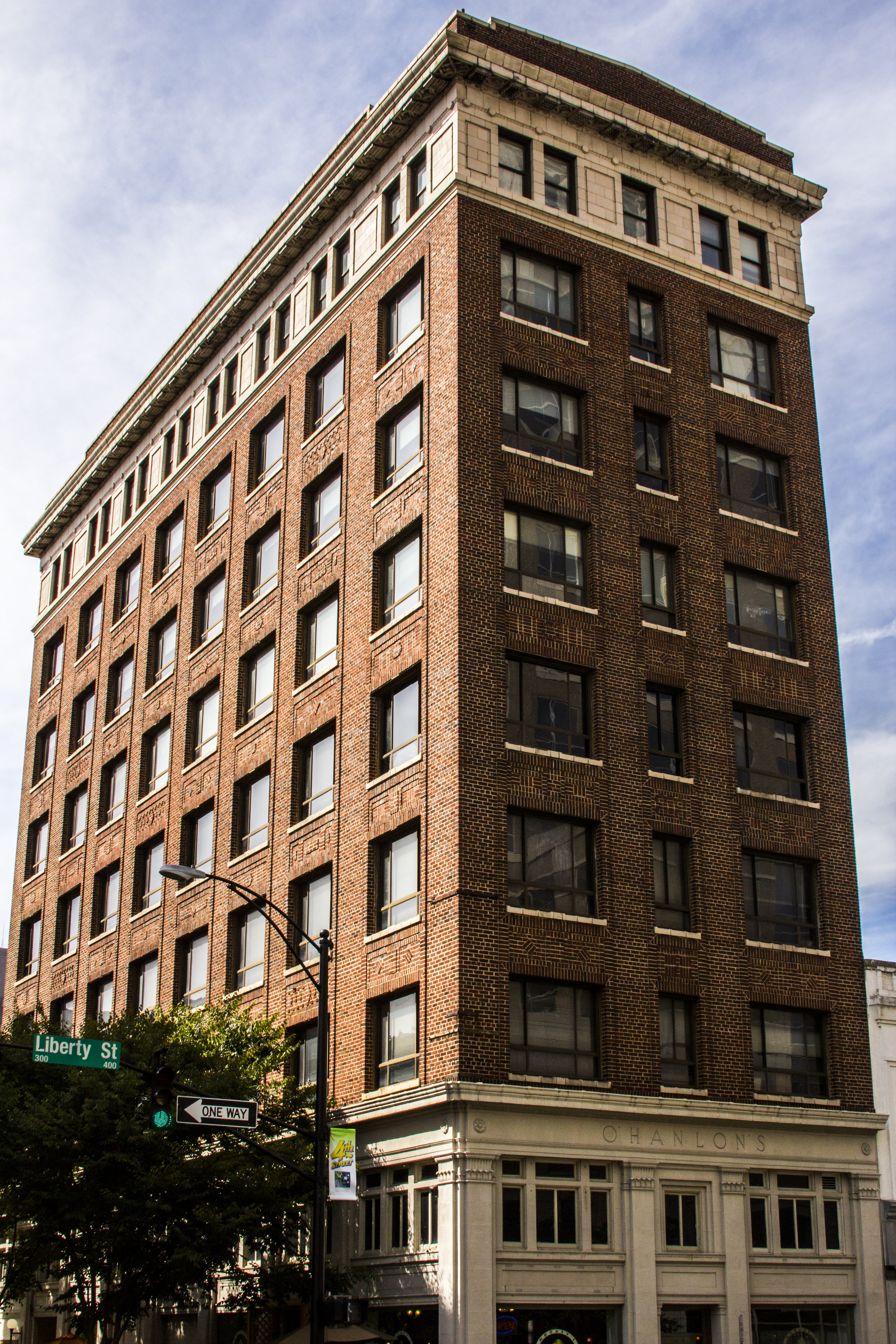
- O'Hanlon Building, September 2014

- Location within North Carolina
- Location: 103 W. 4th St., Winston-Salem, North Carolina
- Coordinates: 36°5′54″N 80°14′44″W
- Area: less than one acre
- Built: 1915; 111 years ago
- Architect: Northup, Willard C.
- NRHP reference No.: 84002269
- Added to NRHP: July 12, 1984

O'Hanlon Building is a historic commercial building located at Winston-Salem, Forsyth County, North Carolina. It was designed by architect Willard C. Northup and built in 1915. It is an eight-story, steel frame building clad in brick and terra cotta, and is the city's second-oldest skyscraper. It was Winston-Salem's tallest building until 1917 and according to Ted Kairys of Kairys Real Estate Group, it was the tallest building in North Carolina during that time. Kairys also said E.W. O'Hanlon, who tore down his drugstore at the site, moved the drugstore into the first floor of his building. The building has 26,088 square feet.

It was listed on the National Register of Historic Places in 1984.

O'Hanlon LLC bought the O'Hanlon Building in 2016 for $2.15 million from seven sellers. SC Deacons OZ LLC of Greenville, South Carolina bought the building for $2.1 million in a deal completed December 15, 2022. Lou Baldwin of Baldwin Properties, which represented both parties, said renovations included a new roof and a new elevator, along with open floor plans on three floors. More renovations were planned.
