= Indera Mills =

Historic building in North Carolina, US

- U.S. National Register of Historic Places
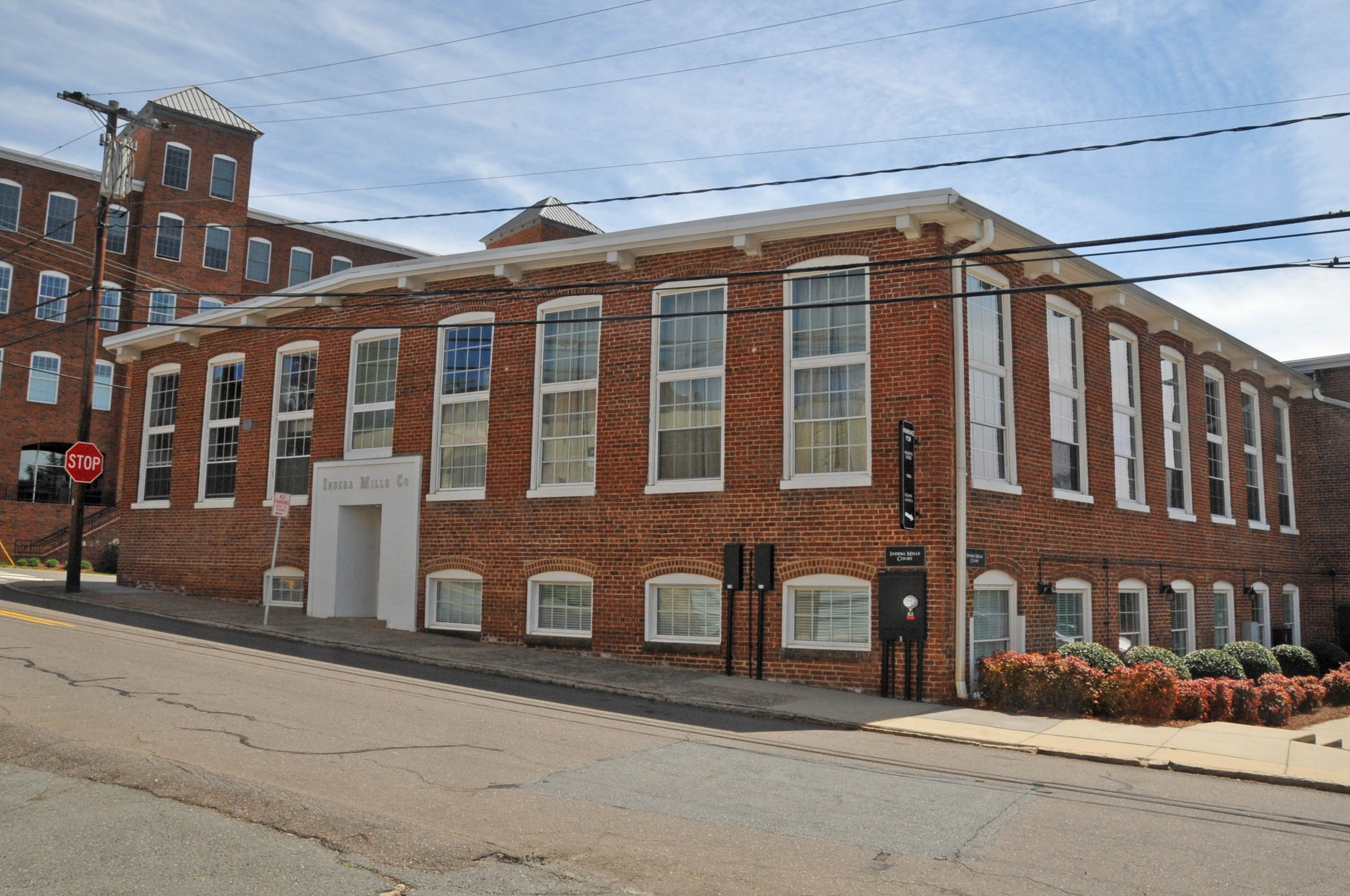
- Indera Mills, September 2007

- Location within North Carolina Location within the United States
- Location: 400 S. Marshall St., Winston-Salem, North Carolina
- Coordinates: 36°5′22″N 80°14′50″W
- Area: 2 acres (0.81 ha)
- Built: 1904; 122 years ago, 1907–1912, 1916
- Architect: Northup & O'Brien
- NRHP reference No.: 99000843
- Added to NRHP: July 15, 1999

Indera Mills, also known as Maline Mills, is a historic textile mill complex located at Winston-Salem, Forsyth County, North Carolina. The complex includes a two-story, gable roof brick building with a brick addition (c. 1904, 1916); a small, one-story brick boiler room building (c. 1904); and two flat-roof brick buildings built between 1907 and 1912 with their long sides contiguous. Indera Mills occupied the complex until 1998. The complex has been converted to commercial and residential use.

It was listed on the National Register of Historic Places in 1999.
