= Pepper Building =

Historic building in North Carolina, US

- U.S. National Register of Historic Places
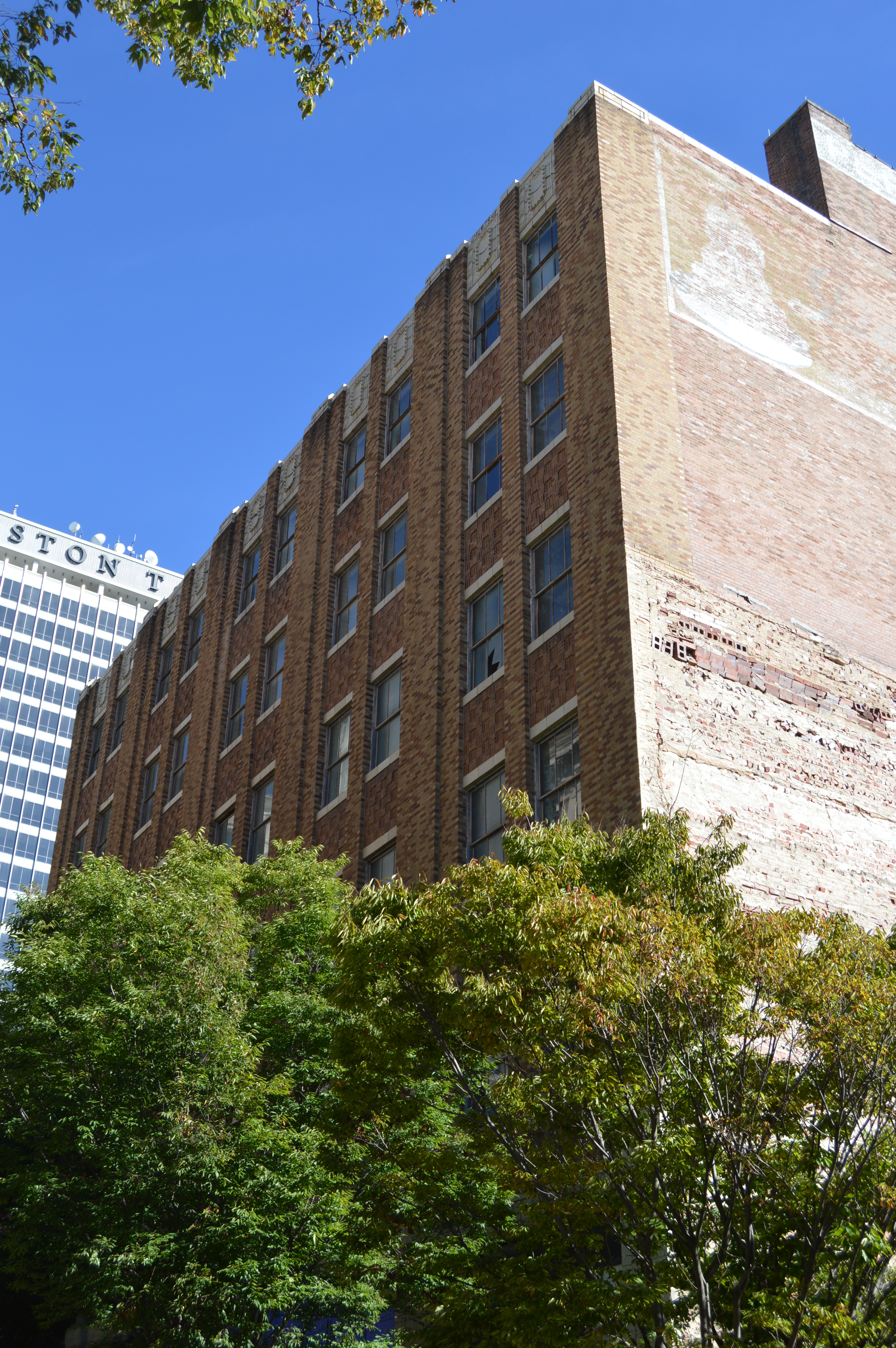
- Facade

- Location within North Carolina Location within the United States
- Location: 100-106 W. 4th St., Winston-Salem, North Carolina
- Coordinates: 36°5′53″N 80°14′42″W
- Area: 0.16 acres (0.065 ha)
- Built: 1928; 98 years ago
- Architect: Northup and O'Brien
- Architectural style: Art Deco
- NRHP reference No.: 12000263
- Added to NRHP: October 20, 2014

The Pepper Building is a historic commercial building located at Winston-Salem, Forsyth County, North Carolina. It was designed by the architectural firm Northup and O'Brien and built in 1928. It is a six-story, brick building with Art Deco style detailing. It has a flat, parapeted roof and terra cotta decorative elements, including lions' heads and pilasters. The building originally housed a department store.

It was listed on the National Register of Historic Places in 2014.
