= Richardson Houses Historic District =

Historic district in North Carolina, United States

- U.S. National Register of Historic Places
- U.S. Historic district
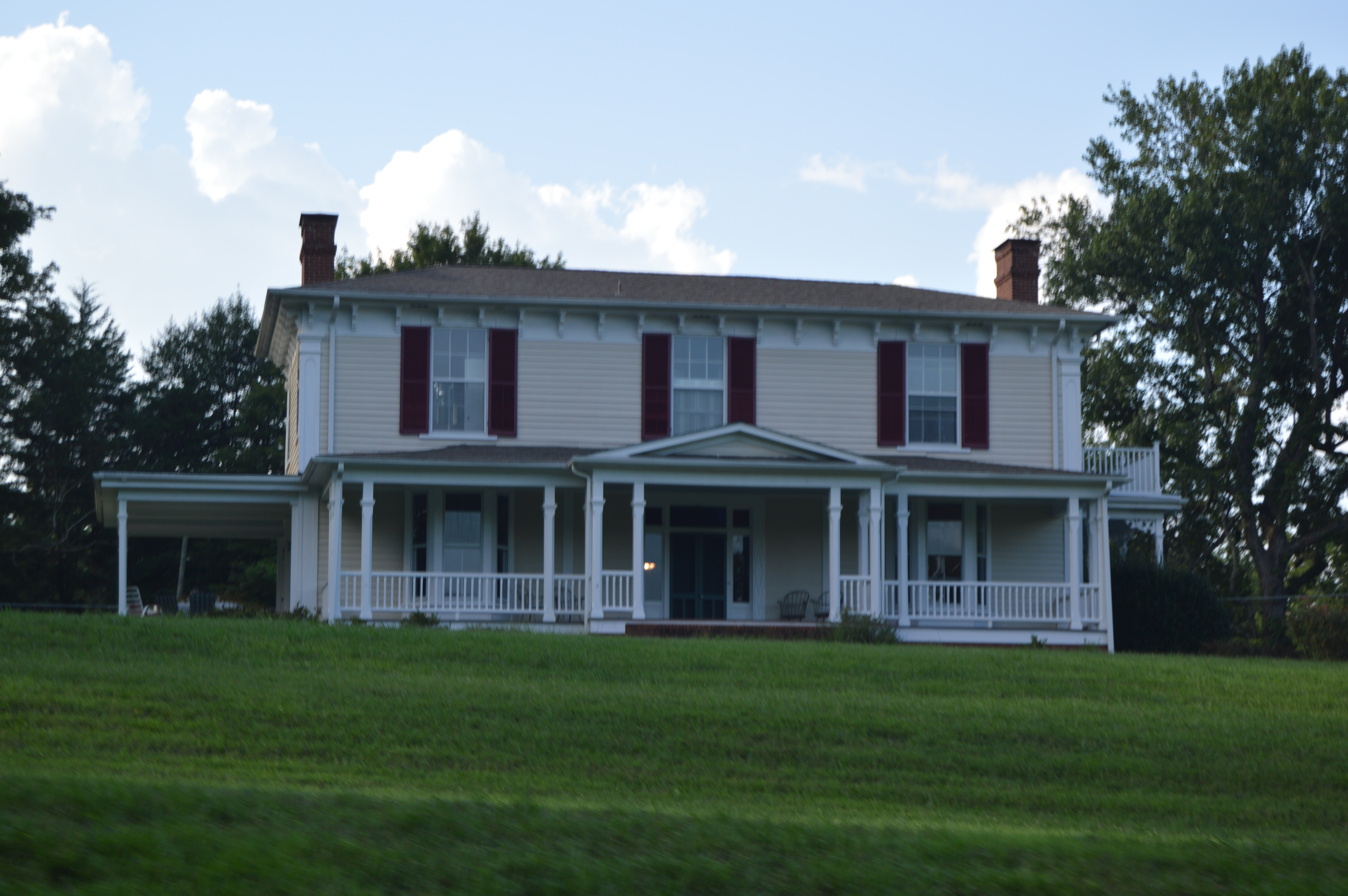
- The Robert Payne Richardson House II

- Location within North Carolina Location within the United States
- Location: Northwestern side of Richardson Dr. between Coach Rd. and Woodland Dr., Reidsville, North Carolina
- Coordinates: 36°20′31″N 79°40′58″W
- Area: 30 acres (12 ha)
- Built: c. 1840-1912
- Architect: George Franklin Barber, et al.
- Architectural style: Classical Revival, Greek Revival, Italianate
- MPS: Reidsville MRA
- NRHP reference No.: 86003390
- Added to NRHP: December 11, 1986

Richardson Houses Historic District is a national historic district located at Reidsville, Rockingham County, North Carolina. It encompasses 17 contributing buildings and 2 contributing structures in a residential section of Reidsville. It was developed between about 1840 and 1912, and includes notable examples of Italianate, Greek Revival, and Classical Revival style architecture. The three principal buildings in the district are the Robert Payne Richardson House I (c. 1842), the Robert Payne Richardson House II, North Belmont (c. 1860), and the Robert Payne Richardson House III, Belmont (1912).

It was listed on the National Register of Historic Places in 1986.
