= First Baptist Church (Reidsville, North Carolina) =

Historic church in North Carolina, United States

- U.S. National Register of Historic Places
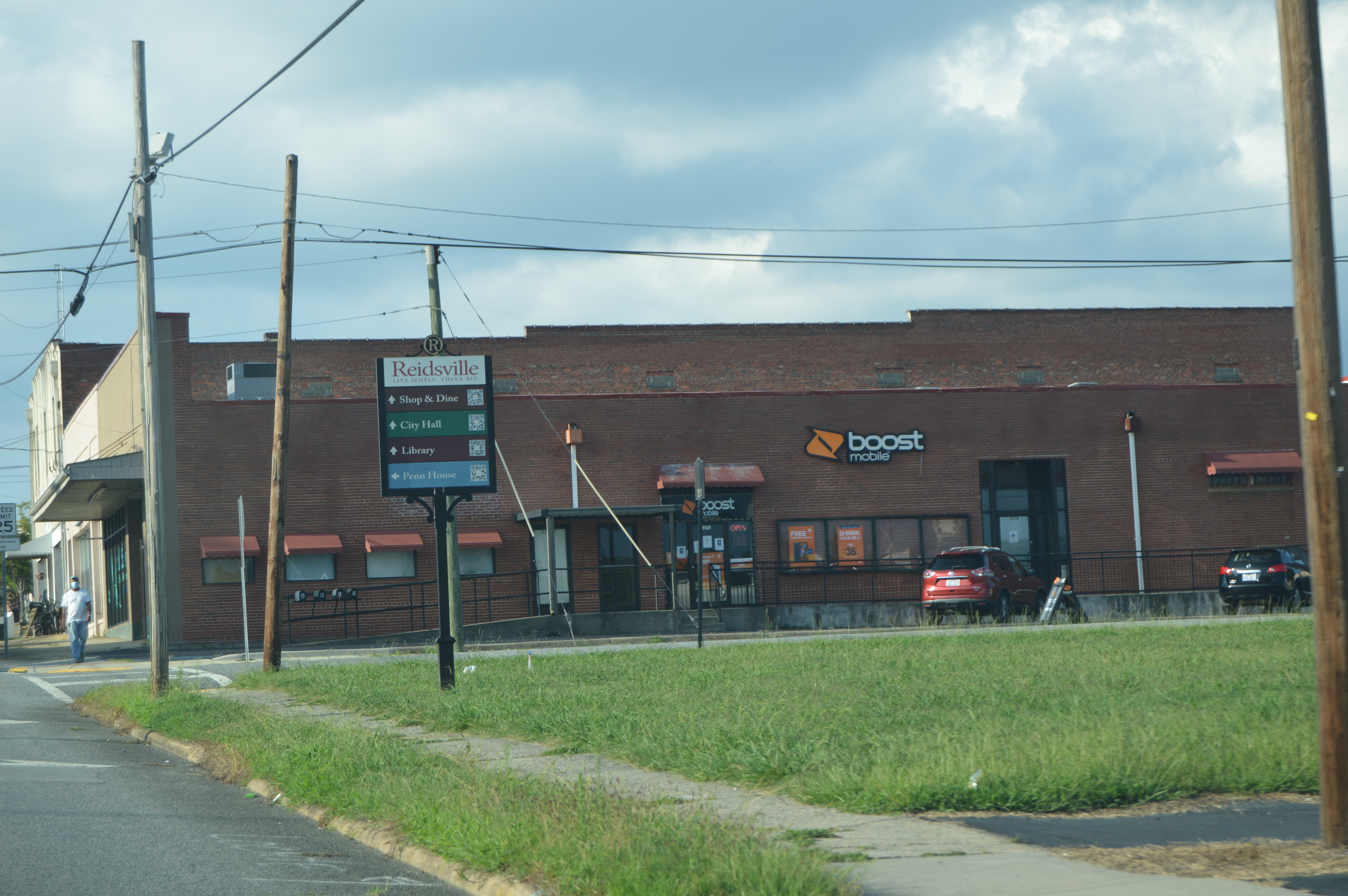
- Site overview

- Location within North Carolina Location within the United States
- Location: 401 S. Scales St., Reidsville, North Carolina
- Coordinates: 36°21′26″N 79°39′52″W
- Area: less than one acre
- Built: 1918
- Architectural style: Late Gothic Revival
- MPS: Reidsville MRA
- NRHP reference No.: 86003386
- Added to NRHP: December 11, 1986

First Baptist Church was a historic Southern Baptist church located at 409 S. Scales Street in Reidsville, Rockingham County, North Carolina. It was built in 1918, and was a Late Gothic Revival-style brick church. It has a three bay wide front facade with crenellated towers of unequal height and a three-part tracery stained glass window. It was home to an African-American Baptist congregation until the mid-1970s.

It was added to the National Register of Historic Places in 1986. It has since been demolished.
