= Agnew Hunter Bahnson House =

Historic house in North Carolina, United States

- U.S. National Register of Historic Places
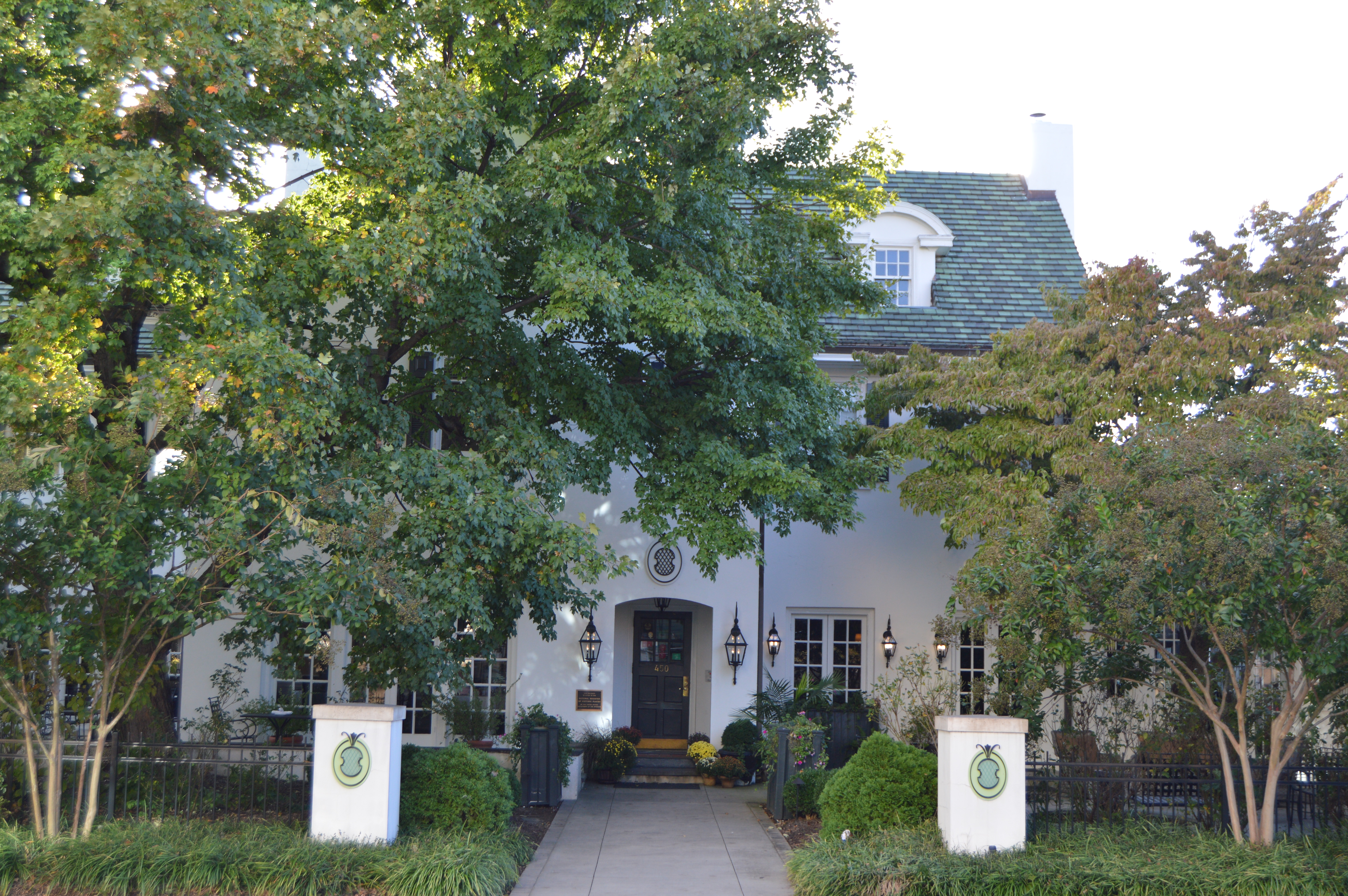
- Spring Street entrance

- Location within North Carolina Location within the United States
- Location: Jct. of W. Fifth and Spring Sts., Winston-Salem, North Carolina
- Coordinates: 36°5′54″N 80°15′12″W
- Area: less than one acre
- Built: 1920; 106 years ago
- Architect: Northup, Willard C.
- Architectural style: Colonial Revival, English Cottage
- NRHP reference No.: 01000375
- Added to NRHP: April 12, 2001

The Agnew Hunter Bahnson House is a historic house located at Winston-Salem, Forsyth County, North Carolina.

== Description and history ==
It was designed by architect Willard C. Northup and built in 1920. It is a large two-story, asymmetrical, stuccoed English Cottage style dwelling with a Colonial Revival interior. It has a cross-gable roof with a hipped roof over a long wing. It was built by Agnew Hunter Bahnson, one of Winston-Salem's most prominent industrialists.

It was listed on the National Register of Historic Places on April 12, 2001.
