= Ardmore Historic District =

Historic district in North Carolina, United States

- U.S. National Register of Historic Places
- U.S. Historic district
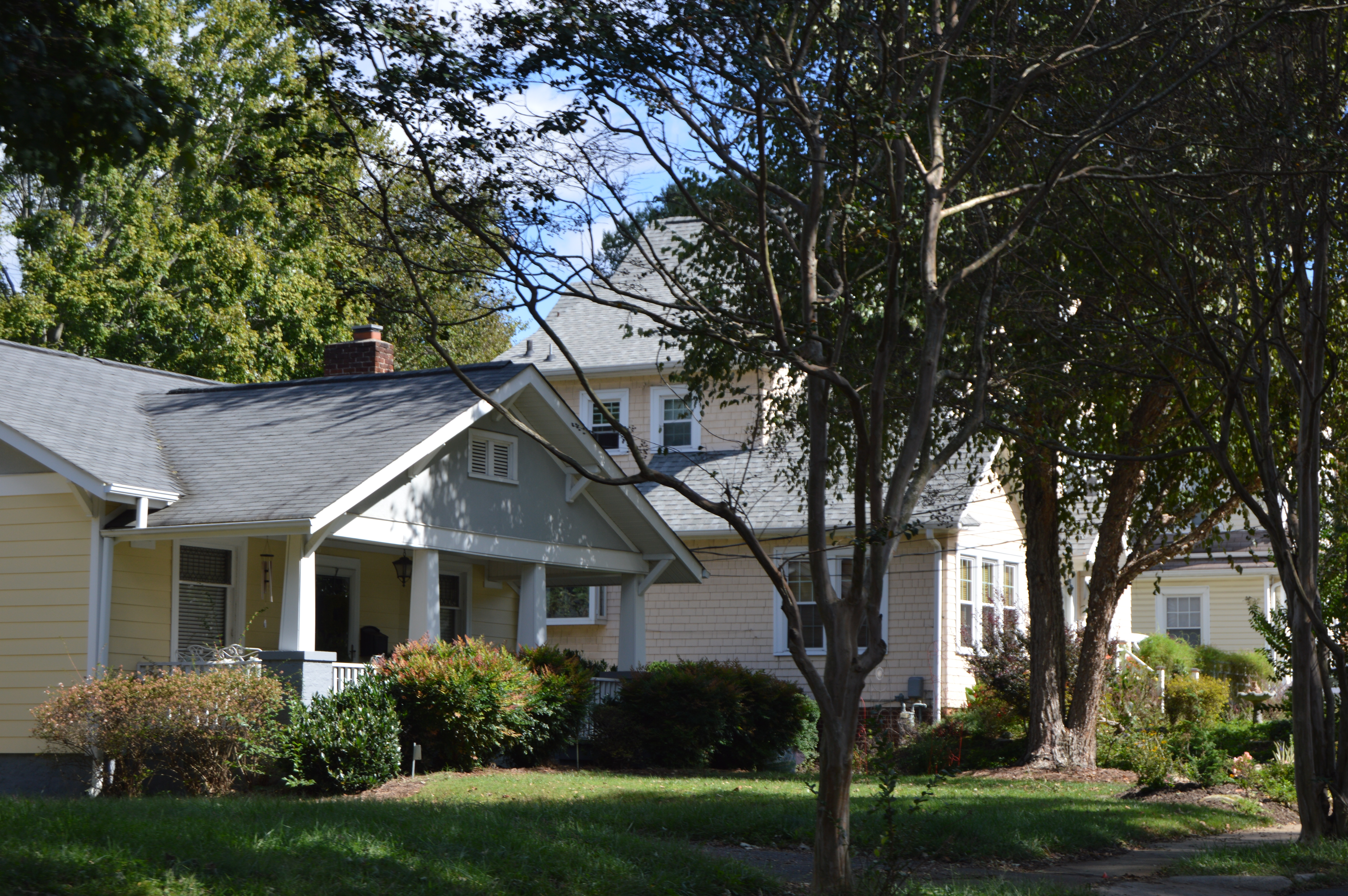
- Houses on Westover Boulevard

- Location within North Carolina Location within the United States
- Location: Roughly bounded by Knollwood, Queen, Duke, and Ardsley Sts., Winston-Salem, North Carolina
- Coordinates: 36°05′03″N 80°16′29″W
- Area: 600 acres (240 ha)
- Built: 1914
- Architect: Crews, Hall; Northup & O'Brien
- Architectural style: Queen Anne, Bungalow/craftsman
- NRHP reference No.: 04000904
- Added to NRHP: August 25, 2004

The Ardmore Historic District is a 600-acre (240 ha) national historic district located at Winston-Salem, Forsyth County, North Carolina. The district encompasses 2,093 contributing buildings and two contributing sites. The district consists of at least ten platted residential developments from 1910 through 1924 as well as three large apartment complexes from 1947 through 1951, one of which was controversially demolished in 2021. It includes works designed by Hall Crews and by Northup & O'Brien. It includes Queen Anne and Bungalow/craftsman architecture.

It was listed on the National Register of Historic Places in 2004.
