= North Washington Avenue Workers' House =

Historic house in North Carolina, United States

- U.S. National Register of Historic Places
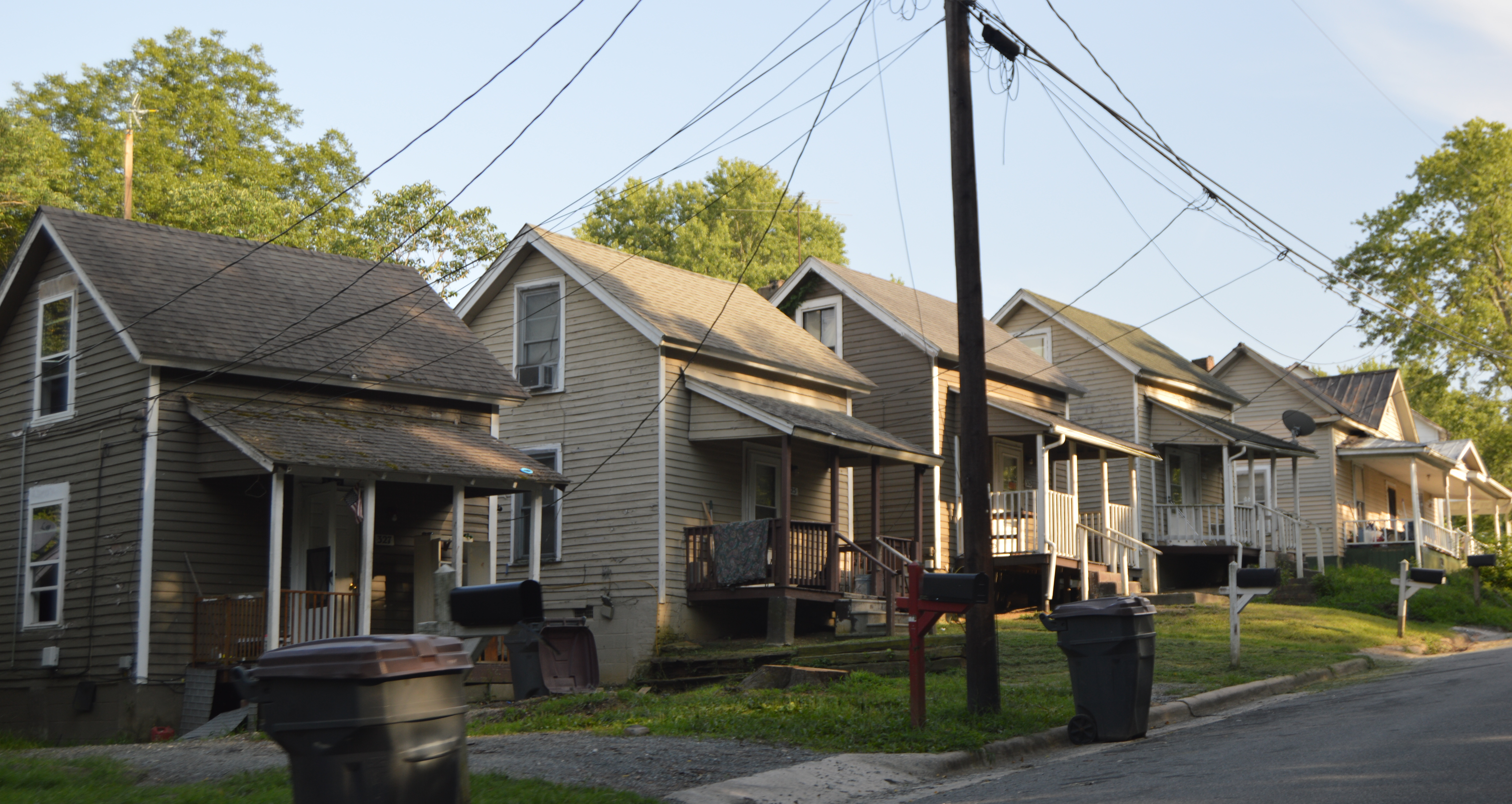
- Street view

- Location within North Carolina Location within the United States
- Location: Eastern side of the 300 block of N. Washington Ave., Reidsville, North Carolina
- Coordinates: 36°21′55″N 79°40′17″W
- Area: less than one acre
- Built: c. 1917
- MPS: Reidsville MRA
- NRHP reference No.: 86003388
- Added to NRHP: December 11, 1986

North Washington Avenue Workers' House are five historic homes located at Reidsville, Rockingham County, North Carolina. They were built about 1917, for African-American workers employed by the American Tobacco Company. The houses originally consisted of three rooms—one-over-one with a shed room behind.

It was listed on the National Register of Historic Places in 1986.
