= Former Reidsville High School =

Historic school building in North Carolina, United States

- U.S. National Register of Historic Places
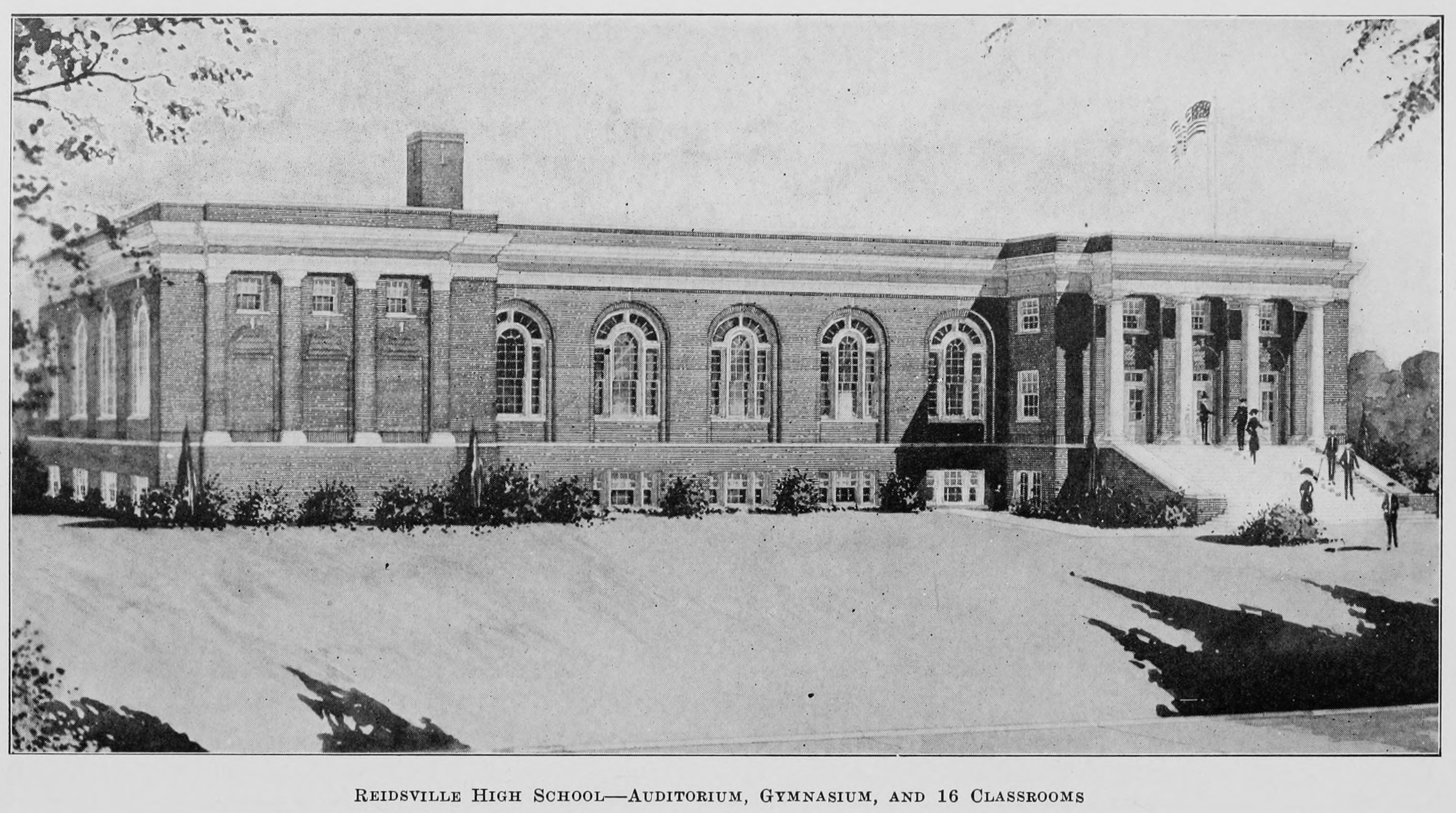
- Reidsville High School, 1920s

- Location within North Carolina Location within the United States
- Location: 116 N. Franklin St., Reidsville, North Carolina
- Coordinates: 36°21′46″N 79°40′14″W
- Area: 1.6 acres (0.65 ha)
- Built: 1923; 103 years ago
- Built by: L.B. Flora
- Architect: Willard C. Northup
- Architectural style: Classical Revival, Colonial Revival
- NRHP reference No.: 93001540
- Added to NRHP: January 21, 1994

The former Reidsville High School, also known as Reidsville Junior High School and Reidsville Middle School, is a historic school building located at Reidsville, Rockingham County, North Carolina. It was designed by architect Willard C. Northup and built in 1923. It is a three-story, L-shaped, brick building with a combination of Colonial and Classical Revival stylistic features. A matching one-bay addition was built in 1941. It features a two-story tetrastyle portico of Tuscan order columns and terra cotta trim. It ceased use as a high school in 1960, with the construction of Reidsville High School and the building closed permanently as a school in 1980.

It was listed on the National Register of Historic Places in 1994.
