= Penn House =

Historic house in North Carolina, United States

- U.S. National Register of Historic Places
- U.S. Historic district – Contributing property
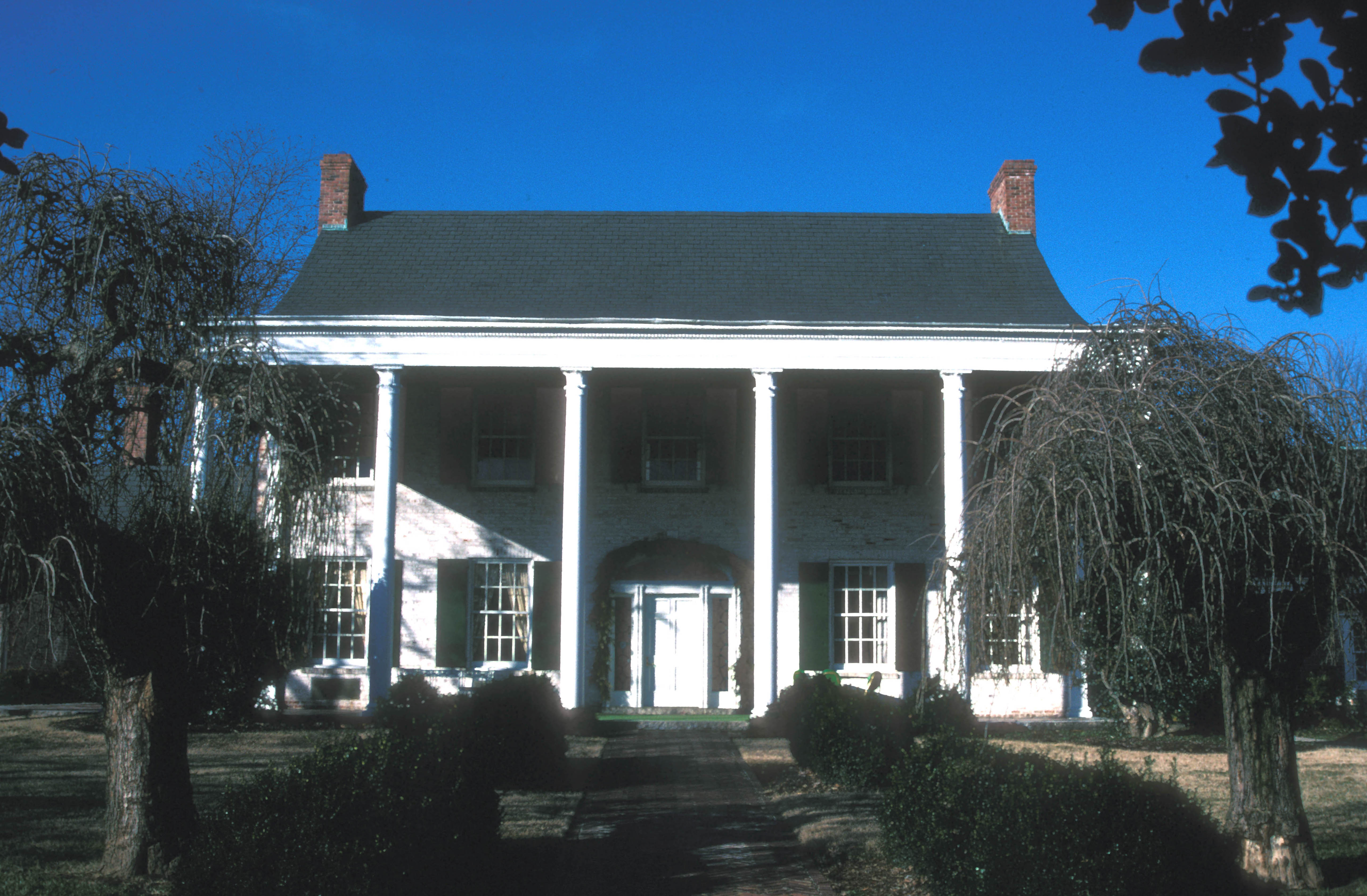
- Penn House, July 1971

- Location within North Carolina Location within the United States
- Location: 324 Maple Ave., Reidsville, North Carolina
- Coordinates: 36°21′27″N 79°40′9″W
- Area: 3 acres (1.2 ha)
- Built: c. 1910, 1932
- Built by: Hurd, Bryant
- Architectural style: Colonial Revival, Prairie School
- NRHP reference No.: 83003992
- Added to NRHP: November 25, 1983

Penn House is a historic home located at Reidsville, Rockingham County, North Carolina. The main house was built in 1932, and is a 2 1/2-story, Colonial Revival-style blond brick dwelling. The house consists of the main block; a one-story, L-shaped wing; a one-story servants' quarters; and a one-story kitchen wing behind the main block. The front facade features a full-facade, full-height portico with six Corinthian order columns. It replaced a Prairie School inspired dwelling erected on the site about 1910. Also on the property are the contributing two-story garage and servants' apartment (c. 1914–1922); smokehouse (before 1922); slate-roofed gazebo; pump house (1922–1929); and two greenhouses.

It was listed on the National Register of Historic Places in 1983. It is located in the Reidsville Historic District.
