= Downtown North Historic District (Winston-Salem, North Carolina) =

Historic district in North Carolina, United States

- U.S. National Register of Historic Places
- U.S. Historic district
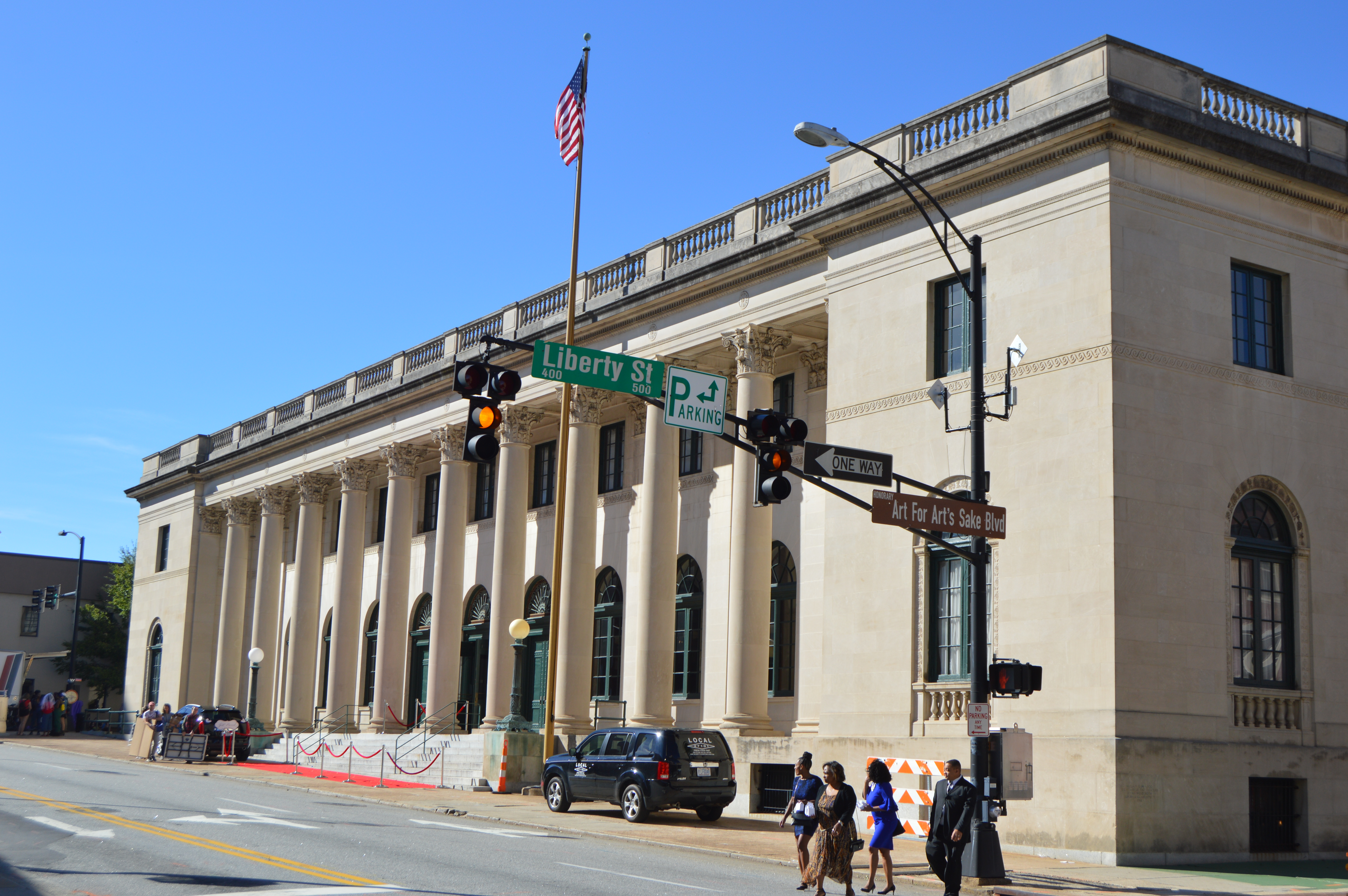
- Millennium Center southern facade

- Location within North Carolina Location within the United States
- Location: Roughly bounded by W. Fifth, W. Eighth, N. Main and N. Cherry Sts., Winston-Salem, North Carolina
- Coordinates: 36°06′06″N 80°14′45″W
- Area: 20 acres (8.1 ha)
- Built: 1907
- Architect: Wenderoth, Oscar; Northup and O'Brien
- Architectural style: Early Commercial, Beaux Arts
- NRHP reference No.: 02001669
- Added to NRHP: December 31, 2002

Downtown North Historic District, also known as Trade Street District, is a national historic district located at Winston-Salem, Forsyth County, North Carolina, USA. The district encompasses 46 contributing buildings in a commercial section of Winston-Salem. They were built between about 1907 and 1952, and most are one- or two-story brick buildings, sometimes with a stuccoed surface. Notable buildings include the Beaux-Arts style former United States Post Office (1914-1915, 1936-1937) with an addition by Northup and O'Brien, Brown-Rogers-Dixson Company Building (1928), Centenary Church Education Building (1920s), Pure Oil Station, City Market (1925), and Twin City Motor Company (1925).

It was listed on the National Register of Historic Places in 2002.
