= Reidsville, North Carolina =

- City
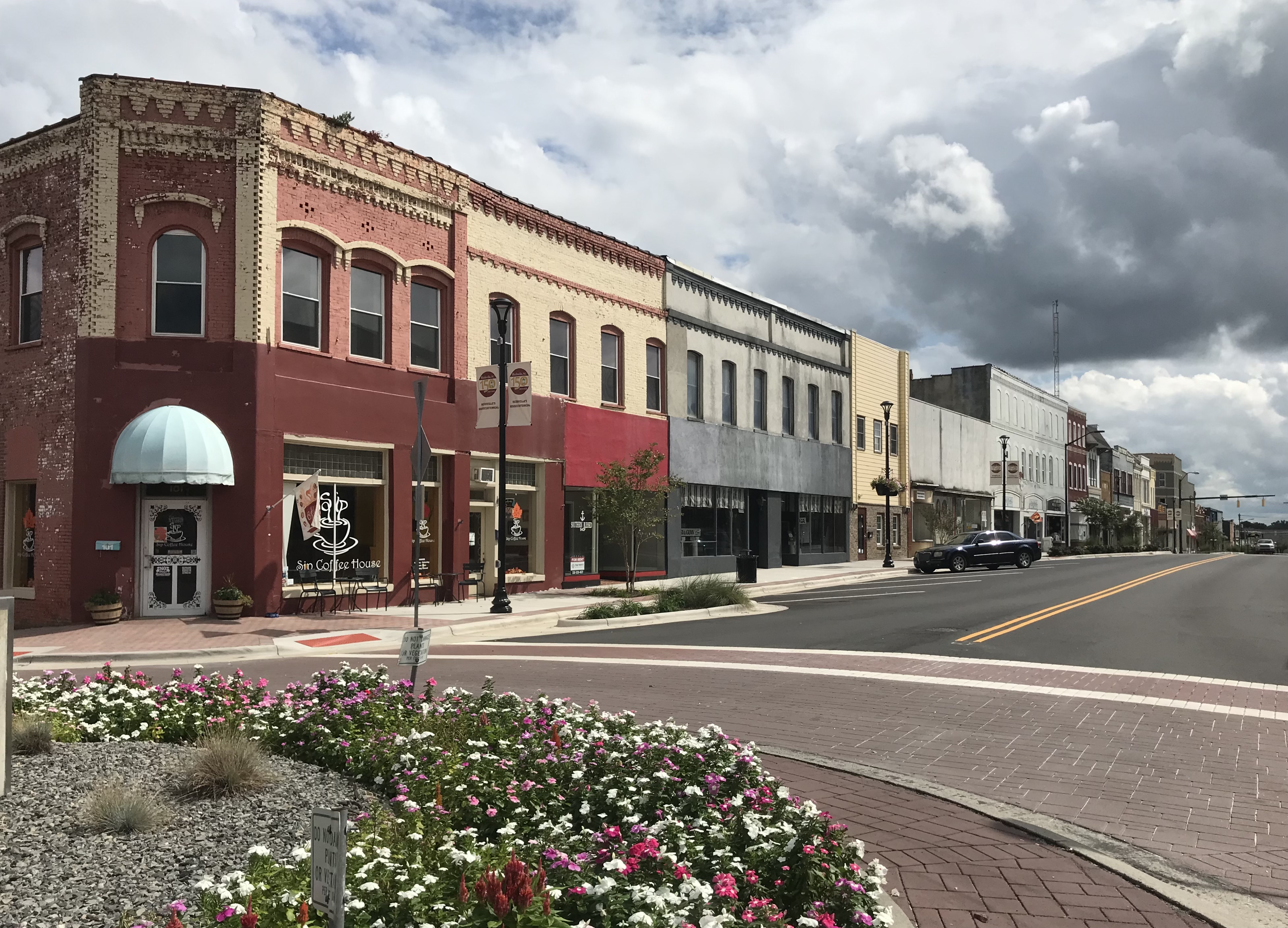
- South Scales Street

- Seal
- Motto: "Live Simply. Think Big."
- Location of Reidsville, North Carolina Reidsville, North Carolina (the United States)
- Coordinates: 36°20′16″N 79°40′21″W
- Country: United States
- State: North Carolina
- County: Rockingham
- Established: 1873

Government
  - Mayor: Donald L. Gorham
  - Mayor Pro-Tem: Harry L. Brown

Area
  - Total: 16.25 sq mi (42.09 km^{2})
  - Land: 14.81 sq mi (38.36 km^{2})
  - Water: 1.44 sq mi (3.73 km^{2})
- Elevation: 732 ft (223 m)

Population (2020)
  - Total: 14,583
  - Density: 984.6/sq mi (380.16/km^{2})
- Time zone: UTC−5 (Eastern (EST))
  - Summer (DST): UTC−4 (EDT)
- ZIP codes: 27320, 27323
- Area code(s): 336, 743
- FIPS code: 37-55900
- GNIS feature ID: 2404605
- Website: www.reidsvillenc.gov

Reidsville is a city in Rockingham County in the U.S. state of North Carolina. At the 2020 census, the city had a total population of 14,583. Reidsville is included in the Greensboro–High Point Metropolitan Statistical Area of the Piedmont Triad.

Reidsville was established in the early 19th century as an outpost and stop on the stage line that ran between Salisbury, North Carolina, and Danville, Virginia, and was originally known as Wright's Crossroads. The community grew from a single home and inn owned by the family of Reuben Reid – a local farmer, businessman, justice of the peace and father of David S. Reid – into a thriving farming community primarily supporting tobacco production and cigarette manufacturing.

Reidsville was officially incorporated by the North Carolina State Legislature in 1873 and became a key location of the American Tobacco Company which employed large numbers of city and county residents. The American Tobacco Company was the mainstay of Reidsville economics until its sale and closure in 1994. Many textile mills were established in Reidsville as well, with Cone Mills and Burlington Industries, located in Burlington North Carolina, consolidating most of them in the mid-20th century, although most have now closed.

While Reidsville has experienced economic recession in recent years the community has enjoyed a renewal of growth as a sleeper city supplying a source of rural development for the surrounding larger cities.

== History ==
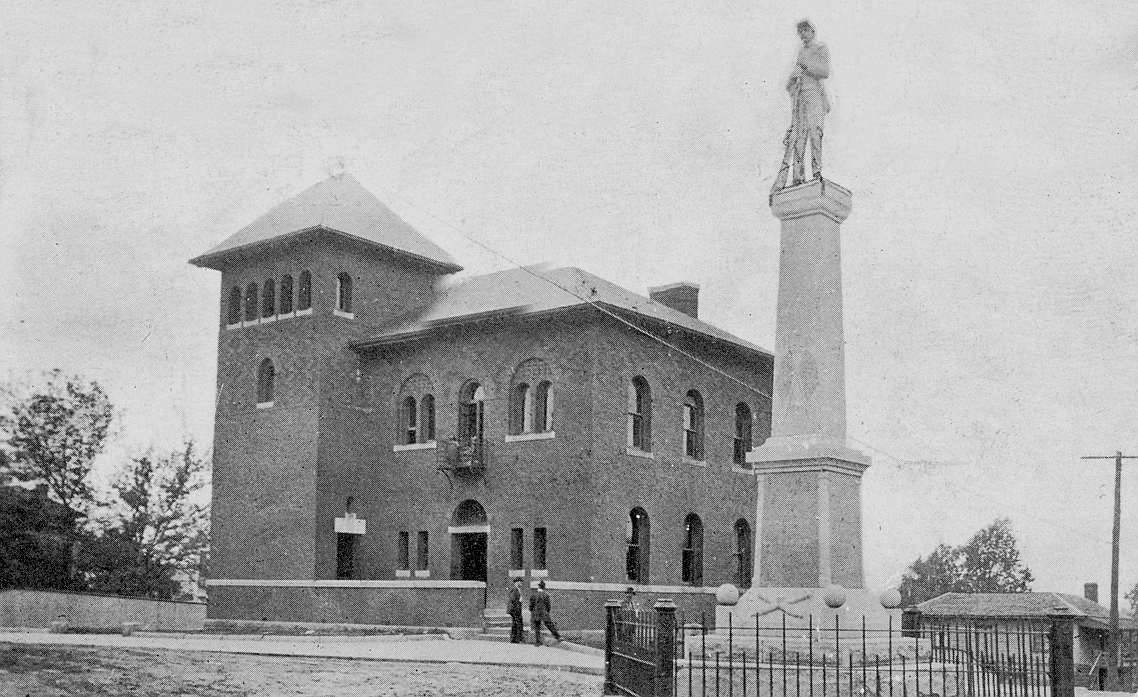
Post office and Confederate statue (1912)

The roots of Reidsville date back to the early 19th century when William Wright of the Little Troublesome Creek area owned a tavern and store on the road connecting Danville and Salem. This outpost, called Wright's Crossroads, was the earliest settlement in the present-day city and was overseen by Wright's son, Nathan, and then Nathan Wright's son-in-law, Robert Payne Richardson. Richardson's home, built in 1842 on a knoll overlooking Little Troublesome Creek, still remains on Richardson Drive and has the distinction of being the oldest standing house in the city.

Reuben Reid of the Hogan's Creek area moved his family, including wife, Elizabeth Williams Settle, and son, David Settle Reid, to a 700-acre (2.8 km^{2}) farm on the ridge between Wolf Island and Little Troublesome creeks in May 1814. Reuben Reid became a successful farmer, operated a store and a public inn maintained in a private home and served the county as a constable and justice of the peace. When the family secured a post office, aptly named Reidsville, in 1829, 16-year-old David Reid was appointed its first postmaster. He later became a State Senator (1835–42), a U.S. Congressman (1843–47), Governor of North Carolina (1850) and a U.S. Senator (1854).

On November 26, 1858, William Lindsey of Pittsylvania County, Virginia, was high bidder for a 384-acre (1.55 km^{2}) tract of land known as Reidsville. He and his bride, Sarah Holderby, a daughter of Joseph Holderby of the northern part of the county, moved into the frame house Reuben Reid had built across from his store. It is now a landmark in Reidsville, the first frame house built in the village.

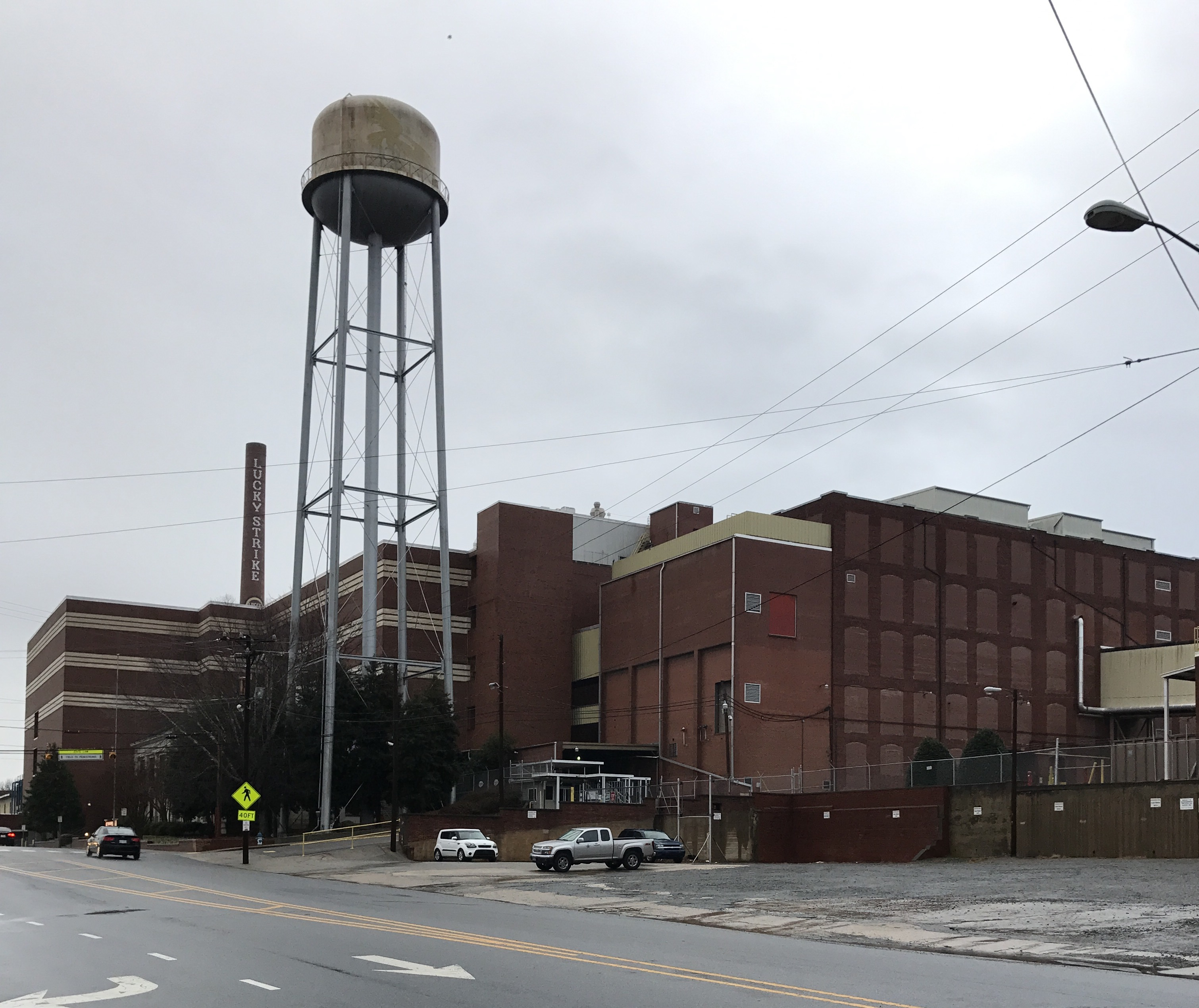
American Tobacco factory building

Reidsville is located in east-central Rockingham County. The Southern Railroad passes through the center of the city from north to south. However, the town has not had a functional train station since 1988.

The town was incorporated in 1873 by the Legislature. Tobacco was a mainstay of the local economy for many years, with the history of the city tightly woven with that of American Tobacco Company.

With the sale of American Tobacco in 1994, city leaders have diversified the local economy. The Reidsville Chamber of Commerce, established in 1923 by business leaders in the community, is now located downtown.

The Chinqua-Penn Plantation, First Baptist Church, Jennings-Baker House, Richardson Houses Historic District, Reuben Wallace McCollum House, North Washington Avenue Workers' House, Penn House, Gov. David S. Reid House, Reidsville High School, Former, and Reidsville Historic District are listed on the National Register of Historic Places.

== Geography ==
According to the United States Census Bureau, the city has a total area of 14.9 square miles (39 km^{2}), of which 13.4 square miles (35 km^{2}) is land and 1.5 square miles (3.9 km^{2}) is water. The total area is 10.14% water.

=== Downtown area ===
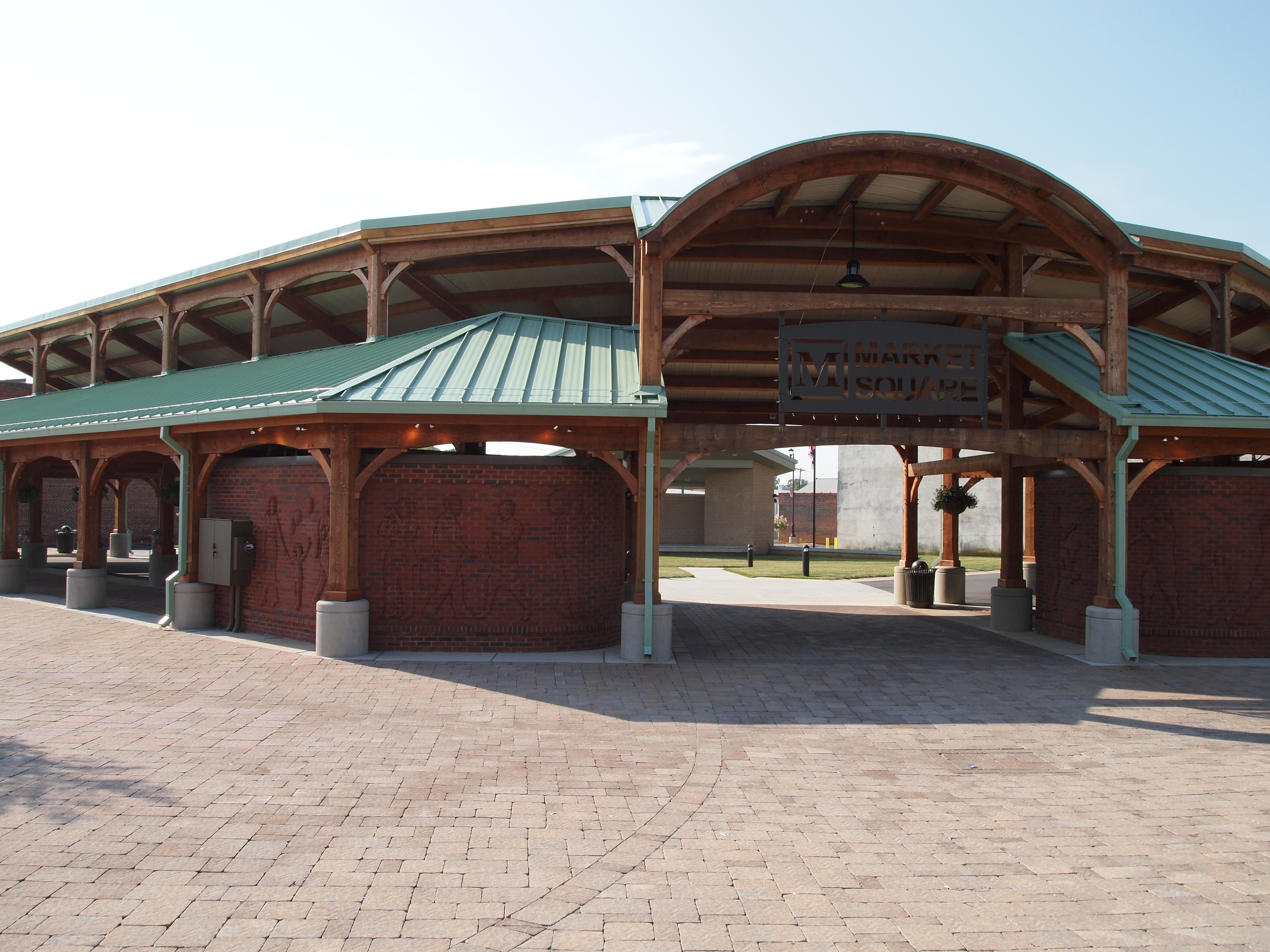
Market Square

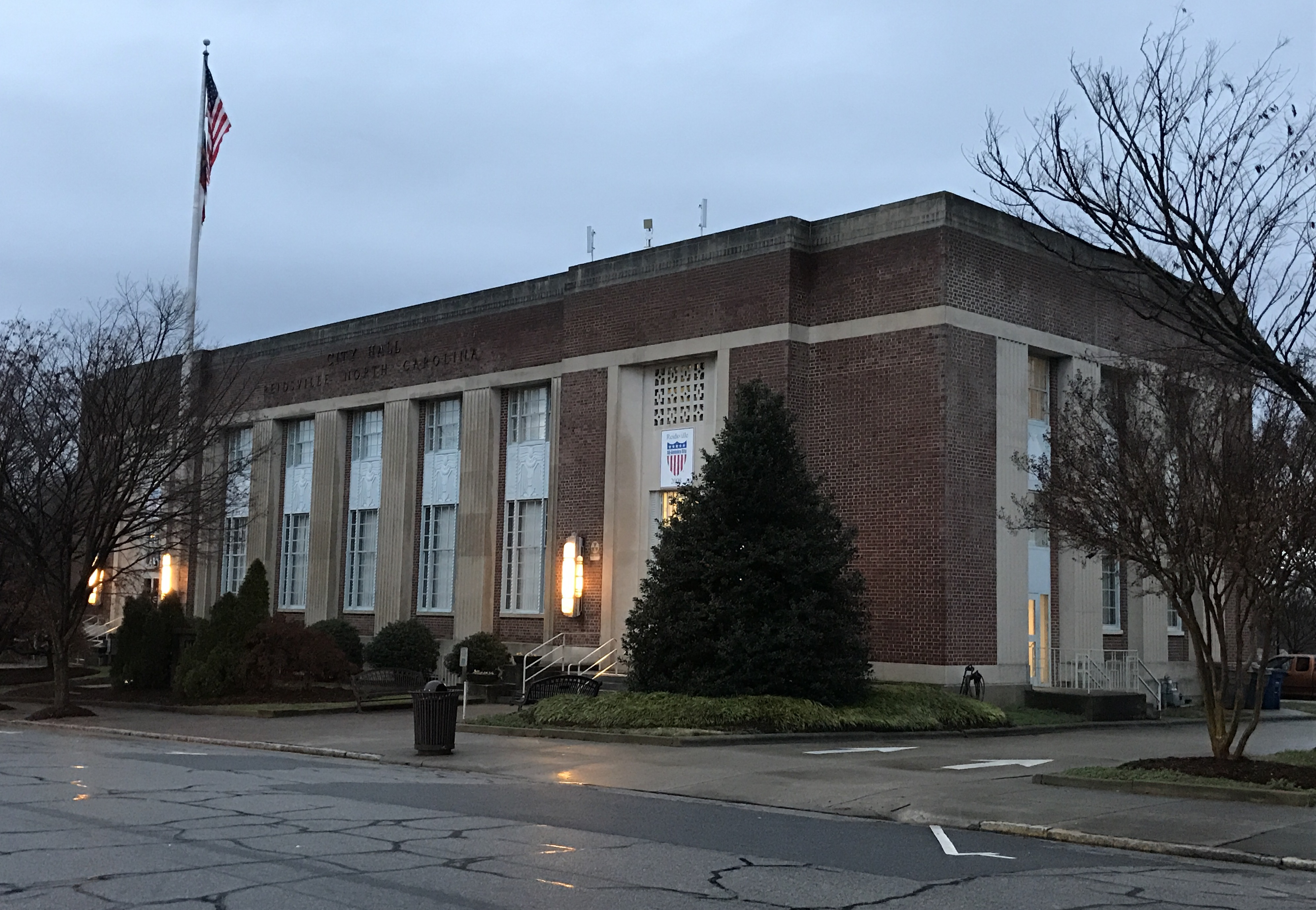
City hall

The downtown area of Reidsville was like many of its counterparts across the state in the 1970s, seeing a decline in business opportunities due to the emergence of malls and shopping centers. The Reidsville Downtown Corporation, a non-profit organization financed by monies from the Downtown District Tax, was created in 1976 to lead the charge to revitalize the downtown.

Joint projects of the Downtown Corporation and the City of Reidsville have been participation in the Main Street Program, the Streetscape Program and Façade Incentive Grant program. Each of these programs was initiated to aid in the revitalization of the downtown and improve the area aesthetically.

== Climate ==
According to the Köppen Climate Classification system, Reidsville has a humid subtropical climate, abbreviated "Cfa" on climate maps. The hottest temperature recorded in Reidsville was 108 °F (42.2 °C) on July 14, 1954, while the coldest temperature recorded was −9 °F (−22.8 °C) on January 21, 1985.

Climate data for Reidsville, North Carolina, 1991–2020 normals, extremes 1901–present (Note: REIDSVILLE 1901–1962, REIDSVILLE 2 NW 1963–PRESENT)
Month	Jan	Feb	Mar	Apr	May	Jun	Jul	Aug	Sep	Oct	Nov	Dec	Year
Record high °F (°C)	82 (28)	84 (29)	93 (34)	94 (34)	100 (38)	105 (41)	108 (42)	105 (41)	105 (41)	99 (37)	88 (31)	80 (27)	108 (42)
Mean daily maximum °F (°C)	48.0 (8.9)	51.5 (10.8)	59.3 (15.2)	69.2 (20.7)	76.4 (24.7)	83.9 (28.8)	87.5 (30.8)	85.7 (29.8)	79.9 (26.6)	70.3 (21.3)	59.8 (15.4)	51.1 (10.6)	68.6 (20.3)
Daily mean °F (°C)	38.3 (3.5)	41.1 (5.1)	48.2 (9.0)	57.6 (14.2)	65.6 (18.7)	73.8 (23.2)	77.5 (25.3)	75.8 (24.3)	69.7 (20.9)	59.1 (15.1)	49.0 (9.4)	41.5 (5.3)	58.1 (14.5)
Mean daily minimum °F (°C)	28.7 (−1.8)	30.7 (−0.7)	37.1 (2.8)	45.9 (7.7)	54.9 (12.7)	63.6 (17.6)	67.5 (19.7)	65.9 (18.8)	59.5 (15.3)	47.9 (8.8)	38.1 (3.4)	32.0 (0.0)	47.7 (8.7)
Record low °F (°C)	−9 (−23)	0 (−18)	8 (−13)	20 (−7)	32 (0)	40 (4)	48 (9)	45 (7)	35 (2)	23 (−5)	10 (−12)	−1 (−18)	−9 (−23)
Average precipitation inches (mm)	3.98 (101)	3.15 (80)	4.30 (109)	4.07 (103)	3.78 (96)	4.47 (114)	4.34 (110)	4.27 (108)	4.91 (125)	3.51 (89)	3.43 (87)	3.57 (91)	47.78 (1,213)
Average snowfall inches (cm)	2.9 (7.4)	2.1 (5.3)	0.8 (2.0)	0.0 (0.0)	0.0 (0.0)	0.0 (0.0)	0.0 (0.0)	0.0 (0.0)	0.0 (0.0)	0.0 (0.0)	0.0 (0.0)	1.5 (3.8)	7.3 (18.5)
Average precipitation days (≥ 0.01 in)	10.1	9.0	10.2	9.7	11.2	10.6	10.6	9.9	8.7	7.9	7.8	9.7	115.4
Average snowy days (≥ 0.1 in)	1.1	0.8	0.4	0.0	0.0	0.0	0.0	0.0	0.0	0.0	0.0	0.3	2.6
Source 1: NOAA
Source 2: xmACIS2

== Demographics ==
Historical population
Census	Pop.	Note	%±
1880	1,316		—
1890	2,969		125.6%
1900	3,262		9.9%
1910	4,828		48.0%
1920	5,333		10.5%
1930	6,851		28.5%
1940	10,387		51.6%
1950	11,708		12.7%
1960	14,267		21.9%
1970	13,636		−4.4%
1980	12,492		−8.4%
1990	12,183		−2.5%
2000	14,485		18.9%
2010	14,520		0.2%
2020	14,583		0.4%
2025 (est.)	14,692	▲	0.7%
U.S. Decennial Census

=== 2020 census ===
Reidsville racial composition
Race	Number	Percentage
White (non-Hispanic)	6,968	47.78%
Black or African American (non-Hispanic)	5,858	40.17%
Native American	36	0.25%
Asian	90	0.62%
Pacific Islander	13	0.09%
Other/Mixed	592	4.06%
Hispanic or Latino	1,026	7.04%

As of the 2020 census, Reidsville had a population of 14,583. The median age was 42.5 years. 22.3% of residents were under the age of 18 and 20.7% of residents were 65 years of age or older. For every 100 females there were 84.7 males, and for every 100 females age 18 and over there were 80.1 males age 18 and over.

97.8% of residents lived in urban areas, while 2.2% lived in rural areas.

There were 6,423 households in Reidsville, of which 26.8% had children under the age of 18 living in them. Of all households, 31.9% were married-couple households, 20.5% were households with a male householder and no spouse or partner present, and 41.5% were households with a female householder and no spouse or partner present. About 36.7% of all households were made up of individuals and 16.6% had someone living alone who was 65 years of age or older.

There were 7,280 housing units, of which 11.8% were vacant. The homeowner vacancy rate was 2.7% and the rental vacancy rate was 9.3%.

=== 2010 census ===
At the 2010 census, there were 14,520 people, 6,013 households and 3,902 families residing in the city. The population density was 1,083.1 inhabitants per square mile (418.2/km^{2}). There were 6,477 housing units at an average density of 484.3 per square mile (187.0/km^{2}). The racial makeup of the city was 57.02% White, 39.52% African American, 0.21% Native American, 0.64% Asian, 0.06% Pacific Islander, 1.35% from other races, and 1.19% from two or more races. 2.63% of the population were Hispanic or Latino of any race.

There were 6,013 households, of which 27.5% had children under the age of 18 living with them, 42.7% were married couples living together, 18.3% had a female householder with no husband present, and 35.1% were non-families. 31.3% of all households were made up of individuals, and 14.4% had someone living alone who was 65 years of age or older. The average household size was 2.34 and the average family size was 2.92.

23.4% of the population were under the age of 18, 6.8% from 18 to 24, 28.0% from 25 to 44, 23.0% from 45 to 64, and 18.8% who were 65 years of age or older. The median age was 40 years. For every 100 females, there were 84.2 males. For every 100 females age 18 and over, there were 78.0 males.

The median household income was $31,040 and the median family income was $37,553. Males had a median income of $30,745 versus $21,991 for females. The per capita income for the city was $17,414. 15.1% of the population and 11.6% of families were below the poverty line. 23.9% of those under the age of 18 and 14.7% of those 65 and older were living below the poverty line.

== Notable people ==
- Scott Bankhead – MLB pitcher and Olympian in men's baseball at 1984 Summer Olympics
- Winford W. Barrow – U.S. Coast Guard rear admiral
- Na Brown – NFL wide receiver
- Nelson Cole – North Carolina State Representative
- Max Drake – musician
- Jim Duncan – NFL defensive end, college coach, and Canadian Football League coach
- Mike Goodes – PGA Tour Champions golfer
- Ione Grogan – academic, mathematician, educator
- Fultz sisters – set of quadruplets
- Patricia Wright Gwyn – American politician and librarian
- Lindsey Hopkins Sr. – American businessman, financier and philanthropist
- Walter Hooper – American Author, Professor, and advisor to the estate of C. S. Lewis
- Jennifer King – first full-time black female coach in NFL history
- Bill Lindsey – MLB catcher for Chicago White Sox and New York Yankees
- Bryan Mitchell – MLB pitcher for the Yankees, Padres and Marlins
- Mary Lambeth Moore – writer and podcaster
- Janet Paschal – singer, songwriter, author
- H. Jefferson Powell – former Principal Deputy Solicitor General of the U.S., American Lawyer, Professor
- David Settle Reid – governor of North Carolina from 1851 to 1854 and a U.S. Senator
- Tony Rice – bluegrass musician
- R. Stephen Ritchie – the only U.S. Air Force pilot ace of the Vietnam War
- Nick Sacrinty – NFL quarterback
- John Settle – NFL running back and Pro Bowl selection in 1988, college and NFL coach
- Jerome Simpson – NFL wide receiver
- J. Dana Trent – American author, professor, and minister
- Tripp Welborne – NFL safety and punt returner

== Accolades ==
- All-America City Award – 2008
