= Mountain Branch (Aarons Creek tributary) =

Stream in Virginia, USA

Mountain Branch Tributary to Aarons Creek
- Location of Mountain Branch mouth Mountain Branch (Aarons Creek tributary) (the United States)

Location
- Country: United States
- State: Virginia
- County: Halifax

Physical characteristics
- Source: unnamed tributary to Big Mountain Branch divide
  - location: pond about 3 miles northeast of Virgilina, Virginia
  - coordinates: 36°33′54″N 078°44′59″W
  - elevation: 470 ft (140 m)
- Mouth
  - location: about 1.5 miles west of Nelson, Virginia
  - coordinates: 36°33′48″N 078°43′58″W
  - elevation: 358 ft (109 m)
- Length: 0.96 mi (1.54 km)
- Basin size: 0.33 square miles (0.85 km^{2})
- Discharge
  - location: Aarons Creek
  - average: 0.51 cu ft/s (0.014 m^{3}/s) at mouth with Aarons Creek

Basin features
- Progression: Aarons Creek → Dan River → Roanoke River → Albemarle Sound → Pamlico Sound → Atlantic Ocean
- River system: Roanoke River
- Tributaries
  - left: unnamed tributaries
  - right: unnamed tributaries
- Bridges: none

Mountain Branch is a 0.96 mi (1.54 km) long 1st order tributary to Aarons Creek in Halifax County, Virginia.

== Course ==
Mountain Branch rises in a pond about 3 miles northeast of Virgilina, Virginia, and then flows east to join Aarons Creek about 1.5 miles west of Nelson.

== Watershed ==
Mountain Branch drains 0.33 square miles (0.85 km^{2}) of area, receives about 45.5 in/year of precipitation, has a wetness index of 354.52, and is about 40% forested.

== See also ==
- List of Virginia Rivers
