= U.S. Route 64 =

Highway in the United States

U.S. Route 64
- US 64 highlighted in red

Route information
- Length: 2,281 mi (3,671 km)
- Existed: 1926–present

Major junctions
- West end: US 160 at Teec Nos Pos, AZ
- I-25 / US 85 / US 87 near Raton, NM; I-35 at Perry, OK; I-44 at Tulsa, OK; I-40 / US 65 at Conway, AR; I-55 at Marion, AR; I-65 at Pulaski, TN; I-24 near Jasper, TN; I-75 at Chattanooga, TN; I-85 at Lexington, NC; I-95 at Rocky Mount, NC
- East end: US 158 / NC 12 at Whalebone Junction, NC

Location
- Country: United States
- States: Arizona, New Mexico, Oklahoma, Arkansas, Tennessee, North Carolina

Highway system
- United States Numbered Highway System; List; Special; Divided
← US 63	→ US 65

U.S. Route 64 (US 64) is an east–west United States highway that runs for 2,281 miles (3,672 km) from Nags Head in eastern North Carolina to just southwest of the Four Corners in northeast Arizona. The western terminus is at U.S. Route 160 in Teec Nos Pos, Arizona. The highway's eastern terminus is at NC 12 and U.S. Route 158 at Whalebone Junction, North Carolina. Major cities served along US 64's route include Tulsa, Oklahoma; Conway, Arkansas; Memphis and Chattanooga in Tennessee; and Raleigh and Rocky Mount in North Carolina.

== Route description ==
Lengths
	mi	km
AZ	4.16	6.69
NM	425.76	685.19
OK	591.17	951.40
AR	246.35	396.46
TN	404.1	650.3
NC	604	972
Total	2,281	3,671

=== Arizona ===
US 64's western terminus is Teec Nos Pos, Arizona, at US 160. From there, it runs southeast through sparse ranch land for about 4.16 miles (6.69 km) to the New Mexico state line.

=== New Mexico ===
Within New Mexico, US 64 runs through Farmington, Taos, Angel Fire, Eagle Nest, Cimarron, and Raton. As it runs through Raton, it is co-signed with U.S. Route 87. It continues through to Clayton, where US 87 is replaced by U.S. Routes 56 and 412. The three routes then run concurrently into Oklahoma.

It is one of the roads on the Trails of the Ancients Byway, one of the designated New Mexico Scenic Byways. At Angel Fire, US 64 runs past the Vietnam Veterans Memorial State Park.

Although US 64 does not technically cross into Texas, the New Mexico-Texas state line does reach the shoulder of US 64 outside of Clayton at 36.500352°N 103.041922°W.

=== Oklahoma ===
Heading into the Oklahoma Panhandle, the three conjoined routes pick up a fourth two miles (3 km) southwest of Boise City, as US 385 merges from the south. In Boise City, US 385 departs to the north along with U.S. 287, which replaces US 385 in the four-way concurrency on the way out of town to the east, before departing itself to the southeast two miles (3 km) outside of town. Shortly thereafter, US 56 also departs the route, heading northeast into Kansas, while US 64 and US 412 continue their journey due east toward Guymon.

Near Guymon, the route turns due south to approach the town. US 412 then heads due east, while US 64 veers from due south to northeast, joining up with US 54. These two routes remain together for about 20 miles (32 km), splitting at Hooker, with US 54 continuing northeast into Kansas while US 64 again veers due east. At Turpin, US 64 turns left, running north with US 83; three miles (5 km) later, it again turns east, joining US 270 while US 83 and westbound US 270 continue north to Liberal, Kansas. Twenty miles (32 km) to the east, US 270 departs to the south, and US 64 finally runs solo for a significant stretch save for very short concurrencies with US 283 near Rosston, US 183 through Buffalo, and US 281 in Alva.

Near Pond Creek, US 64 turns south, joined by US 60 and US 81. US 64 splits off just north of Enid, jogging through the city before rejoining US 412 on the east side of town. The two routes remain together until they meet Interstate 35, which US 64 joins briefly southbound while US 412 continues east, becoming the Cimarron Turnpike. US 64 departs I-35 at Perry, intersecting the parallel US 77 before continuing east.

On either side of Morrison the route intersects US 177 and US 412 (again) before passing through Pawnee and Cleveland. It then veers southeast, rejoining US 412 yet again to head into Tulsa.

In downtown Tulsa, the route diverges from US 412 for the final time. It briefly (and separately) is concurrent with Interstate 244 and US 75 before bearing southeast through the city while joining OK-51, intersecting Interstate 44 before briefly joining the southernmost five miles (8 km) of US 169, disjoining OK-51 running southbound on the eastern edge of the city. It then proceeds south, crossing the Creek Turnpike, then crosses the Arkansas River in Bixby before turning to the southeast.

After passing through Haskell, US 64 and US 62 meet head-on, north–south; they join and head east toward Muskogee. The routes disengage at the intersection with US 69, with US 64 bearing south out of the center of town. At Warner, the route turns eastward again, where it will run parallel to Interstate 40 for the remainder of its path through Oklahoma. It passes through Webbers Falls, Gore, Vian, Sallisaw (where it has a brief concurrence with US 59), Muldrow, and Roland before leaving the state.

=== Arkansas ===
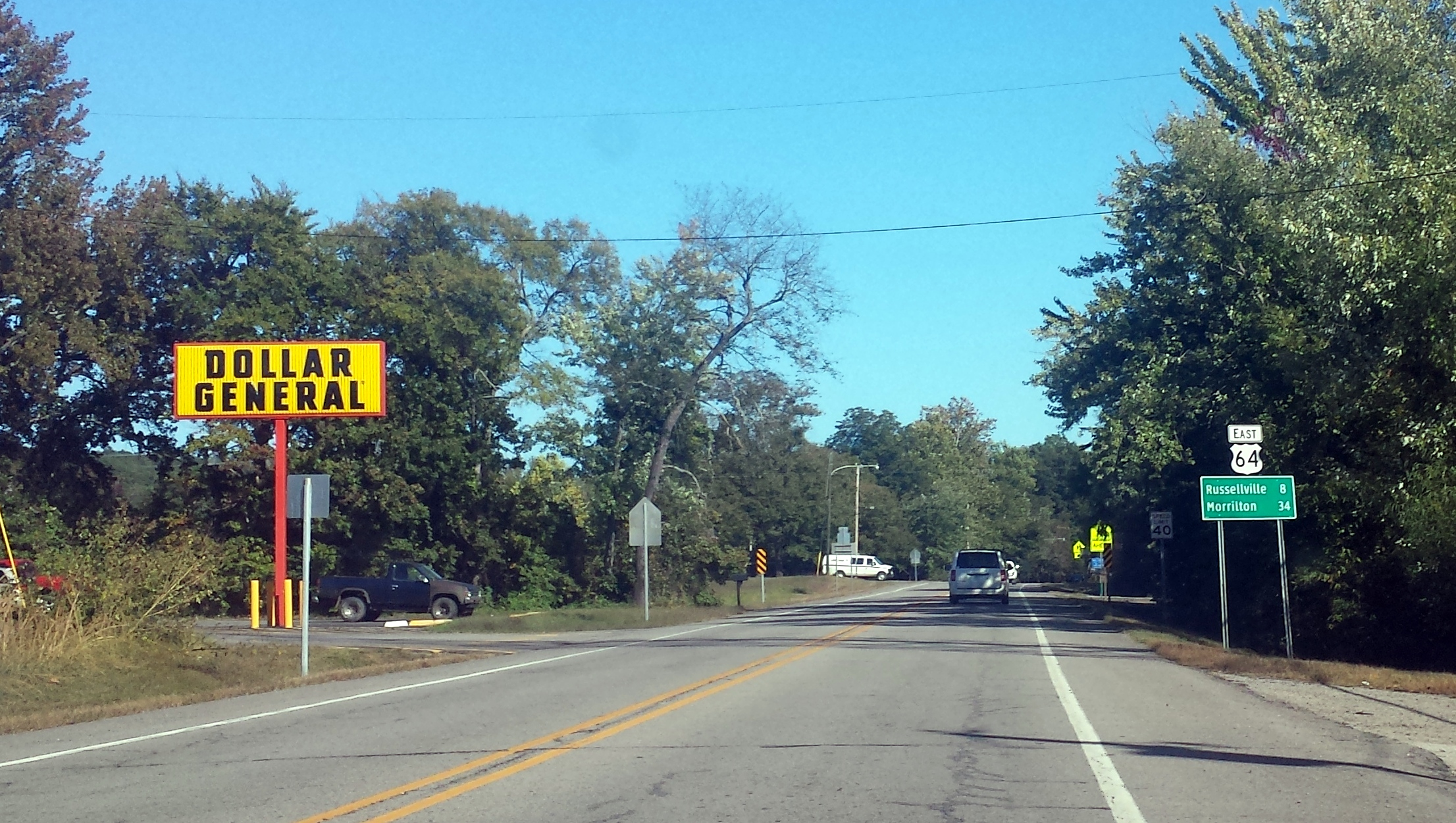
Highway 64 in London, Arkansas

The route enters Arkansas in Fort Smith and crosses the Arkansas River. The route continues following Interstate 40 through Clarksville, Russellville, and Conway, where I-40 turns south and US 64 continues east. US 64 runs with Interstate 57 along with both US 67 and US 167 near Searcy before passing through rural Eastern Arkansas fields. US 64 runs east to Marion and West Memphis, where it meets I-40 and Interstate 55 to continue east over the Mississippi River on the Memphis & Arkansas Bridge to Memphis, Tennessee. A segment of US 64 in Crittenden County is also known as Military Road and is the oldest road in the state. It was surveyed for the removal of Native Tribes known of as the Trail of Tears. A historical marker in Marion notes this information.

=== Tennessee ===
US 64 enters Tennessee on the Memphis-Arkansas Bridge at Memphis. The route shares the bridge with Interstate 55 and U.S. Routes 61, 70, and 79. The route traverses several streets in Memphis before becoming a rural divided highway in eastern Shelby County. The highway runs directly to the east through the county seats of Tennessee's most southern counties. US 64 then continues on past Lawrenceburg, the largest city on the Alabama state line between Memphis and Interstate 65, to Chattanooga. Then US 64 runs from Chattanooga to Cleveland, where it duplexes with US 74 to the North Carolina state line. The Tennessee Department of Transportation is currently working to expand the highway to four lanes across the state. The easternmost portion of the highway in Tennessee is the Ocoee Scenic Byway, a winding, two-lane road through the Ocoee River gorge in Polk County. The steep terrain around the highway is subject to landslides, such as the massive slide in November 2009 that closed the highway for several months.

=== North Carolina ===
US 64 enters North Carolina in Cherokee County, west of Murphy. The highway serves the cities of Brevard, Hendersonville, Rutherfordton, Morganton, Lenoir, Statesville, Lexington, Asheboro, Siler City, Pittsboro, Cary, Raleigh, Rocky Mount, Tarboro, Williamston, and Manteo.

The segment from Franklin to Highlands is a mountainous two-lane road limited to moderate-sized trucks. Large trucks are routed via Truck US 64 (US 23/441 and US 74) to Sylva, and Asheville.

Interstate 40 travels through Statesville on a route originally designed in 1950 as a bypass of US 64, intersecting with Interstate 77 at what was once intended to be a bypass of US 21.

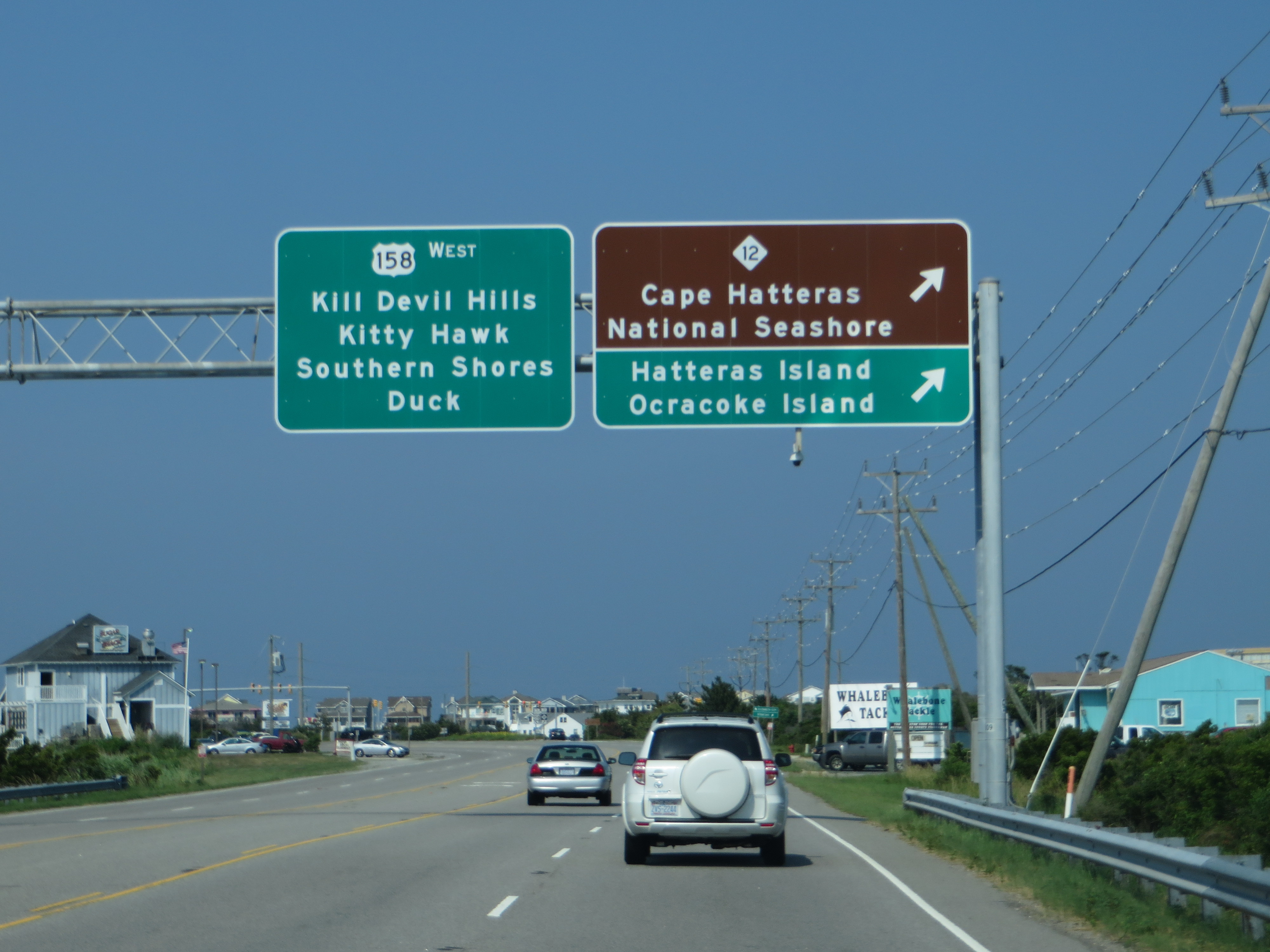
Eastern terminus of US 64 at Nags Head, North Carolina

Within the Raleigh city limits, US 64 follows the southern section of the Beltline. In 2006 a major section known as the Knightdale Bypass opened to ease traffic. After it was completed, US 64 became a divided freeway between Cary and Williamston, and carried at least four lanes between Asheboro and Columbia.

US 64 serves as a gateway to the Outer Banks, ending at Nags Head where it meets U.S. Route 158 and NC 12.

US 64 extends a total of 604 miles (972 km) from the state's western border to the Outer Banks. It is the longest highway in North Carolina; a common way to express coverage of the entire state is to say, "from Murphy to Manteo". US 64 runs through both.

== History ==
U.S. Highway 485
- Location: Santa Fe–Raton, New Mexico
- Existed: 1926–1931

U.S. Route 485 (US 485) was commissioned in 1926, looping west of US 85 between Santa Fe and Raton, New Mexico. In 1931, it became an extension of US 64. In 1959, the Arizona Department of Transportation submitted a proposal to extend US 64 west from Santa Fe, New Mexico to US 89 near Tuba City, Arizona, which was rejected. The portion south of Taos was removed in 1974, when US 64 was realigned and extended to Farmington, and became NM 68.

== Major intersections ==
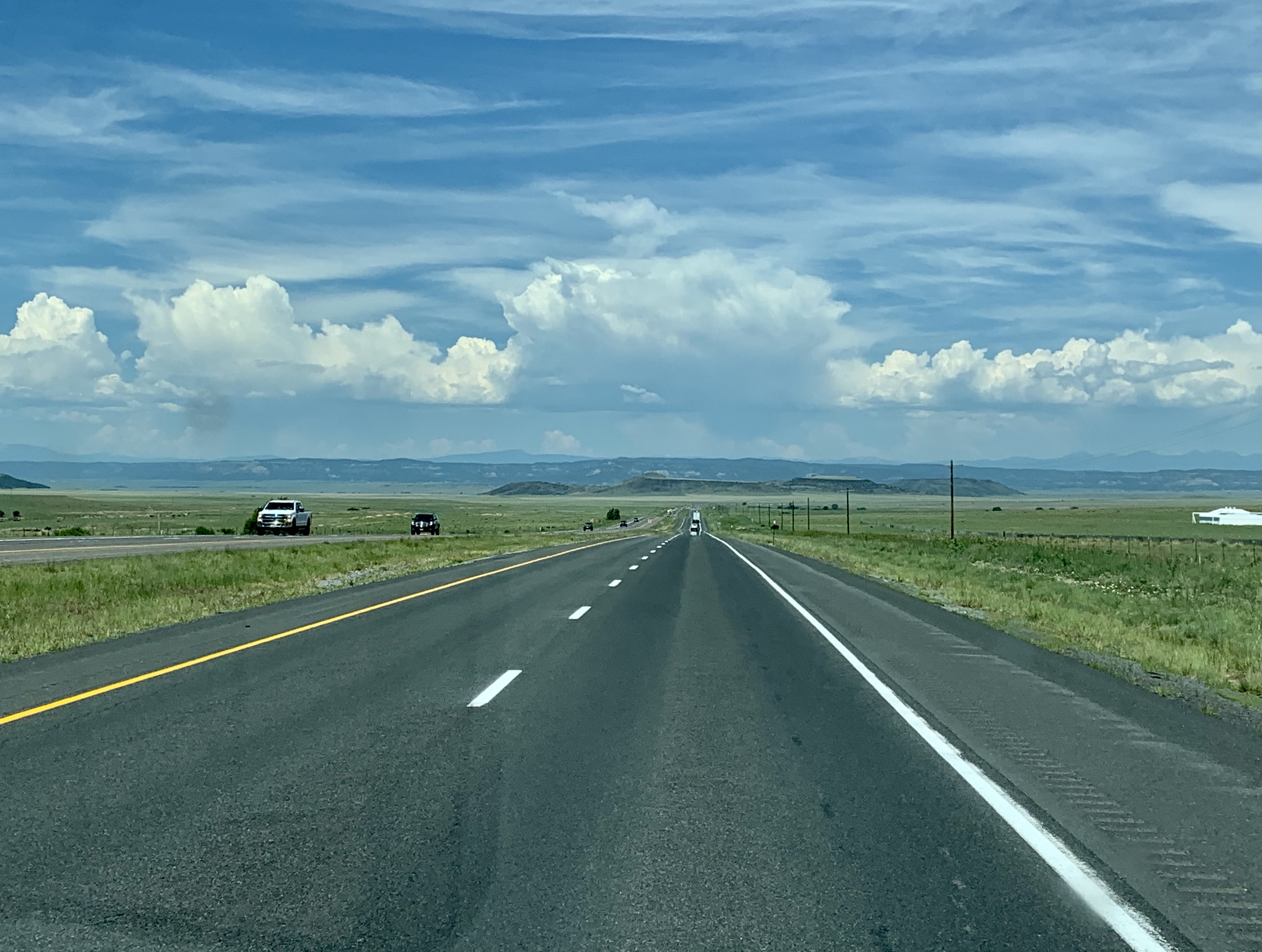
US Route 64 traveling west into Raton, New Mexico.

Arizona
US 160 in Teec Nos Pos
New Mexico
US 491 in Shiprock. The highways travel concurrently through Shiprock.
US 550 in Bloomfield. The highways travel concurrently through Bloomfield.
US 84 east of Monero. The highways travel concurrently to south-southwest of Tierra Amarilla.
US 285 in Tres Piedras
I-25 / US 85 south of Raton. The highways travel concurrently to Raton.
I-25 / US 85 / US 87 in Raton. US 64/US 87 travels concurrently to Clayton.
US 56 / US 87 / US 412 in Clayton. US 56/US 64 travels concurrently to east-northeast of Boise City, Oklahoma. US 64/US 412 travels concurrently to Guymon.
Oklahoma
US 385 southwest of Boise City. The highways travel concurrently to Boise City.
US 287 east of Boise City
US 54 in Guymon. The highways travel concurrently to Hooker.
US 83 in Turpin. The highways travel concurrently to north of Turpin.
US 83 / US 270 north of Turpin. US 64/US 270 travel concurrently to Forgan.
US 283 northwest of Rosston. The highways travel concurrently to east of Rosston.
US 183 in Buffalo. The highways travel concurrently to north-northeast of Buffalo.
US 281 in Alva. The highways travel concurrently through the city.
US 60 / US 81 west of Pond Creek. The highways travel concurrently to the Enid–North Enid city line.
US 412 in Enid. The highways travel concurrently to north-northwest of Perry.
I-35 / US 412 north-northwest of Perry. I-35/US 64 travels concurrently to Perry.
US 77 in Perry. The highways travel concurrently through Perry.
US 177 west-southwest of Morrison
US 412 east of Morrison
US 412 in Westport. The highways travel concurrently to Tulsa.
I-244 / US 75 in Tulsa. The highways travel concurrently through Tulsa.
I-244 / I-444 / US 75 / US 412 in Tulsa. I-444 and US 64 have a hidden concurrency through Tulsa.
I-44 in Tulsa
US 169 in Tulsa. The highways travel concurrently through Tulsa.
US 62 north-northeast of Boynton. The highways travel concurrently to Muskogee.
US 62 / US 69 in Muskogee. The highways travel concurrently through Muskogee.
US 266 in Warner
US 59 in Sallisaw. The highways travel concurrently through Sallisaw.
I-40 in Sallisaw
I-40 south-southwest of Roland
Arkansas
I-540 / US 71 in Van Buren
I-40 in Clarksville
I-40 in Lamar
I-40 in London
I-40 / US 65 in Conway
I-57 / US 67 / US 167 in Beebe. The highways travel concurrently to Bald Knob.
US 49 / US 63 in Fair Oaks
I-55 / US 61 in Marion. The highways travel concurrently to Memphis, Tennessee.
I-40 / US 79 in West Memphis. I-40/US 64 travels concurrently through West Memphis. US 64/US 79 travels concurrently to the Memphis–Bartlett, Tennessee city line.
US 70 in West Memphis. The highways travel concurrently to the Memphis–Bartlett, Tennessee city line.
Tennessee
US 78 in Memphis
US 51 in Memphis. The highways travel concurrently through Memphis.
I-240 in Memphis
US 72 in Memphis
I-40 in Memphis
I-40 on the Memphis–Bartlett city line
I-269 in Eads
US 45 in Selmer. The highways travel concurrently through Selmer.
US 43 in Lawrenceburg
US 31 in Pulaski
I-65 west of Frankewing
US 231 / US 431 in Fayetteville. US 64/US 231 travels concurrently through Fayetteville.
US 41A in Winchester
I-24 southwest of Pelham. The highways travel concurrently to Kimball.
I-24 / US 72 in Kimball. US 64/US 72 travels concurrently to Chattanooga.
US 41 in Jasper. The highways travel concurrently to Chattanooga.
I-24 in Chattanooga
US 11 in Chattanooga. The highways travel concurrently to Cleveland.
US 27 in Chattanooga
I-24 in Chattanooga
US 41 / US 76 in Chattanooga. The highways travel concurrently through Chattanooga.
I-75 in Chattanooga. The highways travel concurrently to north of Collegedale.
US 74 in East Cleveland. The highways travel concurrently to Murphy, North Carolina.
US 411 in Ocoee
North Carolina
US 19 / US 129 southwest of Murphy. The highways travel concurrently to Murphy.
US 23 / US 441 in Franklin. The highways travel concurrently to southeast of Franklin.
US 178 northwest of Rosman
US 276 in Brevard. The highways travel concurrently through Brevard.
I-26 / US 25 / US 74 in Hendersonville
US 221 in Rutherfordton
I-40 in Morganton
US 70 in Morganton. The highways travel concurrently through Morganton.
US 321 in Lenoir
I-40 in Statesville
US 70 in Statesville
US 21 in Statesville. The highways travel concurrently through Statesville.
I-40 in Statesville
I-40 east-northeast of Statesville
I-40 west-northwest of Mocksville
US 601 in Mocksville. The highways travel concurrently through Mocksville.
US 158 / US 601 in Mocksville
US 52 in Lexington
US 29 / US 70 in Lexington. The highways travel concurrently through Lexington.
I-85 east-southeast of Lexington
I-73 / I-74 / US 220 in Asheboro
US 421 in Siler City
US 15 / US 501 north of Pittsboro
NC 540 in Apex
US 1 in Cary. The highways travel concurrently to Raleigh.
I-40 / I-440 / US 1 in Raleigh. I-40/US 64 travels concurrently through Raleigh.
US 70 / US 401 in Raleigh
I-40 / I-440 in Raleigh. I-440/US 64 travels concurrently through Raleigh.
I-87 / I-440 / US 264 in Raleigh. I-87/US 64 travels concurrently east from I-440 to Rolesville Road in Wendell. Future I-87 is slated to continue concurrently with US 64/US 264 in the near future.
I-540 in Knightdale. US 64/US 264 continues concurrently to Zebulon.
US 264 “The 64 Split” in Zebulon. US 64/Future I-87 continues parallel to and north of US 264.
I-95 / Future I-87 in Rocky Mount
US 301 in Rocky Mount
US 258 in Tarboro. The highways travel concurrently to Princeville.
US 13 north of Bethel. The highways travel concurrently to Williamston.
US 17 south of Williamston. The highways travel concurrently for approximately 1.7 miles (2.7 km).
US 264 southwest of Manns Harbor
US 158 / NC 12 in Nags Head

== Special routes ==
=== Alternate routes ===
- US 64A – Franklinville to Ramseur, North Carolina (former)
- US 64A – Brevard, North Carolina (former)
- US 64A – Bat Cave to Morganton, North Carolina (former)
- US 64A – Statesville, North Carolina (former)
- US 64A – Siler City, North Carolina (former)
- ALT US 64 – Spring Hope to Nashville, North Carolina
- US 64A – Rocky Mount, North Carolina (former)
- ALT US 64 – Rocky Mount to Tarboro, North Carolina
- ALT US 64 – Princeville to Williamston, North Carolina
- US 64A – Williamston, North Carolina (former)
- US 64A – Columbia, North Carolina (former)

=== Business routes ===
There are several sections of Business US 64 serving more as alternate routes of the main highway. While they go through towns and cities, they often run numerous miles through rural areas and often pass through more than one city.

- BUS US 64 – Farmington, New Mexico
- US-64 Bus. – Enid, Oklahoma (former)
- US-64 Bus. – Muskogee, Oklahoma
- US 64B – Alma, Arkansas
- US 64B – Vilonia, Arkansas
- US 64C – Beebe, Arkansas (former)
- US 64B – Augusta, Arkansas
- US 64B – Patterson to McCrory, Arkansas
- US 64B – Wynne, Arkansas
- US 64B – Parkin, Arkansas
- US 64B – Earle, Arkansas
- US 64B – Crawfordsville, Arkansas
- BUS US 64 – Whiteville, Tennessee
- BUS US 64 – Selmer, Tennessee
- BUS US 64 – Fayetteville, Tennessee
- BUS US 64 – Winchester, Tennessee
- BUS US 64 – Hayesville, North Carolina
- BUS US 64 (1960–1980) – Brevard, North Carolina (former)
- BUS US 64 (2006–present) – Brevard, North Carolina
- BUS US 64 – Morganton, North Carolina
- BUS US 64 – Statesville, North Carolina (former)
- BUS US 64 – Asheboro, North Carolina
- BUS US 64 – Pittsboro, North Carolina
- BUS US 64 – Raleigh to Zebulon, North Carolina
- BUS US 64 – Nashville, North Carolina
- BUS US 64 – Rocky Mount, North Carolina
- BUS US 64 – Tarboro to Princeville, North Carolina (former)
- BUS US 64 – Williamston, North Carolina (former)
- BUS US 64 – Jamesville, North Carolina
- BUS US 64 – Columbia, North Carolina

=== Bypass routes ===
- APD-40 – Cleveland, Tennessee
- BYP US 64 – Morganton, North Carolina
- US 64 Byp. – Manns Harbor to Manteo, North Carolina

=== Spur routes ===
- US 64S – Wynne, Arkansas

=== Truck routes ===
- TRUCK US 64 – Franklin, North Carolina to Hendersonville, North Carolina

== Photo gallery ==
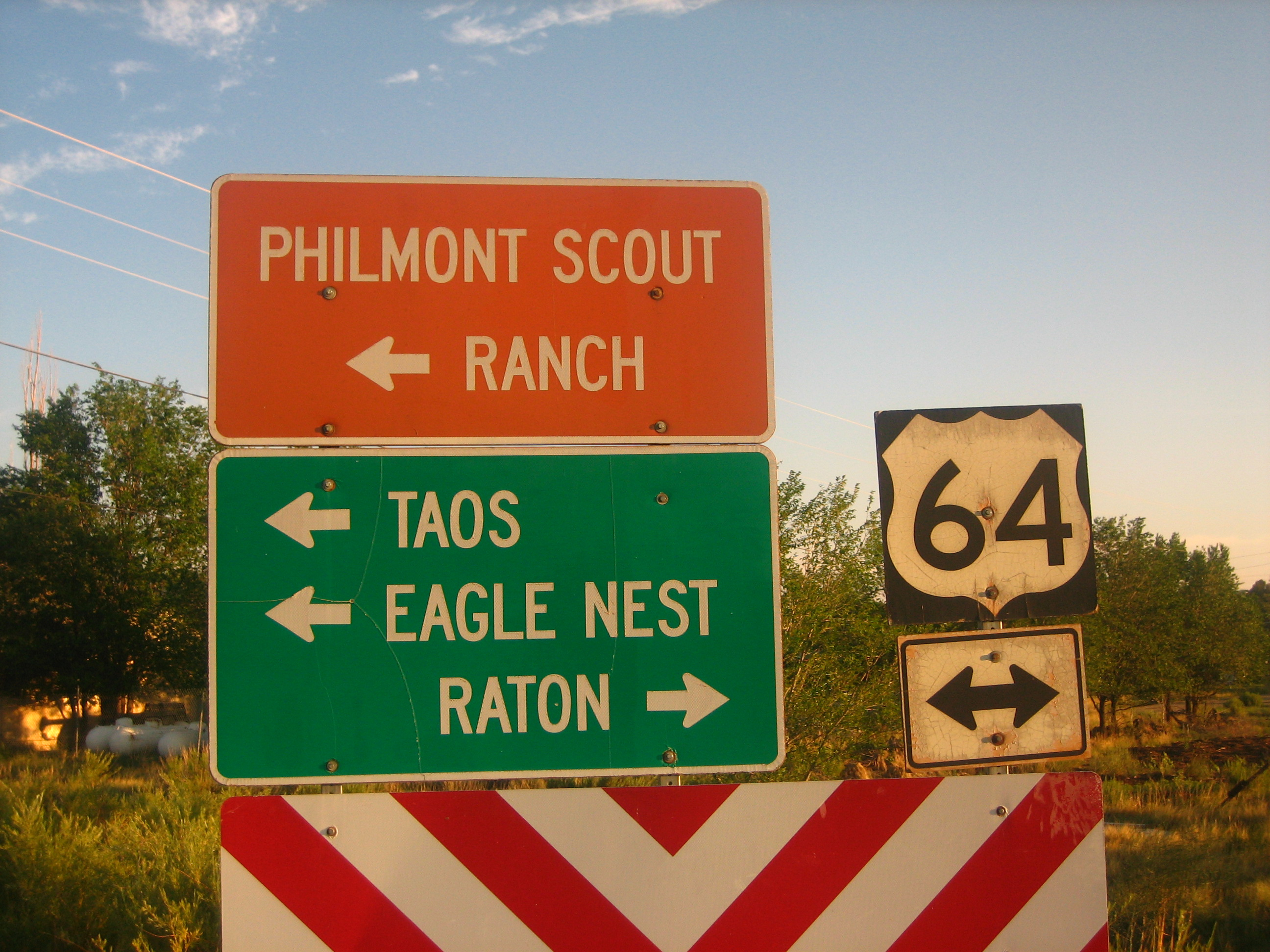
U.S. Route 64 in Cimarron, New Mexico.

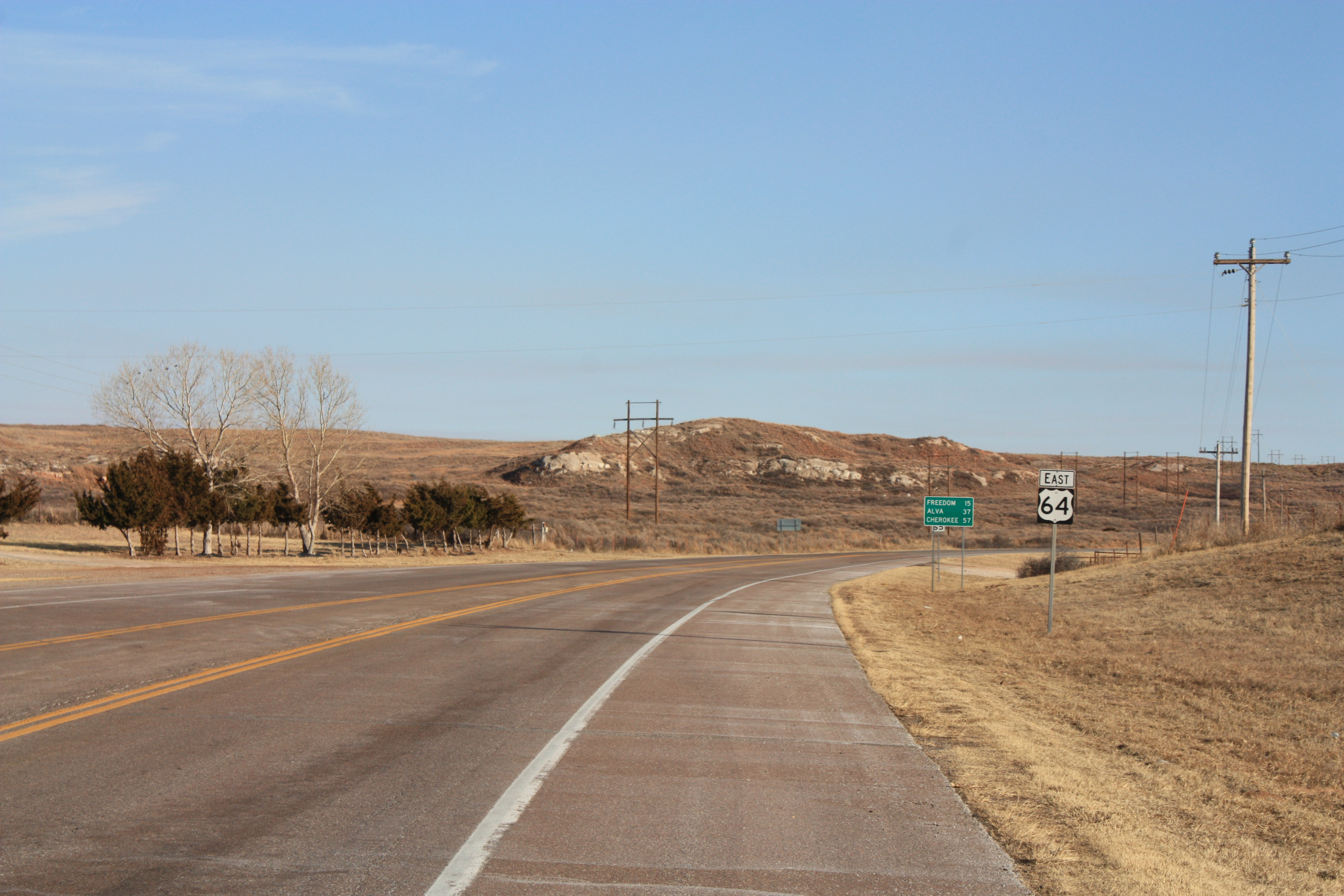
US-64 in Woods County, Oklahoma.

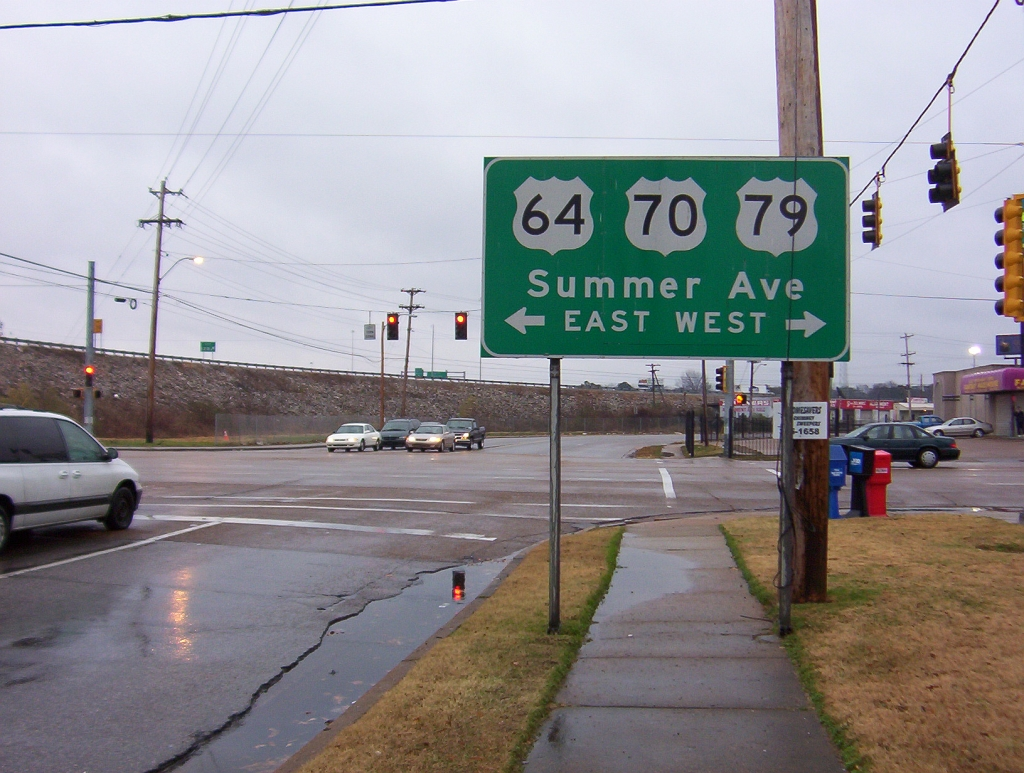
US 64/US 70/US 79 overlap in Memphis, Tennessee (2008).

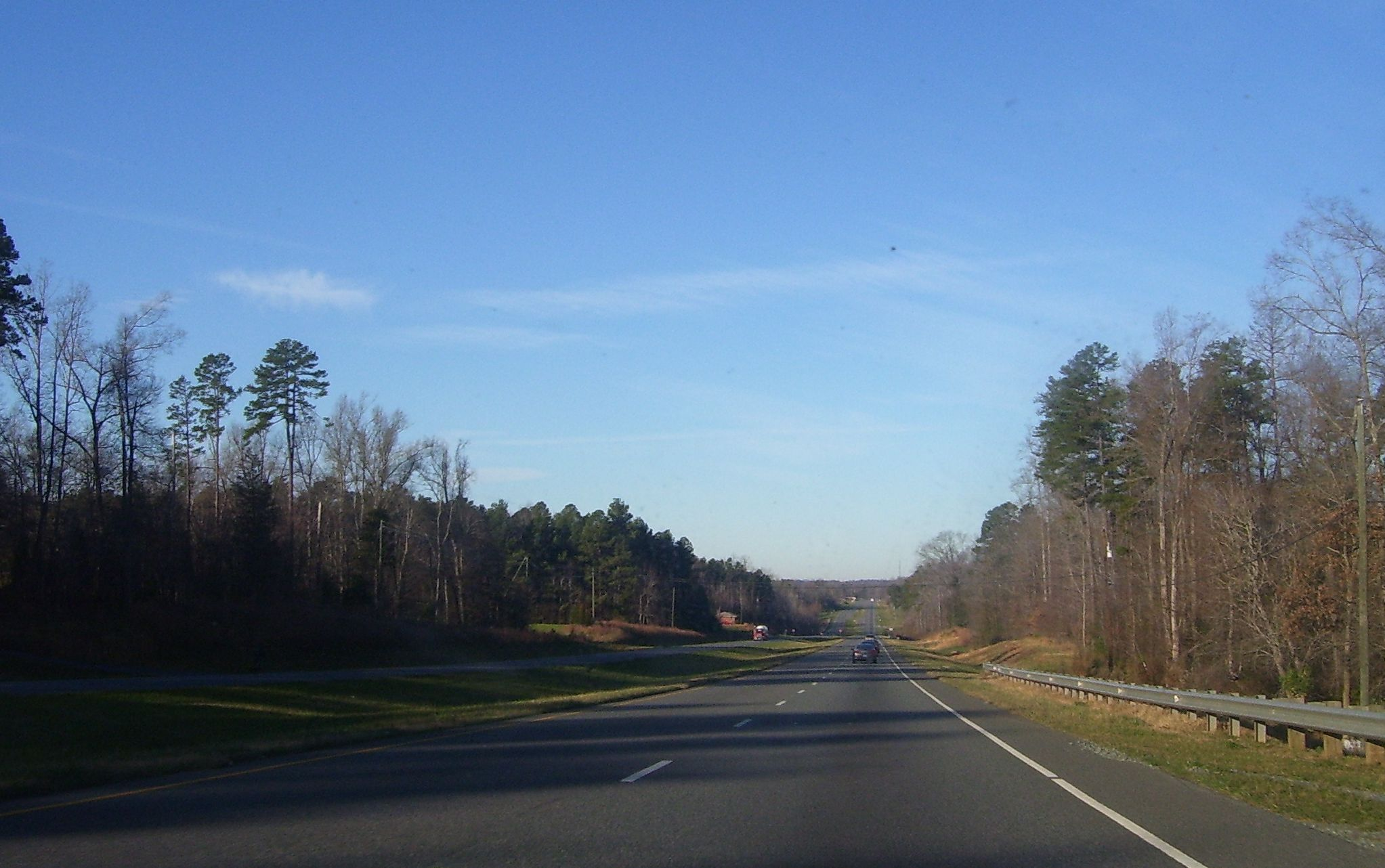
U.S. Route 64 near Siler City, North Carolina.

== See also ==
=== Related routes ===
- U.S. Route 164 (former)
- U.S. Route 264

Browse numbered routes
← SR 63	AZ	→ SR 64
← NM 63	NM	→ NM 65
← SH-63	OK	→ SH-65
