= Crooked Fork (Aarons Creek tributary) =

Stream in North Carolina, USA

Crooked Fork Tributary to Aarons Creek
- Location of Crooked Fork mouth Crooked Fork (Aarons Creek tributary) (the United States)

Location
- Country: United States
- State: Virginia
- Counties: Person; Granville

Physical characteristics
- Source: unnamed tributary to Mayo Creek divide
  - location: about 4 miles southeast of Triple Springs, North Carolina
  - coordinates: 36°27′23″N 078°49′36″W
  - elevation: 610 ft (190 m)
- Mouth
  - location: about 3 miles south of Virgilina, Virginia
  - coordinates: 36°30′04″N 078°46′13″W
  - elevation: 423 ft (129 m)
- Length: 5.43 mi (8.74 km)
- Basin size: 5.17 square miles (13.4 km^{2})
- Discharge
  - location: Aarons Creek
  - average: 6.58 cu ft/s (0.186 m^{3}/s) at mouth with Aarons Creek

Basin features
- Progression: Aarons Creek → Dan River → Roanoke River → Albemarle Sound → Pamlico Sound → Atlantic Ocean
- River system: Roanoke River
- Tributaries
  - left: unnamed tributaries
  - right: unnamed tributaries
- Bridges: Wilsons Creek Road, Faulkner Long Road, Charlie Stovall Road, Shotwell Road

Crooked Fork is a 5.43 mi (8.74 km) long 2nd order tributary to Aarons Creek in Granville County, North Carolina.

== Course ==
Crooked Fork rises about 4 miles southeast of Triple Springs, North Carolina in Person County, and then flows northeast and then turns east to join Aarons Creek about 3 miles south of Virgilina, Virginia.

== Watershed ==
Crooked Fork drains 5.17 square miles (13.4 km^{2}) of area, receives about 46.1 in/year of precipitation, has a wetness index of 410.19, and is about 51% forested.

== See also ==
- List of Virginia Rivers
