= North Fork =

North Fork most commonly refers to the peninsula at the east end of the North Shore of Long Island.

North Fork may also refer to:

== Communities ==
- North Fork, Alberta, Canada

=== United States ===
- North Fork, California, a town in Madera County
- North Fork, California, the former name of Korbel, Humboldt County, California
- North Fork, California, the former name of Seneca, California
- North Fork Township, Stearns County, Minnesota
- North Fork, Missouri, an unincorporated community
- North Fork, Nevada, an unincorporated community in Elko County
- Eden, Utah, also known as North Fork
- Northfork, West Virginia

== Tributaries ==
- North Fork River (Missouri–Arkansas), a tributary of the White River
- North Fork Double Mountain Fork Brazos River, a tributary of the Brazos River in Texas
- North Fork Flathead River, a tributary of the Flathead River in Montana, which delineates the western border of Glacier National Park
- North Fork Gunnison River, a tributary of the Gunnison River in Colorado
- North Fork Creek, a tributary of Redbank Creek in Pennsylvania
- North Fork Red River, a tributary of the Red River of the South
- North Fork (Aarons Creek tributary), a stream in Halifax County, Virginia
- North Fork Skykomish River, a tributary of the Snoqualmie River in Washington state
- North Fork Popo Agie River, a tributary of the Wind River in Wyoming

== Other ==
- Northfork, a 2003 film

== See also ==
- North Fork Dam (disambiguation)
- North Fork River (disambiguation)
- North Forks, New Brunswick, a community in Canada
