= Perkins Branch (Aarons Creek tributary) =

Stream in Virginia, USA

Perkins Branch Tributary to Aarons Creek
- Location of Perkins Branch mouth Perkins Branch (Aarons Creek tributary) (the United States)

Location
- Country: United States
- State: Virginia
- County: Mecklenburg

Physical characteristics
- Source: Buffalo Creek divide
  - location: about 0.25 miles west of Siddon, Virginia
  - coordinates: 36°34′21″N 078°41′11″W
  - elevation: 428 ft (130 m)
- Mouth
  - location: about 1.5 miles north-northwest of Nelson, Virginia
  - coordinates: 36°34′44″N 078°43′00″W
  - elevation: 338 ft (103 m)
- Length: 1.78 mi (2.86 km)
- Basin size: 2.67 square miles (6.9 km^{2})
- Discharge
  - location: Aarons Creek
  - average: 3.30 cu ft/s (0.093 m^{3}/s) at mouth with Aarons Creek

Basin features
- Progression: Aarons Creek → Dan River → Roanoke River → Albemarle Sound → Pamlico Sound → Atlantic Ocean
- River system: Roanoke River
- Tributaries
  - left: unnamed tributaries
  - right: unnamed tributaries
- Bridges: Nelson Church Road

Perkins Branch is a 1.78 mi (2.86 km) long 1st order tributary to Aarons Creek in Mecklenburg County, Virginia.

== Course ==
Perkins Branch rises about 0.25 miles west of Siddon, Virginia, and then flows west to join Aarons Creek about 1.5 miles north-northwest of Nelson.

== Watershed ==
Perkins Branch drains 2.67 square miles (6.9 km^{2}) of area, receives about 45.2 in/year of precipitation, has a wetness index of 460.03, and is about 55% forested.

== See also ==
- List of Virginia Rivers
