= Wolfpit Run (Aarons Creek tributary) =

Stream in Virginia, USA

Wolfpit Run Tributary to Aarons Creek
- Location of Wolfpit Run mouth Wolfpit Run (Aarons Creek tributary) (the United States)

Location
- Country: United States
- State: Virginia
- Counties: Halifax (VA); Granville (NC)

Physical characteristics
- Source: Crooked Fork divide
  - location: about 3 miles south of Virgilina, Virginia
  - coordinates: 36°31′28″N 078°47′09″W
  - elevation: 628 ft (191 m)
- Mouth
  - location: about 2 miles east of Virgilina, Virginia
  - coordinates: 36°33′06″N 078°44′25″W
  - elevation: 358 ft (109 m)
- Length: 4.00 mi (6.44 km)
- Basin size: 4.34 square miles (11.2 km^{2})
- Discharge
  - location: Aarons Creek
  - average: 5.42 cu ft/s (0.153 m^{3}/s) at mouth with Aarons Creek

Basin features
- Progression: Aarons Creek → Dan River → Roanoke River → Albemarle Sound → Pamlico Sound → Atlantic Ocean
- River system: Roanoke River
- Tributaries
  - left: unnamed tributaries
  - right: unnamed tributaries
- Bridges: NC 96, Wolfpit Road, VA 49

Wolfpit Run is a 4.00 mi (6.44 km) long 1st order tributary to Aarons Creek in Halifax County, Virginia.

== Course ==
Wolfpit Run rises about 3 miles south of Virgilina, Virginia in Granville County, North Carolina, and then flows northeast to join Aarons Creek about 2 miles east of Virgilina.

== Watershed ==
Wolfpit Run drains 4.34 square miles (11.2 km^{2}) of area, receives about 45.7 in/year of precipitation, has a wetness index of 420.01, and is about 52% forested.

== See also ==
- List of Virginia Rivers
