= Big Mountain Branch (Aarons Creek tributary) =

Stream in Virginia, USA

Big Mountain Branch Tributary to Aarons Creek
- Location of Big Mountain Branch mouth Big Mountain Branch (Aarons Creek tributary) (the United States)

Location
- Country: United States
- State: Virginia
- County: Halifax

Physical characteristics
- Source: North Fork divide
  - location: Red Bank, Virginia
  - coordinates: 36°35′30″N 078°44′57″W
  - elevation: 490 ft (150 m)
- Mouth
  - location: about 1 mile northwest of Nelson, Virginia
  - coordinates: 36°34′13″N 078°43′52″W
  - elevation: 351 ft (107 m)
- Length: 2.11 mi (3.40 km)
- Basin size: 2.44 square miles (6.3 km^{2})
- Discharge
  - location: Aarons Creek
  - average: 3.09 cu ft/s (0.087 m^{3}/s) at mouth with Aarons Creek

Basin features
- Progression: Aarons Creek → Dan River → Roanoke River → Albemarle Sound → Pamlico Sound → Atlantic Ocean
- River system: Roanoke River
- Tributaries
  - left: unnamed tributaries
  - right: unnamed tributaries
- Bridges: Rip Rap Road, George Phillips Trail

Big Mountain Branch is a 2.11 mi (3.40 km) long 2nd order tributary to Aarons Creek in Halifax County, Virginia.

== Course ==
Big Mountain Branch rises at Red Bank, Virginia, and then flows generally southeast to join Aarons Creek about 1 mile northwest of Nelson.

== Watershed ==
Big Mountain Branch drains 2.44 square miles (6.3 km^{2}) of area, receives about 45.5 in/year of precipitation, has a wetness index of 394.71, and is about 46% forested.

== See also ==
- List of Virginia Rivers
