= List of United States Numbered Highways =

United States Numbered Highway System
- U.S. Highway shields

- Map of the present U.S. Highway network

System information
- Length: 157,724 mi (Note: As of 1989.) (253,832 km)
- Formed: November 11, 1926

Highway names
- US Highways: U.S. Highway nn (US nn); U.S. Route nn (US nn)

System links
- United States Numbered Highway System; List; Special; Divided

United States Numbered Highways are the components of a national system of highways administered by the American Association of State Highway and Transportation Officials (AASHTO), a nonprofit, nonpartisan association, and the various state departments of transportation. These were initially designated on November 11, 1926, and extend throughout the contiguous United States.

There are several U.S. Highways that exist entirely within one state. Since the policy on numbering and designating US Highways was updated in 1991, AASHTO has been in the process of eliminating all intrastate U.S. Highways under 300 miles (480 km) in length, "as rapidly as the State Highway Department and the Standing Committee on Highways of the American Association of State Highway and Transportation Officials can reach agreement with reference thereto"; new additions to the system must therefore serve more than one state.

== List ==
Number	Length (mi) (Note: Changes in endpoints since 1989 are from the American Association of State Highway and Transportation Officials.)	Length (km)	Southern or western terminus	Northern or eastern terminus	Formed	Removed	Notes
US 1	2,369	3,813	Fleming Street in Key West, FL	Route 161 at the Fort Kent–Clair Border Crossing in Fort Kent, ME	1926	current	Follows the East Coast of the United States, longest north-south US Highway
US 2	2,112	3,399	I-5/SR 529 in Everett, WA	I-75 in St. Ignace, MI	1926	current	Western segment
US 2	460	740	US 11 in Rouses Point, NY	I-95 in Houlton, ME	1926	current	Eastern segment
US 3	273	439	Route 2A/Route 3 in Cambridge, MA	Route 257 south of Chartierville, QC	1926	current	
US 4	252.62	406.55	US 9/US 20 in East Greenbush, NY	I-95/Blue Star Turnpike/Spaulding Turnpike/US 1 Byp./NH 16 in Portsmouth, NH	1926	current	Signed north–south in New York
US 5	300	480	I-91 in New Haven, CT	Route 143 at the Canadian border in Derby Line, VT	1926	current	
US 6	3,198.87	5,148.08	US 395 in Bishop, CA	Route 6A in Provincetown, MA	1926	current	Grand Army of the Republic Highway
US 7	309	497	I-95 in Norwalk, CT	I-89 north of Highgate Springs, VT	1926	current	
US 8	281	452	I-35 in Forest Lake, MN	US 2 in Norway, MI	1926	current	
US 9	521	838	US 13 at Laurel, DE	I-87 in Champlain, NY south of the Canadian border	1926	current	Route includes Cape May–Lewes Ferry across the Delaware Bay; New York signs the northern end at a dead-end parking lot just south of the border crossing
US 10	711 (Note: The distance between the junctions at West Fargo and Fargo is 5 miles (8.0 km).)	1,144	I-94/US 52 in West Fargo, ND	I-75/US 23 in Bay City, MI	1926	current	Route includes the SS Badger across Lake Michigan
US 11	1,645 (Note: Via US 11W)	2,647	US 90 in New Orleans, LA	Route 223 at the Rouses Point–Lacolle 223 Border Crossing in Rouses Point, NY	1926	current	
US 12	2,484	3,998	US 101 at Aberdeen, WA	Cass Avenue in Detroit, MI	1926	current	
US 13	526	847	I-95/I-295 north of Fayetteville, NC	US 1 in Falls Township, PA	1926	current	Pennsylvania signs the northern end at US 1, just south of AASHTO's end
US 14	1,398	2,250	US 16/US 20 in Yellowstone National Park, WY	US 41 in Chicago, IL	1926	current	
US 15	792	1,275	US 17 Alt. in Walterboro, SC	I-86/I-99/NY 17/NY 352 in Painted Post, NY	1926	current	
US 16	489	787	US 14/US 20 in Yellowstone National Park, WY	I-90/I-190/US 14/US 16 Truck in Rapid City, SD	1926	current	
US 17	1,189	1,914	US 41 in Punta Gorda, FL	US 11/US 50/US 522 in Winchester, VA	1926	current	
US 17-1	243	391	Wilmington, NC	Petersburg, VA	1926	1932	Replaced by US 117 and US 301
US 18	1,033	1,662	I-25/US 20/US 26/US 87 in Orin, WY	Lincoln Memorial Drive in Milwaukee, WI	1926	current	
US 19	1,386 (Note: Via US 19W)	2,231	US 41 in Memphis, FL	US 20 in Erie, PA	1926	current	
US 20	3,254.49	5,237.59	US 101 in Newport, OR Yellowstone National Park, WY	Yellowstone National Park in West Yellowstone, MT Route 2 in Boston, MA	1926	current	Segments connected by road through Yellowstone National Park
US 21	393	632	Hunting Island State Park, SC	I-81/US 52 in Wytheville, VA	1926	current	
US 22	651	1,048	US 27/US 42/US 52/US 127 in Cincinnati, OH	I-78/US 1-9/Route 21 in Newark, NJ	1926	current	
US 23	1,444	2,324	US 1/US 17 in Jacksonville, FL	I-75 in Mackinaw City, MI	1926	current	Michigan signs the northern end where it merges with I-75, while AASHTO continues it north to the southern end of the Mackinac Bridge
US 24	1,540	2,480	I-70/US 6 north of Minturn, CO	I-75 west of Clarkston, MI	1926	current	
US 25	750 (Note: Via US 25W)	1,210	US 17 in Brunswick, GA	US 42/US 127 at the Ohio state line in Covington, KY	1926	current	
US 26	1,485	2,390	US 101 south of Seaside, OR	I-80/N-61 in Ogallala, NE	1926	current	
US 27	1,364	2,195	US 1 at Miami, FL	I-69/US 24/US 30 at Fort Wayne, IN	1926	current	
US 28	387	623	US 99 in Eugene, OR	US 20 in Ontario, OR	1926	1952	Intrastate, Oregon only; replaced by US 26 & US 126 (now OR 126)
US 29	1,036	1,667	US 90/US 98 at Pensacola, FL	MD 99 at Ellicott City, MD	1926	current	
US 30	3,073	4,946	US 101 in Astoria, OR	Absecon Boulevard & Virginia Avenue in Atlantic City, NJ	1926	current	A majority of the historic Lincoln Highway, one of the first roads across the country, became US 30, from Philadelphia, Pennsylvania, to Granger, Wyoming.
US 31	1,280 (Note: Via US 31W)	2,060	US 90/US 98 in Spanish Fort, AL	I-75 south of Mackinaw City, MI	1926	current	Michigan signs the northern end where it merges with I-75, while AASHTO continues it north to the southern end of the Mackinac Bridge
US 32	511	822	Council Bluffs, IA	Chicago, IL	1926	1934	Replaced by US 6
US 33	703 (Note: The distance between the junctions at South Bend and Elkhart is 17 miles (27 km).)	1,131	US 250/SR 33 at Richmond, VA	US 20 at Elkhart, IN	1937	current	
US 34	1,122	1,806	US 40 at Granby, CO	IL 43 at Berwyn, IL	1926	current	
US 35	424	682	I-64/CR 33 in Teays Valley, WV	US 20 southeast of Michigan City, IN	1934	current	Indiana signs the northern end at US 12
US 36	1,414	2,276	US 34 in Rocky Mountain National Park, CO	US 250/SR 800 in Uhrichsville, OH	1926	current	
US 37	204	328	Chattanooga, TN	Sellersburg, IN	1935	1944	Replaced by US 31E; proposed by AASHTO but rejected by states
US 38	598	962	US 34 in Greeley, CO	20th & Farnam & Harney Streets in Omaha, NE	1926	1931	Replaced by US 6
US 40	2,285.74	3,678.54	I-80/US 189 in Silver Summit, UT	US 322 in Atlantic City, NJ	1926	current	Replaced by I-80 between San Francisco, CA and US 189 north of Park City, UT
US 41	2,006	3,228	US 1 in Miami Beach, FL	Fort Wilkins State Park east of Copper Harbor, MI	1926	current	
US 42	355	571	US 31E/US 60 in Louisville, KY	US 6/US 20/US 322/US 422 in Cleveland, OH	1926	current	Kentucky signs the western end of US 42 at US 31E/US 60, just west of I-65
US 43	410	660	US 90 in Prichard, AL	US 31/US 412 in Columbia, TN	1934	current	Alabama signs the southern end at US 90 north of downtown Mobile
US 44	238	383	US 209/NY 55 in Kerhonkson, NY	Route 3A in Plymouth, MA	1926	current	
US 45	1,297 (Note: Via US 45W)	2,087	US 98 at Mobile, AL	River & Ontonagon streets in Ontonagon, MI	1926	current	Alabama signs the southern end at US 98 west of downtown Mobile
US 46	75.34	121.25	I-80/Route 94 in Columbia, NJ	I-95/US 1-9 at the New York state line	1935	current	Intrastate, New Jersey only
US 48	148	238	I-79/US 33/US 119 at Weston, WV	I-81/SR 55 at Strasburg, VA	2002	current	Temporary route for Corridor H
US 48	67	108	San Jose, CA	French Camp, CA	1926	1931	Intrastate, California only; replaced by US 50
US 48	133	214	Morgantown, WV	Hancock, MD	1975	1989	Replaced by I-68
US 49	516 (Note: Via US 49W)	830	US 90 at Gulfport, MS	US 62/AR 1/AR 139 at Piggott, AR	1926	current	
US 50	3,017	4,855	I-80 in West Sacramento, CA	MD 528 in Ocean City, MD	1926	current	
US 51	1,286	2,070	US 61 in LaPlace, LA	US 2 north of Hurley, WI	1926	current	
US 52	2,072	3,335	Hwy 39 at the Canadian border in Portal, ND	Line Street in Charleston, SC	1926	current	
US 53	403	649	US 14/US 61/WIS 16 at La Crosse, WI	Hwy 71 in Fort Frances, ON	1926	current	
US 54	1,197 (Note: The distance between the old and new termini near Pittsfield is 9 miles (14 km).)	1,926	Loop 375 in El Paso, TX	I-72/US 36/IL 107 in Griggsville, IL	1926	current	Texas signs the western end at a point east of the border crossing
US 55	370	600	US 61 in Davenport, IA	US 12 in Minneapolis, MN	1926	1934	Replaced by US 67, US 52 and US 65
US 56	640	1,030	I-25 BL/US 412/NM 21 at Springer, NM	US 71 at Kansas City, MO	1957	current	Mostly follows the Santa Fe Trail and Cimarron Cutoff
US 57	98.095	157.869	Fed. 57 at Piedras Negras, COA	I-35 southwest of Moore, TX	1970	current	Intrastate, Texas only
US 58	509	819	US 25E at Cumberland Gap, TN	US 60 in Virginia Beach, VA	1931	current	
US 59	1,911	3,075	Fed. 85D at the Mexican border at Laredo, TX	PTH 59 at Canadian border north of Lancaster, MN	1935	current	
US 60	2,670	4,300	I-10 southwest of Brenda, AZ	Harbour Point & Rudee Point Road in Virginia Beach, VA	1926	current	
US 61	1,400	2,300	US 90 in New Orleans, LA	I-35 in Wyoming, MN	1926	current	
US 62	2,248	3,618	US 85 at the Mexican border in El Paso, TX	NY 104 south of the Canadian border in Niagara Falls, NY	1930	current	New York signs the northern (eastern) end in Niagara Falls, northeast of the border crossing; only east–west road to connect Mexico and Canada; Signed north-south in Pennsylvania and New York
US 63	1,286	2,070	I-20/US 167/LA 146 at Ruston, LA	US 2 west of Ashland, WI	1926	current	
US 64	2,326	3,743	US 160 at Teec Nos Pos, AZ	US 158/NC 12 at Whalebone Junction, NC	1926	current	
US 65	969 (Note: The distance between the junctions at Ferriday and Clayton is 6 miles (9.7 km).)	1,559	US 425/LA 15 at Clayton, LA	I-35 at Albert Lea, MN	1926	current	Minnesota signs the northern end at I-35 south of I-90
US 66	2,448	3,940	US 101 Alt. in Santa Monica, CA	US 41 in Chicago, IL	1926	1985	Replaced by I-10, I-15, I-40, I-44, I-55, etc.
US 67	1,560	2,510	Fed. 16 at the Mexican border in Presidio, TX	US 52/IA 64 at Sabula, IA	1926	current	
US 68	560	900	US 62 at Reidland, KY	I-75/SR 15 in Findlay, OH	1926	current	Signed north-south in Ohio
US 69	1,136	1,828	US 96/US 287/SH 87 at Port Arthur, TX	MN 13 in Albert Lea, MN	1926	current	
US 70	2,385	3,838	US 60/SR 77 at Globe, AZ	Seashore Drive & School Drive in Atlantic, NC	1926	current	
US 71	1,532	2,466	US 190 in Krotz Springs, LA	Hwy 71 in Fort Frances, ON	1926	current	
US 72	432	695	US 51/US 64/US 70/US 79 in Memphis, TN	US 41/US 76 in Chattanooga, TN	1926	current	
US 73	112	180	I-70/Kansas Turnpike/US 24/US 40/K-7 in Bonner Springs, KS	US 75 in Dawson, NE	1926	current	
US 74	524	843	I-24/I-75 at Chattanooga, TN	Lumina Avenue in Wrightsville Beach, NC	1926	current	
US 75	1,239	1,994	I-345/Spur 366 at Dallas, TX	Canadian border at Noyes, MN	1926	current	
US 76	547	880	US 41/US 72 in Chattanooga, TN	Water Street in Wrightsville Beach, NC	1926	current	
US 77	1,305	2,100	Fed. 101/Fed. 180 at the Mexican border in Brownsville, TX	I-29 at Sioux City, IA	1926	current	
US 78	843.3	1,357.2	I-57/US 67/AR 226 west of Cash, AR	Line Street in Charleston, SC	1926	current	
US 79	873	1,405	I-35 in Round Rock, TX	US 68/US 68 Bus./KY 80 in Russellville, KY	1935	current	Texas signs the southern end at I-35 at Round Rock, north of Austin
US 80	1,032	1,661	I-30/US 67 on the Dallas–Mesquite city line, TX	SR 26 Butler Avenue Inlet Avenue Tybrisa Street in Tybee Island, GA	1926	current	
US 81	1,234	1,986	I-35W/US 287 at Fort Worth, TX	I-29/PTH 75 at the Pembina–Emerson Border Crossing north of Pembina, ND	1926	current	
US 82	1,680	2,700	US 54/US 70 at Alamogordo, NM	I-95/US 17/SR 25/SR 520 at Brunswick, GA	1932	current	
US 83	1,894	3,048	Fed. 101/Fed. 180 at the Mexican border in Brownsville, TX	PTH 83 at the Canadian border north of Westhope, ND	1926	current	
US 84	1,919	3,088	US 160 at Pagosa Springs, CO	I-95/SR 38 east of Midway, GA	1926	current	
US 85	1,479	2,380	US 62 at the Stanton Street Bridge at the Mexican border in El Paso, TX	Highway 35 at the Canadian border north of Fortuna, ND	1926	current	
US 87	2,005	3,227	SH 238 in Port Lavaca, TX	US 2 at West Havre, MT	1926	current	Concurrent and unsigned with I-25 through all of Colorado and part of New Mexico
US 89	1,247	2,007	BL 40/US 180 in Flagstaff, AZ Yellowstone National Park, WY	Yellowstone National Park, WY Highway 2 at the Canadian border north of Babb, MT	1926	current	Segments connected by road through Yellowstone National Park
US 90	1,633	2,628	I-10 BL in Van Horn, TX	SR A1A in Jacksonville Beach, FL	1926	current	Follows the Gulf Coast of the US
US 91	163	262	I-15/I-84 in Brigham City, UT	I-15 BL/US 26 in Idaho Falls, ID	1926	current	
US 92	177	285	US 19 Alt./SR 687 in St. Petersburg, FL	SR A1A in Daytona Beach, FL	1926	current	Intrastate, Florida only
US 93	1,346	2,166	US 60 in Wickenburg, AZ	Highway 93 at the Canadian border at the Port of Roosville north of Eureka, MT	1926	current	
US 94	110	180	Naples, FL	Miami, FL	1926	1949	Intrastate, Florida only; replaced by US 41
US 95	1,574	2,533	Calle 1 at the Mexican border in San Luis, AZ	Highway 95 at the Canadian border in Eastport, ID	1926	current	
US 96	170	270	US 69/US 287/SH 87 in Port Arthur, TX	Future I-69/Future I-369/US 59/US 84 in Tenaha, TX	1939	current	Intrastate, Texas only; north-south while even numbered routes are east-west
US 96	403	649	Laredo, TX	Houston, TX	1926	1939	Intrastate, Texas only; replaced by US 59
US 97	663	1,067	I-5 in Weed, CA	Highway 97 at the Canadian border north of Oroville, WA	1926	current	
US 98	939	1,511	US 84 in Bude, MS	SR A1A/SR 80 in Palm Beach, FL	1933	current	Mississippi records indicate the western end is at US 84 in Bude, although there are US 98 shields as far west as Natchez; Florida signs US 98 east of US 1, ending at SR A1A
US 99	1,600	2,600	Mexican border at Calexico, CA	Canadian border at Blaine, WA	1926	1972	Replaced by I-5 and SR 99
US 101	1,519	2,445	I-5/I-10 in Los Angeles, CA	I-5 in Tumwater, WA	1926	current	Follows the West Coast of the United States
US 102	36	58	US 2 in Crystal Falls, MI	US 41 near Covington, MI	1926	1928	Intrastate, Michigan only; first US Highway designation to be decommissioned; replaced by US 141
US 104	167	269	Niagara Falls, NY	East of Mexico, NY	1934	1971	Intrastate, New York only; redesignated NY 104
US 106	95	153	Wyalusing, PA	Narrowsburg, NY	1926	1973	Redesignated PA 106
US 109	214	344	New York, NY	Glens Falls, NY	1926	—	Intrastate, New York only; replaced by US 9; not in revised numbering plan
US 110	40	64	Oshkosh, WI	Fremont, WI	1926	1938	Intrastate, Wisconsin only; redesignated WIS 110
US 111	254	409	Baltimore, MD	Lemoyne, PA	1926	1963	Replaced by I-83 and MD 45
US 112	207	333	US 12 in New Buffalo, MI	US 10/US 12/US 16/ US 25 in Detroit, MI	1926	1961	Intrastate, Michigan only; replaced by US 12
US 113	73	117	US 13 in Pocomoke City, MD	DE 1 in Milford, DE	1926	current	
US 116	158	254	Cody, WY	Ucross, WY	1926	1934	Intrastate, Wyoming only; replaced by US 14 and US 14A
US 117	114 (Note: The length of the old alignment near Wilmington is 8.5 miles (13.7 km).)	183	Port of Wilmington	US 301 south of Wilson, NC	1932	current	Intrastate, North Carolina only
US 117	159	256	Norlina, NC	Virginia Beach, VA	1926	1932	Replaced by US 58 and US 158
US 118	35	56	Dickeyville, WI	Dodgeville, WI	1926	1937	Intrastate, Wisconsin only; replaced by US 151
US 119	585	941	US 25E in Pineville, KY	US 219 in Sandy Township, PA	1926	current	
US 120	447	719	Erie, PA	Philadelphia, PA	1926	1967	Intrastate, Pennsylvania only; redesignated PA 120
US 121	112 (Note: The Virginia mileage is not given in the AASHTO reports, but is given by the Virginia Department of Transportation.)	180	US 23 in Pound, VA	I-64/I-77 in Beckley, WV	proposed	—	Proposed highway; short, completed portion in West Virginia currently signed WV 121
US 121	107	172	Lexington, NC	Max Meadows, VA	1926	1934	Replaced by US 52
US 122	165	266	Haverstraw, NY	Wilmington, DE	1926	1934	Replaced by US 202
US 122	128	206	Oxford, PA	Northumberland, PA	1935	1963	Intrastate, Pennsylvania only; redesignated PA 61
US 123	75 (Note: The new length in Georgia is 17 miles (27 km).)	121	US 23/US 441/SR 15/SR 365 east of Clarkesville, GA	I-385 Bus. in Greenville, SC	1937	current	
US 123	96	154	Jenkins, KY	Middlesboro, KY	1930	1934	Intrastate, Kentucky only; replaced by US 119
US 124	80	130	Biggsville, IL	Peoria, IL	1926	1938	Redesignated IL 116
US 126	131	211	Eugene, OR	Prineville, OR	1952	1972	Intrastate, Oregon only; redesignated OR 126
US 127	758	1,220	US 27 in Chattanooga, TN	I-75 south of Grayling, MI	1926	current	Tennessee signs the southern end at US 27 north of Chattanooga
US 129	582	937	US 19/US 27 Alt./US 98 in Chiefland, FL	I-40 in Knoxville, TN	1926	current	
US 130	83	134	I-295/NJ Turnpike/US 40/Route 49 in Pennsville Township, NJ	US 1/Route 171 in New Brunswick, NJ	1926	current	Intrastate, New Jersey only
US 131	271	436	I-80/I-90/Indiana Toll Road/SR 13 in Middlebury, IN	US 31 in Petoskey, MI	1926	current	
US 136	744	1,197	US 6/US 34 in Edison, NE	I-74/I-465 in Speedway, IN	1951	current	Formerly continued into Indianapolis to end at US 421
US 138	72	116	US 6/SH 14 in Sterling, CO	US 30 north of Big Springs, NE	1926	current	
US 140	54	87	Gettysburg, PA	Baltimore, MD	1926	1979	Replaced by MD 140, MD 97 and PA 97
US 141	176	283	I-43 in Bellevue, WI	US 41/M-28 northeast of Covington, MI	1926	current	
US 143	226	364	Jackson, TN	Glasgow, KY	1935	1944	Replaced by US 31E; proposed by AASHTO but rejected by states
US 150	571	919	US 6 in Moline, IL	US 25/KY 1249 in Mount Vernon, KY	1926	current	
US 151	337	542	I-80 north of Williamsburg, IA	I-43/WIS 42 in Manitowoc, WI	1926	current	
US 152	176	283	Indianapolis, IN	Whiting, IN	1934	1938	Intrastate, Indiana only; replaced by US 231
US 154	36	58	Dodge City, KS	Mullinville, KS	1926	1982	Intrastate, Kansas only; redesignated K-154 (now US 400)
US 156	101	163	Garden City, KS	Ellsworth, KS	1957	1982	Intrastate, Kansas only; redesignated K-156
US 158	347	558	US 64/US 601 in Mocksville, NC	US 64/NC 12 at Whalebone Junction, NC	1932	current	Intrastate, North Carolina only
US 159	85	137	US 59/K-4 Alt. in Nortonville, KS	US 59 west of New Point, MO	1935	current	
US 160	1,464	2,356	US 89 west of Tuba City, AZ	Future I-57/US 67/Route 158 southwest of Poplar Bluff, MO	1930	current	
US 161	185	298	US 61 in Keokuk, IA	US 61 in Key West, IA	1926	1934	Intrastate, Iowa only; replaced by US 151 and US 218
US 163	60	97	US 69 in Des Moines, IA	US 63 in Oskaloosa, IA	1934	1937	Intrastate, Iowa only; redesignated Iowa 163
US 163	64	103	US 160/BIA Route 591 in Kayenta, AZ	US 191 in Bluff, UT	1971	current	
US 164	252	406	Enid, OK	Amarillo, TX	1928	1930	Replaced by US 60
US 164	274	441	Cortez, CO	Flagstaff, AZ	1966	1970	Replaced by US 160
US 165	412	663	US 90 in Iowa, LA	US 70 in North Little Rock, AR	1926	current	
US 166	166	267	US 81 in South Haven, KS	I-44/US 400 in Joplin, MO	1926	current	
US 167	499	803	LA 14 Bus. in Abbeville, LA	US 62/US 412 in Ash Flat, AR	1926	current	
US 168	137	220	Louisville, KY	Mount Vernon, KY	1926	1934	Intrastate, Kentucky only; replaced by US 150
US 169	975	1,569	US 64 in Tulsa, OK	US 53 in Virginia, MN	1930	current	
US 170	215	346	Charlotte, NC	Lynchburg, VA	1926	1931	Replaced by US 29
US 171	179	288	US 90/LA 14 in Lake Charles, LA	US 79/US 80/LA 3094 in Shreveport, LA	1926	current	Intrastate, Louisiana only
US 175	114	183	I-45 in Dallas, TX	US 69 in Jacksonville, TX	1931	current	Intrastate, Texas only; Texas signs the western (northern) end at I-45 north of AASHTO's end
US 176	229	369	US 25 Bus./NC 225 in Hendersonville, NC	US 52 in Goose Creek, SC	1926	current	
US 177	233	375	US 70/SH 199 in Madill, OK	US 81 in South Haven, KS	1927	current	
US 178	237	381	US 64 west of Rosman, NC	US 78 northwest of Ridgeville, SC	1932	current	
US 180	1,127	1,814	SR 64 at Valle, AZ	I-20 at Hudson Oaks, TX	1943	current	
US 180	336	541	Caballo, NM	Near Queen Valley, AZ	1926	1935	Replaced by US 70
US 181	136.76	220.09	I-37/SH 35 in Corpus Christi, TX	I-37 in San Antonio, TX	1926	current	Intrastate, Texas only; AASHTO says the northern terminus is at the northern end of I-37
US 183	1,035	1,666	US 77 in Refugio, TX	I-90 in Presho, SD	1930	current	
US 185	124	200	Casper, WY	Cheyenne, WY	1926	1934	Intrastate, Wyoming only; replaced by US 87
US 187	207	333	Rock Springs, WY	US 26/US 89/US 191/ US 287 northeast of Jackson, WY	1926	1982	Intrastate, Wyoming only; Wyoming does not sign US 187, but it appears in the 1989 log, completely concurrent with US 191 except for a short piece in Rock Springs
US 189	322	518	I-15 in Provo, UT	US 26/US 89/US 191 in Jackson, WY	1938	current	Utah did not sign US 189 north of US 40 at Heber City until 2017; unsigned along I-80 concurrency
US 189	30	48	Nephi, UT	Pigeon Hollow Junction, UT	1928	1938	Redesignated SR 132
US 190	875	1,408	I-10 at Iraan, TX	US 90 at Slidell, LA	1926	current	
US 191	1,657 (Note: The distance between the junctions at Chambers and Sanders is 6 miles (9.7 km).)	2,667	SR 80 in Douglas, AZ Yellowstone National Park in West Yellowstone, MT	Yellowstone National Park, WY Highway 4 at the Canadian border north of Loring, MT	1926	current	Segments connected by road through Yellowstone National Park
US 192	75	121	US 27 in Four Corners, FL	SR A1A in Indialantic, FL	1926	current	Intrastate, Florida only
US 195	95	153	US 95 north of Lewiston, ID	I-90/US 2/US 395 in Spokane, WA	1926	current	
US 197	64	103	US 97 southwest of Shaniko, OR	SR 14 in Dallesport, WA	1952	current	
US 199	80	130	US 101 in Crescent City, CA	I-5 in Grants Pass, OR	1926	current	
US 201	157	253	US 1/SR 24 Bus. in Brunswick, ME	SR 6/Route 173 at the Canadian border southeast of Saint-Theophile, QC	1926	current	Intrastate, Maine only
US 202	627	1,009	US 13/US 40/DE 141 in New Castle, DE	I-395/SR 9/SR 15 in Bangor, ME	1934	current	Maine signs the northern end at US 2 in Bangor
US 206	131	211	US 30/Route 54 in Hammonton, NJ	US 209 in Dingman Township, PA	1934	current	
US 209	217	349	PA 147 in Millersburg, PA	US 9W/NY 199 in Ulster, NY	1926	current	
US 210	127	204	Motley, MN	Carlton, MN	1926	1972	Intrastate, Minnesota only; redesignated MN 210
US 211	61	98	I-81/SR 211 in New Market, VA	US 15 Bus./US 29 Bus./US 211 Bus./ in Warrenton, VA	1926	current	Intrastate, Virginia only
US 212	952	1,532	Yellowstone National Park, WY	US 169/MN 62 in Eden Prairie, MN	1926	current	
US 213	156	251	Elkton, MD	Ocean City, MD	1926	1973	Intrastate, Maryland only; redesignated MD 213
US 216	130	210	Rapid City, SD	Moorcroft, WY	1930	1934	Replaced by US 16; old US 16 replaced by US 14
US 217	165	266	Wilson, NC	Pee Dee, SC	1926	1932	Replaced by US 301
US 218	319	513	US 136 at Keokuk, IA	I-35/US 14 at Owatonna, MN	1926	current	
US 219	535	861	US 460 in Rich Creek, VA	I-90/New York Thruway in West Seneca, NY	1926	current	
US 220	681	1,096	US 1 in Rockingham, NC	I-86/NY 17/Southern Tier Expressway at the PA-NY state line in South Waverly, PA	1926	current	
US 221	734	1,181	US 19/US 27 Alt./US 98/SR 55 in Perry, FL	US 29 Bus./US 460 Bus./US 501 Bus. in Lynchburg, VA	1930	current	
US 222	109	175	US 1 in Conowingo, MD	I-78/PA 222/PA 309 in Dorneyville, PA	1926	current	
US 223	46.34	74.58	US 23/SR 51/SR 184 in Sylvania, OH	US 127 southeast of Somerset, MI	1930	current	
US 224	287	462	US 24/SR 5/SR 9 at Huntington, IN	US 422 Bus./PA 18 at New Castle, PA	1933	current	
US 227	120	190	Carrollton, KY	Richmond, KY	1928	1972	Intrastate, Kentucky only
US 230	40	64	Harrisburg, PA	Lancaster, PA	1926	1966	Intrastate, Pennsylvania only; redesignated PA 230
US 231	912	1,468	6th Street in Panama City, FL	US 41 at St. John, IN	1926	current	
US 240	118	190	Lemoyne, PA	Arlington County, VA	1926	1971	
US 241	81	130	Hopkinsville, KY	Nashville, TN	1926	1930	Replaced by US 41
US 241	378	608	Murfreesboro, TN	Dothan, AL	1930	1954	Replaced by US 431
US 250	391	629	Fredericksburg, VA	Lee Hill, VA	1926	—	Replaced by US 50S; not in revised numbering plan
US 250	514	827	US 6 in Sandusky, OH	US 360 in Richmond, VA	1926	current	
US 258	217	349	US 17 Bus./NC 24 Bus. in Jacksonville, NC	SR 143 at Fort Monroe in Hampton, VA	1932	current	
US 259	250	400	Future I-69/Future I-69 BL/US 59/US 59 Bus. in Nacogdoches, TX	US 59/US 270 south of Heavener, OK	1963	current	
US 260	298	480	Deming, NM	Holbrook, AZ	1931	1962	Replaced by US 180
US 264	219	352	I-87/I-440/US 64/US 64 Bus. in Raleigh, NC	US 64 in Manns Harbor, NC	1932	current	Intrastate, North Carolina only
US 266	43.09	69.35	US 62/US 75 in Henryetta, OK	US 64/SH-2 in Warner, OK	1926	current	Intrastate, Oklahoma only
US 270	643	1,035	US 54/US 83 in Liberal, KS	I-530/US 65 at White Hall, AR	1930	current	
US 270	65	105	Sparta, TN	Murfreesboro, TN	1926	1929	Intrastate, Tennessee only; replaced by US 70S
US 271	299	481	SH 31/SH 155 in Tyler, TX	US 71 Bus./AR 255 in Fort Smith, AR	1926	current	
US 275	266	428	US 136 northwest of Rock Port, MO	US 20/US 281 in O'Neill, NE	1931	current	
US 276	108	174	I-185/I-385 southeast of Mauldin, SC	I-40 in Cove Creek, NC	1932	current	
US 277	633	1,019	US 83 in Carrizo Springs, TX	I-44/US 62 in Newcastle, OK	1928	current	
US 278	1,077	1,733	US 59/US 71 in Wickes, AR	US 278 Bus. in Hilton Head Island, SC	1952	current	
US 280	392	631	I-20/I-59/US 31 in Birmingham, AL	US 80/SR 26/SR 30 in Blitchton, GA	1954	current	
US 281	1,875	3,018	US 77 Bus./SH 48 in Brownsville, TX	ND 3/PTH 10 at the Canadian border north of Dunseith, ND	1931	current	
US 283	730	1,170	US 87 northwest of Brady, TX	US 30 in Lexington, NE	1931	current	
US 285	835	1,344	US 90 in Sanderson, TX	I-25/US 87/SH 30 in Denver, CO	1934	current	
US 285	133	214	Laramie, WY	Denver, CO	1926	1934	Replaced by US 287
US 287	1,791	2,882	US 69/US 96/SH 87 in Port Arthur, TX Yellowstone National Park in West Yellowstone, MT	Yellowstone National Park, WY US 89 in Choteau, MT	1934	current	Segments connected by road through Yellowstone National Park
US 290	276	444	I-10 southeast of Segovia, TX	I-610 in Houston, TX	1926	current	Intrastate, Texas only
US 295	45	72	US 12 west of Pomeroy, WA	US 195 in Colfax, WA	1926	1968	Intrastate, Washington only; redesignated SR 127
US 299	295	475	Alturas, CA	Arcata, CA	1934	1964	Intrastate, California only; redesignated SR 299
US 301	120	190	US 1 in Lee Hall, VA	Fredericksburg, VA	1926	—	Replaced by US 17; not in revised numbering plan
US 301	1,111	1,788	US 41 in Sarasota, FL	DE 1 in Biddles Corner, DE	1932	current	
US 302	171	275	US 2 in Montpelier, VT	I-295/US 1/SR 100 in Portland, ME	1935	current	Maine signs the eastern end along US 1 several blocks south of I-295
US 309	214	344	Philadelphia, PA	South Waverly, PA	1926	1967	Intrastate, Pennsylvania only; redesignated PA 309
US 310	108	174	US 14/US 16/US 20/WYO 789 in Greybull, WY	I-90 BL/S-532 in Laurel, MT	1926	current	Wyoming signs the eastern (southern) end where AASHTO has it join US 14/US 16/US 20 west of Greybull
US 311	59.2	95.3	I-74 in Walkertown NC	US 58/US 58 Bus. in Bachelors Hall, VA	1926	current	
US 312	234	377	Broadus, MT	Yellowstone National Park	1960	1981	Intrastate, Montana only; redesignated MT 59
US 319	318	512	US 98 in Apalachicola, FL	US 1/SR 4/SR 78 in Wadley, GA	1933	current	
US 320	26	42	Shoshoni, WY	Riverton, WY	1926	1939	Replaced by US 26
US 321	526	847	US 17 in Hardeeville, SC	I-40/SR 73/SR 95 northwest of Lenoir City, TN	1930	current	
US 322	494	795	US 6/US 20 at Public Square in Cleveland, OH	US 40 Atlantic Avenue & Pacific Avenue in Atlantic City, NJ	1926	current	
US 330	161	259	Lynwood, IL	Galt, IL	1926	1942	Redesignated IL 38
US 331	151	243	US 98/SR 30/SR 83 southeast of Santa Rosa Beach, FL	US 80/US 82/SR 6/SR 8/SR 9/SR 21 in Montgomery, AL	1953	current	
US 331	45	72	Flomaton, AL	Pensacola, FL	1926	1936	Replaced by US 29
US 340	156	251	US 11 in Greenville, VA	US 15/US 40/Jefferson Street in Frederick, MD	1926	current	
US 341	226	364	US 17/SR 25/SR 27 in Brunswick, GA	US 41/SR 7/SR 18 in Barnesville, GA	1926	current	Intrastate, Georgia only
US 350	80	130	US 160 northeast of Trinidad, CO	US 50 in La Junta, CO	1926	current	Intrastate, Colorado only; Colorado signs the western end at US 160 northeast of Trinidad
US 360	223	359	US 58 Bus./SR 293/SR 360 in Danville, VA	SR 644 in Reedville, VA	1933	current	Intrastate, Virginia only
US 366	437	703	Amarillo, TX	El Paso, TX	1926	1931	Replaced by US 54, US 70, US 60, and US 84
US 366	73	117	Willard, NM	Albuquerque, NM	1931	1939	Replaced by US 66 (now I-40), NM 41 and NM 333
US 370	289	465	Bowie, TX	Amarillo, TX	1926	1939	Replaced by US 287
US 371	246	396	I-49/LA 177 at Evelyn, LA	US 59/US 70/US 71/AR 41 in De Queen, AR	1994	current	
US 371	131	211	Little Falls, MN	Bemidji, MN	1931	1971	Intrastate, Minnesota only; redesignated MN 371
US 377	478	769	US 90/US 277 in Del Rio, TX	I-44/SH-99 in Stroud, OK	1930	current	Oklahoma signs the northern end at I-44 at Stroud
US 378	234	377	US 78/SR 10/SR 17/SR 47 in Washington, GA	US 501 Bus. in Conway, SC	1952	current	
US 380	673	1,083	I-25/US 85 in San Antonio, NM	I-30/US 67/US 69 in Greenville, TX	1932	current	
US 383	175	282	Oakley, KS	Elm Creek, NE	1941	1982	Partially redesignated as K-383
US 385	1,206	1,941	Big Bend National Park, TX	US 85 in Deadwood, SD	1958	current	
US 385	773	1,244	Raton, NM	Boerne, TX	1926	1935	Replaced by US 87
US 395	1,305	2,100	I-15 in Hesperia, CA	Highway 395 at the Canadian border north of Laurier, WA	1926	current	
US 399	137	220	Bakersfield, CA	Ventura, CA	1934	1964	Intrastate, California only, replaced by SR 33, SR 99, and SR 119
US 400	477	768	US 50/US 385 in Granada, CO	I-44/US 166 in Joplin, MO	1994	current	
US 401	257	414	US 76 Bus./US 521 in Sumter, SC	I-85/US 1 north of Wise, NC	1957	current	
US 401	53	85	South Boston, VA	South Hill, VA	1926	1931	Replaced by US 58
US 401	272	438	Walterboro, SC	Raleigh, NC	1932	1934	Replaced by US 15
US 410	469	755	US 101 in Aberdeen, WA	US 95 in Lewiston, ID	1926	1967	Largely replaced by US 12; a long section is SR 410
US 411	314	505	US 78 in Leeds, AL	US 25W/US 70 in Newport, TN	1934	current	
US 411	110	180	Bristol, VA	Cumberland Gap, TN	1926	1932	Replaced by US 58
US 411	109	175	Madison, NC	Rockingham, NC	1932	1934	Replaced by US 220
US 412	1,131	1,820	US 56/NM 21 at Springer, NM	I-65 at Columbia, TN	1982	current	
US 420	41	66	Deaver, WY	Cody, WY	1926	1933	Replaced by US 116, which became part of US 14 just one year later
US 421	941	1,514	NC 211/Fort Fisher-Southport Ferry at Fort Fisher, NC	US 20 in Michigan City, IN	1930	current	
US 422	273	439	US 6/US 20/SR 8/SR 14/SR 43/SR 87 at Public Square in Cleveland, OH US 322/PA 39 in Hershey, PA	US 219 northwest of Ebensburg, PA I-76/US 202 in King of Prussia, PA	1926	current	
US 425	219	352	US 61/US 84 in Natchez, MS	I-530/US 63/US 65/US 65B/US 79/AR 190 in Pine Bluff, AR	1989	current	
US 430	37	60	Crystal Lake, IL	Aurora, IL	1926	1934	Intrastate, Illinois only; redesignated IL 31
US 431	556	895	US 231/US 231 Bus./US 431 Bus./SR 210 in Dothan, AL	US 60/KY 2831 in Owensboro, KY	1954	current	
US 441	936	1,506	US 41 in Miami, FL	US 25W/SR 116 in Rocky Top, TN	1926	current	Florida signs the southern end at US 41
US 450	465	748	Walsenburg, CO	Crescent Junction, UT	1926	1939	Replaced by US 160
US 460	655	1,054	US 60/US 421 in Frankfort, KY	US 60 in Norfolk, VA	1933	current	
US 466	53	85	Los Lunas, NM	Socorro, NM	1926	—	Replaced by US 85; not in revised numbering plan
US 466	526	847	Kingman, AZ	Morro Bay, CA	1935	1971	
US 470	73	117	Willard, NM	Albuquerque, NM	1926	1931	Replaced by US 366
US 485	164	264	Raton, NM	Santa Fe, NM	1926	1931	Replaced by US 64
US 491	198	319	I-40/NM 602 in Gallup, NM	US 191 in Monticello, UT	2003	current	Result of a renumbering of US 666
US 501	355	571	US 17 Bus. in Myrtle Beach, SC	US 60 in Buena Vista, VA	1926	current	
US 511	284	457	Bristol, TN	Strawberry Plains, TN	1926	1929	Replaced by US 11E
US 521	177 (Note: The new length in North Carolina is 4 miles (6.4 km).)	285	US 17 in Georgetown, SC	I-485 in Charlotte, NC	1932	current	
US 522	308	496	US 60 in Powhatan, VA	US 11/US 15 in Selinsgrove, PA	1926	current	
US 530	25	40	Echo, UT	Kimball Junction, UT	1926	1938	Replaced by US 189
US 541	51	82	Chapman, FL	Bradenton, FL	1931	1951	Intrastate, Florida only; replaced by Bus. US 41 and US 41
US 550	302	486	I-25/US 85/NM 165 in Bernalillo, NM	US 50 at Montrose, CO	1926	current	
US 566	118	190	Hondo, NM	San Antonio, NM	1926	1931	Replaced by US 380
US 601	319	513	US 321 northwest of Tarboro, SC	US 52 in Mount Airy, NC	1926	current	
US 611	131	211	Philadelphia, PA	Scranton, PA	1926	1972	Redesignated PA 611
US 622	66	106	Mount Union, PA	Hancock, MD	1926	—	Possibly unsigned; replaced by US 522
US 630	37	60	Echo, UT	Ogden, UT	1926	—	Replaced by I-84; not in revised numbering plan
US 630	2	3.2	Weiser, ID	Weiser Junction, OR	1926	1933	Replaced by US 95 Spur
US 641	165	266	US 64 south of Clifton, TN	US 60/KY 91 in Marion, KY	1955	current	
US 650	27	43	Buena Vista, CO	Salida, CO	1926	1936	Replaced by US 285
US 666	605	974	Monticello, UT	Douglas, AZ	1926	2003	Replaced by US 491
US 701	172	277	US 17/US 17 Alt. in Georgetown, SC	US 301/NC 96 in Four Oaks, NC	1932	current	
US 711	103	166	South Waverly, PA	Northumberland, PA	1926	—	Possibly unsigned; replaced by US 220
US 730	41.78	67.24	I-84/US 30 east of Boardman, OR	US 12 south of Wallula, WA	1926	current	highest number currently used in system; shortest highway in the system
US 789	—	—	Nogales, AZ	Sweet Grass, MT	1950	1952	Proposed, but never commissioned
US 830	209	336	US 101 northeast of Ilwaco, WA	US 97 north of Maryhill, WA	1926	1968	Intrastate, Washington only; now SR 14, I-5 (former US 99), and SR 4
Former; Unbuilt or under construction

== See also ==
- Interstate Highway System
- National Highway System
