= North Fork River =

North Fork River may refer to several places:

- North Fork River (Missouri–Arkansas), a tributary of the White River
- North Fork Double Mountain Fork Brazos River, a tributary of the Brazos River, Texas
- North Fork Gunnison River, a tributary of the Gunnison River in Colorado
- North Fork Redbank Creek, a tributary of Redbank Creek in Pennsylvania
- North Fork Skykomish River, a tributary of the Snoqualmie River in Washington

== See also ==
- North Fork (disambiguation)
- North Fork New River, a river in North Carolina and a tributary of the New River
