= U.S. Route 158 =

Highway in the United States

U.S. Highway 158
- US 158 mainline in red, business routes in blue

Route information
- Auxiliary route of US 58
- Maintained by NCDOT
- Length: 350.2 mi (563.6 km)
- Existed: 1932–present

Major junctions
- West end: US 64 / US 601 in Mocksville
- I-40 in Winston-Salem; US 52 / NC 8 in Winston-Salem; I-74 in Winston-Salem; I-73 / US 220 in Summerfield; US 29 in Reidsville; US 15 at Oxford; I-85 from Oxford to Henderson; I-95 near Roanoke Rapids; US 13 from Winton to Tarheel; US 17 from South Mills to Elizabeth City
- East end: US 64 / NC 12 at Whalebone Junction

Location
- Country: United States
- State: North Carolina
- Counties: Davie, Forsyth, Guilford, Rockingham, Caswell, Person, Granville, Vance, Warren, Halifax, Northampton, Hertford, Gates, Pasquotank, Camden, Currituck, Dare

Highway system
- United States Numbered Highway System; List; Special; Divided; North Carolina Highway System; Interstate; US; State; Scenic
← NC 157	→ NC 159

U.S. Route 158 (US 158) is an east–west United States highway that runs for 350 miles (560 km) from Mocksville to Whalebone Junction in Nags Head, and is located entirely in the state of North Carolina. The longest intrastate U.S. Route in the system, it is also a critical route that connects the cities of Winston-Salem, Summerfield, and Reidsville with one another.

== Route description ==
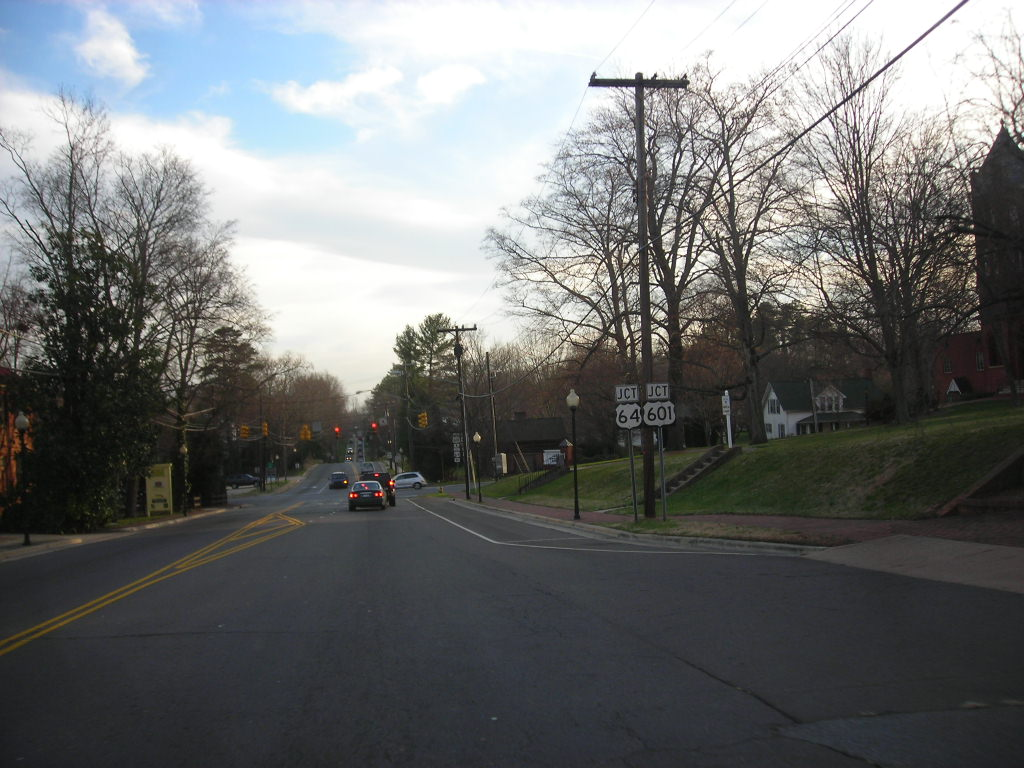
Western terminus at US 64/US 601 in Mocksville

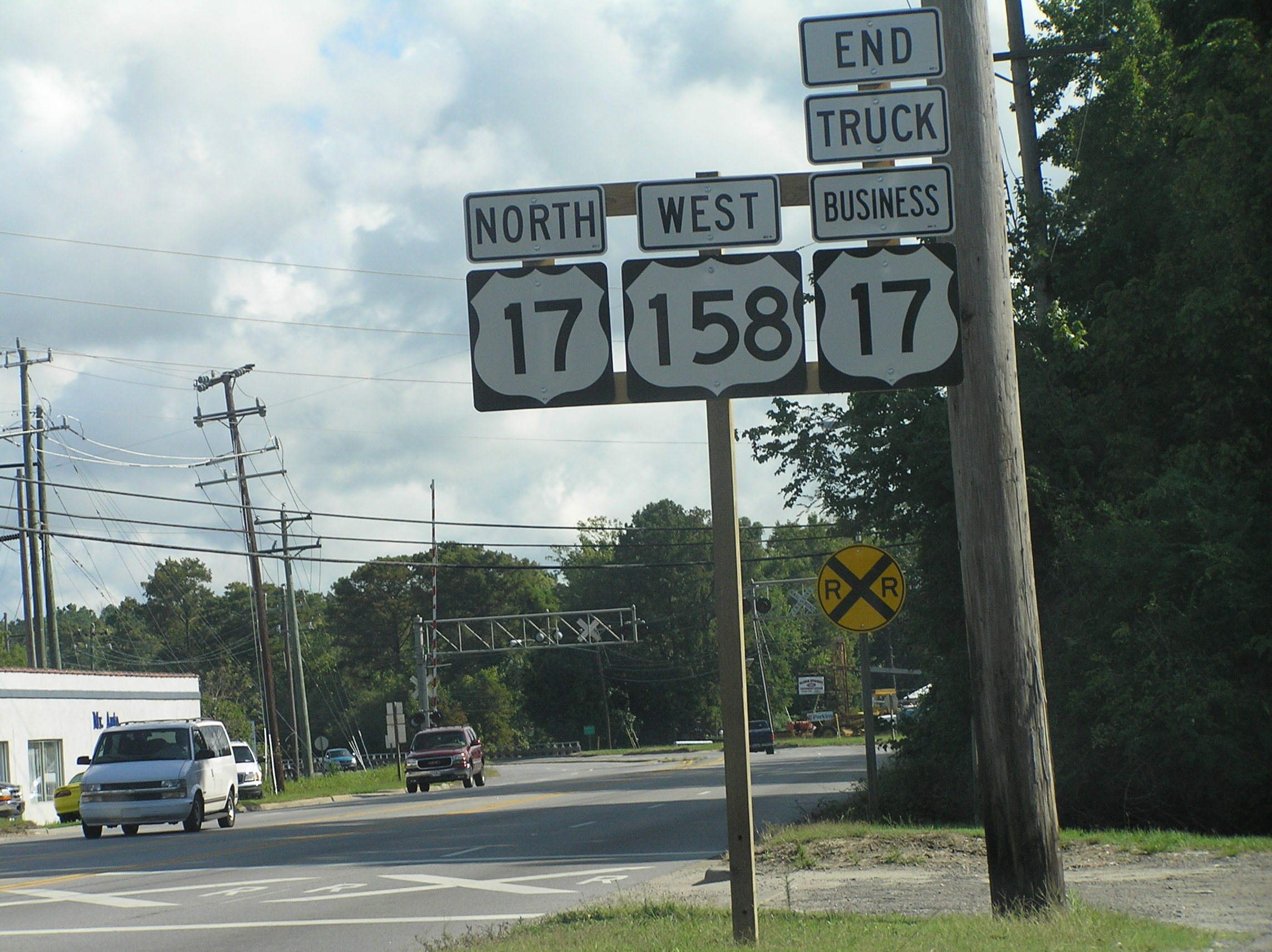
US 17 northbound/US 158 westbound past the northern termini of US 17 Bus. and US 17 Bus. Truck in Elizabeth City

US 158 is a parallel of U.S. Route 58 (which runs generally through southern Virginia), although the route does not intersect its parent, instead intersecting its sibling, US 258. It currently runs for 350.2 miles (563.6 km) from Mocksville, at US 64/US 601 to Whalebone Junction in the town of Nags Head, at US 64/ North Carolina Route 12. A 10 miles (16 km) stretch skirts the Great Dismal Swamp.

In Mocksville, it begins going east and heads north of the US 64/US 601 junction, through the downtown area. Out of town, it turns northeasterly, traversing parallel to Interstate 40 (I-40) to Winston-Salem. The route comes to an intersection with NC 801 before crossing the Yadkin River. The route continues in the district, where it comes to the two folded diamond junctions with Interstate 40 and the Silas Creek Parkway (NC 67). Exiting the district, US 158 transitions to follow along Salem Parkway (US 421), with the two traversing concurrently in the central downtown area of Winston-Salem. On the east outskirts of Winston-Salem, it leaves Salem Parkway and turns roughly north, closely paralleling nearby US 311, heading into Walkertown where both routes intersect with Interstate 74 (the Winston-Salem Northern Beltway) and NC 66. Here, Motorists can use both NC 66 and NC 74 to connect between US 158 and US 311 within town. It then passes through Belews Creek, taking on a northeasterly path and effectively bypassing the Kernersville area, and passes thru Stokesdale where it meets two more NC Highways, NC 65, and NC 68. Shortly after, it passes through the north part of Summerfield, intersecting Interstate 73 (in concurrency with U.S. Route 220). It then leads further east to Reidsville, where it links to US 29 Business. From Reidsville, US 158 connects the northern counties of North Carolina, going through the cities and towns of Yanceyville, Roxboro, Oxford, Henderson, Roanoke Rapids, Murfreesboro, and Elizabeth City.

From North Carolina Highway 168 (NC 168) eastward, it carries traffic from the Norfolk region to the Outer Banks. Normally, the route is a four-lane undivided highway with a speed limit of 50 miles per hour (80 km/h) in Dare County, from its eastern terminus to the Wright Memorial Bridge. Most of the route is otherwise a four-lane divided highway with a 55 miles per hour (89 km/h) speed limit until NC 168 (which carries traffic to Chesapeake, Virginia), where it turns left at an at-grade intersection. It then returns to being undivided.

In Dare County, the highway runs in a north–south direction, although it is signed west–east. It acts as a bypass route for the Virginia Dare Trail (NC 12), which runs parallel to US 158 to the east. The route then terminates at US 64. For the entire length of the Outer Banks, US 158 is known as Croatan Highway.

== History ==
US 158 was established in 1932, as a concurrency with NC 48 from Mocksville to Murfreesboro and NC 12, from Murfreesboro to Virginia state line. US 158 also replaced US 117 routing between Murfreesboro to Franklin, Virginia. In 1934, NC 48 and NC 12 were removed from its routing. In 1937 or 1938, US 158's western terminus moved from Depot Street to Main Street in Mocksville. In 1941, US 158 swapped routes with NC 65 between Stokesdale and Reidsville. Also in the same year, US 158 was rerouted east at Murfreesboro, replacing NC 30 to Camden and NC 34 crossing the Croatan Sound and ending at NC 345, near Manteo; its old alignment north of Murfreesboro became part of US 258. Between 1945-1949, US 158's western terminus moved to its current location at Main and Lexington Streets, in Mocksville; also in same time period, US 158 was moved onto new routing through Roxboro; its old alignment along Main Street became US 501A. In 1946, US 158 bypassed north of Gatesville, with its old alignment became US 158A.

Around 1951, US 158 was removed from Roanoke Island and was truncated at its current eastern terminus at Whalebone Junction, on Bodie Island; its former routing was replaced by US 64/US 264. In 1951, US 158 was placed on new bypass north of Henderson, leaving behind US 158A along its old alignment. Around 1954, US 158 was placed on one-way streets in downtown Winston-Salem: westbound via Clover Dale Street, Glade Street and fifth street; eastbound via first and fourth streets. In 1955, US 158 was bypassed north of Warrenton, leaving behind US 158A along its former alignment.

In 1959, US 158 was moved onto new expressway between Stratford to Marshall and Cherry Streets, in Winston-Salem. In 1960, US 158 was moved onto its current routing in Bodie Island, leaving behind US 158 Business.

By 1962, US 158 had completed its transition onto the freeway in Winston-Salem, leaving behind US 158 Business. Between 1963-1967, US 158 was routed onto one-way streets in Weldon. In 1968, US 158 was rerouted in Elizabeth City.

In 1971, US 158 was placed onto the Yanceyville bypass; its old routing through the downtown area was partly replaced by NC 62, with Main Street downgraded to secondary road. In 1973, US 13/US 158 was placed on new western bypass of Winton, its old alignment became part of NC 45. In 1979, US 158 was placed on bypass north of Reidsville, via US 29 Bus. and NC 14; its old alignment became mostly secondary roads, with just part remaining as NC 87. In 1984, US 17/US 158 was rerouted again in Elizabeth City. In 1995, US 158 was rerouted onto new bypass south of Murfreesboro, leaving behind US 158 Business.

In May 2016, NCDOT's applied to AASHTO to change US 158's route in the Reidsville area. Instead of following Bus. US 29 and NC 87 north to NC 14 and then South-east on NC 14 to US 29, the route would bypass the City by taking US 158 south along Bus. US 29/NC 87 to where they split and then following NC 87 South to US 29. US 158 would then run concurrent with US 29 to the NC 14 exit where it would resume its old alignment. AASHTO approved the change on May 24 at the meeting of the Special Committee on U.S. Route Numbering in Waterloo, Iowa. NCDOT passed its ordinance approving the change on March 5, 2018.

=== U.S. Route 117 ===
U.S. Route 117
- Location: Norlina, NC –Virginia Beach, VA
- Length: 159 mi (256 km)
- Existed: 1926–1932

U.S. Route 117 (US 117) was established in 1926 to run for 159 miles (256 km) from Norlina, through the towns of Warrenton, Roanoke Rapids, and Murfreesboro; from there it went north into Virginia through Franklin, Suffolk, Portsmouth, and Norfolk to Virginia Beach. It was cut back to Franklin in 1931 or 1932, being replaced by US 58 east of there, and soon afterwards the remainder was renumbered US 158.

== Junction list ==
County	Location	mi	km	Exit	Destinations	Notes
Davie	Mocksville	0.0	0.0		US 64 / US 601 – Statesville, Lexington, Cooleemee, Salisbury	
Davie		4.8	7.7		To I-40 / Farmington Road – Farmington	
Davie	Hillsdale	11.3	18.2		NC 801 – Farmington, Cooleemee	
Forsyth	Winston-Salem	20.7	33.3		I-40 – Statesville, Greensboro	
Forsyth	Winston-Salem	21.7	34.9		NC 67 (Silas Creek Parkway)	
Forsyth	Winston-Salem	23.3	37.5	235B	US 421 north – Yadkinville	North end of US 421 overlap
Forsyth	Winston-Salem	23.4	37.7	235A	North Stratford Road	
Forsyth	Winston-Salem	23.8	38.3	234C	Cloverdale Avenue	
Forsyth	Winston-Salem	24.2	38.9	234B	West First Street / Hawthorne Road	Westbound exit and eastbound entrance
Forsyth	Winston-Salem	24.6	39.6	234A	NC 150 west (Peters Creek Parkway)	West end of NC 150 overlap
Forsyth	Winston-Salem	25.0	40.2		Broad Street – BB&T Ballpark	Permanently closed as of November 2018
Forsyth	Winston-Salem	25.2	40.6	233B	Cherry Street / Marshall Street	To Convention Center; Cherry Street signed indirectly from eastbound; Marshall Street signed indirectly from westbound
Forsyth	Winston-Salem	25.4	40.9	233A	Main Street	Westbound exit and eastbound entrance; to Old Salem and Salem College
Forsyth	Winston-Salem	26.0	41.8	232B-C	US 52 / NC 8 (John Gold Memorial Expressway) – Lexington, Mount Airy, Smith Reynolds Airport	NC 8 unsigned on guide signs; Smith Reynolds Airport signed as "Airport"
Forsyth	Winston-Salem	26.4	42.5	232A	Martin Luther King Jr. Drive	To Winston-Salem State University
Forsyth	Winston-Salem	27.4	44.1	231	Lowery Street / Fifth Street	Eastbound Lowery Street, westbound Fifth Street
Forsyth	Winston-Salem	28.3	45.5	230	US 421 south / NC 150 south – Kernersville, Greensboro	East end of NC 150 and south end of US 421 overlap Eastbound exit and westbound entrance
Forsyth	Walkertown	31.2	50.2		I-74 – Wytheville, High Point	Interchange, partially opened to traffic on September 5, 2020
Forsyth	Walkertown	33.8	54.4		NC 66 (Old Hollow Road) – Kernersville	
Guilford	Stokesdale	43.9	70.7		NC 65 (Belews Creek Road) – Walnut Cove	
Guilford	Stokesdale	44.7	71.9		NC 68 – High Point	
Guilford	Stokesdale	48.2	77.6		I-73 / US 220 – Greensboro, Summerfield, Madison	
Rockingham	Reidsville	63.5	102.2		US 29 Bus. south / NC 87 south / Richardson Drive – Greensboro, Burlington	South end of US 29 Business and NC 87 overlap
Rockingham	Reidsville	65.5	105.4		NC 65 west / NC 87 north (Harrison Street) – Wentworth, Eden	North end of NC 87 overlap
Rockingham	Reidsville	67.4	108.5		Scales Street	
Rockingham	Reidsville	67.7	109.0		US 29 Bus. north / NC 14 north – Eden, Danville	North end of US 29 Business/NC 14 overlap
Rockingham	Reidsville	68.3	109.9		Market Street	
Rockingham	Reidsville	70.2	113.0		US 29 – Greensboro, Danville	South end of NC 14 overlap; future I-785
Caswell		82.6	132.9		NC 150 west – Williamsburg	Eastern terminus of NC 150
Caswell	Yanceyville	89.0	143.2		NC 86 north – Danville	North end of NC 86 overlap
Caswell	Yanceyville	91.0	146.5		NC 62 south (Main Street) – Burlington	South end of NC 62 overlap
Caswell	Yanceyville	91.2	146.8		NC 62 north – Milton	North end of NC 62 overlap
Caswell		94.3	151.8		NC 86 south – Hillsborough	South end of NC 86 overlap
Caswell		98.0	157.7		NC 119 – Mebane, Semora	
Person	Roxboro	110.7	178.2		NC 49 south – Haw River	South end of NC 49 overlap
Person	Roxboro	111.2	179.0		NC 57 north – Semora, Milton	North end of NC 57 overlap
Person	Roxboro	111.6	179.6		US 501 north / NC 49 north – South Boston, Virgilina	North end of US 501/NC 49 overlap
Person	Roxboro	112.2	180.6		NC 157 south (Hurdle Mills Road) – Hurdle Mills	Northern terminus of NC 157
Person	Roxboro	112.6	181.2		US 501 south / NC 57 south (Durham Road) – Durham	South end of US 501/NC 57 overlap
Granville	Oxford	135.3	217.7		US 158 Bus. east (Roxboro Road) – Oxford	Western terminus of US 158 Bus.
Granville	Oxford	135.8	218.5		NC 96 (Little Batterwhite Road) – Virgilina	
Granville	Oxford	136.9	220.3		US 15 (College Street) – Clarksville	
Granville	Oxford	139.8	225.0		US 158 Bus. west (Williamsboro Street)	Eastern terminus of US 158 Bus.
Granville	Oxford	140.4	226.0		I-85 – Durham, Petersburg	
Granville		142.1	228.7		US 158 Bus. east – Henderson	Western terminus of US 158 Bus.
Vance	Henderson	147.0	236.6	213	I-85 south – Oxford, Durham	South end of I-85 overlap
Vance	Henderson	148.2	238.5	214	NC 39 – Downtown Henderson	
Vance	Henderson	149.0	239.8	215	I-85 north / US 1 Bus. south / US 158 Bus. west – Petersburg	North end of I-85 and south end of US 1 business overlap; eastern terminus of US 158 Bus.
Vance	Henderson	151.5	243.8		US 1 south – Wake Forest, Raleigh	South end of US 1 and north end of US 1 business overlap
Vance	Middleburg	154.0	247.8		I-85 / Flemingtown Road – Henderson, Durham, Petersburg	
Warren	Norlina	162.6	261.7		US 1 north / US 401 north – South Hill, Richmond	North end of US 1/US 401 overlap
Warren	Norlina	163.9	263.8		US 401 south / US 158 Bus. east – Warrenton	South end of US 401 overlap; western terminus of US 158 Bus.
Warren	Macon	168.8	271.7		US 158 Bus. west – Warrenton	Eastern terminus of US 158 Bus.
Halifax	Littleton	179.8	289.4		NC 4 south / NC 903 north – Warrenton	North end of NC 903 overlap
Halifax		186.4	300.0		NC 903 south – Halifax	South end of NC 903 overlap
Halifax	Roanoke Rapids	194.4	312.9		NC 48 (Roanoke Avenue) – Brinkleyville	
Halifax	Roanoke Rapids	195.8	315.1		NC 125 (Smith Church Road) – Halifax	
Halifax	Roanoke Rapids	196.8	316.7		I-95 – Rocky Mount, Emporia, Richmond	
Halifax	Weldon	199.0	320.3		US 301 south – Halifax, Rocky Mount	South end of US 301 overlap
Northampton	Garysburg	201.4	324.1		US 301 north – Emporia	North end of US 301 overlap
Northampton	Jackson	211.1	339.7		NC 305 north (Church Street) – Seaboard	North end of NC 305 overlap
Northampton	Jackson	212.0	341.2		NC 305 south – Rich Square	South end of NC 305 overlap
Northampton	Conway	224.1	360.7		NC 35 – Severn, Woodland	
Northampton		229.4	369.2		US 258 south / US 158 Bus. east – Murfreesboro, Woodland, Scotland Neck	South end of US 258 overlap; western terminus of US 158 Bus.
Hertford		232.0	373.4		US 258 north / NC 11 – Murfreesboro	North end of US 258 overlap
Hertford		233.3	375.5		US 158 Bus. west – Murfreesboro	Eastern terminus of US 158 Bus.
Hertford	Winton	241.2	388.2		US 13 south / NC 45 south (Mulberry Street) – Ahoskie, Winton	South end of US 13 overlap; northern terminus of NC 45
Gates		245.2	394.6		NC 137 east – Gatesville	Western terminus of NC 137
Gates	Tarheel	247.8	398.8		US 13 north – Suffolk	North end of US 13 overlap
Gates		253.0	407.2		US 158 Bus. east – Gatesville	Western terminus of US 158 Bus.
Gates		253.9	408.6		NC 37 – Gatesville, Gates, Suffolk	
Gates		255.6	411.3		US 158 Bus. west – Gatesville	Eastern terminus of US 158 Bus.
Gates	Sunbury	262.6	422.6		NC 32 – Edenton, Suffolk	
Pasquotank	Morgans Corner	278.1	447.6		US 17 north – Norfolk	North end of US 17 overlap
Pasquotank		281.0	452.2	264	US 17 Byp. south – Hertford, Edenton	Northern terminus of US 17 Byp.
Pasquotank	Elizabeth City	288.4	464.1		US 17 Bus. south (Road Street)	Northern terminus of US 17 Bus.
Pasquotank	Elizabeth City	289.3	465.6		US 17 south (Hughes Boulevard) – Hertford	South end of US 17 overlap
Pasquotank	Elizabeth City	289.9	466.5		US 17 Bus. (Road Street)	
Pasquotank River				Elizabeth City Bridge (drawbridge)		
Camden	Camden	293.7	472.7		NC 343 – South Mills, Old Trap	
Camden	Belcross	295.6	475.7		NC 34 north – Norfolk	Southern terminus of NC 34
Currituck	Barco	306.2	492.8		NC 168 north – Norfolk	Southern terminus of NC 168
Currituck		315.0	506.9		NC 136 east – Poplar Branch	Western terminus of NC 136
Currituck Sound				Wright Memorial Bridge		
Dare	Kitty Hawk	335.2	539.5		To NC 12 – Southern Shores, Duck, Corolla, Beaches	Outbound access via SR 1493, inbound access via Virginia Dare Trail
Dare	Nags Head	350.1	563.4		NC 12 – Cape Hatteras National Seashore, Nags Head Beaches, Hatteras Island, Ocracoke Island	Whalebone Junction
Dare	Nags Head	350.2	563.6		US 64 – Manteo, Wanchese	Eastern terminus; no access to US 64 east
1.000 mi = 1.609 km; 1.000 km = 0.621 mi: Closed/former; Concurrency terminus; Incomplete access

== Special routes ==
=== Winston-Salem business loop ===
U.S. Highway 158 Business
- Location: Winston-Salem, North Carolina
- Existed: 1962–1970

U.S. Route 158 Business, was established in 1962 as a renumbering of mainline US 158 in downtown Winston-Salem. The business loop traversed on one-way streets: eastbound used Cherry Street, 4th Street, and Dunleith Street; westbound used Marshall Street and 5th Street. In 1970, it was decommissioned.

=== Oxford alternate route ===
U.S. Highway 158A
- Location: Oxford, North Carolina
- Length: 4.7 mi (7.6 km)
- Existed: 1954–1971

U.S. Route 158 Alternate (US 158A), was established in 1954 as a partial bypass of Oxford. As an alternate spur route, it did not reconnect with US 158, instead going southwest to US 15. In 1971, US 158A was eliminated when Interstate 85 was built over it.

=== Oxford business loop ===
U.S. Highway 158 Business
- Location: Oxford, North Carolina
- Length: 4.2 mi (6.8 km)
- Existed: 1994–present

U.S. Route 158 Business, established in 1994, is a 4.2-mile (6.8 km) business loop that followed the original US 158 route through downtown Oxford, via Roxboro Road, College Street, and Williamsboro Street.

The entire route is in Oxford, Granville County.

mi	km	Destinations	Notes
0.0	0.0	US 158 – Roxboro, Henderson	
0.7	1.1	NC 96 north (Goshen Street), Virgilina	North end of NC 96 overlap
1.2	1.9	US 15 north (College Street), Clarksville	North end of US 15 overlap
2.0	3.2	US 15 south / NC 96 south (Hillsboro Street) – Creedmoor, Wilton	South end of US 15 and NC 96 overlap
4.2	6.8	US 158 – Roxboro, Henderson	
1.000 mi = 1.609 km; 1.000 km = 0.621 mi: Concurrency terminus

=== Henderson alternate route ===
U.S. Highway 158A
- Location: Henderson, North Carolina
- Length: 8.5 mi (13.7 km)
- Existed: 1951–1960

U.S. Route 158 Alternate (US 158A), was established in 1951, when mainline US 158 bypassed north of Henderson. US 158A followed the original route through downtown Henderson until 1960, when it was renumbered to US 158 Business.

=== Henderson business loop ===
U.S. Highway 158 Business
- Location: Henderson, North Carolina
- Length: 8.5 mi (13.7 km)
- Existed: 1960–present

U.S. Route 158 Business, established in 1960, is a 8.5-mile (13.7 km) business loop through downtown Henderson, via Oxford Road, Dabney Drive, and Garnett Street.

County	Location	mi	km	Destinations	Notes
Granville		0.0	0.0	US 158 – Oxford, Henderson	
Vance	Henderson	6.4	10.3	US 1 Bus. south (Raleigh Road) – Louisburg	South end of US 1 business overlap
Vance	Henderson	8.5	13.7	US 158 / US 1 Bus. north – Middleburg	North end of US 1 business overlap
1.000 mi = 1.609 km; 1.000 km = 0.621 mi: Concurrency terminus

=== Warrenton alternate route ===
U.S. Highway 158A
- Location: Warrenton, North Carolina
- Length: 7.5 mi (12.1 km)
- Existed: 1950–1960

U.S. Route 158 Alternate (US 158A), was established in 1950, when mainline US 158 bypassed north of Gatesville. US 158A followed the original route through downtown Warrenton until 1960, when it was renumbered to US 158 Business.

=== Warrenton business loop ===
U.S. Highway 158 Business
- Location: Warrenton, North Carolina
- Length: 7.5 mi (12.1 km)
- Existed: 1960–present

U.S. Route 158 Business, established in 1960, is a 7.5-mile (12.1 km) business loop through downtown Warrenton.

The entire route is in Warren County.

Location	mi	km	Destinations	Notes
Norlina	0.0	0.0	US 158 / US 401 north – Norlina, Macon	North end of US 401 overlap
Warrenton	3.1	5.0	US 401 south / NC 58 (Main Street) – Louisburg	South end of US 401 and north end of NC 58 overlap
	3.7	6.0	NC 58 south – Centerville	South end of NC 58 overlap
Macon	7.5	12.1	US 158 – Norlina, Macon	
1.000 mi = 1.609 km; 1.000 km = 0.621 mi: Concurrency terminus

=== Murfreesboro business loop ===
U.S. Highway 158 Business
- Location: Murfreesboro, North Carolina
- Length: 4.4 mi (7.1 km)
- Existed: 1996–present

U.S. Route 158 Business, established in 1996, is a 4.4-mile (7.1 km) business loop that followed the original US 158 route through downtown Murfreesboro, via Main Street.

County	Location	mi	km	Destinations	Notes
Northampton		0.0	0.0	US 158 / US 258 – Conway, Winton, Scotland Neck	
Hertford	Murfreesboro	2.8	4.5	US 258 / NC 11 south – Como, Oak City	Northern terminus of NC 11
Hertford		4.4	7.1	US 158 – Conway, Winton	
1.000 mi = 1.609 km; 1.000 km = 0.621 mi

=== Gatesville alternate route ===
U.S. Highway 158A
- Location: Gatesville, North Carolina
- Length: 4.9 mi (7.9 km)
- Existed: 1948–1960

U.S. Route 158 Alternate (US 158A), was established in 1948, two years after mainline US 158 bypassed north of Gatesville. It followed the original route through downtown Gatesville. In 1960, it was renumbered to US 158 Business.

=== Gatesville business loop ===
U.S. Highway 158 Business
- Location: Gatesville, North Carolina
- Length: 4.9 mi (7.9 km)
- Existed: 1960–present

U.S. Route 158 Business, established in 1960, is a 4.9-mile (7.9 km) business loop through downtown Gatesville.

The entire route is in Gates County.

Location	mi	km	Destinations	Notes
	0.0	0.0	US 158 – Winton, Sunbury	
	1.3	2.1	NC 37 north – Gates, Suffolk	North end of NC 37 overlap
Gatesville	2.5	4.0	NC 37 south (Main Street)	South end of NC 37 overlap
	4.9	7.9	US 158 – Winton, Sunbury	
1.000 mi = 1.609 km; 1.000 km = 0.621 mi: Concurrency terminus

=== Kill Devil Hills business loop ===
U.S. Highway 158 Business
- Location: Kill Devil Hills, North Carolina
- Length: 15.2 mi (24.5 km)
- Existed: 1960–1988

U.S. Route 158 Business, was established in 1960 as a renumbering of mainline US 158 on Bodie Island. In 1988, US 158 Business was decommissioned, replaced by a northern extension of NC 12.

== See also ==
- North Carolina Bicycle Route 4 - Concurrent with US 158 at various places
