= North Fork Dam =

North Fork Dam may refer to:

- North Fork Dam (Clackamas County, Oregon), which impounds the Clackamas River
- North Fork Dam (Placer County, California), which impounds the North Fork American River
- North Fork Dam (Santa Clara County, California), which impounds the North Fork Pacheco Creek

== See also ==
- North Fork (disambiguation)
