= Big Branch (Aarons Creek tributary) =

Stream in Virginia, USA

Big Branch Tributary to Aarons Creek
- Location of Big Branch mouth Big Branch (Aarons Creek tributary) (the United States)

Location
- Country: United States
- State: Virginia
- County: Mecklenburg

Physical characteristics
- Source: Perkins Branch divide
  - location: about 1 mile northwest of Siddon, Virginia
  - coordinates: 36°34′54″N 078°41′25″W
  - elevation: 442 ft (135 m)
- Mouth
  - location: about 1.5 miles northeast of Hitesburg, Virginia
  - coordinates: 36°33′14″N 078°42′33″W
  - elevation: 318 ft (97 m)
- Length: 3.00 mi (4.83 km)
- Basin size: 2.39 square miles (6.2 km^{2})
- Discharge
  - location: Aarons Creek
  - average: 2.92 cu ft/s (0.083 m^{3}/s) at mouth with Aarons Creek

Basin features
- Progression: Aarons Creek → Dan River → Roanoke River → Albemarle Sound → Pamlico Sound → Atlantic Ocean
- River system: Roanoke River
- Tributaries
  - left: unnamed tributaries
  - right: unnamed tributaries
- Bridges: White House Road

Big Branch is a 3.00 mi (4.83 km) long 1st order tributary to Aarons Creek in Mecklenburg County, Virginia.

== Course ==
Big Branch rises about 1 mile north of Siddon, Virginia, and then flows north-northwest to join Aarons Creek about 1.5 miles northeast of Hitesburg.

== Watershed ==
Big Branch drains 2.39 square miles (6.2 km^{2}) of area, receives about 44.9 in/year of precipitation, has a wetness index of 430.03, and is about 55% forested.

== See also ==
- List of Virginia Rivers
