= Tarheel, North Carolina =

- Unincorporated community
- Location within North Carolina Location within the United States
- Coordinates: 36°27′24″N 76°51′23″W
- Country: United States
- State: North Carolina
- County: Gates
- Elevation: 39 ft (12 m)
- Time zone: UTC-5 (Eastern (EST))
  - Summer (DST): UTC-4 (EDT)
- GNIS feature ID: 1025739

Tarheel is an unincorporated community in western Gates County, North Carolina. It is on the junction of U.S. Route 13, and U.S. Route 158, at an elevation of 39 feet (12 m).
