= Wright Memorial Bridge =

Bridges crossing over Currituck Sound

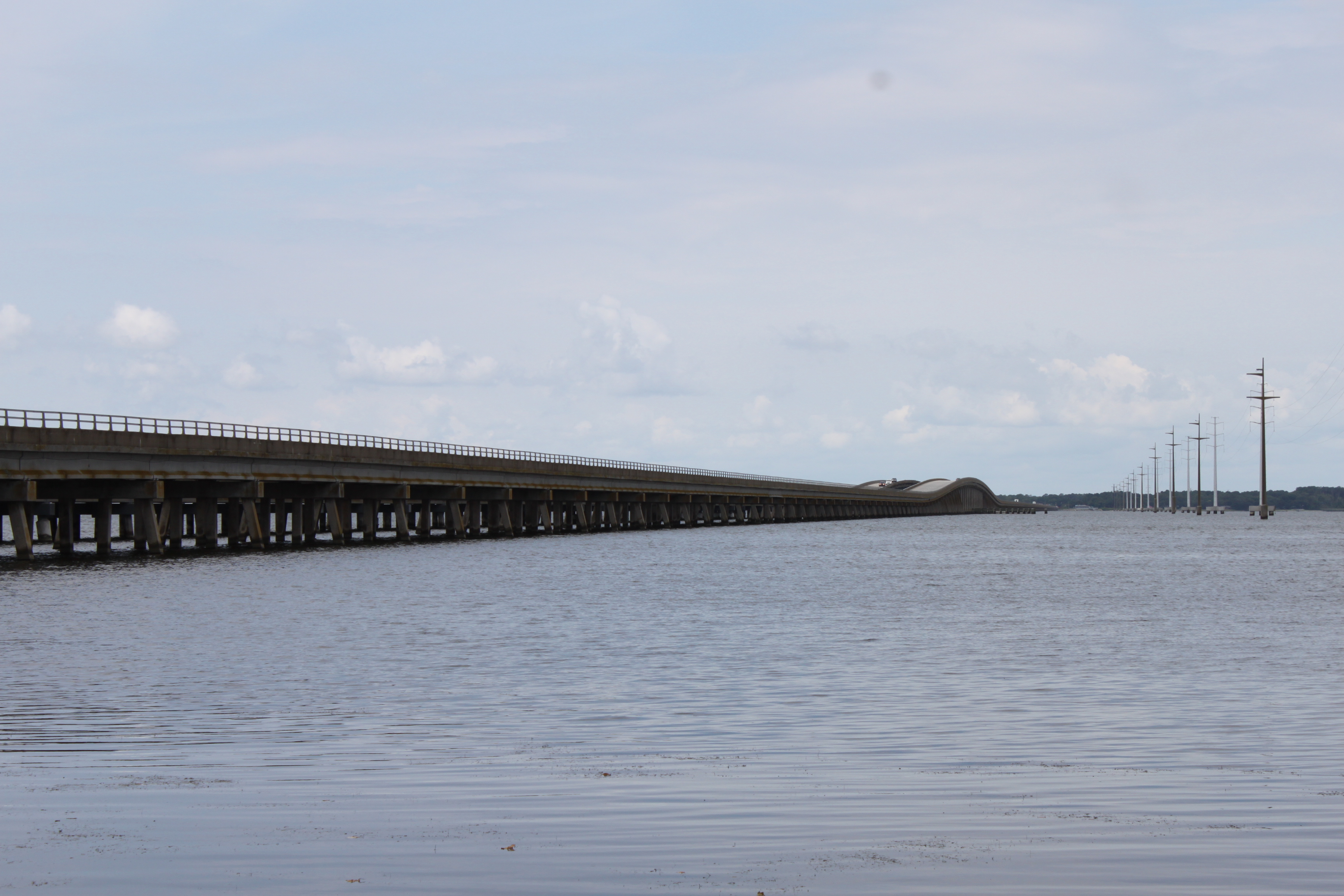
- Wright Memorial Bridge in 2022
- Coordinates: 36.08944°N 75.75583°W
- Carries: 4 lanes of US 158
- Crosses: Currituck Sound
- Locale: Currituck and Dare Counties
- Other name: Currituck Sound Bridge
- Named for: Wright brothers
- Owner: NCDOT
- Maintained by: NCDOT

Characteristics
- Design: Segmented girder (westbound); Concrete slab (eastbound)
- Material: Prestressed concrete
- Total length: 14,927.9 feet (4,550.0 m) (westbound); 14,867.9 feet (4,531.7 m) (eastbound)
- Width: 38.4 feet (11.7 m) (westbound); 33.8 feet (10.3 m) (eastbound)

History
- Opened: 1995 (westbound); 1966 (eastbound)

Statistics
- Daily traffic: 8,000 (as of 2011)

Location
- Interactive map of Wright Memorial Bridge

The Wright Memorial Bridge comprises two automobile bridges spanning the Currituck Sound, between Point Harbor, in Currituck County, and Kitty Hawk, in Dare County. The bridges carry US 158 and are dedicated to the Wright brothers.

== History ==
=== Wright Memorial Bridge I ===
The first bridge opened on September 27, 1930; built by the W.L. Jones Company of Elizabeth City and owned by the Wright Memorial Bridge Company. Entirely made of wood, the 3-mile (4.8 km) span took six months to construct, at a cost of $225,000. A toll bridge costing $1 per trip, it became the official gateway to the Outer Banks and even featured an archway at the Kitty Hawk end that read "Dare County" at top, "1583 Birthplace of a Nation" on left, and "1903 Birthplace of Aviation" on right. The bridge replaced a private ferry service between Point Harbor and Kitty Hawk.

In June 1935, the State Highway Commission purchased the Wright Memorial Bridge for $150,000 and removed the toll. In 1934, NC 344 was replaced by NC 34; which was later replaced by US 158 in 1941. In 1966, the first Wright Memorial Bridge was replaced and razed.

=== Wright Memorial Bridge II ===
The second and current eastbound bridge opened in 1966, replacing the first Wright Memorial Bridge. The new two-lane concrete slab bridge allowed a 55 miles per hour (89 km/h) speed limit, an improvement to the former bridge's 25 miles per hour (40 km/h) speed limit. In 1995 a second parallel bridge was constructed to alleviate traffic, which became the westbound bridge. The older eastbound bridge was reconstructed in 1997. Both bridges together provide four lanes of traffic.
