= Aarons Creek (Dan River tributary) =

Stream in Virginia, USA

Aarons Creek Tributary to Dan River
- Location of Aarons Creek mouth Aarons Creek (Dan River tributary) (the United States)

Location
- Country: United States
- State: Virginia
- Counties (VA): Halifax; Mecklenburg
- Counties (NC): Granville; Person

Physical characteristics
- Source: Tar River divide
  - location: pond about 5 miles northeast of Allensville, North Carolina
  - coordinates: 36°25′31″N 078°48′04″W
  - elevation: 605 ft (184 m)
- Mouth
  - location: about 1 mile northeast of Aarons Creek, Virginia
  - coordinates: 36°40′29″N 078°42′04″W
  - elevation: 300 ft (91 m)
- Length: 27.74 mi (44.64 km)
- Basin size: 67.01 square miles (173.6 km^{2})
- Discharge
  - location: Dan River
  - average: 74.91 cu ft/s (2.121 m^{3}/s) at mouth with Dan River

Basin features
- Progression: Dan River → Roanoke River → Albemarle Sound → Pamlico Sound → Atlantic Ocean
- River system: Roanoke River
- Tributaries
  - left: Crooked Fork; Wolfpit Run; Mountain Branch; Big Mountain Branch; North Fork
  - right: Perkins Branch; Big Branch
- Bridges: Thomas Green Road, Rosemary Way, Raymond Royster Road, Aaron Creek Church Road, NC 96, Grassy Creek-Virgilina Road, VA 49, Willards Mill Road, White House Road, US 58

Aarons Creek is a 27.74 mi (44.64 km) long 3rd order tributary to the Dan River in Halifax County, Virginia. Aarons Creek forms the boundary of Halifax and Mecklenburg Counties, Virginia up to the Dan River.

== Variant names ==
According to the Geographic Names Information System, it has also been known historically as:

- Aaron Creek
- Aaron's Creek
- Crooked Fork
- Tewa-ho-mony Creek
- Tewahominy
- Tewakominy Creek
- Tewaw-hommini Creek

== Course ==
Aarons Creek rises in a pond about 5 miles northeast of Allensville, North Carolina, in Person County and then flows north-northeast through Granville County, North Carolina and into Virginia to join the Dan River about 1 mile northeast of Aarons Creek.

== Watershed ==
Aarons Creek drains 67.01 square miles (173.6 km^{2}) of area, receives about 45.6 in/year of precipitation, has a wetness index of 421.02, and is about 56% forested.

== See also ==
- List of Virginia Rivers
- List of North Carolina Rivers
