= North Fork (Aarons Creek tributary) =

Stream in Virginia, USA

North Fork Tributary to Aarons Creek
- Location of North Fork mouth North Fork (Aarons Creek tributary) (the United States)

Location
- Country: United States
- State: Virginia
- County: Halifax

Physical characteristics
- Source: Wolpit Run divide
  - location: Virgilina, Virginia at the Stateline
  - coordinates: 36°32′37″N 078°46′50″W
  - elevation: 510 ft (160 m)
- Mouth
  - location: about 1 mile southeast of Midway, Virginia
  - coordinates: 36°38′01″N 078°42′43″W
  - elevation: 318 ft (97 m)
- Length: 9.43 mi (15.18 km)
- Basin size: 13.01 square miles (33.7 km^{2})
- Discharge
  - location: Aarons Creek
  - average: 15.53 cu ft/s (0.440 m^{3}/s) at mouth with Aarons Creek

Basin features
- Progression: Aarons Creek → Dan River → Roanoke River → Albemarle Sound → Pamlico Sound → Atlantic Ocean
- River system: Roanoke River
- Tributaries
  - left: unnamed tributaries
  - right: unnamed tributaries
- Bridges: 7th Street, Wilborn Road (x2), North Fork Church Road, Bowen Road, Red Bank Road, E Hitesburg Road, Aarons Creek Road, Buckshoal Road

North Fork is a 9.43 mi (15.18 km) long 2nd order tributary to Aarons Creek in Halifax County, Virginia.

== Variant names ==
According to the Geographic Names Information System, it has also been known historically as:

- North Fork Aaron Creek
- North Fork Aarons Creek
- North Fork Haron Creek

== Course ==
North Fork rises in a pond at the North Carolina-Virginia state line at Virgilina, Virginia, and then flows generally northeast to join Aarons Creek about 1 mile southeast of Midway.

== Watershed ==
North Fork drains 13.01 square miles (33.7 km^{2}) of area, receives about 45.5 in/year of precipitation, has a wetness index of 412.33, and is about 52% forested.

== See also ==
- List of Virginia Rivers
