= Whalebone Junction, North Carolina =

Whalebone Junction
- Crossroads
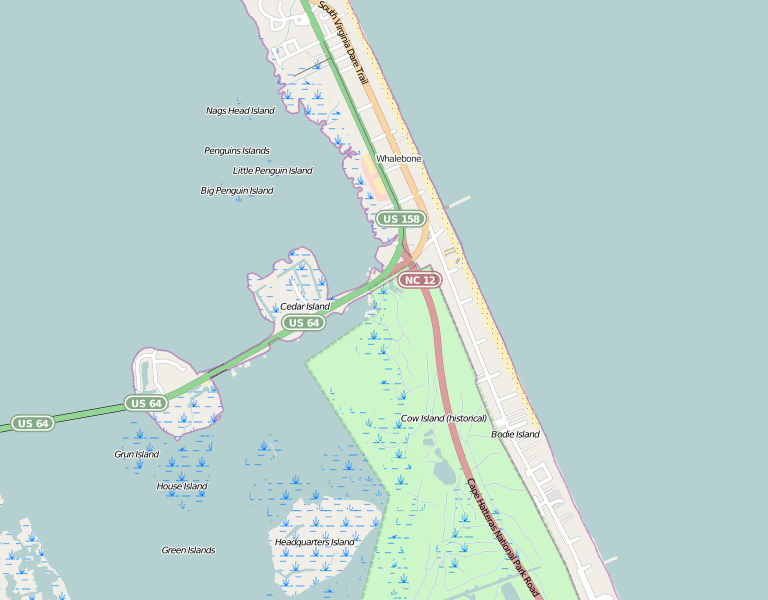
- Map of Whalebone Junction, North Carolina, on Bodie Island

- Location of Whalebone Junction within North Carolina
- Coordinates: 35.90639°N 75.59827°W
- Country: United States
- State: North Carolina
- County: Dare
- Municipality: Nags Head
- Elevation: 7 ft (2.1 m)
- Website: Whalebone Junction Information Station

Whalebone Junction is an area within Nags Head, North Carolina where three major highways converge. The junction marks the eastern terminus of both U.S. 64 and U.S. Route 158, while NC 12 traverses the junction from north to south. The junction is a major landmark on the Outer Banks, as U.S. 64 and U.S. 158 provide the only highway links to the mainland, while NC 12 is the main road linking all of the Outer Banks. North of Whalebone Junction lies the main commercial district of Nags Head as well as the communities of Kill Devil Hills and Kitty Hawk. South of Whalebone Junction begins the Cape Hatteras National Seashore and the Pea Island National Wildlife Refuge. Whalebone Junction Information Station, immediately south of the junction itself, serves as the visitor center to the Cape Hatteras National Seashore and provides information on the National Park and local attractions.
