= Nelson, Virginia =

Unincorporated community in Virginia, United States

- Unincorporated community
- Location within Virginia Location within the United States
- Coordinates: 36°33′45″N 78°42′17″W
- Country: United States
- State: Virginia
- County: Mecklenburg
- Elevation: 427 ft (130 m)
- Time zone: UTC-5 (Eastern (EST))
  - Summer (DST): UTC-4 (EDT)
- ZIP code: 24580
- Area code: 434
- GNIS feature ID: 1497039

Nelson is an unincorporated community in Mecklenburg County, Virginia, United States. Nelson is located on Virginia State Route 49, 4.1 miles (6.6 km) east-northeast of Virgilina. Nelson has a post office with ZIP code 24580. Nelson is mostly a small farm community owned by the Nelson family.
