= Virgilina, Virginia =

- Town
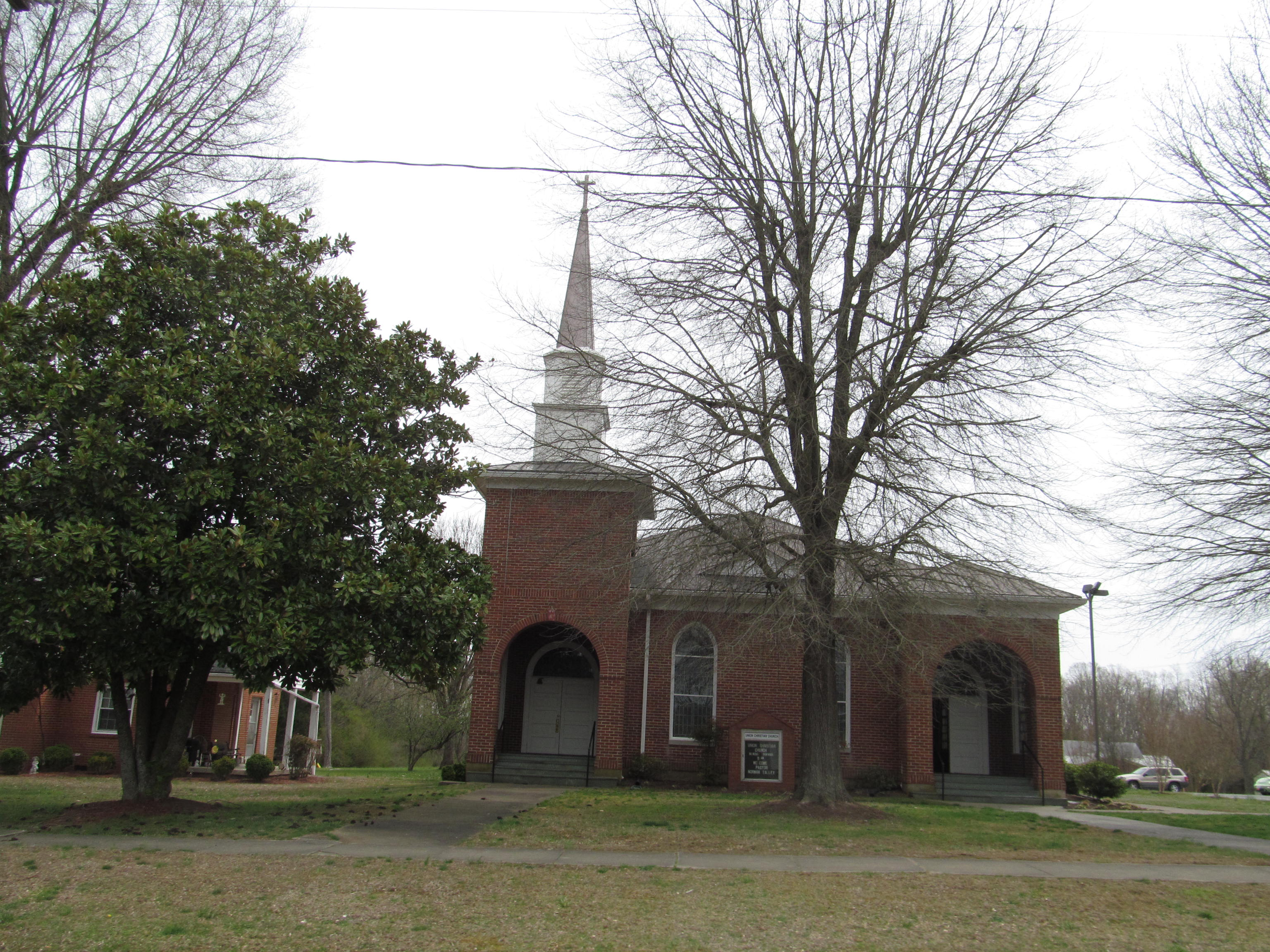
- Union Christian Church

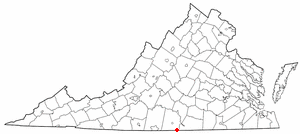
- Location of Virgilina, Virginia
- Coordinates: 36°32′43″N 78°46′25″W
- Country: United States
- State: Virginia
- County: Halifax

Government
  - Mayor/Chief of Police: Ralph Murray

Area
  - Total: 0.62 sq mi (1.60 km^{2})
  - Land: 0.61 sq mi (1.59 km^{2})
  - Water: 0.0039 sq mi (0.01 km^{2})
- Elevation: 551 ft (168 m)

Population (2020)
  - Total: 126
  - Density: 223.1/sq mi (86.15/km^{2})
- Time zone: UTC−5 (Eastern (EST))
  - Summer (DST): UTC−4 (EDT)
- ZIP code: 24598
- Area code: 434
- FIPS code: 51-81312
- GNIS feature ID: 1493858

Virgilina is a town in Halifax County, Virginia, United States. As of the 2020 census, Virgilina had a population of 226. Virgilina was once a copper mining town. It was a stop on the Atlantic and Danville Railway as recently as the 1950s. It is named "Virgilina" because it is located on the Virginia and North Carolina border.

== Geography ==
Virgilina is located in the southeastern corner of Halifax County at 36°32′43″N 78°46′25″W (36.545244, −78.773720). The town's southern border is the Virginia–North Carolina line. Virginia State Routes 96 and 49 intersect at the center of town. VA-96 leads west 7 miles (11 km) to U.S. Route 501 south of Cluster Springs, while VA-49 leads northeast 14 miles (23 km) to Clarksville. Both highway numbers continue into North Carolina: NC 96 leads southeast 20 miles (32 km) to Oxford, North Carolina, while NC 49 runs southwest 17 miles (27 km) to Roxboro, North Carolina.

According to the United States Census Bureau, Virgilina has a total area of 0.62 square miles (1.6 km^{2}), all land. The town center sits on a small ridge, with both sides draining to tributaries of Aarons Creek, which flows north to the Dan River, part of the Roanoke River watershed.

== Demographics ==
Historical population
Census	Pop.	Note	%±
1900	200		—
1910	270		35.0%
1920	350		29.6%
1930	338		−3.4%
1940	358		5.9%
1950	323		−9.8%
1960	286		−11.5%
1970	249		−12.9%
1980	212		−14.9%
1990	161		−24.1%
2000	159		−1.2%
2010	154		−3.1%
2020	126		−18.2%
U.S. Decennial Census

As of the census of 2000, there were 159 people, 76 households, and 43 families living in the town. The population density was 256.2 people per square mile (99.0/km^{2}). There were 86 housing units at an average density of 138.6 per square mile (53.6/km^{2}). The racial makeup of the town was 93.08% White, 1.66% African American and 1.26% Native American.

There were 76 households, out of which 15.8% had children under the age of 18 living with them, 42.1% were married couples living together, 10.5% had a female householder with no husband present, and 43.4% were non-families. 43.4% of all households were made up of individuals, and 23.7% had someone living alone who was 65 years of age or older. The average household size was 2.09 and the average family size was 2.91.

In the town, the population was spread out, with 18.9% under the age of 18, 5.0% from 18 to 24, 25.8% from 25 to 44, 23.9% from 45 to 64, and 26.4% who were 65 years of age or older. The median age was 46 years. For every 100 females, there were 82.8 males. For every 100 females aged 18 and over, there were 81.7 males.

The median income for a household in the town was $33,333, and the median income for a family was $43,125. Males had a median income of $30,625 versus $28,125 for females. The per capita income for the town was $17,337. None of the families and 3.2% of the population were living below the poverty line, including no under eighteens and 11.4% of those over 64.
