= Wade Avenue =

Roadway in Raleigh, North Carolina

- Freeway portion of Wade Avenue in purple, surface road in red

Route information
- Length: 6.1 mi (9.8 km)

Major junctions
- West end: I-40 near Raleigh
- I-440 / US 1 in Raleigh; NC 50 / US 70 in Raleigh
- East end: US 401 / US 70 / NC 50 in Raleigh

Location
- Country: United States
- State: North Carolina
- County: Wake

Highway system
- North Carolina Highway System; Interstate; US; State; Scenic

Wade Avenue is an artery corridor, located in Raleigh, North Carolina. The corridor is divided under the Raleigh Beltline (I-440), in which the stretch between Interstate 40 (west) to Interstate 440 (east) is a freeway. East of I-440, Wade Avenue is a boulevard-expressway hybrid, which with a blend of both at-grade and grade-separation. The entire route is internally designated as Secondary Road 1728 (SR 1728) from I-40 to Glenwood Avenue, however it is not signed as such. The short piece east of Glenwood Avenue carries U.S. Route 70 and North Carolina Highway 50.

== Route description ==
Wade Avenue begins at a modified Y-interchange with I-40 in West Raleigh and continues as a four-lane freeway, known locally as the Wade Avenue Extension. From here, the freeway continues southeast along mostly wooded areas and approaches a modified diamond interchange with Edwards Mill Road, providing access to Lenovo Center and the Carter–Finley Stadium. The highway then curves to a more easterly direction as it approaches another diamond interchange with Blue Ridge Road, which provides motorists access to the State Fairgrounds (home of the annual North Carolina State Fair, North Carolina State University's College of Veterinary Medicine, and the North Carolina Museum of Art. Wade Avenue continues east toward a complex interchange with I-440/US 1, resulting in the end of the freeway stretch of Wade Avenue. Continuing east, Wade Avenue becomes the four-lane arterial surface highway, coming to the pair of at-grade intersections which serve the Ridgewood section of the city, before the road downgrades and proceeds through a hilly terrain, passing by mostly residential neighborhoods for the next two miles. After coming to the cloverleaf exit with Oberlin Road, Wade Avenue returns to a southeasterly direction, near notable state offices. Another exit comes, with the U.S. Route 70 (US 70) and North Carolina Highway 50 (NC 50) interchange. From here, the two highways overlap with Wade Avenue until it ends with the interchange with U.S. Route 401 (Capital Boulevard), half mile later. In this vicinity, US 70 and NC 50 join US 401 heading south toward downtown Raleigh.

== History ==
The highway was named after Senator Benjamin Wade, a prominent anti-slavery figure, at a time when it passed through a Black neighborhood built in the 1870s. The eastern mostly-boulevard section was finished by the mid 20th century, while the western freeway stretch would be finished in the 1980s. Prior to the completion of I-40 to South Raleigh (and on to Wilmington), and the southern portion of the Beltline (I-440), I-40 was temporarily signed along the then recently finished western segment, where it terminated at the Raleigh Beltline, which was then just U.S. Highway 1/64.

== Major intersections ==
The entire route is in Raleigh, Wake County. All exits are unnumbered.

mi	km	Destinations	Notes
0	0.0	I-40 – Wilmington, Durham	Western terminus; exit 289 on I-40
1.2	1.9	Edwards Mill Road	Access to Lenovo Center and Carter–Finley Stadium
2.2	3.5	Blue Ridge Road	Access to State Fairgrounds, NC Museum of Art, and Veterinary School
3.0	4.8	I-440 / US 1 – Wake Forest, Sanford	Exit 3 B/C on I-440
3.0	4.8	Eastern end of freeway section	
4.9	7.9	Oberlin Road	Interchange; access to Village District
5.8	9.3	US 70 west / NC 50 north (Glenwood Avenue)	Interchange; west end of concurrency with US 70 and NC 50
6.1	9.8	US 401 / US 70 east / NC 50 south (Capital Boulevard)	Interchange; eastern terminus
1.000 mi = 1.609 km; 1.000 km = 0.621 mi: Concurrency terminus

== See also ==
- Hillsborough Street, which runs parallel to Wade Avenue to the south.
