= Tamasha Modern Indian =

Restaurant in Raleigh, North Carolina, U.S.

Tamasha
- Interactive map of Tamasha

Restaurant information
- Established: 2024
- Owners: Mike Kathrani and Tina Vora
- Head chef: Bhavin Chhatwani
- Food type: Indian
- Location: 4200 Six Forks Rd , Suite 130, Raleigh, North Hills, North Carolina, 27609, United States
- Coordinates: 35.8359°N 78.6384°W
- Website: tamashanc.com

Tamasha Modern Indian is a Michelin Guide–recommended luxury modern Indian fine-dining restaurant located in Raleigh, North Carolina.

Established in 2024 by serial entrepreneurs and co-owners, Mike Kathrani and Tina Vora. The restaurant is led by Executive Chef Bhavin Chhatwani and has gained national recognition for its contemporary interpretation of regional Indian cuisine, hospitality, and design-forward interiors.

Tamasha was included in Esquire's 2025 list of the “Best New Restaurants in America” and OpenTable’s “50 Most Beautiful Restaurants in America” list in 2024. Executive Chef Bhavin Chhatwani, who previously trained at Michelin-starred restaurants, was named a semifinalist for the James Beard Foundation Award for Emerging Chef in 2025.

Tamasha has received attention for its hospitality program in addition to its culinary programs.

The restaurant combines contemporary Indian cuisine with an interior design concept, integrating culinary, architectural.

Since its opening, Tamasha has been cited in regional and national dining coverage as part of a broader trend of contemporary Indian restaurants expanding fine-dining offerings in the southern United States.

== History ==
Tamasha Modern Indian opened in Raleigh’s North Hills district in February 2024. The restaurant was developed by Mike Kathrani and Tina Vora as a modern Indian dining concept blending regional Indian culinary traditions with contemporary techniques, design, and experiential hospitality. Executive Chef Bhavin Chhatwani leads the restaurant’s culinary program, helping shape its modern interpretation of regional Indian cuisine and dining experience.

The restaurant became known for its dining atmosphere, elevated cocktail program, theatrical presentation, and modern approach to Indian hospitality. Industry publications and culinary media have credited Tamasha with helping elevate Raleigh’s national dining profile and contributing to the evolution of modern Indian fine dining in the American South.

The restaurant’s interiors were designed by Tina Vora and combine contemporary luxury with Indian-inspired architectural detailing, incorporating velvet seating, gold arches, layered lighting, earthy textures, and modern materials intended to reinterpret Indian heritage through a contemporary lens. In 2024, OpenTable included Tamasha on its list of the “50 Most Beautiful Restaurants in America.”

== Menu ==
Tamasha serves contemporary Indian cuisine inspired by regional culinary traditions across India, with influences from western and coastal Indian cuisines. Executive Chef Bhavin Chhatwani incorporates culinary influences shaped by regional cuisines, professional experience and travel across India reflecting techniques and dishes encountered throughout his training and professional experience in India.

The menu includes contemporary interpretations of Indian cuisine alongside influences from Indian street food traditions. Locally sourced ingredients from North Carolina are incorporated as part of the restaurant’s adaptation of Indian cuisine to regional ingredients and sourcing practices.

== Reception ==
Tamasha received national recognition following its inclusion on Esquire's 2025 “Best New Restaurants in America” list. The restaurant was also included in the Michelin Guide American South edition as a Michelin-recommended establishment.

In 2024, OpenTable recognized Tamasha in its annual list of the “50 Most Beautiful Restaurants in America”.

Executive Chef Bhavin Chhatwani was named among Plate Magazine's “Chefs to Watch” in 2024.
