= Interstate 440 (North Carolina) =

Highway in North Carolina

Interstate 440
- Cliff Benson Beltline; Raleigh Beltline
- I-440 highlighted in red

Route information
- Auxiliary route of I-40
- Maintained by NCDOT
- Length: 16.40 mi (26.39 km)
- Existed: 1991–present
- NHS: Entire route

Major junctions
- West end: I-40 / US 1 / US 64 near Cary
- US 70 / NC 50 near Raleigh; US 1 / US 401 near Raleigh; I-87 / US 64 / US 264 near Raleigh
- East end: I-40 / US 64 near Raleigh

Location
- Country: United States
- State: North Carolina
- Counties: Wake

Highway system
- Interstate Highway System; Main; Auxiliary; Suffixed; Business; Future; North Carolina Highway System; Interstate; US; State; Scenic
← US 421	→ US 441

Interstate 440 (I-440), also known as the Raleigh Beltline, the Cliff Benson Beltline, or locally as The Beltline, is an Interstate Highway in the US state of North Carolina. I-440 is a 16.4-mile-long (26.4 km) partial beltway that nearly encircles central Raleigh. I-440 begins in west Raleigh at an interchange with I-40 as a continuation of U.S. Highway 64 (US 64)/US 1 and traverses a primarily residential area in west Raleigh. The freeway makes a turn toward the east, crossing US 70, Six Forks Road, and Wake Forest Road. US 1 branches north off I-440 at US 401 (Capital Boulevard), becoming US 401/US 1. I-440 turns toward the southeast and follows a brief concurrency with U.S. Highway 64 Business (US 64 Bus.) before intersecting I-87/US 64/US 264. US 64 and I-87 are concurrent with I-440 along the remainder of the road's southwesterly routing. Exit 16 is the last exit on I-440, where I-440 splits to join either I-40 eastbound or I-40 westbound.

The Raleigh Beltline was formed from a number of highway segments, the earliest of which had been in place since 1959. The loop was completed in 1984 under multiple route designations. To avoid confusion along the beltline, I-440 was routed along the entirety of the beltline and shared a concurrency with its parent, I-40, along the loop's southern segment (Tom Bradshaw Freeway). In 2008, the I-440 designation was removed from the section of I-40/US 64 in southeast Raleigh. The highway's original "inner" and "outer" directions were also removed and replaced with east and west directions. The easternmost two miles (3.2 km) of I-440 was rebuilt in 2015 as part of the larger widening project along I-40 in South Raleigh, while the westernmost four miles (6.4 km), the oldest segment and one which was not up to Interstate standards, was widened and upgraded.

== Route description ==
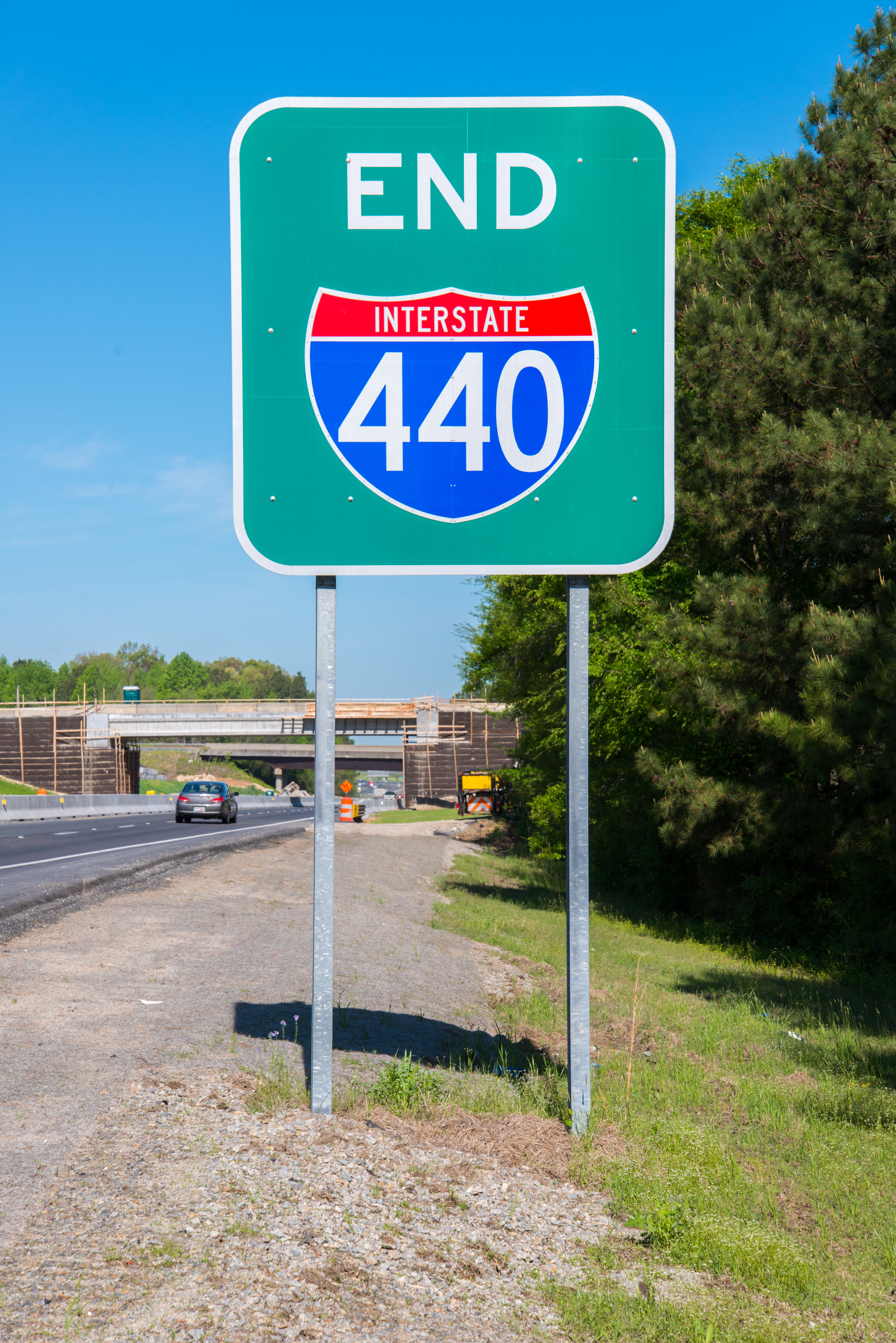
End I-440 sign at eastern terminus

I-440 begins on the western side of Raleigh at an interchange between I-40/US 1/US 64 (exits 1A and 1B), heading northeast concurrently with US 1. US 1/US 64 continues to the southwest on the same freeway. The freeway has an interchange with Jones Franklin Road (exit 1C) just over 0.5 miles (0.80 km) from its western terminus. Continuing northeast, the freeway runs between residential neighborhoods and has a partial interchange with Melbourne Road (exit 1D). Exit 2 provides access to Western Boulevard, a major arterial road that connects west Raleigh with north Cary. From there, the freeway slowly begins to turn toward the north and completes the turn after a partial cloverleaf interchange with NC 54 (Hillsborough Street) at exit 3A. North of that interchange, the freeway continues west of Meredith College and east of North Carolina State University's Centennial Biomedical Campus. East of there, exits 3B and 3C are a cloverleaf interchange with Wade Avenue, which provides access to Lenovo Center and Carter–Finley Stadium. The freeway turns slightly to the northeast to have an interchange with Lake Boone Trail (exit 5). Approaching US 70, the freeway makes another slight turn toward the northeast. An incomplete interchange at exit 6 serves Ridge Road directly before the US 70 cloverleaf interchange at exit 7. From there, the freeway turns to the east and runs between more neighborhoods in the North Hills area of Raleigh. After an interchange with Six Forks Road (exit 8), which provides access to the North Hills shopping center, I-440 turns southeasterly.

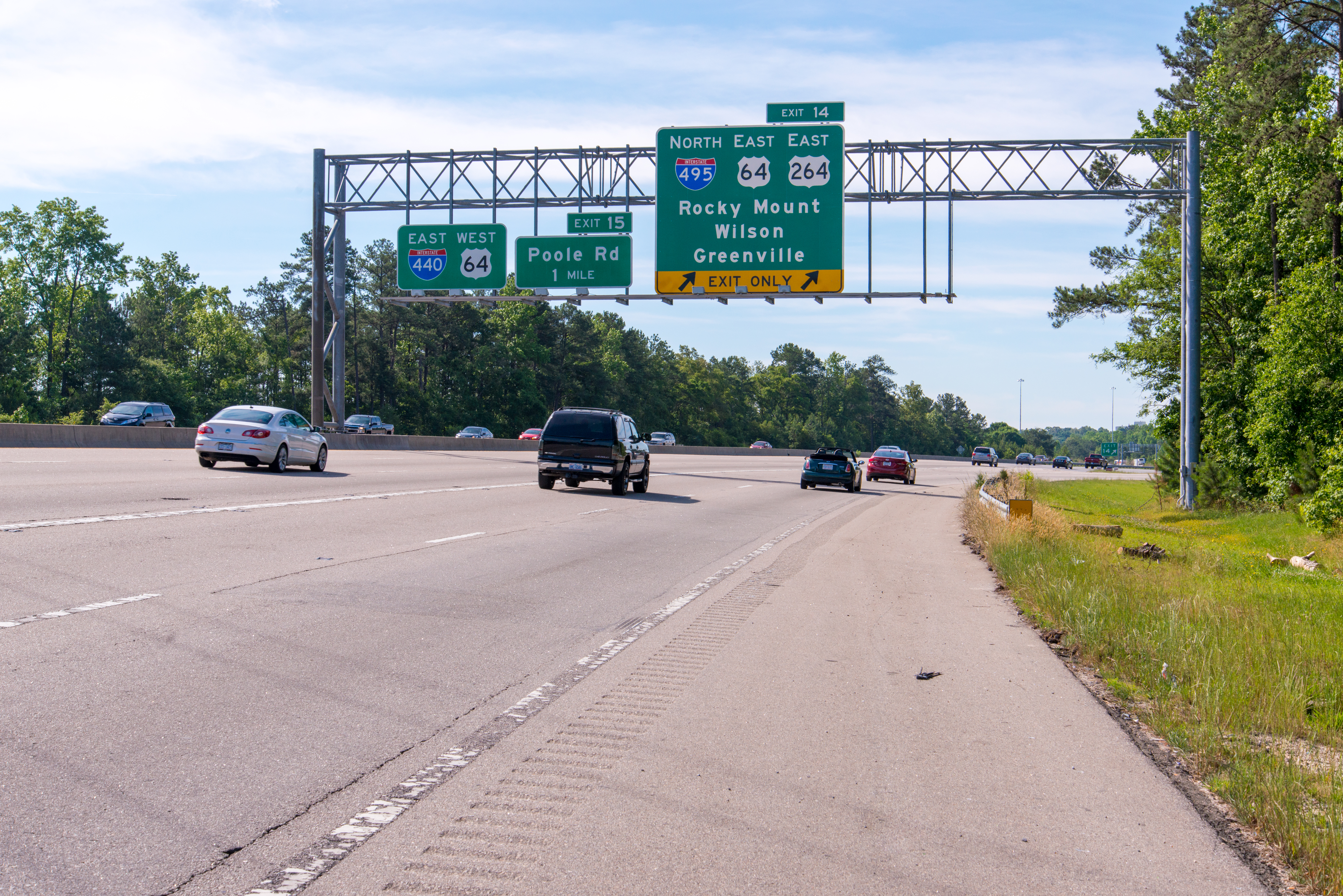
I-440 sign gantry at exit 14; I-495 has since been changed to I-87

The freeway passes south of Duke Raleigh Hospital after an interchange with Wake Forest Road (exit 10). Continuing to the southeast, the freeway crosses over Atlantic Avenue along with a railroad operated by CSX Transportation. Turning again to the southeast, a cloverleaf interchange at exit 11 provides access to US 401 (Capital Boulevard), which marks the end of the US 1 concurrency, as US 1 turns to the north to join Capital Boulevard. The freeway begins to parallel Crabtree Creek as it continues southeast. At exit 12, there are two incomplete exits: Yonkers Road is served by I-440 eastbound, while Brentwood Road and Noblin Road are served by I-440 westbound. A partial cloverleaf interchange at exit 13 serves New Bern Avenue along with US 64 Bus. eastbound. US 64 Bus. is concurrent with I-440 until exit 14. Immediately before reaching I-87/US 64/US 264 at exit 14, the freeway turns directly south. The freeway, along with several exit ramps, crosses over Crabtree Creek and a railroad owned by the Carolina Coastal Railway. US 64 continues concurrently with I-440 to the south. After an interchange with Poole Road (exit 15), the Interstate turns to the west along the southern side of Walnut Creek Park. Exit 16 is the last exit on I-440 and is used to serve I-40 eastbound. I-440 and I-87 continue to the west another 0.7 miles (1.1 km) before both terminating at I-40 westbound. US 64 continues concurrently with I-40.

== History ==
The Raleigh "Belt Line" was planned during the early 1950s as a beltway around the city. By 1953, funds had been set aside for the portion between New Bern Avenue and North Boulevard (later renamed to Capital Boulevard). In September 1962, the first portion opened to traffic. A few weeks later, another short section opened up to Hillsborough Street, just in time for the State Fair. The following January, the portion from Hillsborough Street to Glenwood Avenue opened. At this time, the freeway was signed as US 1 from Apex to Hillsborough Street. From there, US 1 followed Hillsborough Street east toward downtown. The remaining 3.3-mile-long (5.3 km) section of the freeway, running from Hillsborough Street north to Glenwood Avenue, remained unsigned.

Later in 1963, the northern section of the Raleigh Beltline was completed from Glenwood Avenue to North Boulevard (Capital Boulevard) where it met up with US 401. US 1 was then signed along the freeway from Hillsborough Street to North Boulevard, leaving its former routing through downtown Raleigh as US 1 Bus. The next year, US 64 was relocated to bypass Cary and connect with the US 1 freeway six miles (9.7 km) northeast of Apex. Also in 1964, a two-mile-long (3.2 km) section of the Beltline opened, extending the freeway all the way to New Bern Avenue. US 64 was rerouted along the Beltline from just north of Apex to New Bern Avenue, where it (US 64) turned toward the east. The former routing of US 64 through downtown Raleigh became known as US 64 Bus.

The route remained unchanged until September 1972, when US 70/NC 50 was relocated from its routing along Glenwood Avenue and placed along the Beltline from the Glenwood Avenue exit to North Boulevard, where the two roads then turned to the south and followed US 401 into downtown Raleigh. In 1975, construction began on a new extension of the Beltline, which was to run from New Bern Avenue southwest to Hammond Road in south Raleigh. By 1976, plans to extended the road from New Bern Avenue south and then west to US 70/US 401/NC 50 (South Saunders Street) were formalized. The first leg of the new construction was opened later that year, extending the freeway south to Poole Road. In April 1984, the construction of the Beltline along the south side of Raleigh was completed. US 70/US 401/NC 50 was rerouted from Downtown Boulevard (formerly North Boulevard, now called Capital Boulevard) along the east side of the Beltline to South Saunders Street, where both routes followed the road south toward Garner. The route change left the former routings through downtown Raleigh as secondary roads. US 64 was removed from the northern side of the Beltline and placed along the new southern side from US 1 near Cary to New Bern Avenue. I-40 was rerouted from present-day Wade Avenue and along the new construction before ending at US 1.

In 1991, state highway administrator William G. Marley Jr. asked the Federal Highway Administration to call the Raleigh Beltline I-440. On July 16, 1991, I-440 was officially designated as a new beltway running along the entirety of the existing Beltline. The new Interstate was cosigned with I-40 along the south side of Raleigh between exit 293/exit 1—where I-40, I-440, US 1, and US 64 met near Cary—and exit 301/exit 16, where I-40 turned to the south. I-440 was also cosigned with US 1 from exit 1 to Capital Boulevard (formerly Downtown Boulevard). US 64 was also signed along a brief concurrency with both I-440 and US 1 from exit 1 to Western Boulevard, where it turned east toward downtown. US 70, US 401, and NC 50 were rerouted from their Beltline designations through downtown Raleigh, causing worries about traffic on downtown streets.

That year, work began on a seven-year, $53-million (equivalent to $108 million in 2024) project to expand the Beltline to six lanes (three in each direction). Work in 1991 included widening a 3.6-mile-long (5.8 km) section of I-440 from Glen Eden Road to Wake Forest Road and rebuilding of the 30-year-old Glenwood Avenue bridge. Work began in early in 1993 to widen 4.4 miles (7.1 km) from Wake Forest Road to New Bern Avenue. On July 8, 1994, the state awarded the contract for widening 1.7 miles (2.7 km) to six lanes from Wade Avenue to Glen Eden Road. At that time, completion of the project's second phase was expected by June 1995, with phase three scheduled for completion in 1996. The two-mile (3.2 km) section between New Bern Avenue and Poole Road were widened starting in 1996. Plans called for widening the section from Wade Avenue to I-40 several years later, but, even after several delays, the 2006–2012 NC Transportation Improvement Program did not include funding for the $77.3-million (equivalent to $119 million in 2024) upgrade. The project was considered complete in 1997 except for the delayed section.

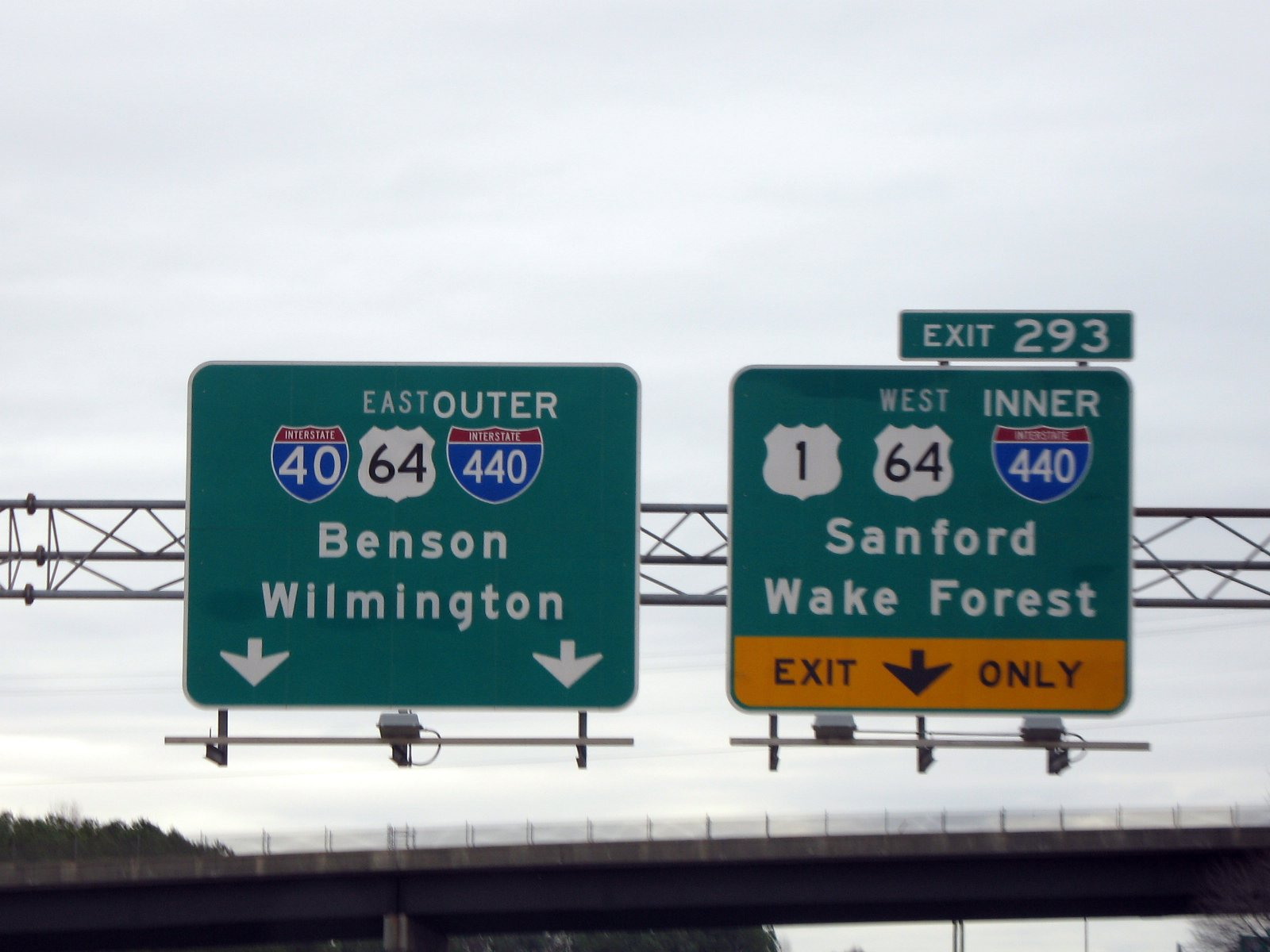
Former Signs along I-440 Showing the Inner and Outer Designations along the highway

The original I-440 designation used "inner" and "outer" labels rather than east and west labels because the freeway made a full loop around the city. "Inner" was used to designate the clockwise direction around the Beltline, and "outer" was used to designate counterclockwise. In 2008, State Highway Administrator W. F. Rosser asked the US Department of Transportation to remove the I-440 designation from the southern portion of the Beltline, where it was cosigned with I-40. This decision was primarily made to prevent confusion of travelers who used the highway. On November 10, 2008, I-440 was officially truncated on the western end at the I-40/US 1/US 64 interchange in western Raleigh and at the I-40 interchange in southeast Raleigh. The inner and outer labels were also dropped and replaced with east and west designations. The Federal Highway Administration route log has been updated to show the shortened distance. By 2010, the entirety of the highway's signs had been changed to the new designation.

I-440 was included in Project Fortify, which is a $130-million (equivalent to $166 million in 2024) project to replace pavement along the southern Beltline, which was crumbling due to a chemical reaction known as alkali–silica reaction (ASR). I-440 was included in the first phase of the project, which included replacing the freeway's pavement from the I-495/US 64/US 264 exit to the eastern terminus of the freeway at I-440. Lane closures on the approximately two-mile-long (3.2 km) section of the Beltline began in December 2013. The project's first phase was completed in early 2015, with the I-40 section of the project completed in 2017.

The North Carolina Department of Transportation (NCDOT) has designated a 3.5-mile (5.6 km) stretch of US 1/US 64 from Walnut Street to I-40 and I-440/US 1 from I-40 to Wade Avenue, to be redesigned and widened to six lanes. Originally completed in 1960, it is the oldest section of the Beltline; it features the original four lanes with minimal shoulders, substandard interchanges, and a merging left-lane onramp. A Purpose and Need Statement was completed in 2014, showing the need for the project through deficiencies in capacity, geometric (design of the roadway and interchanges), and road condition. NCDOT initially planned to spend $92 million, beginning with right-of-way acquisition in 2018. The project began in earnest in late 2019 and was completed by mid-2023, with a revised cost estimate of $475 million. Concurrent with the widening of I-440 is a redesign of Blue Ridge Road, which parallels this section of I-440, as well as new overpasses for several crossing streets and railroads. New bridges at the interchange were opened in April 2023.

The remainder of the widening project at Blue Ridge Road has been delayed, and completion is not expected until 2025.

== Future ==
As part of the widening project of I-40 to allow it to better serve current traffic needs, the I-40/I-440/US 1/US 64 interchange is currently being redesigned. Construction on the projects is expected to begin in 2025 at a cost of $68.8 million.

== Exit list ==
The entire route is in Raleigh, Wake County.

mi	km	Exit	Destinations	Notes
0.0	0.0	—	US 1 south / US 64 west – Sanford, Asheboro	Western end of US 1 concurrency; western terminus; continuation as US 1/US 64
0.0	0.0	1A–B	I-40 / US 64 east – Benson, Rocky Mount, Durham, RDU Airport	Signed as exits 1A (east) and 1B (west)
0.7	1.1	1C	Jones Franklin Road	
1.7	2.7	1D	Melbourne Road	Westbound exit and eastbound entrance
2.3	3.7	2	Western Boulevard	Diverging diamond interchange; access to NC State University
3.3	5.3	3A	NC 54 (Hillsborough Street)	
3.8	6.1	3B–C	Wade Avenue to I-40 – Carter–Finley Stadium, Lenovo Center	Signed as exits 3B (east) and 3C (west) westbound
4.7	7.6	5	Lake Boone Trail	
6.3	10.1	6	Ridge Road	Eastbound exit and entrance; westbound exit is part of exit 7A.
6.6	10.6	7A–B	US 70 / NC 50 (Glenwood Avenue) / Ridge Road – Crabtree Valley, Durham	Signed as exits 7A (east) and 7B (west) westbound
8.3	13.4	8A–B	Six Forks Road – North Hills	Signed as exits 8A (south) and 8B (north)
9.5	15.3	10	Wake Forest Road	Will be converted into a diverging diamond interchange; contract to be awarded in Spring 2026 with construction starting later that year.
10.8	17.4	11	US 1 north / US 401 (Capital Boulevard) – Wake Forest, Louisburg, Downtown	Eastern end of US 1 concurrency; signed westbound as exits 11A (south) and 11B (north)
11.5	18.5	12	Yonkers Road Brentwood Road	Eastbound exit and entrance Westbound exit and entrance
12.5	20.1	13A	New Bern Avenue – Downtown	
12.6	20.3	13B	US 64 Bus. east – Knightdale	Western end of US 64 Bus. concurrency
13.8	22.2	14	I-87 north / US 64 east / US 264 east – Rocky Mount, Wilson, Greenville	Eastern end of US 64 Bus. concurrency; western end of I-87/US 64 concurrency; western terminus of US 64 Bus.
14.7	23.7	15	Poole Road	
16.2	26.1	16	I-40 east / I-87 ends – Benson, Wilmington	Eastern end of I-87 concurrency; southern terminus of I-87
16.4	26.4	—	I-40 west / US 64 west – Durham	Eastern end of US 64 concurrency; eastern terminus; continuation as I-40/US 64
1.000 mi = 1.609 km; 1.000 km = 0.621 mi: Concurrency terminus; Incomplete access
