= North Carolina State University College of Veterinary Medicine =

Graduate school in Raleigh, North Carolina, US

Coordinates: 35.799158°N 78.704692°W

North Carolina State University College of Veterinary Medicine is an American educational institution located in Raleigh, North Carolina that offers master's and doctorate-level degree programs; interdisciplinary research in a range of veterinary and comparative medicine topics through centers, institutes, programs and laboratories; and external engagement through public service programs and activities.

== NC State Veterinary Hospital ==
The College provides the animal-owning public with veterinary medical services in 18 specialty clinics through its Veterinary Hospital. About 23,000 cases—primarily companion animals and horses—are diagnosed and treated in the Randall B. Terry, Jr. Companion Animal Veterinary Medical Center, Veterinary Health and Wellness Center, and Equine and Farm Veterinary Hospital & Field Services each year. Hospital clinicians have pioneered clinical canine bone marrow transplants and osseointegrated surgical implants for customized prosthetic limbs for dogs and cats.

== Academics ==
Located on NC State University Centennial Biomedical Campus (part of the Centennial Campus complex), the College has three departments: Department of Clinical Sciences, Department of Molecular Biomedical Sciences, and the Department of Population Health & Pathobiology. The College involves some 155 faculty, 400 staff members, and it enrolls more than 300 Doctor of Veterinary Medicine (DVM) students, 80 graduate students, and 75 interns and residents.

Academic degrees offered by the college include:

- Doctor of Veterinary Medicine
- Master of Science/Doctor of Philosophy in Comparative Biomedical Sciences (concentrations include: Cell Biology, Infectious Disease, Immunology, Neurosciences, Pathology, Pharmacology, and Population Medicine)
- Master of Science/Doctor of Philosophy in Fisheries, Wildlife, and Conservation Biology
- Master of Veterinary Public Health
- Combined DVM/MBA
- Combined DVM/PhD

There are six main focus areas in the College: companion animal medicine, food supply medicine, biomedical research, ecosystem health, equine medicine, and animal welfare. Through these areas, the College prepares the next generation of veterinarians and veterinarian scientists, conducts bench and clinical research to support animal and human health, addresses ecosystem and public health issues, helps protects the U.S. food supply, and promotes an appreciation of the changing animal-human bond.

The College is currently ranked third by the U.S. News & World Report among the 28 colleges of veterinary medicine in the U.S.

== Research ==
The overall goal of the College's research program is to provide solutions to problems of particular importance to North Carolina and to address problems of importance to society at large.

A component of these research activities, the Center for Comparative Medicine and Translational Research (CCMTR) is a community of more than 100 scientists who are involved in collaborative studies with government, private, and other academic researchers to advance the knowledge and practical applications that improve animal and human health. The CCMTR has eight research cores—allergic diseases, biostatistics, clinical genomics, comparative neurobiology, emerging and zoonotic diseases, mucosa pathophysiology, oncology, and stem cells—and focuses on taking knowledge from the laboratory to patient bedside, with an emphasis on diseases common to animals and humans.

== William Rand Kenan, Jr. Library of Veterinary Medicine ==
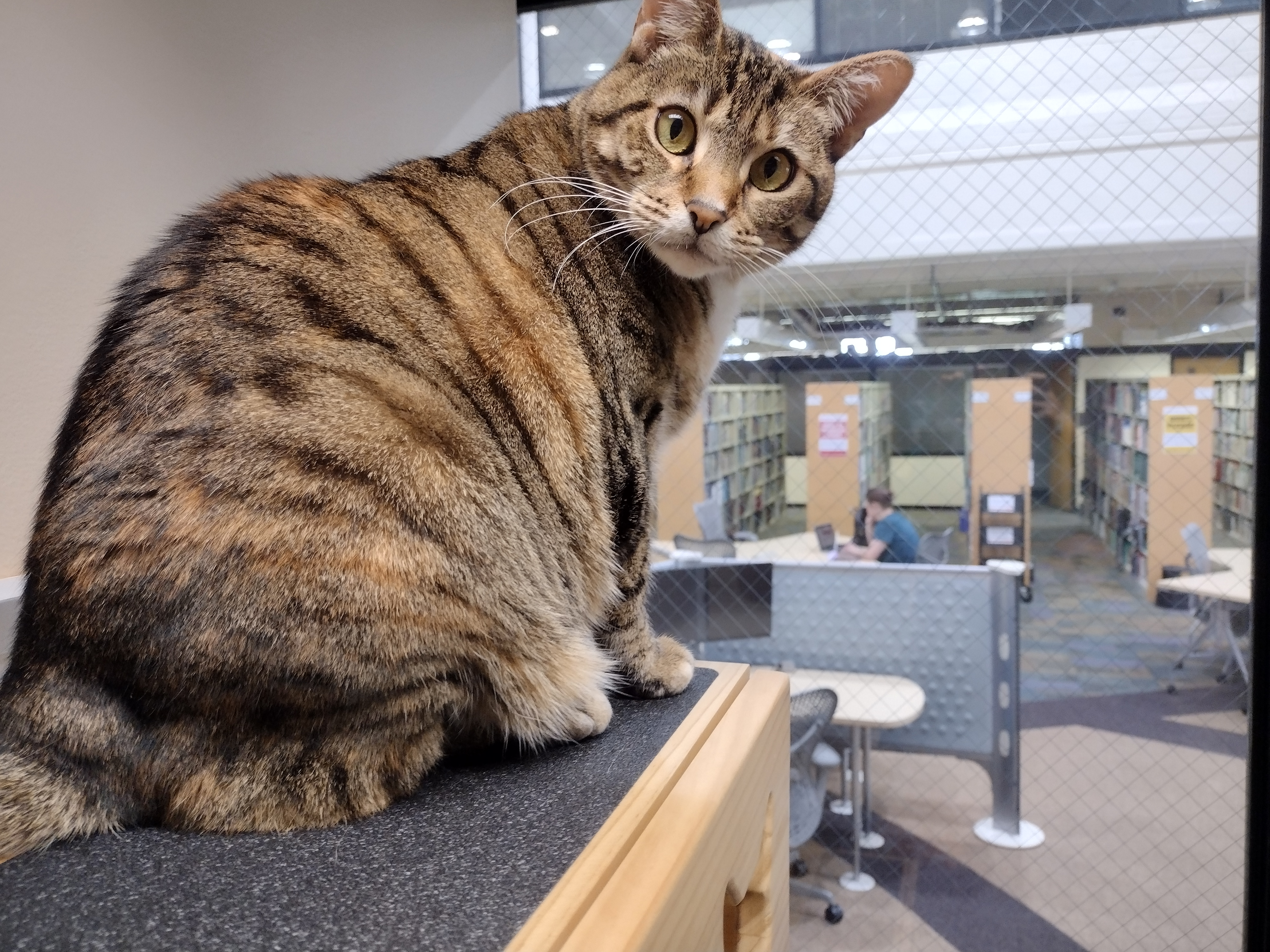
Chickpea, a domestic cat, is a resident of the College of Veterinary Medicine's library

The Veterinary Medicine Library at the College of Veterinary Medicine focuses on education and discovery in life sciences, veterinary medicine, and animal and human health. The library features several multipurpose and conference reservable spaces as well as a range of available technologies. As of the fall of 2025, the library is also home to the College of Veterinary Medicine Community Cat, Chickpea.

== Buildings & Facilities ==
The NCSU College of Veterinary Medicine is located on the 180-acre (0.73 km^{2}) Centennial Biomedical Campus, which is west of NC State's main campus and part of the university's research park and campus complex -- Centennial Campus. The campus consists of 20 buildings, including the CVM Research building, a 100,000-square-foot (9,300 m^{2}) facility where there are investigations in genomic sciences, gene therapy, vaccine development, cancer immuno-therapy, and genetic research. The Randall B. Terry, Jr. Companion Animal Veterinary Medical Center. completed in late 2010, the 110,000-square-foot (10,000 m^{2}) has more than double the size of the current Veterinary Teaching Hospital. The Teaching Animal Unit is a working farm located right on the College campus a few steps away from lecture halls and labs.

== Academic canine bone marrow transplantation ==
N.C. State is not the first school to do canine bone marrow transplant but they are the first to have it at a clinical academic setting. They are hoping to one day set up a bone marrow registry for dogs as well as philanthropic donors who will help dog owners with the cost of the procedure. There are several organizations that offer funding for the canine bone marrow transplant at NC State University. This service is no longer available.
