= Interstate 40 in North Carolina =

Interstate Highway in North Carolina, United States

Interstate 40
- Blue Star Memorial Highway
- I-40 highlighted in red

Route information
- Maintained by NCDOT
- Length: 420.21 mi (676.26 km)
- Existed: 1958–present
- NHS: Entire route

Major junctions
- West end: I-40 at the Tennessee state line
- I-26 / I-240 / US 74 in Asheville; I-77 in Statesville; I-74 in Winston-Salem; I-73 / I-840 / US 421 in Greensboro; I-85 in Hillsborough; I-440 / US 1 / US 64 in Raleigh; I-87 / I-440 / US 64 in Raleigh; I-42 / NC 540 Toll near Garner; I-95 near Benson; I-140 / NC 140 in Murraysville
- East end: US 117 / NC 132 near Wilmington

Location
- Country: United States
- State: North Carolina
- Counties: Haywood, Buncombe, McDowell, Burke, Catawba, Iredell, Davie, Forsyth, Guilford, Alamance, Orange, Durham, Wake, Johnston, Sampson, Duplin, Pender, New Hanover

Highway system
- Interstate Highway System; Main; Auxiliary; Suffixed; Business; Future; North Carolina Highway System; Interstate; US; State; Scenic
← NC 39	→ NC 41

Interstate 40 (I-40) is a part of the Interstate Highway System that travels 2,556.61 miles (4,114.46 km) from Barstow, California, to Wilmington, North Carolina. In North Carolina, I-40 travels 420.21 miles (676.26 km) across the entirety of the state from the Tennessee state line along the Pigeon River Gorge to U.S. Highway 117 (US 117) and North Carolina Highway 132 (NC 132) in Wilmington. I-40 is the longest Interstate Highway in North Carolina and is the only Interstate to completely span the state from west to east.

Traveling from west to east, I-40 connects the three major regions of North Carolina—Western North Carolina, the Piedmont, and Eastern North Carolina. In the Piedmont region, I-40 connects the Piedmont Triad and Research Triangle metropolitan regions. Included in these regions are the cities of Raleigh, Greensboro, Durham, and Winston-Salem which represent the second through fifth largest cities in the state, respectively. In addition, I-40 connects the cities of Asheville and Hickory in Western North Carolina, Wilmington in Eastern North Carolina, and many smaller communities along its route. The landscapes traversed by I-40 include the Blue Ridge Mountains, the foothills of Western North Carolina, suburban communities, and the urban core of several Piedmont cities, along with Eastern North Carolina farmland. There are five auxiliary Interstates in the state related to I-40: I-140, I-240, I-440, I-540, and I-840. I-40 formerly had one business loop which primarily ran through Winston-Salem and briefly was extended through Greensboro.

The freeway bears several names in addition to the I-40 designation. Throughout the state, the freeway is known as the Blue Star Memorial Highway, a name shared with multiple Interstates across the state. From the Guilford–Alamance county line to one mile (1.6 km) east of NC 54, in Graham, I-40 and I-85 is known as the Sam Hunt Freeway. From Orange County to Raleigh, I-40 is known as the Harriet Morehead Berry Freeway, John Motley Morehead III Freeway, Dan K. Moore Freeway, and Tom Bradshaw Freeway. I-40 is the James Harrington Freeway from US 70 to I-95. In Duplin County, a section of I-40 is known as the Henry L. Stevens Jr. Highway. From the Pender–New Hanover county line to the eastern terminus of I-40, the freeway is known as the Michael Jordan Highway.

I-40 was an original Interstate Highway planned in the Federal-Aid Highway Act of 1956. In North Carolina, the original highway was to run from the Tennessee state line to Greensboro where the freeway would end at I-85. In 1958, the first section of completed Interstate Highway in the state was I-40 along the East–West Expressway in Winston-Salem. I-40 received two extension approvals; the first in 1969 to I-95 to be routed in or near Smithfield and the second in 1984 to Wilmington. After 34 years since it first opened, the last section completed was the Winston-Salem Bypass in 1992. The highest point is at 2,786 feet (849 m), located at Swannanoa Gap, and the lowest point is at 15 feet (4.6 m), located at the Pender–New Hanover county line.

== Route description ==
I-40 travels through all of the diverse regions in North Carolina. Annual average daily traffic counts along the Interstate in 2023 reached a peak of 193,099 vehicles per day from Harrison Avenue (exit 287) to Wade Avenue in Raleigh. The lowest count was a total of 21,288 vehicles per day in a rural stretch of Pender County. All of I-40 is listed in the National Highway System, a network of roads important to the country's economy, defense, and mobility. I-40 is also designated as a Blue Star Memorial Highway throughout the state.

=== Western North Carolina ===
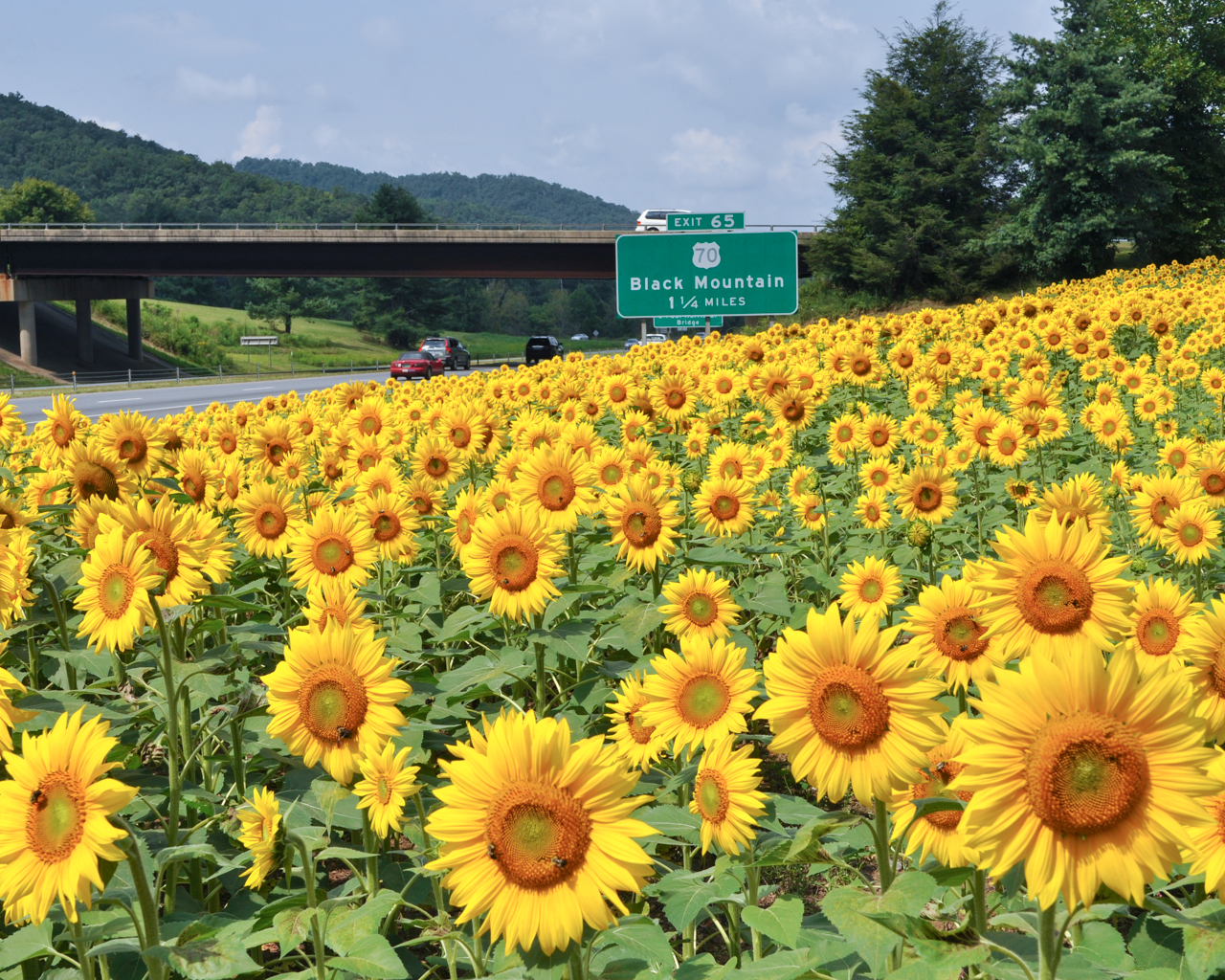
Sunflowers along I-40 westbound

I-40 enters North Carolina along the north banks of the Pigeon River at the foot of Snowbird Mountain. Winding in parallel with the river, I-40 goes through twin tunnels. When the tunnels opened in 1968, they were the first Interstate tunnels east of the Mississippi River. I-40 then proceeds through the Pigeon River Gorge for the next 16 miles (26 km). Just south of exit 7, I-40 uses another tunnel, for eastbound traffic only, through Hurricane Mountain. The westbound lanes use a rock cut through Hurricane Mountain. A short distance after the tunnel is the North Carolina Welcome Center. Immediately afterward is Waterville Lake, where there are a few at-grade intersections in this location, used as service access for Walters Dam and the Harmon Den Wildlife Management Area. I-40 continues toward Asheville. The Interstate then merges with US 74 (Great Smoky Mountains Expressway). I-40 and US 74 encounter the I-26/I-240 interchange, sometimes called Malfunction Junction, in the southwestern part of the city. The interchange is the current western terminus of I-240 and the original western terminus of I-26. I-40 then goes along the south side of Asheville, north of the Biltmore Estate toward Hickory. I-40 then has another interchange with I-240 before the Interstate leaves the Asheville area.

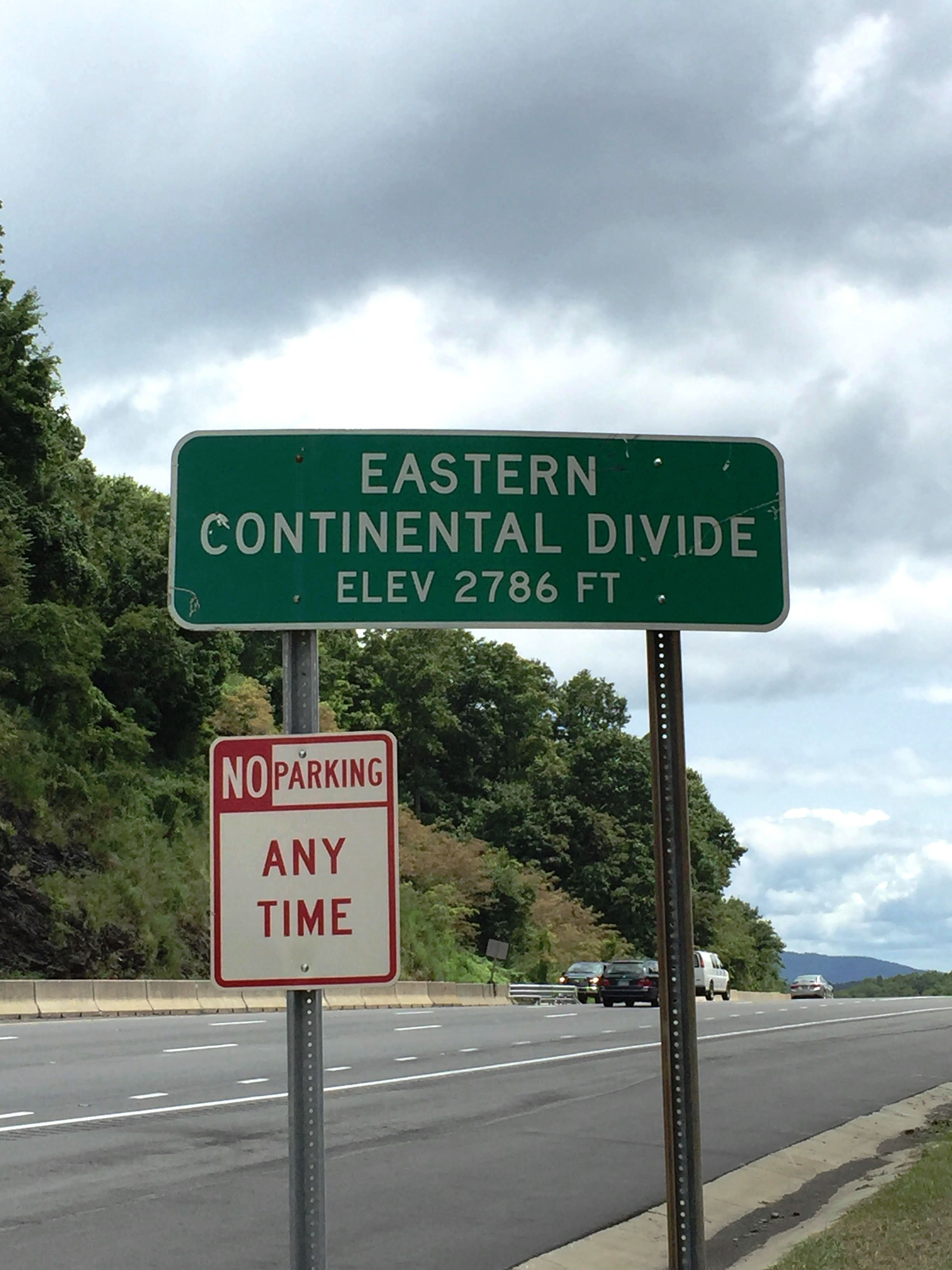
I-40 crossing the Eastern Continental Divide in western McDowell County

Shortly after it leaves Asheville, I-40 encounters a steep grade, Old Fort Mountain, with winding roads that pose a hazard to truck traffic. There are several runaway truck ramps on this part of the highway. This stretch is about six miles (9.7 km) long. I-40 goes south of Black Mountain and Marion and north of Conover. There, it crosses the Eastern Continental Divide and the southern tip of the Black Mountains. When I-40 enters Hickory, it has a clover interchange with US 321, providing access north to Hickory and south to Lincolnton and Gastonia. I-40 then heads south of Hickory and crosses the Catawba River on the Cecil H. Hoffman Bridge. After that, it enters Iredell County and passes Statesville north of the city. It has major interchanges with US 64 and US 21 before utilizing a partial turbine/cloverleaf interchange with I-77. This interchange was reconstructed to help alleviate congestion around the area.

=== Piedmont region ===
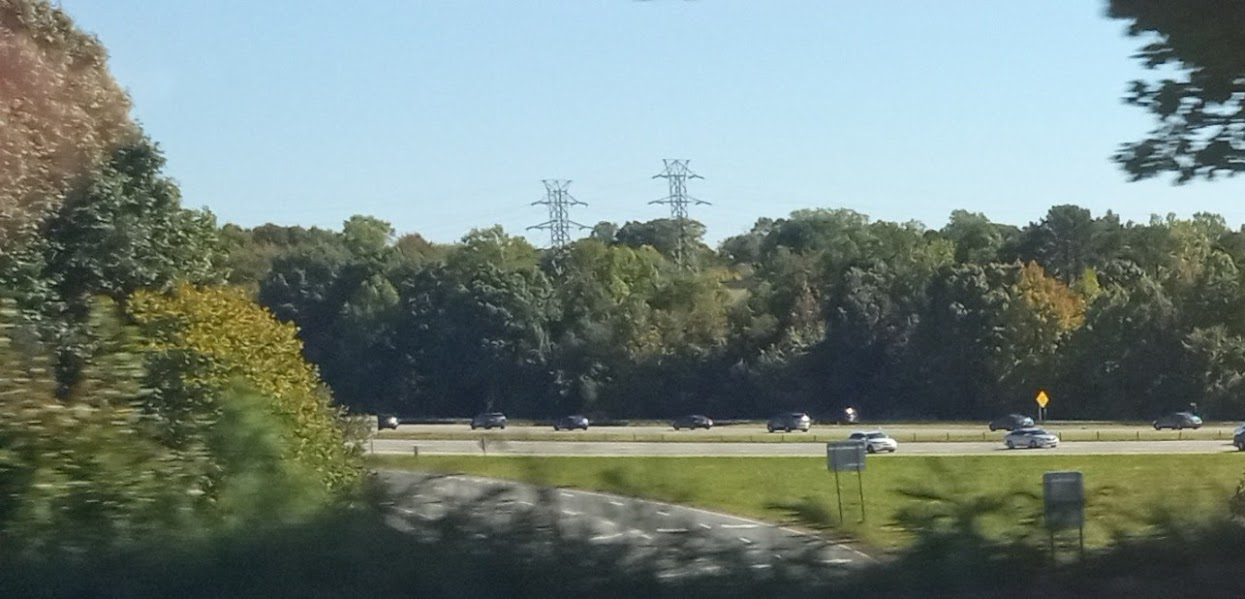
I-40 in Winston-Salem

I-40 heads northeast upon entering into the region, passing through Mocksville and Clemmons. From here, I-40 widens to six lanes upon entering into Winston-Salem. It has meets with a major interchange, the Salem Parkway, which carries US 421 and gives direct access to downtown Winston-Salem. Continuing through the southern areas of the Winston-Salem, I-40 bears a more eastern direction, passing Hanes Mall and the surrounding commercial developments. After passing the area, it has a major cloverleaf interchange with I-285/US 52/NC 8. It later meets I-74, which exits off to the south toward High Point. From here I-40 continues northeast bypassing most of Kernersville to the south shortly before meeting with US 421 shortly after passing the Guilford County line. US 421 runs a concurrency with I-40 into Greensboro.

I-40 heads into the Greensboro city limits, passing an interchange with NC 68, which gives access to the PTI Airport. This happens shortly before reaching the large I-73/US 421/I-840 interchange. This interchange is the east end of the US 421 concurrency with I-40 as well as the western terminus of I-840. From here, I-40 heads through southwestern Greensboro passing several interchanges that connects to various major areas in the city, including a junction with US 70 which carries Wendover Avenue. The interstate Four Seasons Town Centre before having a large interchange with US 220. US 29/US 70 all merge into I-40/US 220 for a major concurrency one mile (1.6 km) after the interchange with US 220. The Interstate is generally six-lanes throughout in this area.

This 2.5-mile (4.0 km) corridor with concurrent routes ends in the east at the US 29/US 220/Martin Luther King Jr. Boulevard junction. Both the beginning and ending interchanges of this corridor are quite unusual in design and are often operating at above full capacity, leading to frequent traffic jams and incidents.

I-40 through Greensboro officially bears the name Preddy Boulevard. The nickname "Death Valley" has been given to the area of I-40 where I-40 and I-85 Business (I-85 Bus.) splits. The locals have given that area that name because of the high number of deaths due to car crashes in that area. One major problem with the highway is that the US 29/US 70/US 220 southbound lanes merge from the right and exit to the left. Thus, through traffic on I-40 west and US 29 south (a major route from Virginia to Charlotte) must all merge to the other side of the freeway. A study conducted by state traffic engineers from May 1, 2006, to April 30, 2008, (the period between the I-85 relocation and I-40's relocation) concluded that "the Death Valley area" had an accident rate "higher than average for urban interstates [...] but the [route] was safe anyway". There were no fatalities during the study period, but a large number of rear-end collisions.

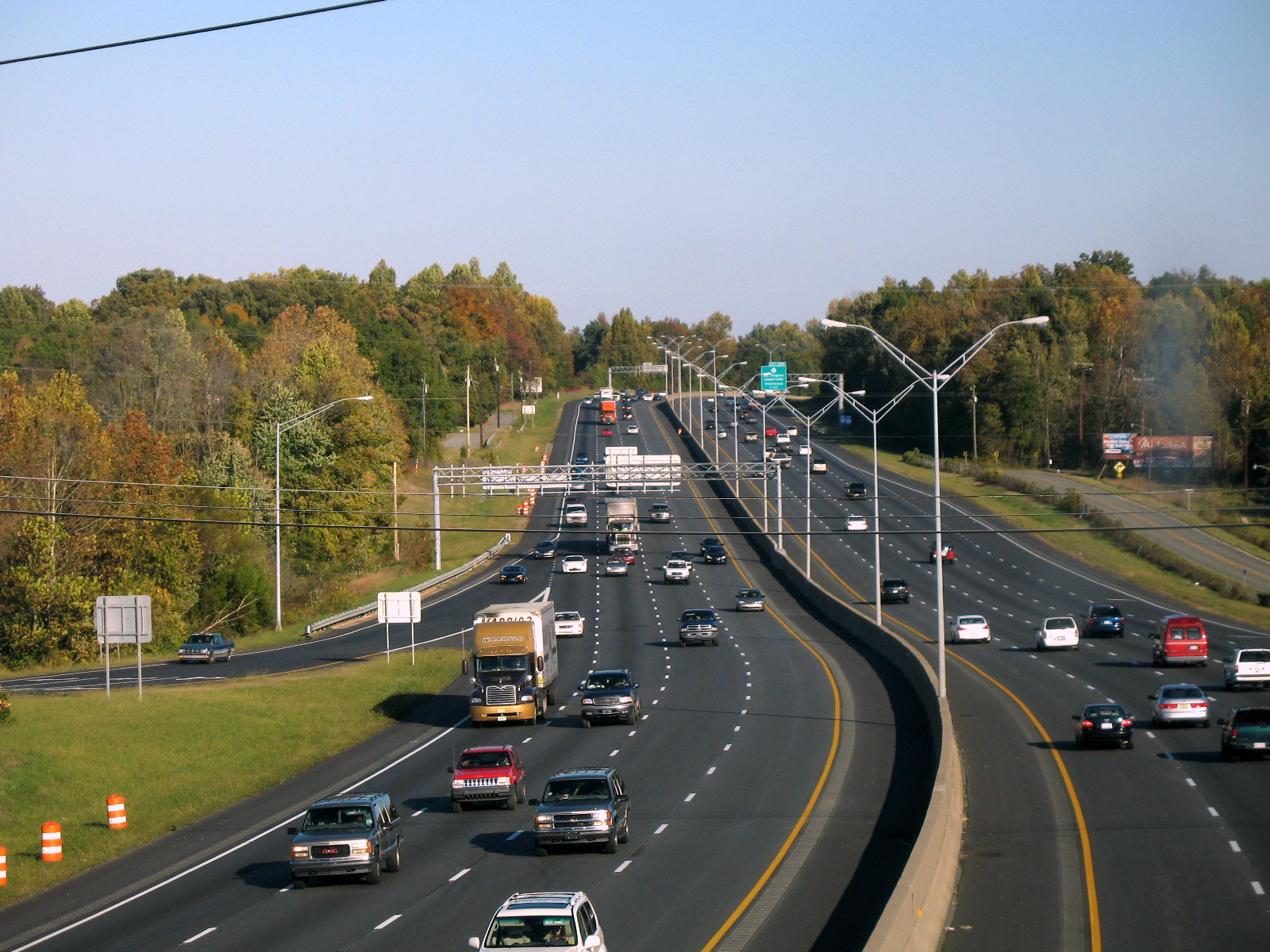
I-40/I-85 through Burlington

I-40 merges with I-85 east of Greensboro. I-40 and I-85 have a 31-mile (50 km) concurrency through Guilford, Alamance, and Orange counties. The concurrency section uses I-85 exit numbers instead of I-40 exit numbers. The section goes south of Elon, Burlington, Graham, and Mebane, passing through generally suburban development. I-40 breaks ways from I-85 at exit 163, south of Hillsborough, where I-85 continues east.

After I-40 breaks away from I-85, it heads in a very southeasterly direction toward Chapel Hill, going through rural areas and a forest. I-40 parallels NC 86 until NC 86 crosses I-40 at exit 266. The interstate then passes more suburban areas as well as northern Chapel Hill and through southern Durham. I-40 enters Research Triangle Park (RTP) after an interchange with I-885 and NC 885. The Interstate varies in width, from four to eight lanes, depending on the location. It serves as a major thoroughfare between Raleigh, Cary, and Durham (the other being US 70). After leaving the Research Triangle area, I-40 has an interchange with I-540 near Raleigh–Durham International Airport. Several I-40 exits serve Raleigh–Durham, including Aviation Parkway, Airport Boulevard, and I-540. I-40 continues to head southeast toward downtown Raleigh. I-40 is routed north of Cary and south of William B. Umstead State Park. At Wade Avenue, I-40 bears right to head south. It then has an interchange with I-440/US 1/US 64 at exits 293A and 293B. I-40 then runs a concurrency with US 64 along the south side of Raleigh. The concurrency ends at an interchange with I-87/I-440/US 64 at exit 301, where I-40 turns south.

=== Eastern North Carolina ===
Beyond exit 301, I-40 follows a primarily south-southeasterly routing to Wilmington. It departs Raleigh and runs along through eastern Garner between Jones Sausage Road (exit 303) and White Oak Road. I-40 meets US 70 in Garner at exit 306. Additionally, I-40 begins to parallel NC 50 starting near exit 306 in Garner and continuing through Kenansville. I-40 travels 4.1 miles (6.6 km) south to exit 309 with I-42 and NC 540, where I-42 heads eastward toward Selma and New Bern. South of exit 309, I-40 leaves Wake County and enters Johnston County. As the highway leaves suburban regions surrounding Raleigh, it interchanges with NC 42 (exit 312), NC 210 (exit 319), and NC 242 (exit 325) which provide access to Clayton, Angier, and Benson. I-40 travels to the east of Benson, crossing over US 301, but provides no access to the highway. Immediately south of US 301, I-40 meets I-95 at exit 328, a modified cloverleaf interchange. This interchange was redesigned to help smoothen out the driving surface from the I-40 bridges to I-95.

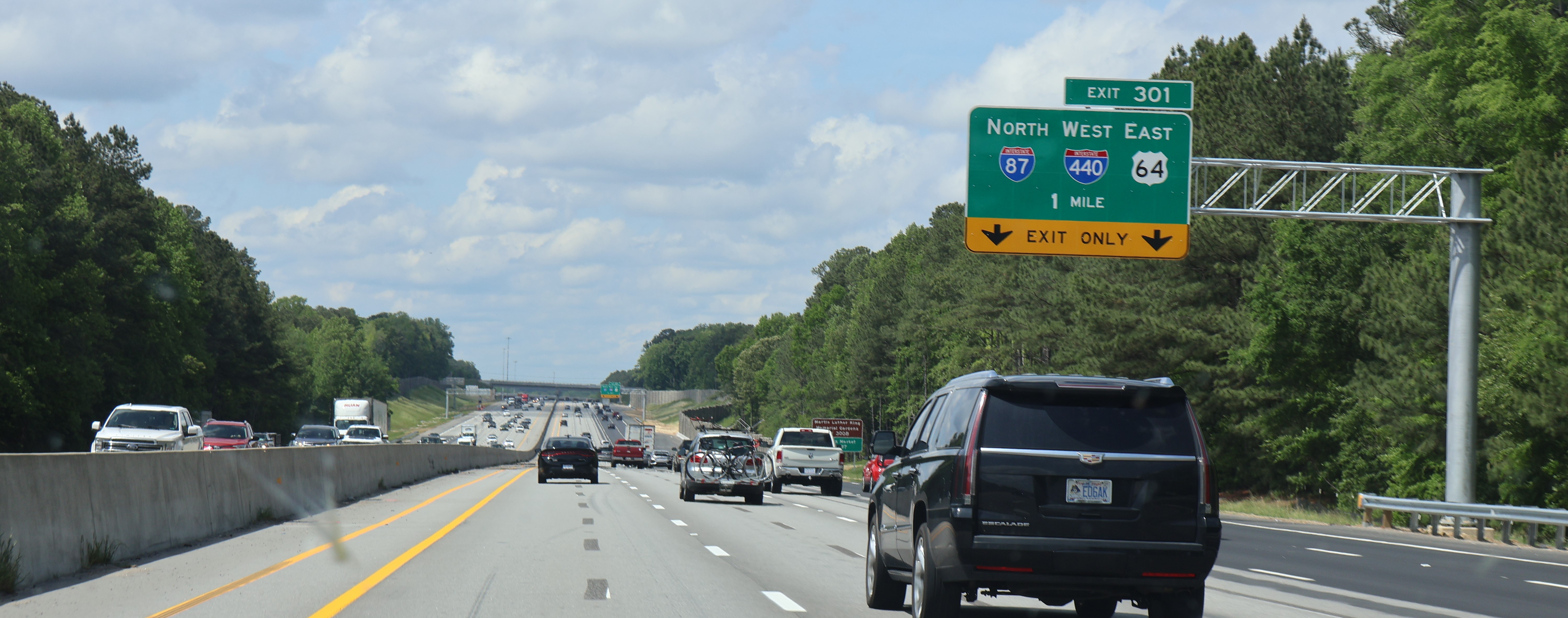
I-40 westbound at exit 301

I-40 continues southeast through rural Johnston County farmland, meeting NC 96 (exit 334) north of Peacocks Crossroads. Approaching Newton Grove, I-40 leaves Johnston County and crosses into Sampson County. I-40 travels along the southwestern side of Newton Grove, interchanging with NC 50 and NC 55 at exit 341 and US 701 at exit 343. US 13 crosses over I-40 in the vicinity of Newton Grove, but there is not a dedicated interchange. I-40 continues southeast of Newton Grove through rural Sampson County. It meets US 117 Connector and NC 403 at exit 355 southwest of Faison, and I-40 begins to parallel US 117 near the exit. I-40 departs Sampson County and enters Duplin County approximately four miles (6.4 km) southeast of exit 355. It continues through Duplin County for approximately five miles (8.0 km) before meeting NC 24 and NC 24 Bus. (exit 364) west of Warsaw. At the interchange, NC 24 begins an 8.4 miles (13.5 km) concurrency with I-40 to the southeast. An interchange with US 117 (exit 369) is located south of Warsaw and I-40 begins to travel around Magnolia to the east. NC 24 departs the freeway at NC 903 (exit 373) which provides access to Kenansville. After the interchange, I-40 primarily turns to the south, bypassing Teachey, Rose Hill, and Wallace to the east. Interchanges with Charity Road (exit 380), NC 11 (exit 384), and NC 41 (exit 385) provide access to these towns and to US 117. I-40 begins to run parallel to the Northeast Cape Fear River and enters Pender County after crossing Rockfish Creek near Wallace.

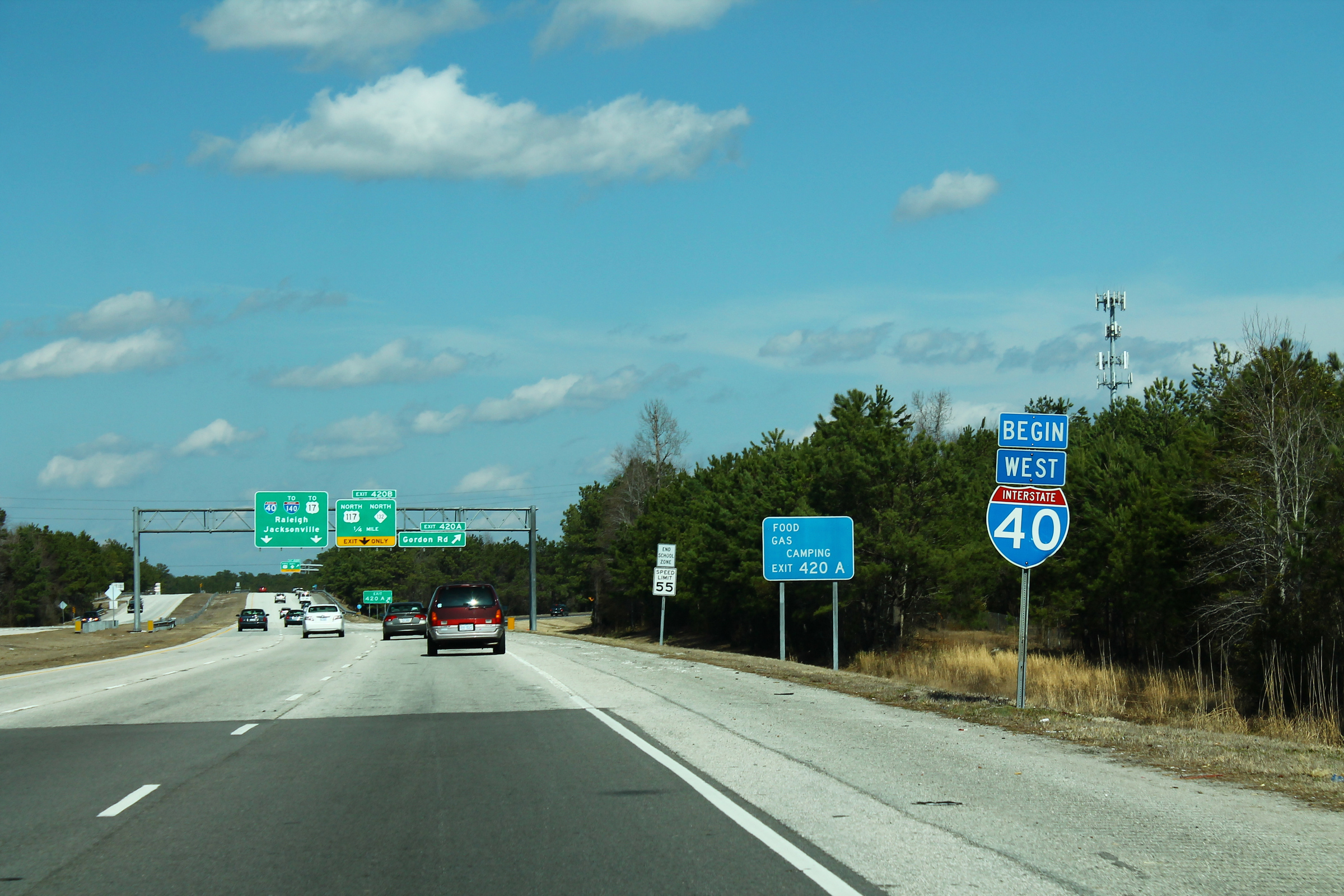
Eastern terminus of I-40 at US 117 and NC 132 looking westbound

The highway once again meets US 117, at an interchange south of Wallace, and crosses to the western side of US 117. I-40 remains on the western side of US 117 for 5.6 miles (9.0 km) until it crosses over I-40 north of Burgaw. The highway bypasses Burgaw to the east, meeting NC 53 (exit 398) east of the town. Continuing south, I-40 once again meets NC 210 at exit 408 near Rocky Point and then crosses the Northeast Cape Fear River into New Hanover County where it picks up the name "Michael Jordan Freeway". I-40 passes to the east of Castle Hayne and interchanges with Holly Shelter Road at exit 412. An interchange with I-140 and NC 140 is located 2.5 miles (4.0 km) south of Holly Shelter Road at exit 416. From I-140 and NC 140, I-40 continues south passing east of Olsen Park before turning to the southwest and meeting US 117 and NC 132 at exit 420. Eastbound I-40 runs concurrently with US 117 and NC 132 for 0.2 miles (0.32 km) beyond the exit, while westbound I-40 is concurrent with US 117 and NC 132 for approximately 0.5 miles (0.80 km) due to the design of the interchange. The eastern terminus of I-40 is located at US 117 and NC 132 north of Kings Grant Road in Wilmington, where both US 117 and NC 132 drop the concurrency. The highway continues south as North College Road toward US 74, the University of North Carolina Wilmington, and Carolina Beach.

=== Dedicated and memorial names ===
The freeway bears several names in addition to the I-40 designation. Throughout the state, the freeway is known as the Blue Star Memorial Highway, a name shared with multiple Interstates across the state. From the Guilford–Alamance county line to one mile (1.6 km) east of NC 54, in Graham, I-40/I-85 is known as the Sam Hunt Freeway. The freeway is known as the Harriet Morehead Berry Freeway through Orange County, named for a leader in the Good Roads Movement in North Carolina. Between US 15/US 501 in Chapel Hill to I-885/NC 885 in Durham, I-40 is known as the John Motley Morehead III Freeway who was a noted philanthropist and graduate from the University of North Carolina at Chapel Hill. I-40 is the Dan K. Moore Freeway through the Research Triangle Park. The section is named after Dan K. Moore who was the 66th governor of North Carolina. From the Wade Avenue Extension to US 70 in Garner, the freeway is known as the Tom Bradshaw Freeway, named after the 33rd mayor of Raleigh. I-40 is the James Harrington Freeway from US 70 to I-95. In Johnston, south of I-95, and Sampson counties, I-40 is dedicated to Robert D. Warren Sr. who was a former State Director of Driver's Licenses and State Senator from the area. In Duplin County, a section of I-40 6.95 miles (11.18 km) north of NC 24 west of Warsaw to 6.95 miles (11.18 km) south of NC 24 is known as the Henry L. Stevens Jr. Highway, who was a commander of the American Legion and a North Carolina Superior Court judge. From the Pender–New Hanover county line to the eastern terminus of I-40, the freeway is known as the Michael Jordan Highway, named after the famous basketball player who grew up in Wilmington and was a graduate of the University of North Carolina at Chapel Hill. I-40 has also been given the name Tobacco Road by college sports fans because the freeway links up the four North Carolina schools in the Atlantic Coast Conference.

On February 1, 2024, I-40 was named the Jimmy Capps Freeway, after Jimmy Capps, a country music singer and songwriter from Benson.

== History ==
Authorized by the Federal-Aid Highway Act of 1956, North Carolina was originally allocated 714 miles (1,149 km) for their share of the Interstate Highway System; 219 miles (352 km) of which was subsequently allocated for a route from the Tennessee state line, through Asheville and Winston-Salem, to Greensboro. Designated as I-40, it became the first Interstate in the state after opening on a completed three-mile-long (4.8 km) section in Winston-Salem in 1958. For the next 32 years, I-40 was constructed and extended twice to its current routing from the Pigeon River Gorge to Wilmington.

=== Predecessor highways ===
The first major overland transportation corridors in North Carolina were the Indian trading paths. One of these routes, the Rutherford's Trace, followed the path of modern I-40. In 1921, the North Carolina Highway System was established, with NC 10, nicknamed the "Central Highway", designated on the route between Asheville and Greensboro. By the time US 70 was established in 1926 and placed on concurrency on all of NC 10, nearly all of the route was either paved or oil-treated. After World War II, the federal government began planning on a new Interregional Highway system, as mandated by the Federal-Aid Highway Act of 1944, and released a proposed National System of Interstate Highways in 1947, which included a route that followed loosely to US 70 from the Tennessee state line to Greensboro. After years of planning and the passing of the Federal-Aid Highway Act of 1956, which established the route between Tennessee and Greensboro, the American Association of State Highway and Transportation Officials (AASHTO) approved the I-40 designation in 1957.

=== Initial design and construction ===
In 1953, a contract for about $1.3 million was awarded for a 6.5-mile (10.5 km) two-lane road in Haywood County, along the Pigeon River which would connect existing highways to Tennessee. Officials in both states eventually agreed on the Pigeon River route for an interstate highway, even though a route along the French Broad River was being considered. In 1958, the project along the Pigeon River was the first construction job in the country that was designated specifically for I-40. That same year, the first two sections of I-40 opened: the first was the three-mile-long (4.8 km) East–West Expressway in Winston-Salem; the second was from US 421 in Kernersville to US 29/US 70 in Greensboro. In both cases, these first freeways were constructed a couple of years prior for US 158 and US 421, respectively, and did not benefit from the 1956 act; as a result, in 1988, the state was able to convince the Federal Highway Administration (FHWA) to build the Winston-Salem Bypass. Between Ridgecrest and Old Fort, US 70 along Youngs Ridge was four lanes as of 1954; I-40, however, was not officially designated until 1982, after additional highway improvements, including additional widening, runaway truck ramps, and warning devices.

In 1960, I-40 made three expansions: in Burke County, from Dysartsville Road (SR 1129) to Hildebran (connecting to US 64/US 70 along I-40 Access Road Southeast (SR 1890)); from NC 16 in Conover to NC 90 in Statesville; and from NC 801 near Advance to the US 158/US 421 split east of Winston-Salem. In 1961, I-40 extended west from Dysartsville Road to NC 226 near Marion. In Statesville, I-40 extended east along a completed widening project of the US 64 Bypass, between NC 90 to US 64. In 1962, I-40 extended west from NC 226 near Marion to link-up with US 70 near Old Fort. In 1963, the gap between Winston-Salem and Kernersville was completed. In 1964, I-40 opened a 12-mile (19 km) segment from east of Clyde (using the freeway connector from US 19/US 23) to Wiggins Road (SR 1200). In 1967, I-40 opened a 3.8-mile (6.1 km) segment through the Biltmore Estate from NC 191 to US 25. In 1968 and after 10 years of construction, I-40 opened a 20-mile (32 km) segment from the Tennessee state line to US 276 in Cove Creek. In November of same year, the North Carolina State Highway Commission (NCSHC) submitted a request to the Bureau of Public Roads (BPR) to extend I-40 east of Greensboro to Raleigh via RTP. In 1969, both BPR and AASHTO approved the extension, allowing I-40 to continue east of Durham through Raleigh to Smithfield. Also in the same year, I-40 was extended west from NC 191 to connect with I-26 and end at US 19/US 23 in Enka. In 1970, I-40 extended west from NC 801 near Advance to US 64 near Mocksville.

In 1971, two gaps were completed: Wiggins Road (SR 1200) to US 19/US 23 in Enka; and US 64 in Statesville to US 64 near Mocksville. In July, NCSHC finalized a plan for I-40's routing east of Durham to Smithfield, with an estimated cost of $75 million (equivalent to $456 million in 2025). In December, new freeway opened between Davis Drive (SR 1999) in RTP to US 1/US 64 (Raleigh Beltline) in Raleigh; I-40 was added along seven miles (11 km) between Davis Drive and Harrison Avenue (SR 1654), while east of Harrison Avenue (future Wade Avenue) was signed "To I-40". In 1972, I-40 extended east from US 25 in Asheville to Porters Cove Road (SR 2838) in Oteen; the extension bypassed both US 25A and US 74, where interchanges were built in 1999 and 1973, respectively. In 1973, I-40 and the Durham Freeway (future NC 147; now I-885) were connected in RTP. In 1974, a gap was completed between US 276 in Cove Creek to the freeway connector (future Great Smoky Mountains Expressway) near Clyde. I-40 also extended east from Porters Cove Road in Oteen to Patton Cove Road (SR 2740) in Swannanoa. In 1976, a gap of I-40 was completed between Henry River Road (SR 1002) in Hildebran and NC 16 in Conover. In April 1978, after years of debate on where I-40 should be routed east of I-95, either Morehead City or Wilmington, the North Carolina Department of Transportation (NCDOT) approved a corridor location between Raleigh and Wilmington. The discussions on its routing started since the initial extension in 1969 and arguments from several area groups why the routing should go to their port city. In the end, the routing approval to Wilmington came with a caveat to build new freeway in parallel to US 117 instead of a full upgrade of US 421 as several in the region supported.

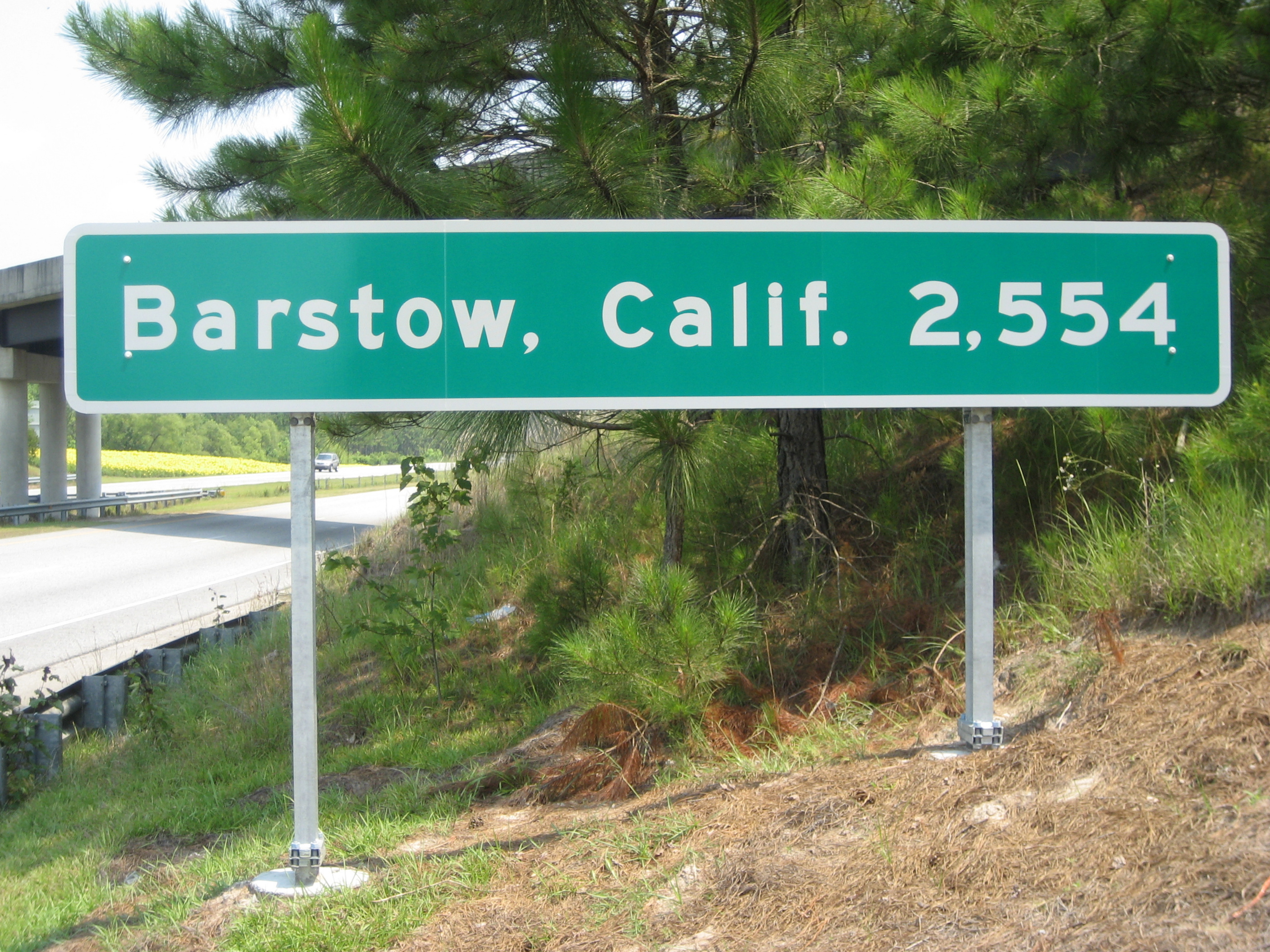
Barstow, California, distance sign near Wilmington. This sign was permanently removed in 2009 after being repeatedly stolen.

In 1979, I-40 was extended east from Patton Cove Road in Swannanoa to US 70 in Ridgecrest, and in 1982, it was designated in concurrency with US 70 along Youngs Ridge between Ridgecrest and Old Fort; this officially completed the original I-40 routing from Tennessee to Greensboro. In 1984, I-40 was extended in Raleigh from Wade Avenue (exit 289), along the Tom Bradshaw Freeway, to the Cliff Benson Beltline (exit 301). Also same year, AASHTO approved of designation of I-40 between Wallace and Wilmington, currently under construction at the time. By 1985, construction began on a 22-mile (35 km) project, connecting the Durham Freeway in the RTP with I-85 west of Hillsborough at an estimated cost of $103 million (equivalent to $261 million in 2025). In 1985, I-40 was placed on new 19-mile (31 km) section between US 117 (exit 390) near Willard and NC 210 (exit 408) near Rocky Point. In 1986, I-40 was extended west from the Durham Freeway (exit 279) to NC 55 (exit 278) in the RTP; I-40 was also extended east to its current eastern terminus at US 117/NC 132 (exit 420) in Wilmington. In 1987, I-40 was extended west from US 117 (exit 390) near Willard to NC 41 (exit 385) near Tin City. In 1988, I-40 was extended west to US 15/US 501 (exit 270) in Chapel Hill and east to US 70 (exit 306) in Garner. In October, then-Governor James G. Martin announced federal approval of $114.1 million (equivalent to $268 million in 2025) for I-40 to be relocated around Winston-Salem. In 1989, I-40 was extended west to I-85 (exit 259) west of Hillsborough and east to I-95 (exit 328) in Benson. By 1990, I-40 was extended west from NC 41 (exit 385) in Tin City to US 117 (exit 369) near Warsaw. On June 29, 1990, with a ribbon-cutting by Governor Martin, I-40 was connected between Raleigh and Wilmington, providing improved access with the Port of Wilmington with the rest of the state. At around this time, a standard distance sign near the start of the westbound section of I-40 in Wilmington indicates the distance to Barstow, California, as 2,554 miles (4,110 km). In December, AASHTO approved the I-40 designation between Raleigh and Wallace; and in January 1991, NCDOT certified the designation. The final gap of I-40 was completed when it was designated along existing I-85 from Greensboro to west of Hillsborough c. 1992.

=== Since completion ===
By the end of the 20th century, I-40 had experienced notable expansions and modernizations on its route. During the 1980s and 1990s, modernizations were done on the Piedmont stretches. The East-West Expressway which carried I-40 through central Winston-Salem, had stretches that both was built to 1950s Interstate Highway standards and predating the system entirely, leading to notable congestion when all combined. After a study with the city and state, decisions to build a new stretch was concluded, rather than widening and modernizing the freeway through the area, the state lobbied the Federal Highway Administration (FHWA) to allow them new roadway, arguing that since some this section predated the 1956 Act, it never received federal highway dollars for its development and construction, thus I-40 was technically incomplete in Winston-Salem. In October 1988, the group were able to convince the FHWA, and Governor James G. Martin announced federal approval of $114.1 million for I-40 to be relocated onto the new bypass. By the end of 1992, the 20.89-mile (33.62 km) new stretch was completed and opened and I-40 was officially rerouted onto the new stretch. The new stretch spanned from the then existing US 421 split in southwestern Winston-Salem, to Colfax west of Greensboro. This new stretch was at more recent Interstate standards, and was four-to-six lanes wide. The East–West Expressway was given the new designation as Interstate 40 Business.

In 1989, work began on a renovating the 35-mile (56 km) stretch between Alamance and Orange counties, included in this work was widening it from four to eight lanes. The work was carried out in phases. This was a part of a previous renovation in the 1960s, that transformed the original Super-2, which was also originally constructed for US 70, to Interstate standards, though experiencing the flaws from the preliminary era of those standards. By 1996, it had been competed at the cost of $175 million.(equivalent to $331 million in 2025) By 1997, Interstate 40 in Greensboro between west of the infamous former Interstate 85 split, to Wendover Avenue, was renovated to most of the same standards, as the other Piedmont renovations.

In December 2004, a 10.6-mile (17.1 km) widening project was completed from US 15/US 501 (exit 270) in Durham to NC 147 (now I-885/NC 885; exit 279) in RTP. The project expanded lanes from four to six lanes. In March 2005, construction crews returned for eight weeks to replace asphalt used in the widening project, which began to deteriorate not long after the lanes opened to the public. The paving mistakes, however, were more severe, and NCDOT contracted Lane Construction Corp to replace all the bad concrete used in the botch widening project, at a cost of $21.7 million (equivalent to $34.3 million in 2025).

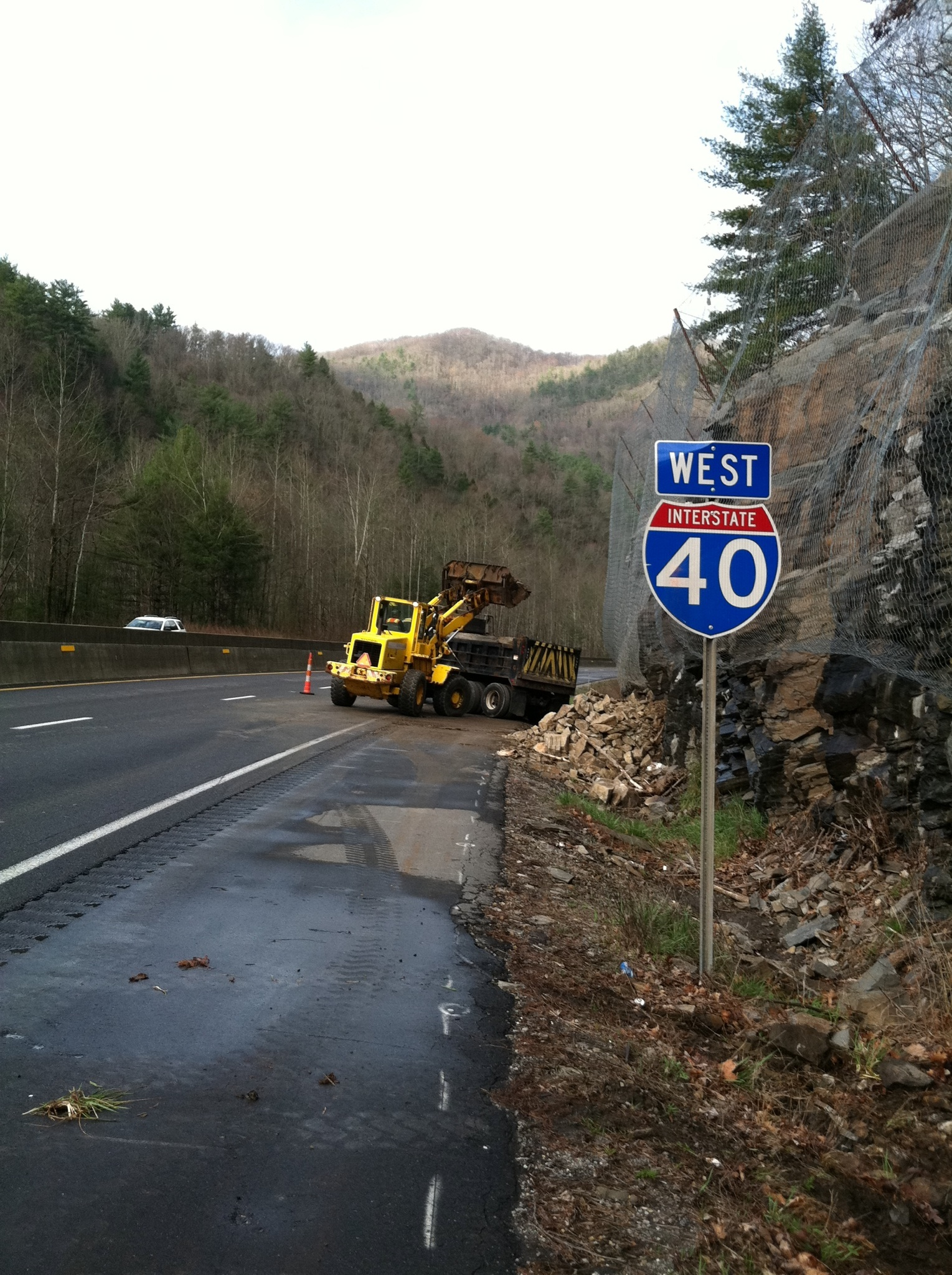
Crews clearing the westbound lanes from the 2012 rockslide

The first section of I-40 in North Carolina is the section that travels through the Pigeon River Gorge in Haywood County. Known locally as simply "The Gorge", this part of I-40 cuts a path from the Tennessee state line to Waynesville. This section of the Interstate is curvy and tends to become a bit narrow in some places when compared to other portions of the highway. Because much of the road was cut through mountainside and along the river, concrete retaining walls have been built on both sides of the road and in the median, cutting down on the width of the breakdown lanes. Coupled with speeding vehicles, the thick fog that tends to plague the area, winter weather, and little room to maneuver in case of accident, this area has become notorious for its severe and many times fatal accidents being twice the average of any other Interstate Highway in North Carolina. Even some minor accidents have been known to tie up traffic in this area because there is little room to move accidents off or to the side of the road with the terrain. Speeding semitrucks have led to many accidents. In 2001 and 2003, two state troopers were killed in two separate accidents by speeding trucks that drifted off the road and hit their police car conducting a traffic stop. This led the North Carolina State Highway Patrol to crack down on speeding tractor trailers and speeders in general through the area. This portion of the highway is also notorious for rockslides and rocks falling onto the highway. The main cause is that sections of the highway have been built on the north side of the Pigeon River, where the rock stratums foliate toward the highway. In 1985, a severe rockslide buried the westbound entrance to one of two tunnels that carry the highway through the gorge. Repair of the slide area and the tunnel required shifting westbound traffic to the eastbound tunnel, while eastbound traffic was diverted onto a temporary viaduct around the tunnels. In July 1997, a rockslide near the Tennessee state line closed the entire road for nearly three months. In 2009, a large rockslide at milemarker 2.6 along I-40 near the Tennessee state line shut down the freeway for several weeks. While the slide only caused minor injuries, it shut down I-40 in both directions.

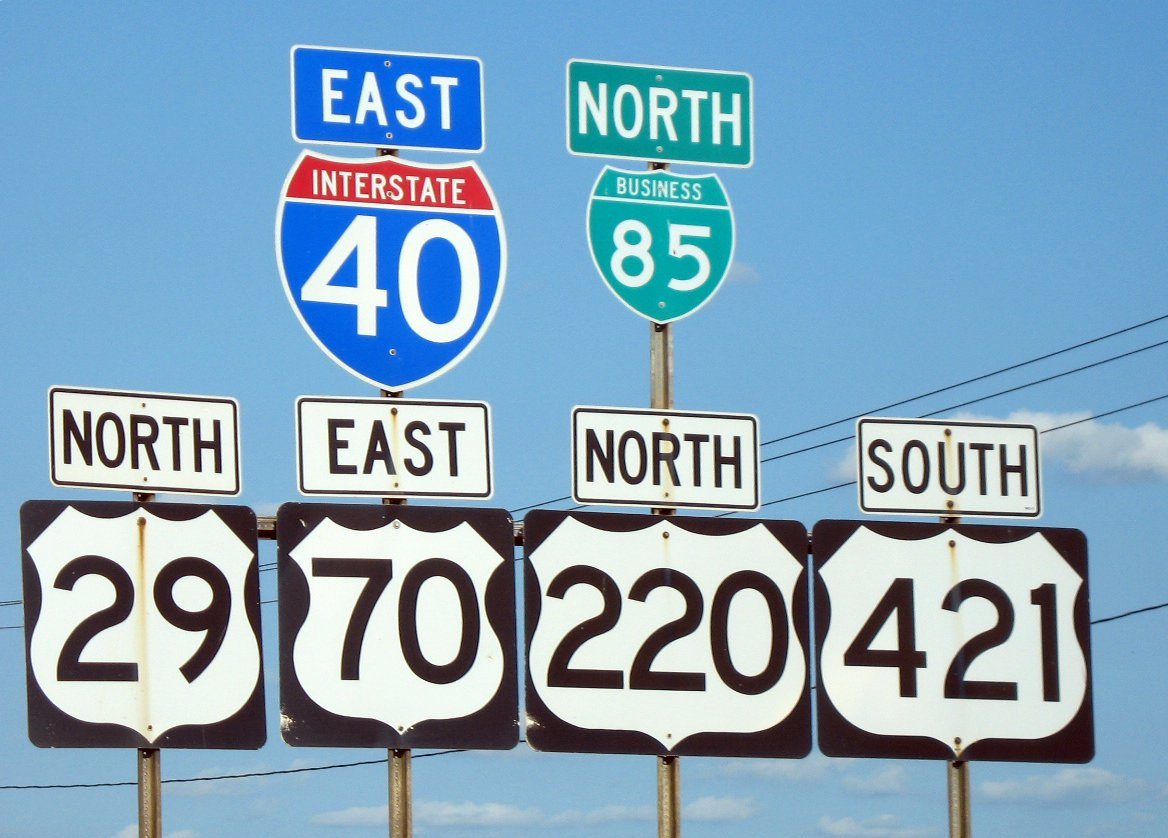
The six routes of Death Valley in 2006. US 220 and US 421 were rerouted in 2008 and 2009, respectively.

In February 2008, I-40 was relocated onto the southern section Greensboro Urban Loop, marking the first change to I-40 since it was rerouted onto the Winston-Salem Bypass in 1992. At a cost of $122 million (equivalent to $179 million in 2025), the relocation to the Greensboro Urban Loop was constructed by Archer Western Contractors of Atlanta and took four years to complete. NCDOT Secretary Lyndo Tippett said that "the opening of the Greensboro Western Urban Loop is a major step in improving the mobility of the Triad region" and that "the highway will provide better access for motorists in and around Greensboro, as well as those traveling between the eastern and western areas of our state". The new routing was placed in concurrency with I-73, while its original alignment became an extension of former I-40 Bus. The glowing sentiment the NCDOT secretary gave on the new I-40 routing was not reciprocated, however. NCDOT received many complaints by local residents and motorists on the confusion between "Blue" 40 and "Green" 40. Greensboro residents also had concerns with the resulting increased traffic and noise. On September 12, 2008, seven months after the initial switch and in agreement with Greensboro DOT and the FHWA, I-40 was rerouted to its original route through the city, I-40 Bus. was decommissioned, and I-73 and I-85 were left as the only Interstates signed along the loop. Exit numbers on the western segment of the loop were to be replaced with I-73 exit numbers; while exit numbers along I-40 Bus. would be changed over to I-40 exit numbers. At a cost around $300,000 (equivalent to $437,000 in 2025), all signage was replaced by July 1, 2009. In November 2009, US 421 was rerouted onto the Urban Loop, replacing most of I-40's brief alignment around Greensboro. The current alignment of I-40 is four miles (6.4 km) shorter than the 2008 Urban Loop routing and is the quicker route for any vehicle consistently traveling at the posted speed limits.

In 2011, an eight-mile (13 km) widening project was completed between Harrison Avenue (exit 287) and Gorman Street (exit 295) in Raleigh. At a cost of $49 million (equivalent to $69.1 million in 2025), the project expanded lanes from four to six lanes.

Begun in 2013, an extensive project known as "Fortify" (a play on the route number "40") overhauled I-40 along the southern edge of Raleigh, from the I-40/US 1/US 64 interchange (exit 293) near Crossroads Plaza in Cary through the I-40/I-440 split (exit 301) in Southeast Raleigh, including the easternmost two miles (3.2 km) of I-440 as well. The project necessitated a complete teardown and rebuild of the roadway, widening of the roadway, rehabilitation and widening of bridges and overpasses along the entire route, and extension and widening of several highly congested exit and entrance ramps. The project was divided into two phases, the first (completed in mid-2015) was a rebuilding and repaving of I-40 and I-440 from I-40 exit 301 to I-440 exit 14. The second phase, completed in late 2018, was the more extensive rebuild of I-40 from exit 293 to exit 301.

In Statesville, the I-40/I-77 interchange (exit 152), originally built as a cloverleaf in the late 1960s, was upgraded to increase capacity and improve safety. The initial estimated cost for the entire project is $251 million (equivalent to $347 million in 2025) with construction started in March 2012. The first phase, completed in mid-2019, involved the widening of I-40 from four to six lanes. The second phase, begun in 2020, involves a similar widening of I-77 and the reconstruction of the interchange into a partial turbine interchange. The original completion date was supposed to be late 2022. The completion date was rescheduled to late 2023. The $260-million project, including widening of a total of 7.5 miles (12.1 km) of both highways to eight lanes, was essentially completed December 22, 2023, with all lanes opened, but cold weather delayed further resurfacing and pavement markings to spring 2024.

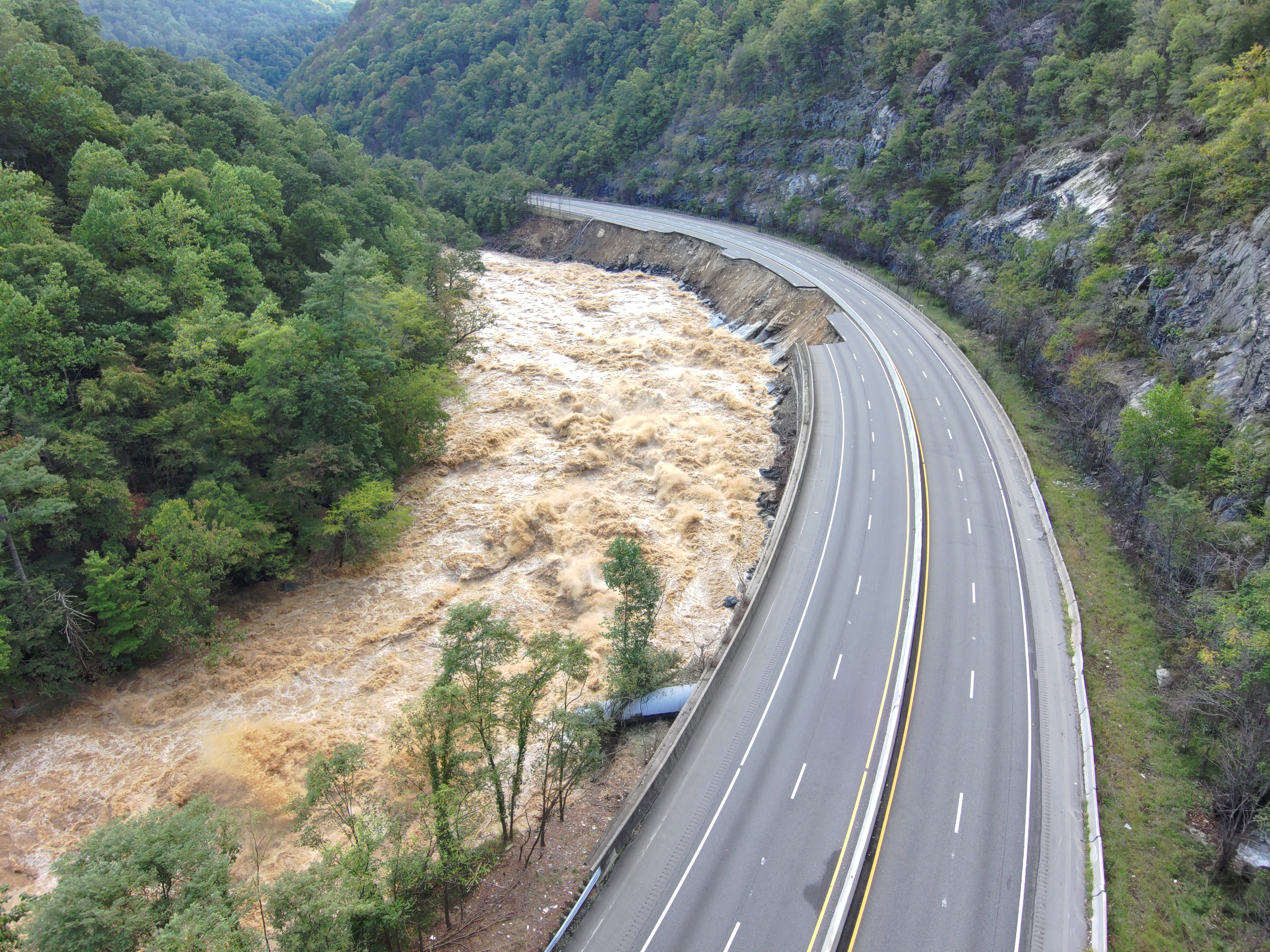
Damage to I-40 from Hurricane Helene between Clyde and Newport

Begun in late 2018 after the completion of the Fortify project to widen I-40 through South Raleigh, the section of I-40 between the I-40/I-440 split (exit 301) and NC 42 (exit 312) is being widened. As part of the widening project, many of the overpasses along the route are being reconstructed, both to accommodate the wider road underneath and to expand capacity of the roads passing overhead. An onramp was removed at exit 306 (US 70) in November 2019 in order to accommodate the wider roadway. Traffic that normally used a free-flowing loop ramp is now routed through a left-turn traffic light to access the other onramp. Exit 312 (NC 42) is being rebuilt entirely as a diverging diamond interchange, and an additional ramp is being built at that exit to provide access to Cleveland Road. Additionally, the interchange at exit 309 for US 70 (Clayton Bypass) is being expanded to also including the future NC 540/Triangle Expressway. In December 2020, a new overhead flyover ramp between I-440 east and I-40 east was opened, replacing the older ramp to allow for the wider freeway underneath. The project was expected to be completed to exit 309 by 2023 while the I-40/NC 42 interchange rebuild expected to be completed by 2024. The new lanes between the Raleigh Beltline and the Clayton Bypass were opened to traffic in April 2023.

Damage from Hurricane Helene in 2024 washed away the eastbound lanes in the Pigeon River Gorge in several places resulting in a complete closure. While crews worked to stabilize what was left, plans were made to put all traffic on the westbound lanes by the start of 2025, but further damage has delayed this action. The road reopened March 1 with one lane in each direction and a 35 MPH speed limit. The cost of rebuilding has been estimated at $750 million to $1 billion, based on the least expensive of the plans considered. Work on the permanent replacement of the eastbound lanes, including a wall along the river, is expected to start in March and take two years to complete.

== Proposed projects ==
Part of the Asheville I-26 Connector project in Asheville involves improvements to I-40 from east of the bridge over the French Broad River to just west of the US 23/US 19/US 74A interchange. The improvements will widen the freeway, improve the interchanges with US 23/US 19/US 74A, I-240/I-26/US 74, and NC 191, and reconstruct bridges. Part of the project has started, but more funding will be needed to complete it. Further widening of the interstate west of that area to NC 215 is also planned, but not funded.

Another widening project along I-40 is in development stage, between milemarkers 259 and 279 in Orange and Durham counties. After some initial delays due to noise concerns through populated areas and two public comment meetings, the project is currently in the right-of-way acquisition phase, and construction was scheduled to begin around 2022; NCDOT, however, has suspended engineering activities for the project.

Another widening project along I-40 is also in the development stage between the I-440/US 1/US 64 interchange (exit 293) and the Lake Wheeler Road interchange (exit 297). The project, which will add one or two lanes to this portion of the Interstate, will also include a redesign of the former interchange. Construction is expected to begin in 2025 at a cost of $68.8 million.

== Exit list ==
County	Location	mi	km	Exit	Destinations	Notes
Haywood		0.0	0.0		I-40 west – Knoxville	Continuation into Tennessee
Haywood		6.7	10.8	7	Cold Springs Creek Road – Harmon Den	
Haywood		14.8	23.8	15	Fines Creek Road	
Haywood	Cove Creek	20.5	33.0	20	US 276 south – Waynesville, Maggie Valley	Northern terminus of US 276
Haywood		24.2	38.9	24	NC 209 – Lake Junaluska, Hot Springs	
Haywood		27.3	43.9	27	US 19 / US 23 / US 74 west – Clyde, Waynesville	West end of US 74 overlap
Haywood	Canton	31.2	50.2	31	NC 215 – Canton	
Haywood	Canton	33.2	53.4	33	Newfound Road – Canton	
Buncombe		37.4	60.2	37	Wiggins Road – Candler, East Canton	
Buncombe		41.9	67.4	42	Liberty Road	Future interchange; construction scheduled to begin in 2025
Buncombe	Asheville	44.3	71.3	44	US 19 / US 23 / US 74A east – West Asheville, Enka, Candler	
Buncombe	Asheville	45.9	73.9	46A	I-26 / US 74 east – Hendersonville, Spartanburg	East end of US 74 overlap; no eastbound entrance; westbound left exit
Buncombe	Asheville	45.9	73.9	46B	Future I-26 west / I-240 east – Asheville, Johnson City	No westbound exit; eastbound left exit
Buncombe	Asheville	46.7	75.2	47	NC 191 – West Asheville	To Farmers Market
Buncombe	Asheville	50.2	80.8	50	US 25 – South Asheville, Biltmore House	Signed as exits 50A (south) and 50B (north) westbound
Buncombe	Asheville	51.3	82.6	51	US 25A – Asheville	
Buncombe	Asheville	52.8	85.0	53A	US 74A east / Blue Ridge Parkway – Bat Cave	
Buncombe	Asheville	52.8	85.0	53B	I-240 / US 74A west – East Asheville	
Buncombe	Asheville	55.1	88.7	55	To US 70 – East Asheville	To VA Hospital
Buncombe		58.8	94.6	59	Patton Cove Road – Swannanoa	
Buncombe	Black Mountain	63.8	102.7	64	NC 9 – Black Mountain, Montreat	
Buncombe	Black Mountain	64.8	104.3	65	US 70 west – Black Mountain	West end of US 70 overlap; westbound exit and eastbound entrance
Buncombe		65.7	105.7	66	Dunsmore Avenue – Ridgecrest	
McDowell	Old Fort	71.4	114.9	72	US 70 east – Old Fort	To Mount Mitchell; East end of US 70 overlap; eastbound exit and westbound entrance
McDowell	Old Fort	72.4	116.5	73	Catawaba Avenue – Old Fort	
McDowell	Old Fort	74.8	120.4	75	Parker Padgett Road	
McDowell	Marion	81.2	130.7	81	Sugar Hill Road – Marion	
McDowell	Marion	83.4	134.2	83	Ashworth Road	
McDowell	Marion	84.6	136.2	85	US 221 – Marion, Rutherfordton	
McDowell	Marion	86.3	138.9	86	NC 226 – Marion, Shelby	
McDowell		89.8	144.5	90	Harmony Grove Road – Nebo, Lake James	
Burke		94.1	151.4	94	Dysartsville Road	
Burke		95.8	154.2	96	Kathy Road	
Burke	Glen Alpine	97.5	156.9	98	Causby Road – Glen Alpine	
Burke	Glen Alpine	99.5	160.1	100	Jamestown Road / Dixie Boulevard – Glen Alpine	
Burke	Morganton	102.9	165.6	103	US 64 – Morganton, Rutherfordton	
Burke	Morganton	104.1	167.5	104	Enola Road	
Burke	Morganton	105.1	169.1	105	NC 18 – Morganton, Shelby	
Burke		106.2	170.9	106	Bethel Road	
Burke		107.4	172.8	107	NC 114 – Drexel	
Burke	Valdese	110.7	178.2	111	Abees Grove Church Road / Milestone Avenue – Valdese	
Burke	Valdese	111.4	179.3	112	Mineral Springs Mountain Road – Valdese	
Burke	Rutherford College	112.3	180.7	113	Rutherford College Road / Malcom Boulevard – Connelly Springs, Rutherford College	
Burke	Icard	116.2	187.0	116	Old NC 10 – Icard	
Burke	Hildebran	117.9	189.7	118	Old NC 10	
Burke	Hildebran	118.8	191.2	119	Henry River Road / Center Street – Henry River, Hildebran	Signed as exits 119A (Henry River) and 119B (Hildebran) eastbound
Catawba	Long View	120.6	194.1	121	33rd Street – Long View	
Catawba	Hickory	122.8	197.6	123A	US 321 south to NC 127 – Lincolnton, Gastonia	Cloverleaf interchange with Collector/distributor roadways
Catawba	Hickory	122.8	197.6	123B	US 321 north to US 70 – Hickory, Lenoir, Boone	To Appalachian State University and Hickory Regional Airport
Catawba	Hickory	125.1	201.3	125	Lenoir Rhyne Boulevard – Hickory	To Lenoir-Rhyne University
Catawba	Hickory	126.2	203.1	126	To US 70 – Hickory, Newton	
Catawba	Conover	128.1	206.2	128	Fairgrove Church Road	To Hickory Motor Speedway
Catawba	Conover	130.2	209.5	130	Old US 70	
Catawba	Conover	131.1	211.0	131	NC 16	Permanently closed by 2008.
Catawba	Conover	131.6	211.8	132	NC 16 – Newton, Conover, Taylorsville	
Catawba	Conover	132.6	213.4	133	Rock Barn Road	
Catawba	Claremont	134.3	216.1	135	Oxford Street – Claremont	
Catawba	Catawba	138.1	222.3	138	NC 10 west (Oxford School Road) – Catawba	
Iredell		140.4	226.0	141	Sharon School Road	
Iredell		144.0	231.7	144	Old Mountain Road – West Iredell	
Iredell		145.4	234.0	146	Stamey Farm Road	
Iredell	Statesville	147.7	237.7	148	US 64 / NC 90 – West Statesville, Taylorsville	
Iredell	Statesville	149.5	240.6	150	NC 115 – Downtown Statesville, North Wilkesboro	
Iredell	Statesville	151.2	243.3	151	US 21 – East Statesville, Harmony	
Iredell	Statesville	152.0	244.6	152	I-77 – Charlotte, Wytheville	Partial Turbine interchange; I-77 exit 51
Iredell	Statesville	152.9	246.1	153	US 64 – Statesville	Permanently closed as of October 1, 2012; was an eastbound exit and westbound entrance
Iredell	Statesville	153.7	247.4	154	US 64 (Old Mocksville Road)	
Iredell		161.8	260.4	162	US 64	
Davie	Mocksville	167.8	270.0	168	US 64 – Mocksville	
Davie	Mocksville	169.5	272.8	170	US 601 – Mocksville, Yadkinville	
Davie		173.5	279.2	174	Farmington Road	
Davie		179.8	289.4	180	NC 801 – Bermuda Run, Tanglewood	Signed as exits 180A (south) and 180B (north) Westbound
Forsyth	Clemmons	182.1	293.1	182	Harper Road – Tanglewood, Bermuda Run	
Forsyth	Clemmons	183.5	295.3	184	Lewisville–Clemmons Road – Lewisville, Clemmons	
Forsyth	Winston-Salem	187.7	302.1	188	US 421 (Salem Parkway) – Downtown Winston-Salem, Yadkinville	No access from US 421 south to I-40 west; eastbound left exit
Forsyth	Winston-Salem	188.6	303.5	189	US 158 (Stratford Road)	
Forsyth	Winston-Salem	189.3	304.6	190	Hanes Mall Boulevard	Westbound exit and eastbound entrance
Forsyth	Winston-Salem	191.3	307.9	192	NC 150 (Peters Creek Parkway) – Downtown Winston-Salem	
Forsyth	Winston-Salem	192.5	309.8	193C	Silas Creek Parkway, South Main Street	Westbound exit and eastbound entrance
Forsyth	Winston-Salem	193.2	310.9	193A	I-285 south / US 52 south / NC 8 south – Lexington	
Forsyth	Winston-Salem	193.2	310.9	193B	US 52 north / NC 8 north – Mount Airy	
Forsyth	Winston-Salem	194.3	312.7	195	NC 109 / Clemmonsville Road – Thomasville	
Forsyth	Winston-Salem	195.9	315.3	196	NC 192 east – High Point	Former alignment of Interstate 74
Forsyth				198	I-74 (Winston-Salem Beltway)	Opened on September 19, 2026
Forsyth	Kernersville	200.7	323.0	201	Union Cross Road	Diverging diamond interchange
Forsyth	Kernersville	203.5	327.5	203	NC 66 / Regional Road – Kernersville, High Point	
Guilford	Colfax	206.4	332.2	206	US 421 north (Salem Parkway) – Downtown Winston-Salem, Kernersville	North end of US 421 overlap; westbound exit and eastbound entrance
Guilford	Greensboro	207.4	333.8	208	Sandy Ridge Road	
Guilford	Greensboro	209.7	337.5	210	NC 68 – High Point, Piedmont Triad International Airport	
Guilford	Greensboro	210.7	339.1	211	Gallimore Dairy Road	SP Diamond Interchange
Guilford	Greensboro	212.1	341.3	212A	I-73 / US 421 south to I-85 – Asheboro	Eastbound left exit; south end of US 421 overlap; I-85 signed eastbound
Guilford	Greensboro	212.1	341.3	212B	I-73 north / I-840 east – PTI-GSO Airport, Martinsville	
Guilford	Greensboro	213.0	342.8	213	Guilford College Road	
Guilford	Greensboro	213.8	344.1	214	US 70 (Wendover Avenue)	Signed as exits 214A (west) and 214B (east) eastbound
Guilford	Greensboro	215.3	346.5	216	Patterson Street	Eastbound exit and westbound entrance
Guilford	Greensboro	216.8	348.9	217	Gate City Boulevard, Koury Boulevard	
Guilford	Greensboro	218.2	351.2	218	US 220 south / Freeman Mill Road – Asheboro	West end of US 220 overlap; signed as exits 218A (US 220) and 218B (Freeman Mill Road)
Guilford	Greensboro	219.0	352.4	219	US 29 south – Charlotte	South end of US 29 overlap
Guilford	Greensboro	219.3	352.9	220	Randleman Road	
Guilford	Greensboro	219.9	353.9	221	South Elm-Eugene Street – Downtown Greensboro	
Guilford	Greensboro	221.0	355.7	222	Martin Luther King Jr. Drive	
Guilford	Greensboro	221.1	355.8	223	US 29 north / US 220 north – Reidsville	North end of US 29/US 220 overlap; northbound exit and southbound entrance
Guilford	Greensboro	223.3	359.4	224	Gate City Boulevard, Lee Street	To Bennett College, UNC Greensboro, A&T University and Greensboro College
Guilford	Greensboro	225.7	363.2	226	McConnell Road	
Guilford	Greensboro	226.5	364.5	227	I-85 south / I-785 north / I-840 west – Danville, Charlotte	South end of I-85 overlap
I-40 overlaps with Interstate 85 (exits 131 to 163)
Orange	Hillsborough	258.3	415.7	259	I-85 north – Durham	North end of I-85 overlap
Orange	Hillsborough	260.8	419.7	261	Old NC Highway 86 – Hillsborough	
Orange	Hillsborough	262.9	423.1	263	New Hope Church Road	
Orange	Hillsborough	265.8	427.8	266	NC 86 – Chapel Hill, Hillsborough	
Durham	Chapel Hill	269.9	434.4	270	US 15 / US 501 – Chapel Hill, Durham	
Durham	Chapel Hill	272.7	438.9	273	NC 54 – Chapel Hill, Durham	Signed as exits 273A (west) and 273B (east) westbound
Durham	Durham	274.2	441.3	274	NC 751 – Jordan Lake	
Durham	Durham	275.6	443.5	276	Fayetteville Road – Southpoint, North Carolina Central University	SP Diamond Interchange
Durham	Durham	277.8	447.1	278	NC 55 to NC 54 – Apex	
Durham	Research Triangle Park	279.1	449.2	279A	NC 885 Toll south (Triangle Expressway) – Morrisville	
Durham	Research Triangle Park	279.1	449.2	279B	I-885 north (Durham Freeway) to NC 147 – Downtown Durham	
Durham	Research Triangle Park	280.1	450.8	280	Davis Drive	
Durham	Durham	280.8	451.9	281	Miami Boulevard	
Durham	Durham	281.4	452.9	282	Page Road	
Durham	Durham	282.3	454.3	283	I-540 east / NC 540 west to NC 540 Toll / US 1 south – North Raleigh	Signed westbound as exits 283A (East I-540) and 283B (West NC 540); I-540 exit 1
Wake	Morrisville	283.5	456.2	284	Airport Boulevard – RDU International Airport	Diverging Diamond Interchange
Wake	Cary	284.7	458.2	285	Aviation Parkway – Morrisville, RDU International Airport	Signed westbound as exits 285A (south) and 285B (north)
Wake	Cary	287.0	461.9	287	Harrison Avenue – Cary	
Wake	Raleigh	288.6	464.5	289	To I-440 / US 1 north / Wade Avenue – Downtown Raleigh	To PNC Arena, Carter–Finley Stadium, State Fairgrounds, NCSU Veterinary College, and NC Museum of Art
Wake	Raleigh	290.5	467.5	290	NC 54 – Cary	
Wake	Raleigh	291.4	469.0	291	Cary Towne Boulevard – Cary	
Wake	Raleigh	292.6	470.9	293A	US 1 south / US 64 west – Cary, Asheboro	West end of US 64 overlap
Wake	Raleigh	292.6	470.9	293B	I-440 east / US 1 north – Raleigh, Wake Forest	Cloverleaf interchange with Collector/distributor roadways
Wake	Raleigh	295.0	474.8	295	Gorman Street	
Wake	Raleigh	297.1	478.1	297	Lake Wheeler Road	
Wake	Raleigh	298.0	479.6	298	US 70 / US 401 / NC 50 (S. Saunders Street) – Raleigh Downtown, Garner	Signed as exits 298A (east/south) and 298B (west/north)
Wake	Raleigh	298.8	480.9	299	Person Street, Hammond Road	
Wake	Raleigh	300.3	483.3	300	Rock Quarry Road	Signed as exits 300A (south) and 300B (north) westbound
Wake	Raleigh	301.1	484.6	301	I-87 north / I-440 west / US 64 east – Rocky Mount	East end of US 64 overlap; Eastbound exit is a left exit
Wake		303.5	488.4	303	Jones Sausage Road	Diverging diamond interchange
Wake	Garner	305.6	491.8	306	US 70 – Garner, Clayton	Signed as exits 306A (west) and 306B (east) westbound
Wake	Garner	309.6	498.3	309	I-42 east – Smithfield, Goldsboro	Western terminus of I-42
Wake	Garner	309.8	498.6	310	NC 540 Toll west (Triangle Expressway)	Eastern terminus of NC 540
Johnston		311.8	501.8	312A	NC 42 – Clayton, Fuquay-Varina	Rebuilt into Diverging diamond interchange
Johnston		312.4	502.8	312B	Cleveland Road	New interchange opened in April 2024
Johnston	McGee's Crossroads	318.6	512.7	319	NC 210 – Smithfield, Angier	
Johnston	Benson	325.4	523.7	325	NC 242 south to US 301 – Benson	
Johnston	Benson	327.8	527.5	328	I-95 – Benson, Fayetteville, Rocky Mount, Smithfield	Signed as exits 328A (south) and 328B (north); I-95 exit 81
Johnston		333.6	536.9	334	NC 96 – Meadow	
Sampson	Newton Grove	341.0	548.8	341	NC 50 / NC 55 to US 13 – Newton Grove	
Sampson	Newton Grove	343.3	552.5	343	US 701 to US 13 – Clinton, Newton Grove	to Bentonville Battlefield
Sampson		348.0	560.1	348	Suttontown Road	
Sampson		355.4	572.0	355	NC 403 – Faison	
Duplin	Warsaw	364.5	586.6	364	NC 24 west / NC 24 Bus. east to NC 50 – Warsaw, Clinton	West end of NC 24 overlap
Duplin	Warsaw	369.6	594.8	369	US 117 – Warsaw	
Duplin		372.9	600.1	373	NC 24 east / NC 903 – Magnolia, Kenansville, Beulaville	East end of NC 24 overlap
Duplin	Rose Hill	380.0	611.6	380	Charity Road – Rose Hill	
Duplin		384.1	618.1	384	NC 11 – Wallace, Greenevers	
Duplin		385.4	620.2	385	NC 41 – Wallace, Beulaville	
Pender		390.2	628.0	390	US 117 – Wallace	
Pender	Burgaw	398.5	641.3	398	NC 53 – Burgaw, Jacksonville	
Pender	Rocky Point	408.1	656.8	408	NC 210 – Rocky Point	To Moores Creek National Battlefield
New Hanover	Castle Hayne	414.5	667.1	414	Holly Shelter Road – Castle Hayne	
New Hanover	Murraysville	416.9	670.9	416	I-140 west / NC 140 – Jacksonville, Myrtle Beach, Topsail Island, New Bern	Signed as exits 416A (west) and 416B (east); I-140 exit 20
New Hanover	Wilmington	419.9	675.8	420	US 117 / NC 132 north / Gordon Road – Castle Hayne	Signed as exits 420A (Gordon Road) and 420B (US 117/NC 132) westbound
New Hanover	Wilmington	423.6	681.7	—	US 117 / NC 132 south – State Port, Carolina Beach	Continuation as US 117/NC 132
1.000 mi = 1.609 km; 1.000 km = 0.621 mi: Closed/former; Concurrency terminus; Incomplete access; Tolled; Unopened

== Related routes ==
There are five auxiliary routes and three former business routes for I-40 in the state.

I-140 is a spur route in Wilmington that bypasses US 17 and forms a partial loop in the city.

I-240 loops around downtown Asheville and the districts in the city.

I-440 serves as much of the inner loop in Raleigh.

I-540 serves as an outer loop in the Raleigh area, also bypassing the suburbs.

I-840 serves as part of the north portion of the Greensboro Urban Loop.

I-40 Bus. used a freeway grade going that went through downtown Winston-Salem and the districts surrounding downtown, while I-40, using mostly newer construction, diverted away from downtown to the south, going through more general areas of the city. In 2020, I-40 Bus. was decommissioned after the downtown stretch had gotten renovated, and The Salem Parkway was picked as the new name for the route. In 2008, I-40 Bus. was briefly designated going through southern Greensboro when I-40 was rerouted onto the southern part of the Greensboro Urban Loop, which was then recently completed, and diverted traffic away from almost the whole city. I-40 was eventually rerouted back in going through most of the city that same year after local controversy.

Interstate 40
Previous state: Tennessee	North Carolina	Next state: Terminus
