= North Hills (Raleigh) =

- Location: Raleigh, North Carolina, United States
- Coordinates: 35.8401506°N 78.6522257°W
- Opened: 1960
- Developer: Kane Realty Corporation
- Website: visitnorthhills.com

North Hills is a mixed use development located in Raleigh, North Carolina that includes stores, restaurants, entertainment, commercial offices, residential living and a continuing care retirement community. There is a large outdoor commons area which features events such as live concerts, festivals, and a farmers' market.

The development lies at the intersection of Six Forks Road and Lassiter Mill Road, just to the north of the Six Forks Road interchange on Interstate 440. Major anchors to the development include Target, the Renaissance Raleigh Hotel, and a Regal Cinemas 14-screen movie theater, as well as former anchor JCPenney, which closed in April 2020, with its site being redeveloped for a new anchor store, Restoration Hardware.

The development is built on the site of a former shopping mall, called North Hills Mall, which was the first enclosed shopping mall in between Atlanta and Washington DC.

== Site layout ==
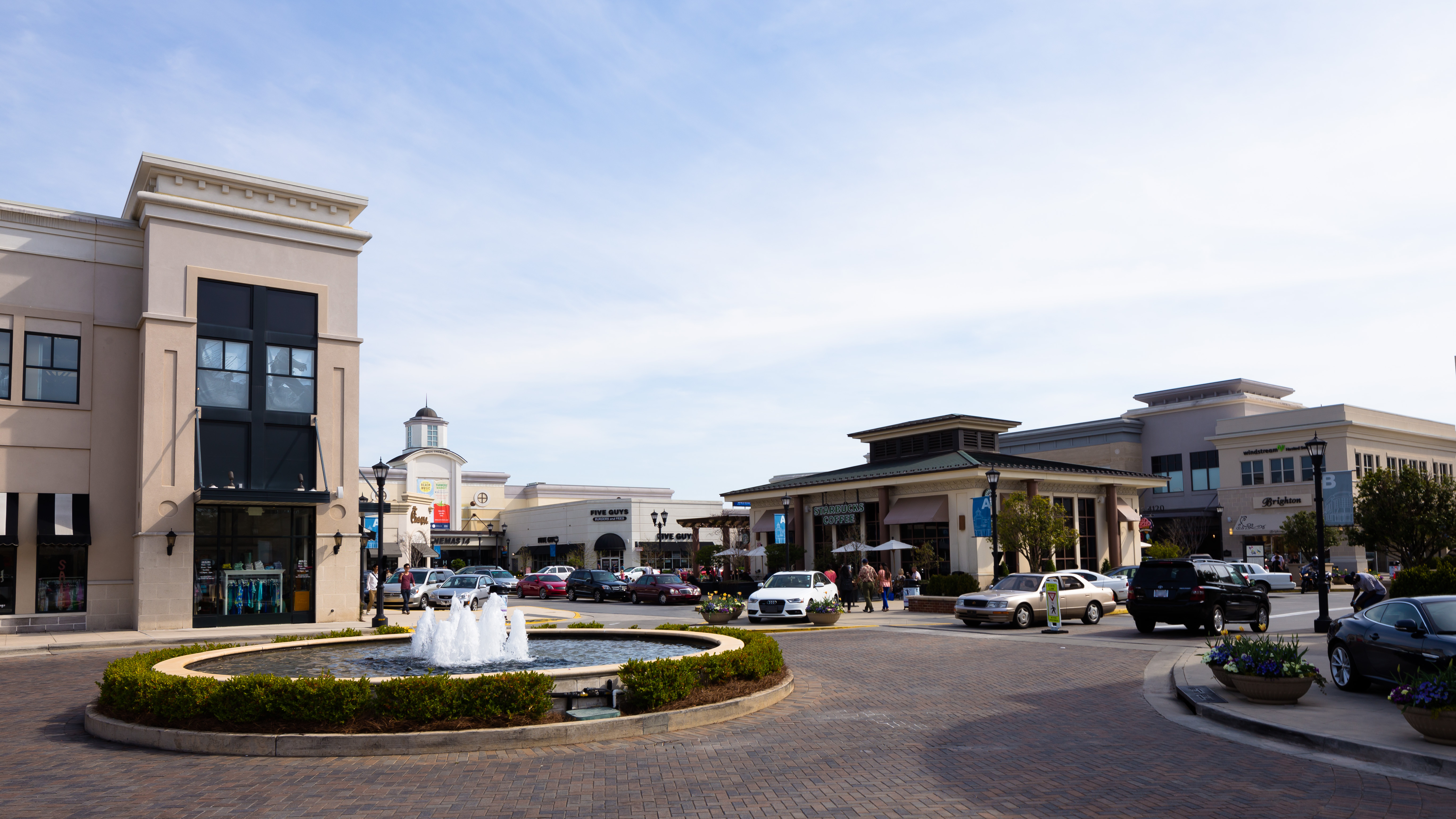
Traffic circle and several shops in Main District, North Hills

The site is divided into three districts by Six Forks Road and Lassiter Mills Road, known as Main District, Lassiter District, and Park District.

Main District, lying south of Lassiter Mills Road and west of Six Forks Road is the site of the former North Hills Shopping Mall, and was the first to be redeveloped into the mixed-use development. It features the Target, Regal Cinema, Renaissance Hotel, and the former JCPenney. It also includes a number of smaller shops and restaurants.

Lassiter District, lying north of Lassiter Mills Road and west of Six Forks Road contains a residential tower known as the Alexan, and a number of smaller shops and restaurants, the most prominent being a Total Wine shop, formerly a Harris Teeter grocery store (before their move across the street to Park District). The largest of the three districts, and also the most recently opened, is Park District, which lies east of Six Forks Road and south of Dartmouth Road.

Park District contains three large office towers, Captrust Tower, Advance Auto Parts Tower, and Bank of America Tower, as well as an AC Hotel, several residential towers, and a number of restaurants and nightlife locations, as well as smaller shops. The site is anchored by a large two-story Harris Teeter grocery store.

== History ==
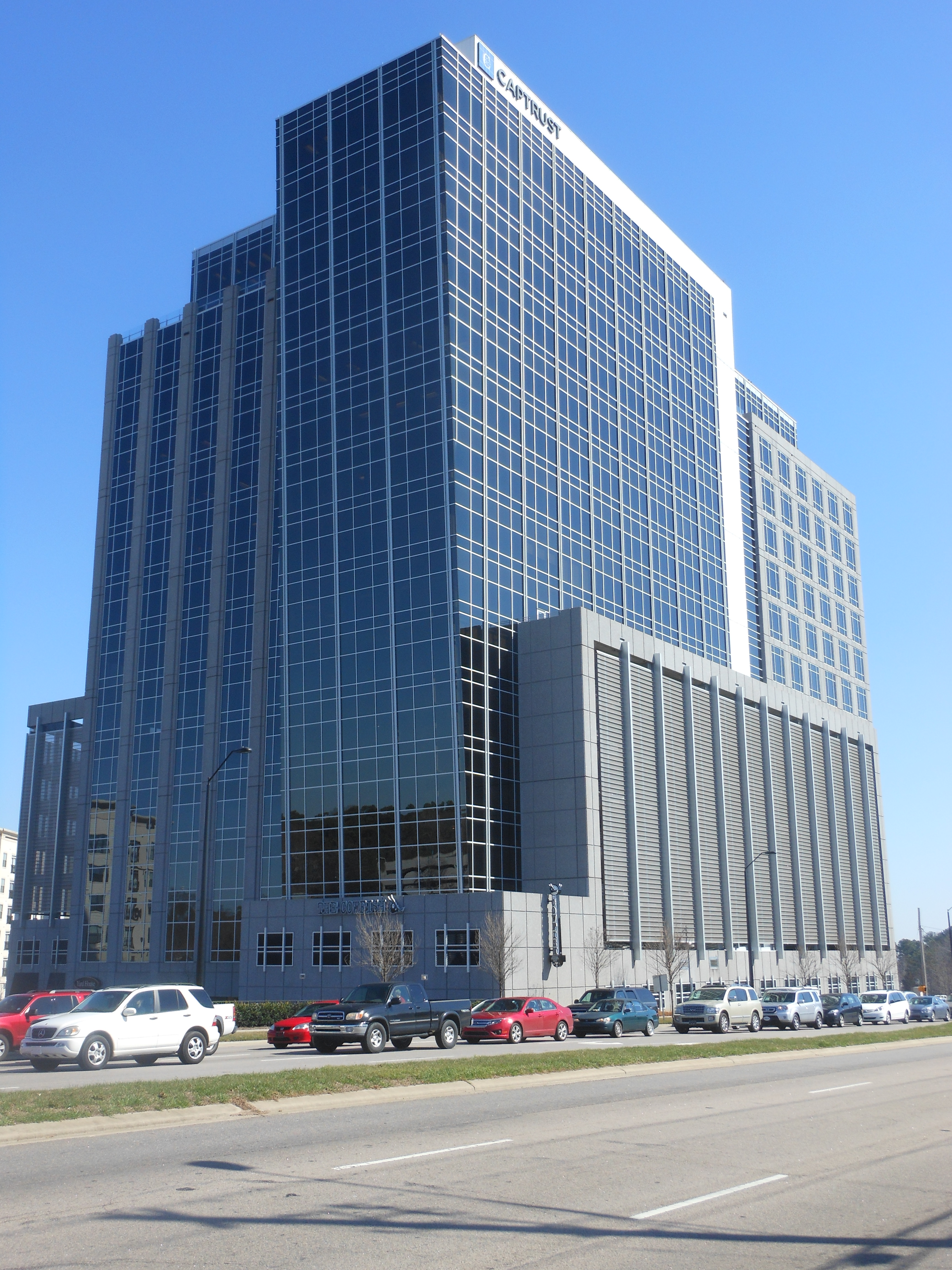
Captrust Tower, Park District, North Hills

North Hills Mall originally opened in 1960 and was converted to an enclosed mall in 1967. It was not only the first enclosed mall in Raleigh, it was also the first two-story, air-conditioned indoor mall between Washington, D.C. and Atlanta. It originally opened a few years earlier as a small strip center before being redeveloped into a mall. It had a simple rectangular design with two floors, the upper level opening onto Six Forks Road and the lower level facing a parking deck on Lassiter Mill Road. Anchors at that time were JCPenney, Ivey's, and Woolworth. At the opposite end of the mall from Penney, there was originally a large fountain, although this was torn down and the space became part of a restaurant, "Ragamuffin's", in 1979. A K&W Cafeteria was a popular destination at the south end of the mall for more than three decades.

North Hills Plaza, a strip center across Lassiter Mill Road, featured The Cardinal movie theater and a Winn-Dixie grocery store. Five years after North Hills was enclosed, the larger Crabtree Mall opened two miles away, and began to draw shoppers. In 1984, North Hills Mall underwent extensive renovations, with several new stores brought in to fill vacant spaces. In 1990, Ivey's became Dillard's. In 1999, local developer Kane Realty Corporation purchased the deteriorating North Hills Plaza, renovating it in 2001 to create an upscale shopping and dining area now called The Lassiter at North Hills. Harris Teeter was the new anchor for The Lassiter (later replaced by Total Wine), surrounded by Starbucks, Panera Bread and a variety of local shops and services.

In 2001, Kane Realty also purchased North Hills Mall from Nags Head Properties, with the intention of creating a new low-rise, pedestrian-friendly urban development that would make the area Raleigh's new midtown. At the same time, Dillard's moved to Triangle Town Center. The mall was closed in January 2003, with Kane Realty auctioning off everything from parking signs to benches and fixtures to storefronts to the public. The response to the one-day event was so great that it was extended for several additional weekends. In April, the mall was torn down shortly after, except for JCPenney and the existing parking deck, to create a mixed-use development featuring a new open air shopping center.

The new North Hills officially opened in November 2004 with a Grand Illumination of holiday lights as well as performances by members of the North Carolina Symphony, North Carolina Master Chorale and North Carolina Theatre. A new underground parking deck was added, with the lower level flanked to the south by an entrance to JCPenney and to the north by a new Target. The Target featured the first shopping cart conveyor in the Carolinas—an escalator for shopping carts so customers could more easily transport purchases to a higher level of the parking deck. A 14-screen, stadium seating movie theater located directly above Target, was originally operated by Eastern Federal but is now owned by Regal Entertainment.

JCPenney announced on January 17, 2020, that it would be closing its North Hills location, among 6 other stores. The store closed on April 24, 2020. To replace JCPenney, Kane replaced the building with a new mixed-use structure that includes a large Restoration Hardware store and a third floor with outdoor dining, as well as additional retail, office, and residential space. Construction began in June 2021. The $350 million development opened in 2024.

North Hills Innovation District will have 700,000 square feet of office space, four residential developments, and 60,000 square feet of retail. Vine North Hills was the first apartment development to open, in 2020. Channel House opened in May 2023. St. Albans Lofts, announced in 2022, is expected to be finished by 2025. Tributary, another residential development, began work in 2024. The retail development is called Makers Alley, opening in 2024. The 17-story Tower 5 with 355,000 square feet of office space opened in 2024.

The Eastern, a 36-story apartment building, opened in 2022.

In May 2025 groundbreaking took place for The Strand, a $200 million 20-story building developed by Kane and Mitsui Fudosan America.

=== 1972 shooting ===
1972 North Hills shooting
- Location: Raleigh, North Carolina, U.S.
- Date: May 29, 1972
- Weapon: Ruger 10/22
- Deaths: 5 (including the perpetrator)
- Injuries: 7
- Perpetrator: Harvey Glenn Mcleod

On Memorial Day 1972, a sniper opened fire and killed four people, while wounding seven others, in the North Hills parking lot. The shooter, 22-year-old Harvey Glenn McLeod, hid himself between cars and methodically picked off innocent shoppers before turning his .22 caliber Ruger semi-automatic rifle (that he had purchased earlier that day) on himself and committing suicide. Initially, law enforcement and the media thought the target of the attack was U.S. Senator B. Everett Jordan, who was campaigning at the mall that day. It was later determined that McLeod's rampage was an act of random violence, although Senator Jordan's press secretary was one of the victims.

== Awards ==
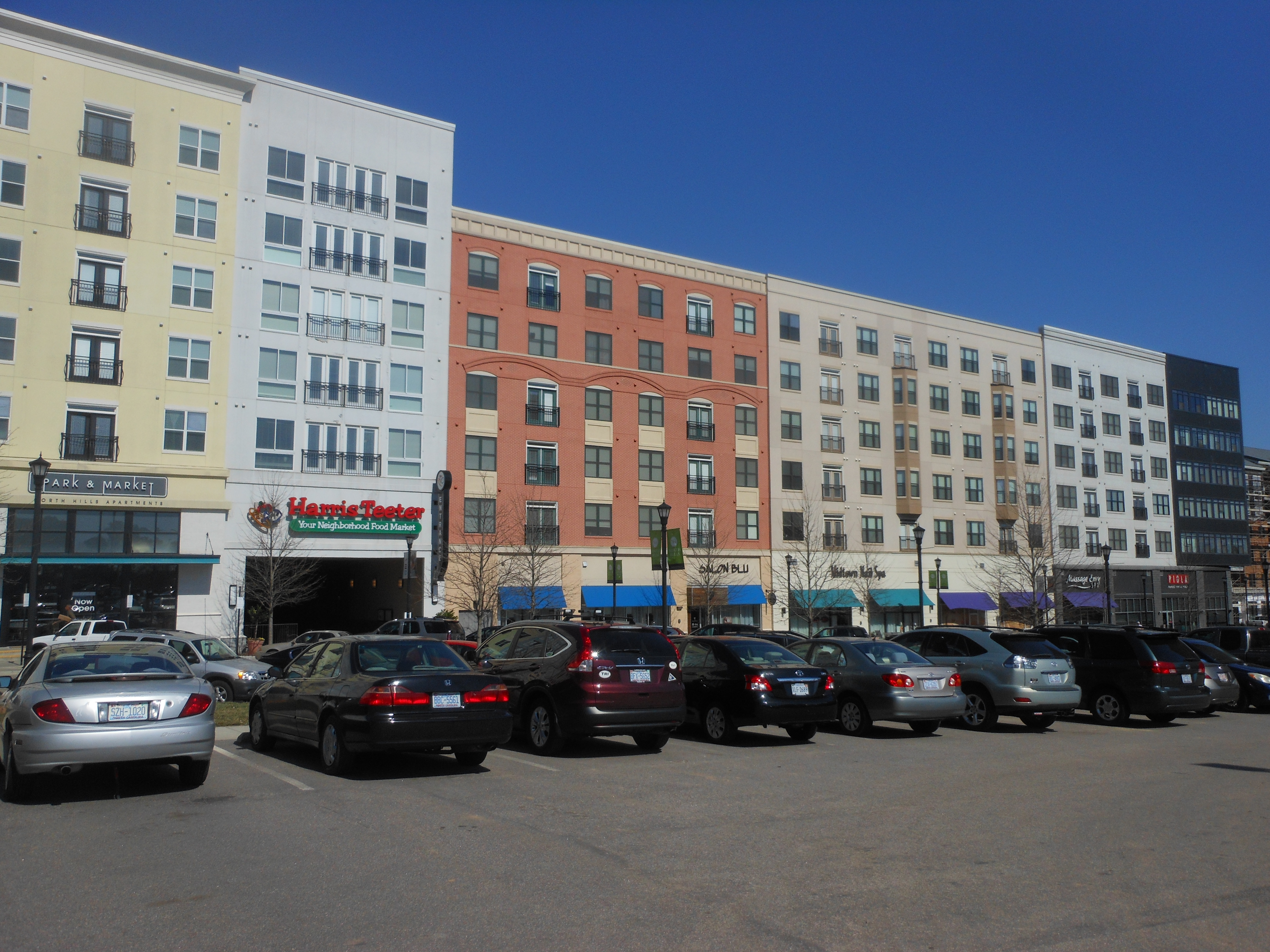
Residential buildings in Park District.

Since its redevelopment, North Hills has received much recognition, including:

- The International Council of Shopping Centers, International Design and Development 2007
- Triangle CREW, Most Creative Land Use 2007
- Triangle CREW, Best Office Development 2006
- Triangle CREW, Best Major Retail Development 2006
- Triangle CREW, Best Mixed-Use Development 2005
- Triangle CREW, Best Commercial Real Estate Service 2005
- Triangle Business Journal, Top Retail Redevelopment 2004
- Triangle CREW, Best Redevelopment 2003
- Metro magazine, Best Shopping Center 2006 and 2005
