= Centennial Biomedical Campus of North Carolina State University =

Coordinates: 35.79740°N 78.70542°W

The Centennial Biomedical Campus is 250 acres (1.0 km^{2}) of property owned and operated by North Carolina State University in Raleigh, North Carolina, United States. It is located five minutes west of the NC State's main campus and is considered part of Centennial Campus, the university's research and educational campus.

Centennial Biomedical Campus is home to NC State's College of Veterinary Medicine (CVM). Ranked 5th among the nation's 28 colleges of veterinary medicine in the current (2007) listing by U.S. News & World Report, the College of Veterinary Medicine offers graduate courses three departments — Clinical Sciences, Molecular Biomedical Sciences, and Population Health & Pathobiology. In addition, the college focuses on six specific program areas: Companion Animal Medicine, Food Supply Medicine, Biomedical Research, Ecosystem health, Equine Medicine, and Animal Welfare. CMV treats and diagnoses more than 20,000 patients each year. The college opened in 1981 with an initial enrollment of 40 students. The college now has a student enrollment of over 450.

The Centennial Biomedical Campus also houses the Veterinary Teaching Hospital, a major referral center for veterinarians from throughout the Southeast, where more than 20,000 small animals a year are treated.

In 2011, the Randall B. Terry Jr. Companion Animal Veterinary Medical Center opened. The 110,000 square-foot Terry Center is expected to be a national model for excellence in companion animal medicine. Also located on campus is the 100,000-square-foot (9,300 m^{2}) CVM Research Building, which holds the Center for Comparative Medicine and Translational Research and houses research activities in genomic sciences, gene therapy, vaccine development, creation of diagnostic tests, new cancer immuno-therapy, and genetic research to prevent inherited and acquired diseases in livestock and comparative animals.

The campus houses a Biosafety level 3 laboratory.

Future plans call for the 47,500-square-foot (4,410 m^{2}) Flexible Biosciences Lab Building (or Flex Building), which will hold “wet lab” space for corporate and institutional tenants who intend to collaborate with NC State researchers.
