= Interstate 73 =

Interstate in North Carolina

Interstate 73
- I-73 highlighted in red

Route information
- Length: 121.52 mi (195.57 km)
- Existed: 1997–present
- NHS: Entire route

Major junctions
- South end: I-74 / US 74 / US 74 Bus. near Rockingham
- US 64 / NC 49 in Asheboro; I-74 near Randleman; I-85 / US 220 / US 421 in Greensboro; I-40 / I-840 / US 421 in Greensboro
- North end: US 220 / NC 68 near Stokesdale

Location
- Country: United States
- States: North Carolina

Highway system
- Interstate Highway System; Main; Auxiliary; Suffixed; Business; Future
- North Carolina Highway System; Interstate; US; State; Scenic

Interstate 73 (I-73) is a north–south Interstate Highway, currently located entirely within the US state of North Carolina. It travels 93.5 miles (150.5 km), from northwest of Rockingham, North Carolina to northeast of Stokesdale, providing a freeway connection to Greensboro and Asheboro. A majority of the route runs concurrently with other routes.

I-73 is planned to be a much longer highway, defined by various federal laws to run from Myrtle Beach, South Carolina, to Sault Ste. Marie, Michigan; varied progress has been made in the states along its route. Associated with these plans are those for the extension of I-74 from Cincinnati to Myrtle Beach, with several highway overlaps contemplated.

== Route description ==
Lengths
	mi	km
SC		
NC	101.1	162.7
VA		
WV		
OH		
MI		
Total	101.1	162.7

=== North Carolina ===
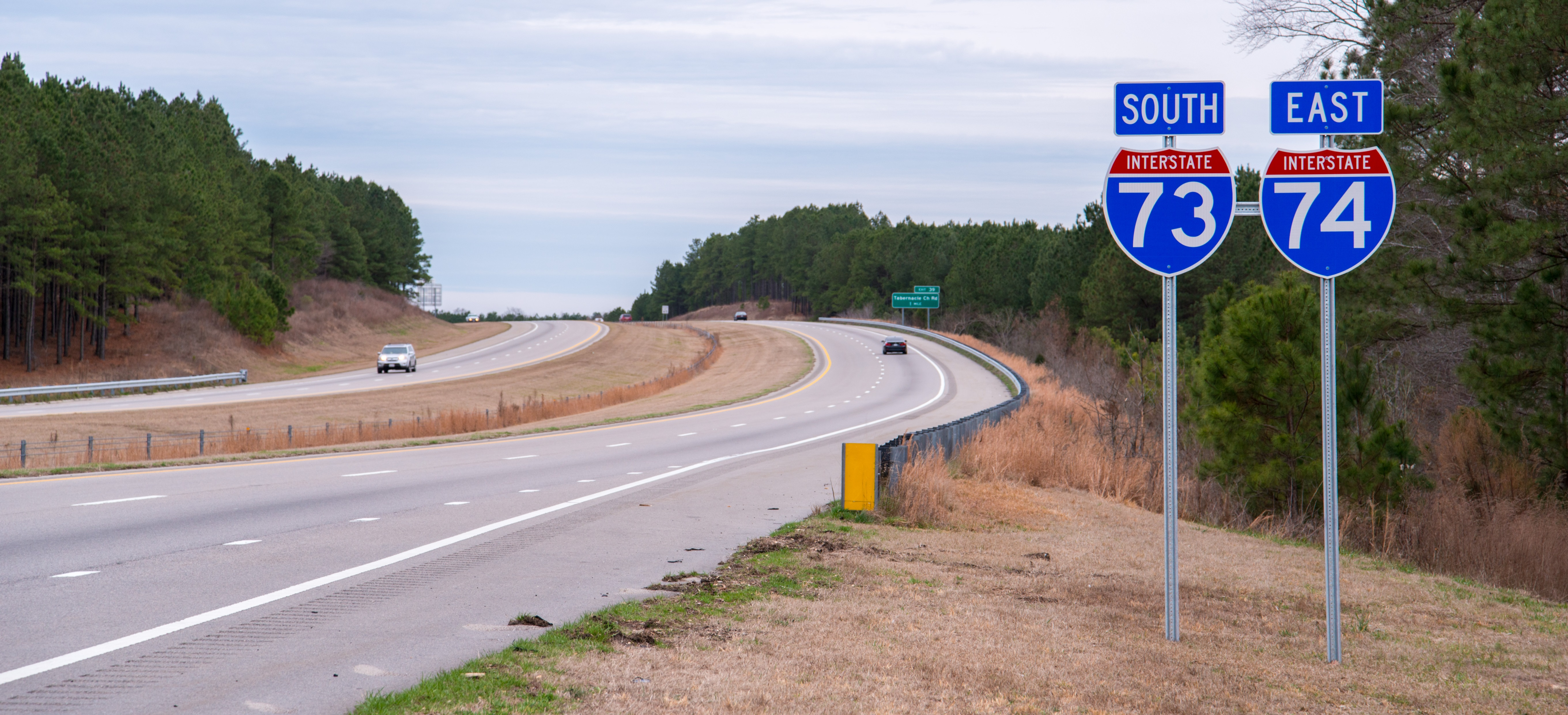
I-73/I-74 toward Ellerbe, NC in 2014

As of 2025, I-73 begins northwest of Rockingham, in a concurrency with I-74 to north of Asheboro. I-73 and I-74 travel north through northern Richmond County and into eastern Montgomery County. In Montgomery County, the Interstates pass between the county's eastern border and the Uwharrie National Forest. The freeway enters Randolph County and passes just west of Asheboro. In Randleman, I-74 splits northwest toward High Point and Winston-Salem. North of the I-74 split, I-73 passes over Randleman Lake, a reservoir formed by the blocking of the Deep River and passes into Guilford County. Entering Greensboro, it ends its concurrency with US 220 as it goes northwest along the Greensboro Urban Loop with US 421 after a brief parallel with I-85. At its connection with I-40, US 421 continues north (or geographically west) with I-40 to Winston-Salem, while I-73 continues and I-840 begins. At the Bryan Boulevard exit, I-73 separates from I-840, the latter continuing northeast along the loop. Meanwhile, I-73 turns westward, passing Piedmont Triad International Airport and continuing until it crosses NC 68. The road then resumes its northward direction, stretching eight miles (13 km) before reconverging with US 220 near the Haw River. It then proceeds four miles (6.4 km) further north along a newly widened stretch of US 220 to another interchange with NC 68 which was completed in December 2017 but not signed as I-73 until March 2018.

== History ==
In 1979, K.A. Ammar, a businessman from Bluefield, West Virginia, started the Bluefield-to-Huntington Highway Association in order to widen US 52, a very dangerous two-lane road used to transport coal from mines to barges on the Ohio River. With coal employment in decline and the desire to bring in other businesses, Ammar worked to get the road improved. In 1989, Bluefield State College Professor John Sage learned of plans to add more Interstate Highways. Ammar and Sage came up with the idea for a road that would be called I-73, to run from Detroit, Michigan, to Charleston, South Carolina. Ammar and others promoted the idea to the people of Portsmouth, Ohio, and Myrtle Beach, South Carolina.

In 1991, as Congress worked on reauthorization of the Surface Transportation Act, the people from West Virginia worked to get I-73 approved; the highway would run alongside US 52. The influential Robert Byrd, at the time West Virginia's senior senator, chaired the Senate Appropriations Committee, but even Byrd said funding for such a highway would be hard to find. In North Carolina, Marc Bush of the Greensboro Area Chamber of Commerce admitted the plan would benefit his area but said it was not a priority.

The Intermodal Surface Transportation Efficiency Act of 1991 (ISTEA) defined High Priority Corridor 5, the "I-73/74 North–South Corridor" from Charleston, South Carolina, through Winston-Salem, North Carolina, to Portsmouth, Ohio, to Cincinnati, Ohio, and Detroit, Michigan. This would provide for a single corridor from Charleston, splitting at Portsmouth, with I-74 turning west to its current east end in Cincinnati, and I-73 continuing north to Detroit.

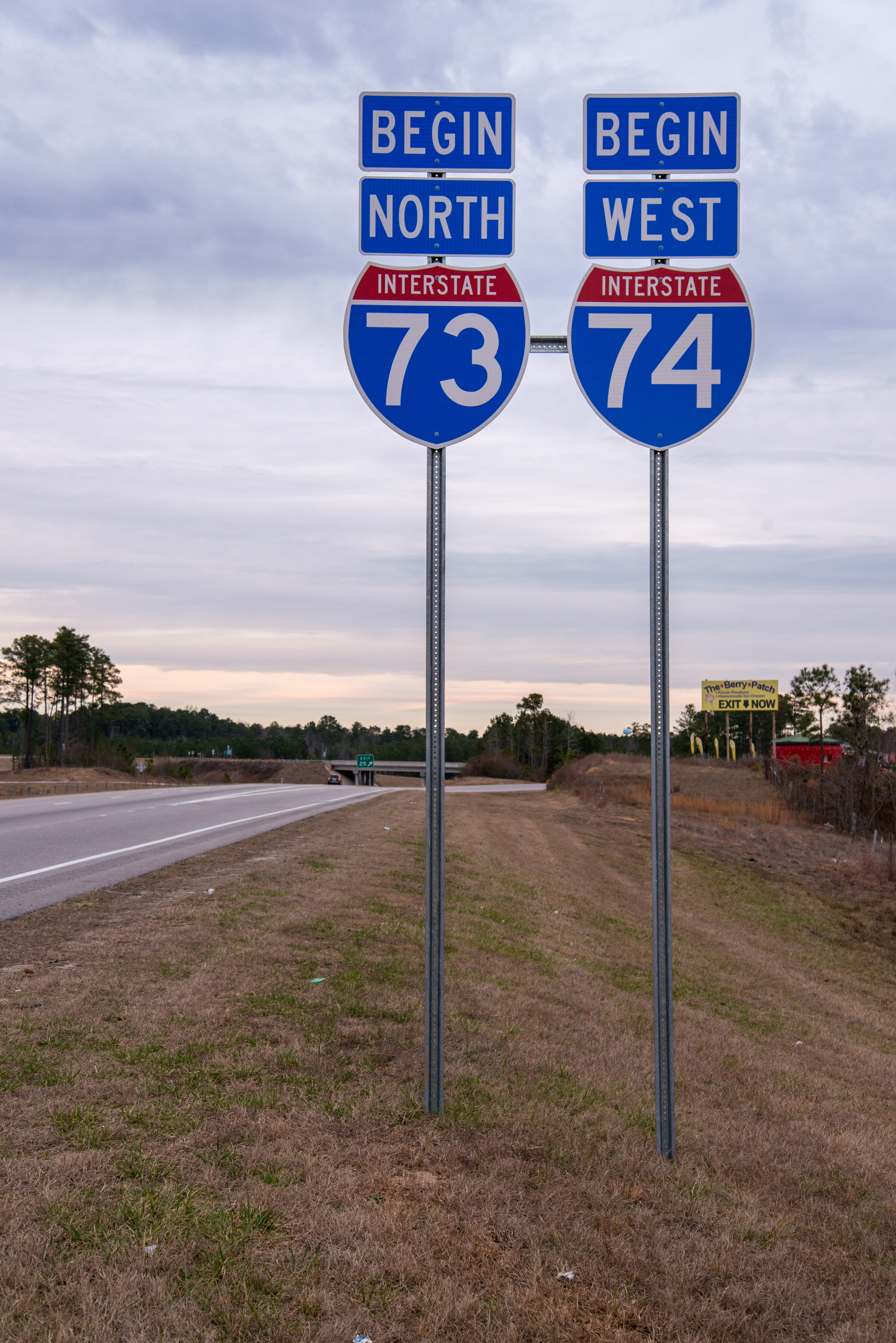
I-73/I-74 beginning near Ellerbe, North Carolina in 2014

In North Carolina, any new construction would require more money than the state had available, but Walter C. Sprouse Jr., executive director of the Randolph County Economic Development Corporation, pointed out that most of the route of I-73 included roads already scheduled for improvements that would make them good enough for interstate designation. A connector between I-77 and US 52 at Mount Airy was planned, and US 52 from Mount Airy to Winston-Salem and US 311 from Winston-Salem to High Point were four-lane divided highways. A US 311 bypass of High Point was planned, which would eventually connect to US 220 at Randleman. I-73 would follow US 220 to Rockingham. Another possibility was following I-40 from Winston-Salem to Greensboro. Congestion on US 52 in Winston-Salem was anticipated to be an issue. The route through High Point was approved in May 1993.

However, by November of that year, an organization called Job Link, made up of business leaders from northern North Carolina and southern Virginia, wanted a major highway to connect Roanoke with the Greensboro area. It could be I-73, the group said, but did not have to be. In April 1995, John Warner, who chaired the Senate subcommittee that would select the route of I-73, announced his support for the Job Link proposal. This distressed Winston-Salem officials who were counting on I-73, though Greensboro had never publicly sought the road. But an aide to US Senator Lauch Faircloth said the 1991 law authorizing I-73 required the road to go through Winston-Salem. Faircloth got around this requirement, though, by asking Warner to call the highway to Winston-Salem I-74. In May, Warner announced plans to propose legislation that made the plan for two Interstates official.

The National Highway System Designation Act of 1995 added a branch from Toledo, Ohio, to Sault Ste. Marie, Michigan, via the US 223 and US 127 corridors. (At the time, US 127 north of Lansing was part of US 27.) It also gave details for the alignments in West Virginia, Virginia, North Carolina, and South Carolina. I-73 and I-74 were to split near Bluefield, joining again between Randleman and Rockingham; both would end at Charleston. The American Association of State Highway and Transportation Officials (AASHTO) approved the sections of I-73 and I-74 south of I-81 in Virginia (with I-74 to end at I-73 near Myrtle Beach) on July 25, 1996, allowing for them to be marked once built to Interstate standards and connected to other Interstate Highways. The final major change came with the Transportation Equity Act for the 21st Century of 1998 (TEA-21), when both routes were truncated to Georgetown, South Carolina.

North Carolina took the lead in signing highways as I-73 following AASHTO's approval and since has finished and approved construction projects to build new sections of the Interstate Highway. As of 2018, the route is signed along 101.1 miles (162.7 km) of freeway from the intersection of US 220 and NC 68 north of Greensboro to three miles (4.8 km) south of Ellerbe and an additional nine miles (14 km) is complete but not signed south of Rockingham. The only other progress in building I-73 can be seen in Virginia and South Carolina. In 2005, Virginia completed an environmental impact statement (EIS) for its recommended route for I-73 from I-81 in Roanoke to the North Carolina border. The Federal Highway Administration (FHWA) approved the EIS report in April 2007. Virginia can now go ahead to draw up plans to construct the highway and proceed to build it once funds are obtained. South Carolina also has shown recent interest in building its section of I-73 with a corridor selected for the route from I-95 to Myrtle Beach in 2006 and a final decision on how the highway should be routed north of I-95 to the North Carolina border in July 2007. In January 2006, the South Carolina state legislature introduced bills to construct I-73 as a toll highway. It is hoped a guaranteed stream of revenue will allow it to build its section of I-73 within 10 years. The FHWA approved South Carolina's proposal on August 10, 2007.

On January 9, 2019, it was announced that the North Carolina Department of Transportation's (NCDOT) State Transportation Improvement Program for 2020 to 2029 included connecting I-73 with US 74 six years sooner than planned. A $146.1-million contract was awarded for the 7.2 miles (11.6 km) of four-lane freeway with "substantial completion" by late 2023.

== Future ==
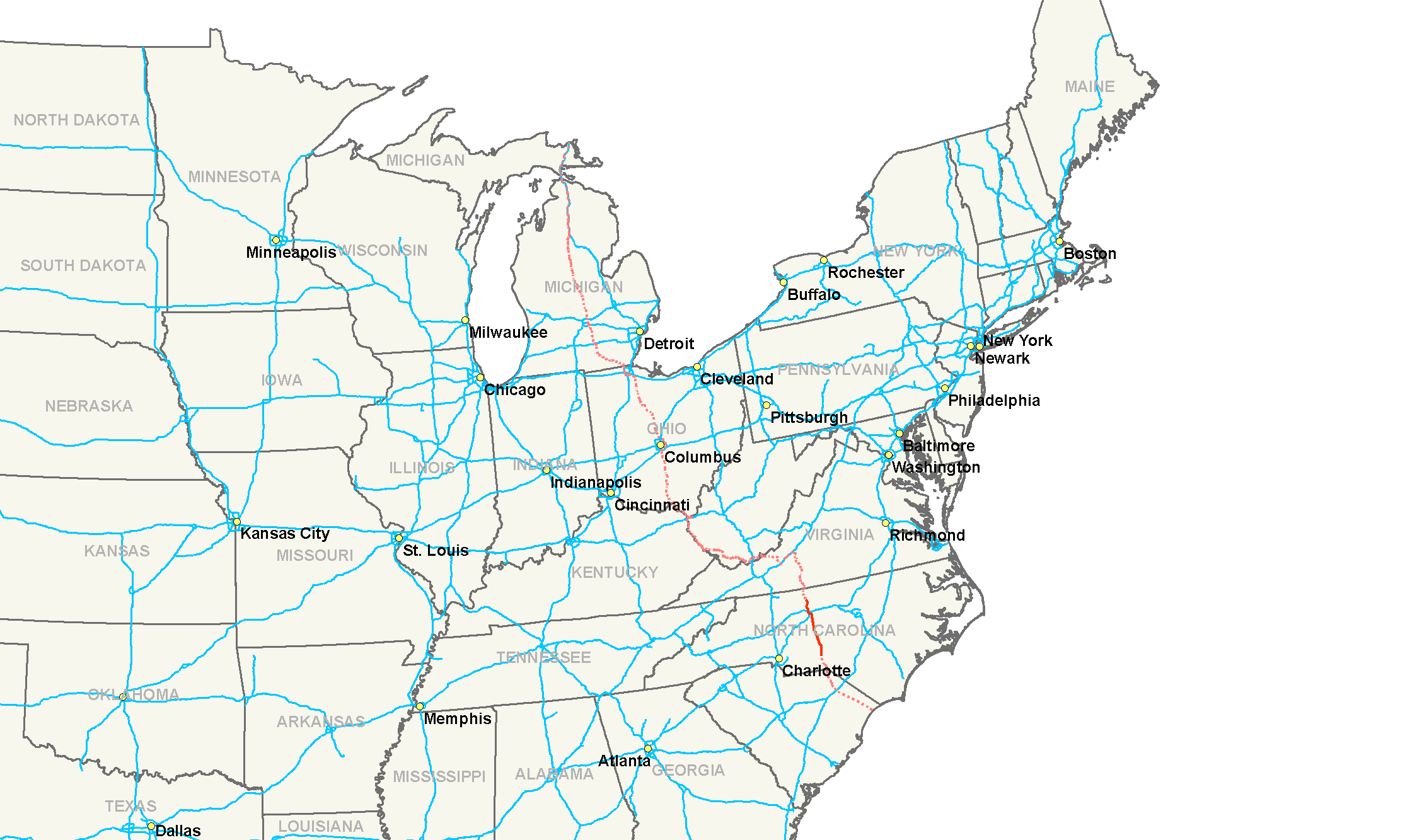
Map of the original planned full-length of I-73

=== South Carolina ===
I-73 and I-74 both will begin at Myrtle Beach. I-73 will traverse northeastern South Carolina, from the Grand Strand to Bennettsville. The current alignment will replace South Carolina Highway 22 (SC 22) and run parallel north of US 501 and SC 38. In June 2017, the US Army Corps of Engineers approved permits required to build I-73.

Interest in I-73 was renewed in early 2021 due in part to the announcement of the American Jobs Plan.

=== Virginia ===
I-73 was planned to connect Martinsville and Roanoke, then head west to Blacksburg before entering West Virginia.

Except for a divergence around the east side of Martinsville, the planned routing was to parallel US 220 to I-581 in Roanoke, which I-73 was then to follow to I-81. Signs that say "Future I-73 Corridor" can be found along I-581. From Roanoke, I-73 was to run concurrently with I-81 to near Christiansburg and then use a completed Virginia Smart Road to Blacksburg. The rest of the way to West Virginia was to be an upgrade of US 460, Corridor Q of the Appalachian Development Highway System.

The Virginia Department of Transportation (VDOT) ran studies on this corridor, but its construction had very low priority compared to other projects in the state. Additionally, funding for the route was used for other more urgent projects.

In a July 2024 presentation to the Commonwealth Transportation Board, which has ultimate authority over all transportation projects in the state, VDOT recommended the board rescind its original 2001 approval of I-73's routing. VDOT stated that the project's earmarked federal funding has been repurposed, and additional funding had not materialized and was unlikely to be found; in addition, the board itself had since adopted a policy requiring review of all location decisions after three years. At its September 2024 meeting, the board voted to rescind its approval. Any construction of I-73 would be required to start the entire location-study, environmental impact and public-comment process again.

=== West Virginia ===
Future I-73 is planned to enter, from Virginia, near Bluefield and then go northwesterly along the future route of West Virginia Route 108; formerly known as the King Coal Highway to Huntington.

I-73 will continue next to US 460 (Corridor Q) from the Virginia state line west to Bluefield. There it will join with I-74, which splits from I-77 just across the border from Virginia. For the rest of its path through West Virginia from Bluefield to Huntington and Ohio, I-73 will follow US 52 and also have bypasses near it. U.S. 52 is currently being upgraded to a four-lane divided highway; and also some new construction known as the King Coal Highway also now known as West Virginia Route 108 to Williamson and the Tolsia Highway the rest of the way to Huntington. This section has been sporadically marked as the Future I-73/I-74 Corridor with signs but is not being built to Interstate standards due to a lack of funding.

=== Ohio ===
Both I-73 and I-74 are planned to enter Ohio from Huntington, West Virginia and parallel US 52 to Portsmouth. A four-lane controlled highway known as the Portsmouth Bypass was constructed between 2015 and 2019, and runs from US 52 to US 23, along State Route 823 (SR 823) just north of Lucasville. I-73 and I-74 would continue north to SR 32, where I-74 would split from I-73 toward Cincinnati, and I-73 would continue north along US 23 and Corridor C of the Appalachian Development Highway System the rest of the way through Columbus to Toledo and the Michigan state line. In Columbus, I-73 would most likely follow SR 315 through Columbus. In Toledo, I-73 would likely follow I-280's alignment and likely route along I-475 before branching off with US 23 into Michigan. However, routes in the Columbus and Toledo areas have not yet been officially determined. Ohio has abandoned further study of much of the I-73 corridor, since the Ohio Department of Transportation (ODOT) already plans to eventually upgrade the US 23/US 52 corridor from Toledo to Portsmouth to a freeway. Nonetheless, the option to designate the corridor as I-73 once all upgrades are complete remains open, contingent upon what happens with the connecting route in West Virginia.

On February 5, 2009, then-Governor Ted Strickland proposed allowing tolls to be collected on newly built sections of highway. One of the proposed routes includes the Columbus–Toledo corridor, which is currently served by US 23 as an expressway largely without limited access.

In 2021, ODOT announced plans to reopen the study of the US 23 corridor between the village of Waldo and I-270. Some of the alternatives to be explored include upgrading the existing alignment or moving the corridor to US 33 to the west or I-71 to the east of its current planned alignment.

There has been a renewed push for the extension of both I-73 and I-74 in the state since 2022. The 2025 transportation budget bill, House Bill 54, includes provisions for both I-73 and the I-71 connector, including a mandated feasibility study to be completed by December 31, 2026. ODOT released a draft study on a connection between US 23 and I-71 in February 2026, a preferred route was chosen in July 2026, and the final feasibility study was released September 30, 2026.

=== Michigan ===
Future I-73 is planned to go northwesterly to Jackson then go north with US 127 to Grayling. From there, the corridor would have continued along I-75 to Sault Ste. Marie.

The original defined alignment of I-73 would have run along I-75 to Detroit. However, Congress amended that definition in 1995 to have a branch along the US 223 corridor to south of Jackson and the US 127 corridor north to I-75 near Grayling. From Grayling, it would have used I-75 to Sault Ste. Marie. Except south of Jackson, where the existing highways are two-lane roads and a section of road north of Lansing where the freeway reverts to a divided highway, this corridor is mostly a rural four-lane freeway. The Michigan Department of Transportation (MDOT) included using the US 223 corridor as one of its three options to build I-73 in 2000. The others included using the US 127 corridor all the way into Ohio with a connection to the Ohio Turnpike or using US 127 south and a new freeway connection to US 223 at Adrian. MDOT abandoned further study of I-73 after June 12, 2001, diverting remaining funding to safety improvement projects along the corridor. The department stated there was a "lack of need" for sections of the proposed freeway, and the project website was closed down in 2002. According to press reports in 2011, a group advocating on behalf of the freeway was working to revive the I-73 project in Michigan. According to an MDOT spokesperson, "to my knowledge, we're not taking that issue up again". The Lenawee County Road Commission is not interested in the freeway, and, according to the president of the Adrian Area Chamber of Commerce, "there seems to be little chance of having an I-73 link between Toledo and Jackson built in the foreseeable future."

== See also ==
Browse numbered routes
← SR 72	OH	→ SR 73
