= Bryan Boulevard =

Road in Greensboro, North Carolina, United States

- Bryan Boulevard highlighted in red

Route information
- Length: 5.1 mi (8.2 km)

Major junctions
- West end: I-73 / I-840 (Greensboro Urban Loop) near PTI Airport
- East end: Benjamin Parkway in Greensboro

Location
- Country: United States
- State: North Carolina
- Counties: Guilford

Highway system
- North Carolina Highway System; Interstate; US; State; Scenic

Joseph M. Bryan Boulevard (often signed as just Bryan Blvd) is a controlled-access corridor connecting Interstate 73 and Interstate 840 with Benjamin Parkway in Greensboro, North Carolina. The road formerly extended westward along Interstate 73 and Cornerstone Drive to connect with North Carolina Highway 68. It also used to serve as the main entrance for Piedmont Triad International Airport until I-73 was designated and was once named "Airport Parkway." Bryan Boulevard is designated Secondary Road 2085.

This is one of five freeways/expressways in Greensboro to use the "Boulevard" designation; the Greensboro Urban Loop is sometimes known as Painter Boulevard, O'Henry Boulevard carries a stretch of US 29 east of downtown, I-40 (formerly Business I-40) is routed along Fordham Boulevard, Business I-85 is also signed as Preddy Boulevard, and one section of West Gate City Boulevard has an expressway grade. Bryan Boulevard is the only one to be called by name rather than by number by locals.

== History ==
Bryan Boulevard was named after Greensboro resident Joseph McKinley Bryan, an insurance executive and broadcasting pioneer. Bryan sat on executive boards of many different insurance companies like the Greensboro-based Jefferson-Pilot Corporation (now Lincoln National Corporation). In 1934, he became president of WBIG, which was Greensboro's only radio station at the time. Later on, Bryan's company founded WBTV, the first television station in the Carolinas. A stretch that became a part of Bryan Boulevard, was an expressway named Airport Parkway, which connected between NC 68, which has its new stretch opening in 1982, to the airport campus. In 1990, Bryan Boulevard was official opened between an at-grade junction with Benjamin Parkway to an interchange with Westridge Road in January 1990. This was a four-lane freeway that was very similar to other projects nearby at the time, such as the Silas Creek Parkway extension project between Wake Forest Road to North Point Boulevard in Northwestern Winston-Salem. Around 1993, the expressway was extended from Westridge Road to New Garden Road. In December 1996, the route was extended from New Garden Road all over to the Old Oak Ridge interchange. Completing all the link of Bryan Boulevard In the mid 2000s, construction started on both to make room for the airport's new FedEx hub and third runway, and on a major interchange of the Greensboro Urban Loop junction. The FedEx Project was finished in 2006, and the interchange partially opened a year later in December 2007. In the mid 2010s, construction started on what would become a realignment of Bryan Boulevard. This was finished in July 2017, connecting Bryan Boulevard with a new stretch of I-73. Bryan Blvd southwest of this new route was re-signed as "Cornerstone Drive" and terminates at Regional Road. A portion of the road was also removed.

== Exit list ==
The entire road is in Guilford County. No mile makers are posted and all exits are unnumbered.

Location	mi	km	Destinations	Notes
	0.00	0.00	I-73 north – PTI-GSO Airport, Martinsville I-73 south / I-840 west (Greensboro Urban Loop) to I-40 – Winston-Salem, Asheboro, Raleigh I-840 east to US 220 (Greensboro Urban Loop)	Western terminus; I-73 exit 107 and I-840 exit 3
Greensboro	0.93	1.50	Fleming Road	
Greensboro	1.73	2.78	New Garden Road – Guilford College	
Greensboro	3.38	5.44	Westridge Road	
Greensboro	4.37	7.03	Holden Road	Separate north/south exit ramps from eastbound
Greensboro	4.84	7.79	Benjamin Parkway (incomplete access)	Eastern terminus; at-grade intersection, no eastbound access to Benjamin Parkway north
1.000 mi = 1.609 km; 1.000 km = 0.621 mi: Incomplete access

== See also ==
- Greensboro Urban Loop
- Interstate 73
- North Carolina Highway System
