= Interstate 85 Business (North Carolina) =

Decommissioned highway in North Carolina

Interstate 85 Business
- I-85 Bus. highlighted in green

Route information
- Business route of I-85
- Maintained by NCDOT
- Length: 43.3 mi (69.7 km)
- Existed: 1984–2019

Major junctions
- South end: I-85 / US 29 / US 52 / US 70 in Lexington
- US 52 in Lexington; US 64 through Lexington; I-74 / US 311 in High Point; I-85 / US 29 / US 70 near Greensboro; I-73 / I-85 / US 421 in Greensboro; US 220 in Greensboro; I-40 / US 220 in Greensboro; US 29 / US 70 / US 220 in Greensboro; I-785 in Greensboro
- North end: I-40 / I-85 in Greensboro

Location
- Country: United States
- State: North Carolina
- Counties: Davidson, Randolph, Guilford

Highway system
- Interstate Highway System; Main; Auxiliary; Suffixed; Business; Future; North Carolina Highway System; Interstate; US; State; Scenic

Interstate 85 Business (I-85 Bus.) in the U.S. state of North Carolina is a decommissioned 29.8-mile-long (48.0 km) business loop of Interstate 85 (I-85) which served several cities in the Piedmont Triad. At its peak, the highway, which was commonly referred to by locals as Business 85, was 43.3 miles (69.7 km) long.

== Route description ==
I-85 Bus. began at a partial wye interchange with I-85 (exit 87) in Lexington. Heading north for 4.4 miles (7.1 km), in a concurrency with US 29, US 52, and US 70, it went through another partial wye interchange (US 52 exit 87) before leaving the freeway. Changing to a semi-limited expressway, it served as a northern bypass of downtown Lexington, briefly running concurrently with US 64. After leaving the city limits, I-85 Bus. headed in a northeast direction parallel to I-85 further south. After it traveled through Thomasville, it entered the city of High Point at the Davidson–Randolph county line. Briefly in Randolph County for 1.6 miles (2.6 km), it entered Guilford County. East of downtown High Point, I-85 Bus. shared a unique three-level diamond interchange with I-74/US 311 before leaving the city limits. At the Greensboro city limit, I-85 Bus. completed its 30.7-mile (49.4 km) journey with a trumpet interchange with I-85 (exit 118).

== History ==
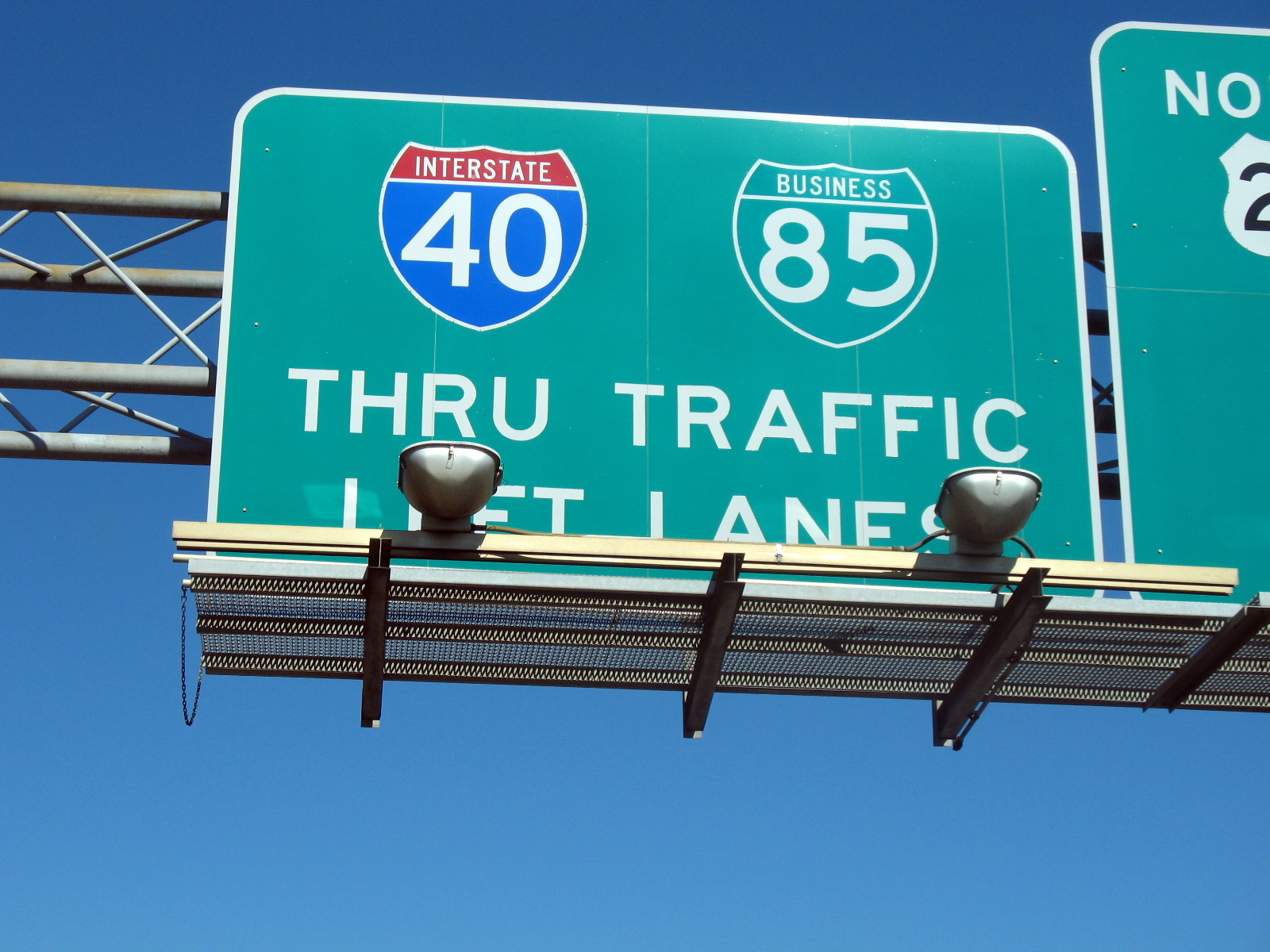
I-40/I-85 Bus overhead sign

Established in 1984 as re-designation of Temp I-85 (see below), I-85 Bus. traveled from Lexington to Greensboro, in a complete concurrency with US 29 and US 70, when I-85 was completed on a more southern parallel routing.

In May 2005, I-85 was redirected southeast around Greensboro along the Greensboro Urban Loop; its old routing through Greensboro became an extension of I-85 Bus, extending it from 29.8 miles (48.0 km) to 43 miles (69 km). The extension included a hidden two-mile (3.2 km) concurrency along I-85 (between exits 118–120A) before splitting off again with US 29 and US 70. In merging onto I-40 (exit 219), it continued easterly before meeting back with I-85 (exit 227) near McLeansville. For a brief period in 2008, I-40 was also decommissioned through Greensboro and rerouted around the Urban Loop, with its old routing replaced by I-40 Bus, but its former in-town route was eventually restored, resulting once again in a regular and business Interstate sharing the same alignment. In October 2018, I-85 Bus was reverted to its original 29.8-mile (48.0 km) alignment, ending near Jamestown. The justification was to eliminate a redundant route and decrease the number of routing shields and overhead signs through Greensboro.

=== Decommissioning ===
On October 5, 2019, the North Carolina Department of Transportation (NCDOT) submitted an application to the American Association of State Highway and Transportation Officials (AASHTO) and received approval to decommission I-85 Bus. along its entire route, as well as to reroute US 70 along Wendover Avenue westbound through Greensboro to NC 68 (Eastchester Drive) in High Point, and then onto NC 68, southbound from High Point to Thomasville. Under the state plan, all I-85 Bus. and US 70 signs were removed from the freeway stretch traveling southwesterly from I-40 in Greensboro to NC 68 in Thomasville, but the freeway would remain US 29. The state's justification was that the route changes would: provide a single continuous route as an alternative (US 70 now takes a more direct routing through Greensboro), simplify overhead signage on the freeway (eliminate confusion between the I-85 mainline and I-85 Bus.), and remove traffic from Interstate concurrencies in order to improve safety and regional connectivity.

All posted signage for I-85 Bus. was officially removed by late 2023. However, most Rand McNally road atlases continued to sign the former business route until 2026, though the rerouting of US 70 was still updated beforehand.

=== Temporary Interstate 85 ===
Temporary Interstate 85
- Location: Lexington–Greensboro, NC
- Length: 30.8 mi (49.6 km)
- Existed: 1961–1984

Temporary Interstate 85 (Temp I-85) was established by 1961 as a temporary designation that directed travelers along US 29/US 70, from the Yadkin River to Greensboro. In 1977, a flyover bridge was completed (dubbed "bridge over nothing", it later became part of I-85 exit 87), truncating Temp I-85 south-end near Lexington. This bridge was a part of the ongoing construction of the current I-85 stretch, which would be completed in 1984,giving the interstate a completed new primary routing between Lexington and Greensboro. Temp I-85 was replaced by I-85 Bus.

== Junction list ==
County	Location	mi	km	Exit	Destinations	Notes
Davidson	Lexington	0.00	0.00		I-85 south / US 29 south / US 52 south / US 70 west	Continuation beyond southern terminus; south end of US 29/US 52/US 70 overlap; I-85 exit 87; no access to I-85 north/US 29 north/US 52 north/US 70 east
Davidson	Lexington	0.6	0.97	84	NC 47 to I-85 north	Exit numbers based on US 52 mileage
Davidson	Lexington	1.5	2.4	85	Green Needles Road	Exit numbers based on US 52 mileage
Davidson	Lexington	2.8	4.5	86	Lexington, Downtown	Exit numbers based on US 52 mileage
Davidson	Lexington	3.7	6.0	—	US 52 north – Winston-Salem	North end of US 52 overlap; northbound exit and southbound entrance; US 52 exit 87
Davidson	Lexington	4.7	7.6	—	Old US 64	
Davidson	Lexington	5.2	8.4	—	US 64 west – Mocksville	South end of US 64 overlap
Davidson	Lexington			—	Smokehouse Lane	Right-in/right-out; southbound exit and entrance; exit unsigned
Davidson	Lexington	6.2	10.0	—	NC 8 (Winston Road) – Lexington, Winston-Salem	North end of freeway section
Davidson	Lexington	7.1	11.4		US 64 east – Asheboro	Interchange; north end of US 64 overlap
Davidson	Thomasville	14.3	23.0		Thomasville	Interchange northbound; former US 29 north; southbound access via Kanoy Road
Davidson	Thomasville	16.7	26.9		NC 109 (Salem Street) – Thomasville, Winston-Salem	Interchange
Davidson	Thomasville	18.4	29.6		NC 68 (National Highway) – Thomasville, West High Point	Interchange; to PTI Airport
Randolph	High Point	19.5	31.4	—	Old Thomasville Road – High Point	South end of expressway section
Guilford	High Point	20.3	32.7	—	Prospect Street	
Guilford	High Point	21.3	34.3	—	West Green Drive	
Guilford	High Point	22.1	35.6	—	Surrett Drive	
Guilford	High Point	22.8	36.7	—	Main Street – High Point	
Guilford	High Point	24.0	38.6	—	I-74 / US 311 / Brentwood Street – Winston-Salem, Asheboro	North end of expressway section; Brentwood Street had a separate exit northbound; three-level diamond interchange; I-74 exit 71B
Guilford	High Point	25.2	40.6		Baker Road	Interchange
Guilford	High Point	26.2	42.2		Kivett Drive – East High Point	Interchange
Guilford	Greensboro	28.8	46.3	—	Vickrey Chapel Road / Guilford College Road – Jamestown	South end of freeway section
Guilford	Greensboro	29.8	48.0	—	I-85 south – Charlotte, Salisbury	South end of I-85 overlap; I-85 exit 118
Guilford	Greensboro	31.0	49.9	33A	Groometown Road to Grandover Parkway	Signed as exit 119 northbound; southbound exit ramp shared with exit 33B
Guilford	Greensboro	31.8	51.2	—	I-85 north to US 421 south / I-40 east – Durham, Sanford	North end of I-85 overlap; southbound left exit and northbound left entrance; I-85 exit 120A
Guilford	Greensboro	31.8	51.2	33B	I-73 / US 421 north to I-40 west – Winston-Salem	No northbound exit; I-73 exit 97; I-85 exit 120B
Guilford	Greensboro	32.8	52.8	34	Holden Road	
Guilford	Greensboro	33.8	54.4	35A	US 220 south – Asheboro	US 220 north exits 79A-B
Guilford	Greensboro	34.0	54.7	35B	US 220 north to I-40 west – Coliseum Area	Northbound exit and southbound entrance; US 220 south exit 79
Guilford	Greensboro	34.6	55.7	35C	Rehobeth Church Road / Vandalia Road	
Guilford	Greensboro			220	Randleman Road	Northbound exit and southbound left entrance; exit numbers followed I-40
Guilford	Greensboro	35.8	57.6	—	I-40 west / US 220 south – Winston-Salem	No northbound exit; south end of I-40/US 220 overlap; I-40 exit 219
Guilford	Greensboro	36.1	58.1	220	Randleman Road	Southbound exit and northbound entrance
Guilford	Greensboro	36.7	59.1	221	South Elm-Eugene Street – Downtown Greensboro	
Guilford	Greensboro	37.8	60.8	222	Sanford	Former US 421 south
Guilford	Greensboro	37.9	61.0	223	US 29 north / US 70 east / US 220 north – Reidsville	North end of US 29/US 70/US 220 overlap; northbound exit and southbound entrance
Guilford	Greensboro	40.1	64.5	224	Gate City Boulevard / Lee Street	
Guilford	Greensboro	42.5	68.4	226	McConnell Road	
Guilford	Greensboro	43.3	69.7	227	I-85 south – High Point, Charlotte I-785 north – Danville	I-85 exit 131; I-785 exit 21
Guilford	Greensboro	43.3	69.7	132	Mt. Hope Church Road	Northbound exit only; exit number based on I-85 mileage
Guilford	Greensboro	43.3	69.7		I-40 east / I-85 north	Continuation beyond northern terminus; north end of I-40 overlap; I-85 exit 131
1.000 mi = 1.609 km; 1.000 km = 0.621 mi: Concurrency terminus; Incomplete access
