= Senator Alley =

Senator Alley may refer to:

- John B. Alley (1817–1896), Massachusetts State Senate
- Larry Alley (born 1948), Kansas State Senate
- Zeb Alley (1928–2013), North Carolina State Senate
