= Interstate 840 (North Carolina) =

Highway in North Carolina

Interstate 840
- I-840 highlighted in red

Route information
- Auxiliary route of I-40
- Maintained by NCDOT
- Length: 21.9 mi (35.2 km)
- Existed: 2011–present
- History: First segment opened in 2002 officially designated as SR 3269; officially designated as I-840 in 2011
- NHS: Entire route

Major junctions
- West end: I-40 / I-73 / US 421 in Greensboro
- I-73 near Oak Ridge; US 220 in Greensboro; I-785 / US 29 in Greensboro; US 70 in Greensboro
- East end: I-40 / I-85 / I-785 in Greensboro

Location
- Country: United States
- State: North Carolina
- Counties: Guilford

Highway system
- Interstate Highway System; Main; Auxiliary; Suffixed; Business; Future; North Carolina Highway System; Interstate; US; State; Scenic
← NC 801	→ I-885

Interstate 840 (I-840) is a 21.9-mile (35.2 km) auxiliary Interstate Highway and state highway in the U.S. state of North Carolina. It is the northern half of the Greensboro Urban Loop beltway around the city of Greensboro. It connects I-40, I-73, and US 421 in the west with I-40, I-85, and I-785 in the east, and was completed on January 23, 2023.

I-840 runs concurrently with I-73 from its western terminus to its interchange with Bryan Boulevard in the northwest and I-785 from its interchange with US 29 (North O'Henry Boulevard) in the northeast to its eastern terminus. The route provides a continuous freeway bypass around Greensboro's west, north, and east sides.

== Route description ==
I-840 begins as a divided six-lane urban freeway at an interchange with I-40, I-73, and US 421. The freeway heads north for 3.4 miles (5.5 km), concurrent with I-73, intersecting West Friendly Avenue, before reaching an interchange with Bryan Boulevard, where I-73 exits. The freeway then turns east and runs for 10.7 miles (17.2 km), intersecting US 220 (Battleground Avenue), Lawndale Drive, North Elm Street, and Yanceyville Road, before an interchange with I-785/US 29 (North O'Henry Boulevard). Here, I-785 enters the freeway, and the two highways run south for 7.8 miles (12.6 km), intersecting US 70 before terminating at an interchange with I-40 and I-85.

== History ==
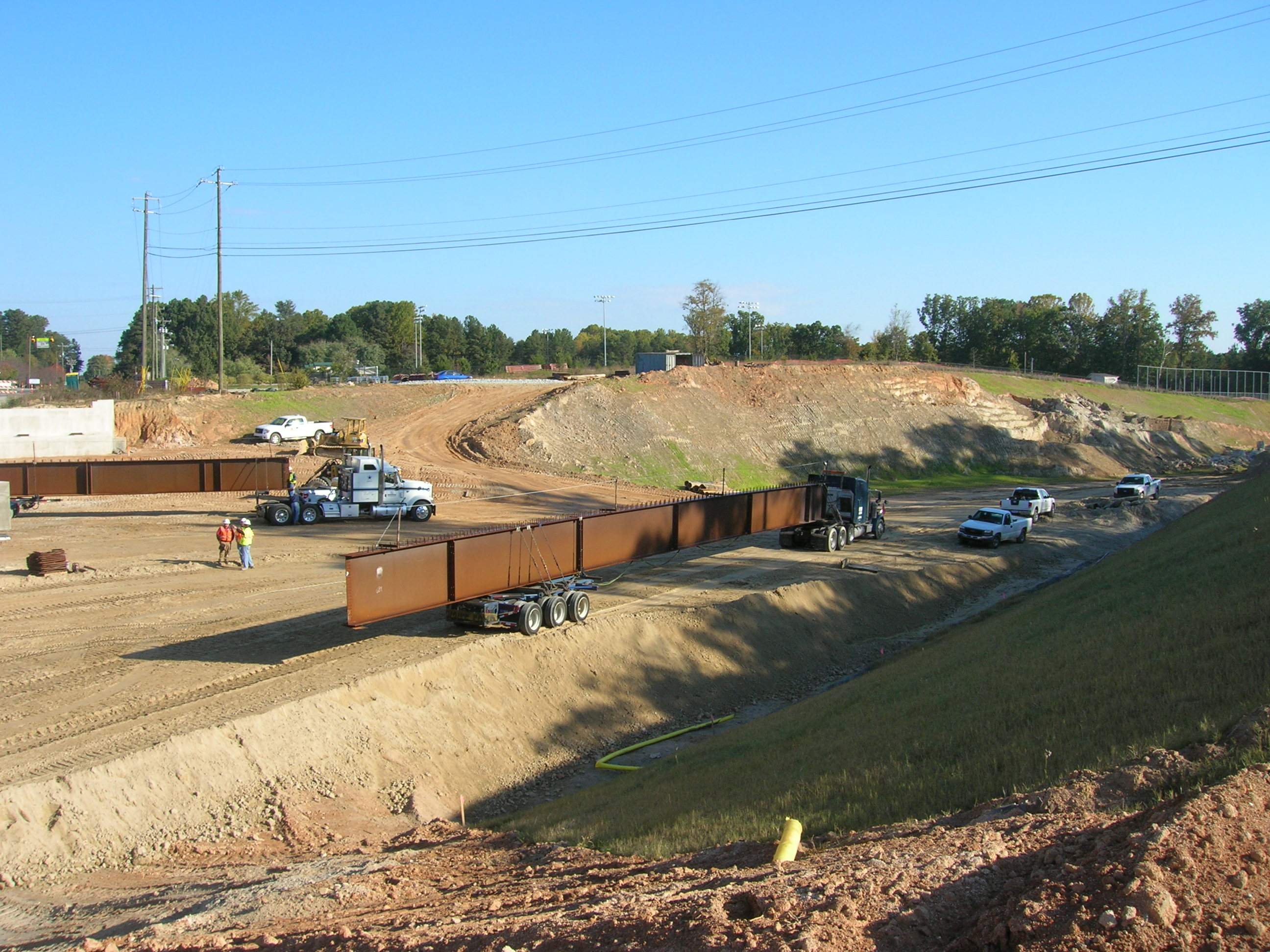
Horsepen Creek Road bridge being constructed in conjunction of the Greensboro Urban Loop

I-840 first appeared in the early 2000s as a proposed routing for the northern half of the Greensboro Urban Loop. In 2002, the first segment opened between US 70 (Burlington Road) and I-40/I-85; however, it was unsigned and designated as SR 3269; by 2006, Future I-840 signage was added at the US 70 interchange. In December 2007, a second segment opened along its routing between I-40/US 421 and Bryan Boulevard and was signed as Future I-73/I-840. In 2010, the North Carolina Department of Transportation (NCDOT) submitted its official request, to both the American Association of State Highway and Transportation Officials (AASHTO) and the Federal Highway Administration (FHWA), to designate the two existing segments of the northern half of the Greensboro Urban Loop as I-840 and the 12.0-mile (19.3 km) unbuilt portion as Future I-840. AASHTO approved the request on October 29, 2010, followed by FHWA on August 2, 2011. On September 2, 2011, NCDOT certified the route change establishing I-840.

Construction on the northern half of the Greensboro Urban Loop resumed in 2013 with the six-lane 3.4-mile (5.5 km) segment between Bryan Boulevard and Battleground Avenue (US 220), which will be signed as I-840. At a cost of $123 million (equivalent to $155 million in 2025), it was expected to be completed in early 2018. This section opened on April 19, 2018, four days ahead of schedule. In late 2014, a 4.7-mile (7.6 km) segment, between US 29 and US 70, also began construction; however, it was signed as I-785 with I-840 as a hidden designation until the completion of the Loop. This section opened in December 2017. The next section to open was between US 220 and Lawndale Drive, which began construction in October 2016 and opened to traffic on December 30, 2019.

The final section of I-840 to be constructed was the 5.7-mile (9.2 km) segment between Lawndale Drive and US 29, featuring interchanges with North Elm Street and Yanceyville Street. Construction began in May 2018. On December 23, 2020, part of the section, from Lawndale Drive to North Elm Street, was opened to traffic. In October 2022, AASHTO approved the designation of I-840 for the remaining section, from North Elm Street to North O'Henry Boulevard (US 29). This final section opened to traffic on January 23, 2023, completing the Greensboro Urban Loop.

== Future ==
Long-term plans call for an additional interchange along I-840 at an extension of East Cone Boulevard (SR 2565). Plans for the interchange have existed since 2004; however, because it is to be constructed after I-840's completion, there is no current timetable or funding for the project.

== Exit list ==
The entire route is in Greensboro, Guilford County.

mi	km	Exit	Destinations	Notes
0.0	0.0	103	I-73 south / US 421 south to I-85 – Asheboro, Durham I-40 / US 421 north – Greensboro, Winston-Salem	Southern end of I-73 concurrency; exit numbered from I-73 mileage; roadway continues as I-73 south; signed as exits 103A (I-40 east, Greensboro) and 103B (I-40 west/US 421 north, Winston-Salem)
1.6	2.6	104	West Friendly Avenue	
3.4	5.5	3A	Bryan Boulevard – Downtown	I-73 exit 107A
3.4	5.5	3B	I-73 north – PTI-GSO Airport, Martinsville	I-73 exit 107B; northern end of I-73 concurrency
6.8	10.9	6	US 220 (Battleground Avenue)	
8.4	13.5	8	Lawndale Drive	
10.4	16.7	10	North Elm Street	
11.7	18.8	11	Yanceyville Street	
14.1	22.7	14	I-785 south / US 29 – Greensboro, Danville	Northern end of I-785 concurrency; signed as exits 14A (south) and 14B (north) westbound
		16	East Cone Boulevard	Future interchange (unfunded)
17.8	28.6	17	Huffine Mill Road	
18.8	30.3	18	US 70 (Burlington Road) / To East Wendover Avenue	
21.0	33.8	21	I-40 / I-85 north / I-785 north – Greensboro, Durham, Raleigh	Southern end of I-785 concurrency
21.9	35.2	—	I-85 south – High Point, Charlotte	Continuation as I-85
1.000 mi = 1.609 km; 1.000 km = 0.621 mi: Concurrency terminus; Incomplete access; Unopened
