= Greensboro Urban Loop =

Beltway in Greensboro, North Carolina

- Urban Loop highlighted in red

Route information
- Maintained by NCDOT
- Length: 39.5 mi (63.6 km)
- Existed: 2002–present
- Component highways: I-73; I-85; I-785; I-840; US 421

Major junctions
- Beltway around Greensboro
- I-40 / US 421 in Greensboro; I-73 in Greensboro; US 220 in Greensboro; US 29 near Browns Summit; US 70 near McLeansville; I-40 / I-85 near Sedalia; US 421 near Pleasant Garden; I-73 / US 220 near Pleasant Garden; I-85 / US 29 / US 70 near Jamestown

Location
- Country: United States
- State: North Carolina
- Counties: Guilford

Highway system
- North Carolina Highway System; Interstate; US; State; Scenic

The Greensboro Urban Loop is a 39.5-mile (63.6 km) Interstate Highway beltway that surrounds Greensboro, North Carolina, United States. The Urban Loop carries I-73, I-85, I-785, I-840, and US 421. It is primarily located within Greensboro city limits, though it often crisscrosses the city line. The right-of-way of the Urban Loop and its interchanges between South Elm-Eugene Street and Huffine Mill Road was annexed by the city of Greensboro in 2005. The final segment to be built, 3.7 miles (6.0 km) between North Elm Street and I-785/US 29, opened to traffic on January 23, 2023.

== Route description ==
Beginning at an interchange between I-40, I-73, I-840, and US 421 on the west side of Greensboro, the Urban Loop follows the I-73 and I-840 concurrency 3.4 miles (5.5 km) north from this interchange. After a single-point urban interchange with West Friendly Avenue, the Urban Loop curves north-northeast before coming to an interchange with Bryan Boulevard. Here, I-73 leaves the Urban Loop to the west, and the Urban Loop continues as solely I-840, running northeast and east for 10.7 miles (17.2 km), along the northern side of Greensboro, before reaching an interchange with I-785 and US 29, where I-785 enters the loop from the northeast. Along the way, the Urban Loop intersects US 220 (Battleground Avenue), Lawndale Drive, North Elm Street, and Yanceyville Street. Turning south at an interchange with Huffine Mill Road, the Urban Loop intersects US 70 shortly after. 3.1 miles (5.0 km) later, the Urban Loop comes to an interchange with I-40, I-85, and I-85 Bus., at which point I-785 and I-840 both end and I-85 enters the Urban Loop as it heads southwest. The Urban Loop winds its way southwest as I-85, intersecting Youngs Mill Road and Alamance Church Road before joining with US 421 and turning west. After meeting South Elm-Eugene Street, the Urban Loop comes to an interchange complex with I-73/US 220 and I-85 Bus./US 29/US 70. Here, I-73 joins the Urban Loop from the south as I-85 leaves it to the southwest. The two interstates officially share a wrong-way concurrency for approximately 1 mile (1.6 km), though the collector-distributor roads of the interchanges cause the two routes to not share the same roadbed in either direction. Winding its way northwest, the Urban Loop intersects Gate City Boulevard with a diverging diamond interchange and Wendover Avenue with a partial cloverleaf interchange before reaching the initial interchange between I-40, I-73, I-840, and US 421.

== History ==
=== Early development ===
A June 1948 document from the city Planning & Zoning Commission described the Urban Loop as part of "a comprehensive thoroughfare system for Greensboro." At one time, the road was a parkway similar to Wendover Avenue and named Painter Boulevard, but the city did not have enough money to build it, and federal help would require a road like an Interstate Highway. It was named for Pennell Churchman Painter, the first city manager of Greensboro, serving from 1921 to 1929.

Painter Boulevard appeared as a freeway loop in the 1967 City of Greensboro Transportation Plan. In June 1977, a thoroughfare plan (including what would become the Urban Loop) was adopted by the City of Greensboro, Guilford County and the North Carolina Board of Transportation. In July 1989, North Carolina Highway Trust Fund Law was enacted, which provides a trust fund for designated urban loops. By November 1989, an updated thoroughfare plan was approved by the city, county and state. Planning and environmental impact studies of the Urban Loop began in 1989–1990. In 1995, a Record of Decision was made approving the Greensboro Urban Loop; finalizing its routing and approval of an I-85 bypass. By this point, the Painter Boulevard name was no longer used.

=== Initial construction ===
In 2002, the first segment of the Urban Loop opened, a 3.1-mile (5.0 km) four-lane connector, today a part of I-785/I-840, between I-40/I-85 and US 70; it was unsigned and internally designated SR 3269. By 2006, Future I-840 trailblazers were added, though from I-40/I-85 it was only signed "To US 70." On February 21, 2004, the 11.3-mile (18.2 km) southeast segment of the Urban Loop opened. On completion, I-85 was rerouted onto it, leaving its old alignment through Greensboro as I-85 Bus. The southwest section between the present day I-73/US 220 interchange and the I-73/Bryan Boulevard interchanges opened in March 2008. I-73 was signed south of I-40, though north of I-40, I-73 and I-840 were unsigned. At the time, signs for each direction simply read "To I-40" and "To Bryan Boulevard."

=== Interstate 40 relocation ===
The Urban Loop and its designations since January 2004 up to October 2008.

Upon completion of the southwest section, I-40 was rerouted onto the southern portion of the Urban Loop, sharing the route with I-73 to the west and I-85 to the east. The existing I-40 through Greensboro was redesignated I-40 Bus. On September 12, 2008, after complaints by local residents about traffic noise and motorists on the confusion between I-40 and I-40 Bus. through Greensboro, NCDOT officials received permission from the Federal Highway Administration (FHWA) to reroute I-40 back in its previous alignment inside Greensboro and decommission I-40 Bus. I-40 was left on its original route, while US 421 was rerouted onto the Urban Loop where it remains today.

=== Later construction ===
On July 31, 2013, NCDOT got approval from the FHWA to co-sign the eastern section of the Urban Loop (Future I-840) with I-785, establishing the new route in North Carolina, though I-785 would not be signed until the completion of the segment of the loop between US 29 and US 70.

The next section to go to construction was part of the northwest section between I-73/Bryan Boulevard and US 220 (Battleground Avenue) in October 2013. Next was the northeast section from US 29 to US 70 in 2014. In October 2017, ahead of the completion of the northwest section and as a new section of I-73 opened, both I-73 and I-840 were signed on the portion of the Urban Loop between I-40 and Bryan Boulevard, marking the first time I-840 was signed as a proper route.

The northeast section was completed in December 2017, signed solely as I-785, at which point the designation was also signed on the eastern section of the Urban Loop between US 70 and I-40/I-85. The northwest section opened in March 2018, extending I-840 to US 220. The next section, between US 220 and Lawndale Drive, opened on December 30, 2019. The segment between Lawndale Drive and North Elm Street opened on December 21, 2020. The final section of the Urban Loop, the 3.86-mile (6.21 km) segment between North Elm Street and US 29, featuring an interchange with Yanceyville Street, started construction in May 2018. It opened to traffic on January 23, 2023. Upon completion of this last segment, I-840 will be posted along its entire length, including the concurrency with I-785.

== Future ==
NCDOT and Greensboro DOT plans to add an additional interchange: East Cone Boulevard (SR 2565). Plans for this additional interchange have existed since 2004; however, because it is to be constructed after the Urban Loop's completion, there is no current time table or funding for this project at this time.

== Exit list ==
Exit numbers reflect mileage along the following interstates, clockwise from western side of Greensboro:

- From I-40 west of Greensboro to Bryan Boulevard: I-73 exits 103–107
- From Bryan Boulevard to I-40 east of Greensboro: I-840 exits 3–21
- From I-40 east of Greensboro to I-85/I-73 interchange south of Greensboro: I-85 exits 129–122
- From I-85/I-73 interchange south of Greensboro to I-40 west of Greensboro: I-73 exits 95–103

Sections of US 421 and I-785 also follow portions of the Urban Loop, but their mileage is not posted. Additionally, I-73 (outer lanes, miles 95–97) and I-85 (inner lanes, miles 120–122) run in parallel (but not concurrently) along a two-mile segment south of Greensboro.

Mileage below reflects miles from the interchange with I-40 west of Greensboro and continues clockwise around the Urban Loop. Other than along the segment of I-840 from Bryan Boulevard to the I-40 interchange east of Greensboro, this mileage is not posted; local mileposts reflect the mileage of the main interstate along that segment.

The entire route is in Greensboro, Guilford County.

mi	km	Exit	Destinations	Notes
0.0	0.0	103; A–B	A: I-40 east – Greensboro B: I-40 west / US 421 north – Winston-Salem I-840 begins	Western terminus of I-840 and northern terminus of US 421 overlap; left exit from inner loop
1.6	2.6	104	West Friendly Avenue	Single-point urban interchange
3.4	5.5	107; 3	A: Bryan Boulevard – Downtown B: I-73 north – PTI–GSO Airport, Martinsville	Northern terminus of I-73 overlap; inner loop exit signed as I-73 exits 107; A–B; outer loop exit signed as I-840 exits 3B-A
6.8	10.9	6	US 220 (Battleground Avenue)	Single-point urban interchange
8.4	13.5	8	Lawndale Drive	Single-point urban interchange
10.4	16.7	10	North Elm Street	
11.7	18.8	11	Yanceyville Street	
14.1	22.7	14A–B	A: US 29 south – Greensboro B: US 29 north – Danville I-785 south	Current northern terminus of I-785
		16	East Cone Boulevard	Future interchange (unknown)
17.8	28.6	17	Huffine Mill Road	
18.8	30.3	18	US 70 (Burlington Road) / To Wendover Avenue	
21.9	35.2	21	I-40 / I-85 north – Greensboro, Durham, Raleigh I-785 ends / I-840 ends	North end of I-85 overlap, south end of I-785
23.0	37.0	129	Youngs Mill Road	
25.1	40.4	128	Alamance Church Road	
27.2	43.8	126; A–B	A: US 421 south – Sanford B: Old US 421 – Greensboro	South end of US 421 overlap
29.6	47.6	124	South Elm–Eugene Street	
31.2	50.2	122; A–C	A: To Groometown Road / To Grandover Parkway B / 95: I-73 south / US 220 south – Asheboro C: US 220 north – Greensboro, Coliseum Area	Southern terminus of I-73 concurrency; signed as exit 122 from inner loop and exit 95 from outer loop; no access from US 220 southbound to inner loop nor from outer loop to US 220 northbound; exit 122A only accessible from inner loop
33.2	53.4	97; A–C	A: US 29 north / US 70 north – Greensboro B: I-85 south / US 29 south / US 70 south – High Point, Charlotte C: To Groometown Road / To Grandover Parkway	South end of I-85 overlap; exit 97 signed from southbound I-73; unnumbered from southbound I-85; exit 97C only accessible from outer loop; no access from inner loop to I-85 Bus. nor from I-85 Bus. to outer loop
35.7	57.5	100	Gate City Boulevard	Diverging diamond interchange
38.2	61.5	102	US 70 (Wendover Avenue)	
39.5	63.6	103; A–B	A: I-40 east – Greensboro B: I-40 west / US 421 north – Winston-Salem	West end of I-840 and northern end of US 421 overlap; northbound exit left
1.000 mi = 1.609 km; 1.000 km = 0.621 mi: Concurrency terminus; Unopened
