= Oak Ridge Military Academy =

Historic school building in North Carolina, United States

- ORMA

Location
- 2317 Oak Ridge Rd; Oak Ridge, North Carolina 27310; United States

Information
- Type: Military, Private, boarding, college preparatory
- Motto: Tendimus In Latium (In Excellence We Strive)
- Established: 1852
- President: Dr. Steve Wilson
- Dean: Dr. Caroline McKaughan
- Gender: Co-Educational
- Student to teacher ratio: 9:1
- Hours in school day: 7
- Campus: Suburban
- Colors: Red, White, & Blue
- Sports: basketball, baseball, cross country, flag football, soccer, swimming, softball
- Mascot: Eagle
- Nickname: Eagles
- Accreditation: SACS
- Publication: Oak Leaf
- Tuition: $19,125 (2025–26)

- Oak Ridge Military Academy Historic District
- U.S. National Register of Historic Places
- U.S. Historic district
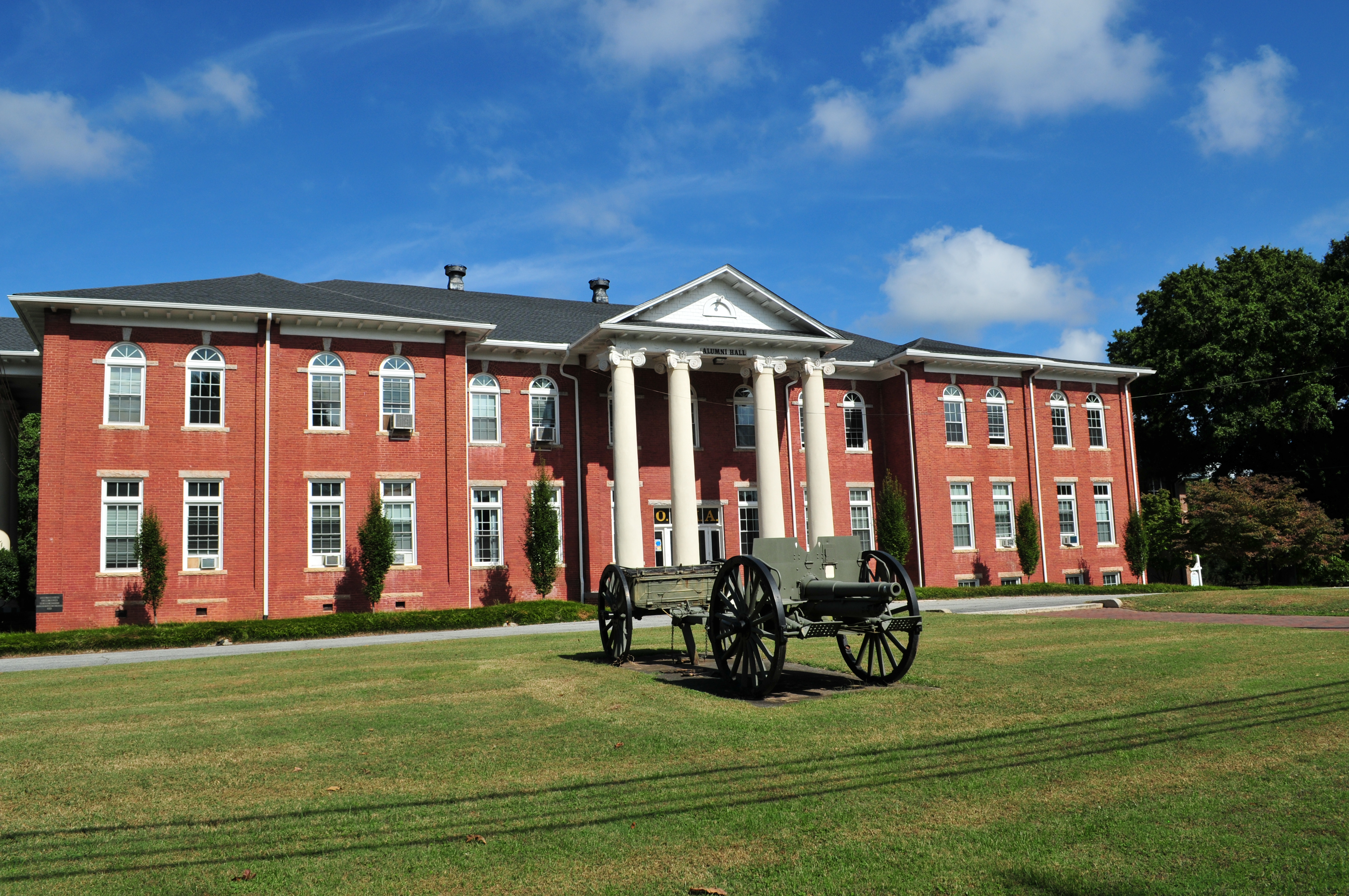
- Oak Ridge Military Academy, September 2013

- Location within North Carolina Location within the United States
- Location: NC 150 and NC 68, Oak Ridge, North Carolina
- Coordinates: 36°10′32″N 79°59′13″W
- Area: 96 acres (39 ha)
- Built: 1851
- Architect: Milburn, Frank P.; Armfield, Will G.
- Architectural style: Queen Anne, Mission/spanish Revival, Classical Revival
- Website: oakridgemilitary.com
- NRHP reference No.: 83001887
- Added to NRHP: March 17, 1983

Oak Ridge Military Academy (ORMA) is a college-preparatory military school in northwestern Guilford County, North Carolina. Oak Ridge is the oldest secondary school (middle & high school) military academy in the United States in operation and the first military boarding school to admit girls. The academy is located in the town of Oak Ridge, North Carolina, and is accredited by the Southern Association of Colleges and Schools (SACS). Oak Ridge's US Army Junior ROTC program is rated honor unit with distinction, the highest rating possible in JROTC.

Oak Ridge was created in 1852 by locals who wanted to encourage education in Guilford County. The school was closed during the Civil War for four years, reopening in 1866. From 1875 to 1914, the school was led by J. Allen Holt and Martin Holt, two professors at the academy. During that period it became one of the best in North Carolina. In 1914, leadership was transferred to Thomas E. Whittaker. The same year, a fire destroyed several buildings. In 1981, the name of the school was changed to Oak Ridge Military Academy.

The campus contains 21 buildings on nearly one-hundred acres. Oak Ridge offers extracurricular programs that focus on athletics, intramural sports, as well as drill team and other JROTC offerings. During the 2024–2025 school year, Oak Ridge had approximately one-hundred students enrolled. The academy offers 11 honors and 3 AP (Advanced Placement) courses.

== History ==
=== Founding (1852–1914) ===
Oak Ridge was established in 1852 by local families in the surrounding community, some of them associated with the Society of Friends (Quakers). The school traces its origins to April 7, 1850, when forty-three local citizens of the northwestern Guilford County community "desirous of promoting the cause of education" contributed a total of $629 for the construction of a new schoolhouse. The school, originally conceived as Oak Ridge Male Institute, changed its name to Oak Ridge Institute in 1854 prior to opening, to reflect that a limited number of females from the local community would also attend the school.

Oak Ridge Institute opened on March 3, 1853, with a classical curriculum of 18 courses and 63 students from North Carolina and Virginia. John M. Davis, an Emory College graduate, was the first principal of Oak Ridge. By 1856 it had 85 students, roughly three-quarters of whom were from places other than Oak Ridge. Through 1861, the school continued to evolve from a local community school to a regional boarding "finishing" school. The American Civil War closed the school from 1862 to 1866, all except four of the eligible-aged students (probably about 100) enlisting or conscripted into Southern units.

The night before the school was set to open in September 1865, the main schoolhouse burned down. The school reopened on August 6, 1866, but found challenges operating during Reconstruction. From 1875 to 1914 Oak Ridge was led by two brothers, Professors J. Allen Holt and Martin Holt. Under them the Oak Ridge Institute became one of the leading prep schools in North Carolina, boasting business and humanities departments, literary and debating societies, and sports teams which regularly played Wake Forest College (University), the University of North Carolina at Chapel Hill, and Trinity College (later Duke University) in football and baseball. Several of the academy's baseball players went on to play in the major leagues.

=== New leadership (1914–1981) ===
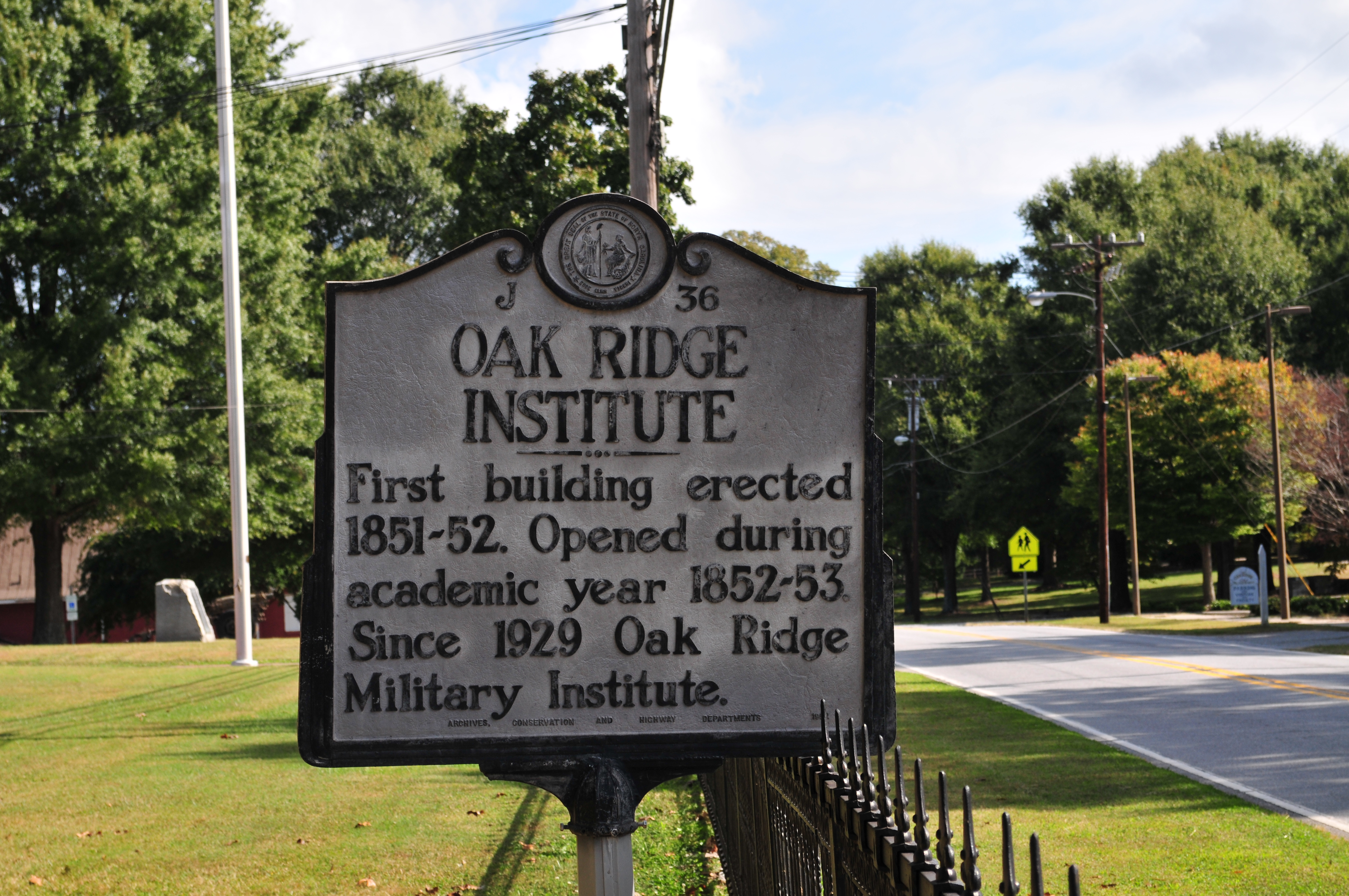
Oak Ridge Institute sign

In 1914, the leadership of the school transitioned to Professor Thomas E. Whitaker after the Holt brothers retired due to poor health. On January 14, 1914, a fire destroyed the main schoolhouse and the chapel. Oak Ridge didn't close, with private homes being converted into schoolhouses for use by the academy. Whitaker rebuilt Oak Ridge into a military academy. During the First World War, the Junior Reserve Officer Training Program (JROTC) was admitted to the campus and in 1929 Oak Ridge officially became an all-male military secondary school, changing its name to Oak Ridge Military Institute. Professor Whitaker died in 1929 and was succeeded by Colonel E. P. Holt. Colonel Holt retired in 1950 and was succeeded by Colonel T. O. Wright, who served until his retirement in 1966. From 1929 to 1967, Oak Ridge included a junior college program, in addition to the high school curriculum. During the Second World War, 127 of the academy's alumni were awarded a Purple Heart, and another 27 alumni earned the Silver Star.

In 1972, Oak Ridge became the first military high school in the United States to admit females, which prompted a name change to Oak Ridge Academy, dropping "military" from the name as JROTC participation was optional for girls. By 1981, all students, male and female, were required to participate in JROTC, and the school name was changed to Oak Ridge Military Academy. As of 2014 Oak Ridge was the oldest military high school in the United States still in operation, and the third oldest military academy.

=== Modern day (1981–present) ===
Since 1972, Oak Ridge has been a private, coeducational, college-preparatory military boarding school (with a limited day student enrollment, mostly from the local community). It is one of the eight coed military academies in the U.S. The Oak Ridge Military Academy Historic District was listed on the National Register of Historic Places in 1983. The academy is divided into a middle school (grades 7–8), and a high school (grades 9–12). Oak Ridge is the official military school of North Carolina, as designated by the state legislature in 1991. Oak Ridge is accredited by the Southern Association of Colleges and Schools (SACS), and it was first accredited by SACS in 1899. ORMA is also a member of the National Association of Independent Schools (NAIS), the North Carolina Association of Independent Schools (NCAIS), and the Association of Military Schools and Colleges of the United States (AMSCUS). It is the only active military school to have won the National High School Drill Team Championship (1996).

In the fall of 2006, the academy launched their "Campaign for Renovation and Repairs", which raised $216,000. The funds were used to get a new roof, repair buildings, add fences and columns, and build new additions to the school.

== Campus ==
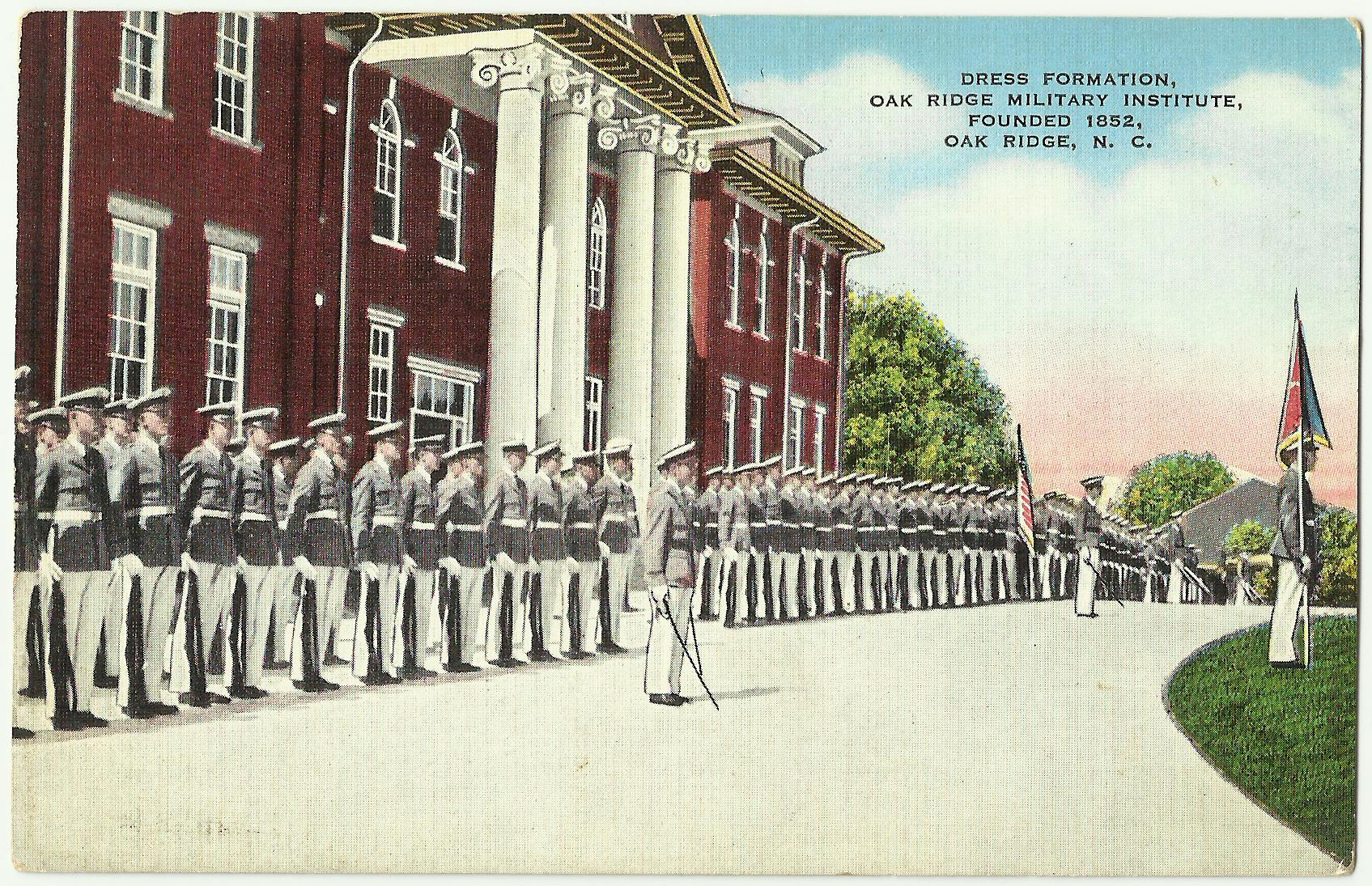
Oak Ridge Postcard featuring Alumni Hall.

The Oak Ridge Military Academy Historic District encompasses 21 contributing buildings and 1 contributing structure. They include the Queen Anne style Oakhurst (1897) designed by Frank P. Milburn (1868–1926); the home of Martin H. Holt; Maple Glade (1905); the home of J. Allen Holt; the old Donnell and Holt Store (now Cottrell Hall, c. 1900); the Alumni Building (1914); Chapel (1914); Whitaker Dormitory; Holt Dormitory; King Gymnasium (1920s); and Infirmary (1938).

The district is located within the town limits of Oak Ridge, North Carolina. It is seven miles north of the Piedmont Triad International Airport and Interstate 40, and is approximately eight miles northwest of Greensboro, North Carolina's third-largest city. Located on campus is Alumni Hall, a two-story, multi-purpose building that was designed by C. Will Armfield and built in 1914. The building has a 15-bay facade with a tetrastyle portico on its exterior. The academy also features a small Revival Style chapel on campus grounds.

== Academics ==
=== Enrollment ===
As of the 2024–2025 school year, approximately one-hundred students were enrolled at Oak Ridge. 62% of the student body is White; 16% is Black; 14% is Asian, and 8% are of other races. The academy has 12.9 teachers (FTE) and a student-to-teacher ratio of 3.9. 98 percent of the academy's students are accepted to colleges.

=== Programs ===
Oak Ridge's classes are split between four departments and a miscellaneous category. These departments are English, Math, Science and History. The academy offers 11 honors classes, and 3 AP courses.

== Extracurriculars ==
Oak Ridge hosts a "Junior Cadet Leadership Challenge" camp annually. The camp takes place over the course of five days, and includes physical activities, leadership training, and STEM training. Oak Ridge publishes a biannual magazine called the Oak Leaf. The magazine covers campus news, school events, obituaries, and alumni.

== Notable alumni ==
- Zeb Alley, lawyer, lobbyist, and politician
- Samuel Bason, politician
- Dale Earnhardt Jr., stock car racing driver, team owner, and broadcaster
- Desmond Harrison, American football offensive tackle
- Ray Hayworth, baseball player, manager and scout
- Red Hayworth, baseball player, manager, coach and scout
- Jessica Hernandez, singer
- Alvin Paul Kitchin, politician
- George Parrott, naval officer
- George Stephens, college football player
