= Samuel Bason =

American politician (1894–1986)

Member of the North Carolina Senate from the 15th district
- In office 1947–1959

Personal details
- Born: Samuel Murphey Bason; December 3, 1894 Swepsonville, North Carolina, U.S.
- Died: January 15, 1986 (aged 91) Danville, Virginia, U.S.
- Party: Democratic
- Spouse: Martha Hatchette
- Children: 1
- Relatives: Russell B. Long (son-in-law)
- Education: University of North Carolina at Chapel Hill

Samuel Murphey Bason (December 3, 1894 – January 15, 1986) was an American politician. He served as a Democratic member for the 15th district of the North Carolina Senate.

Bason was born in Swepsonville, North Carolina, the son of Flora Murphey and William Henry Bason. He attended Burlington High School, Oak Ridge Military Academy and the University of North Carolina at Chapel Hill. He served in the United States Army during World War I.

In 1947, he won the election for the 15th district of the North Carolina Senate, and served for the 15th district until 1959. He worked as a banker in Yanceyville, North Carolina and was an elder of the Yanceyville Presbyterian Church.

Bason died in January 1986 at the Roman Eagle Memorial Home in Danville, Virginia, at the age of 91. He was buried in the Yanceyville Presbyterian Church cemetery.
