= Oak Ridge, North Carolina =

- Town
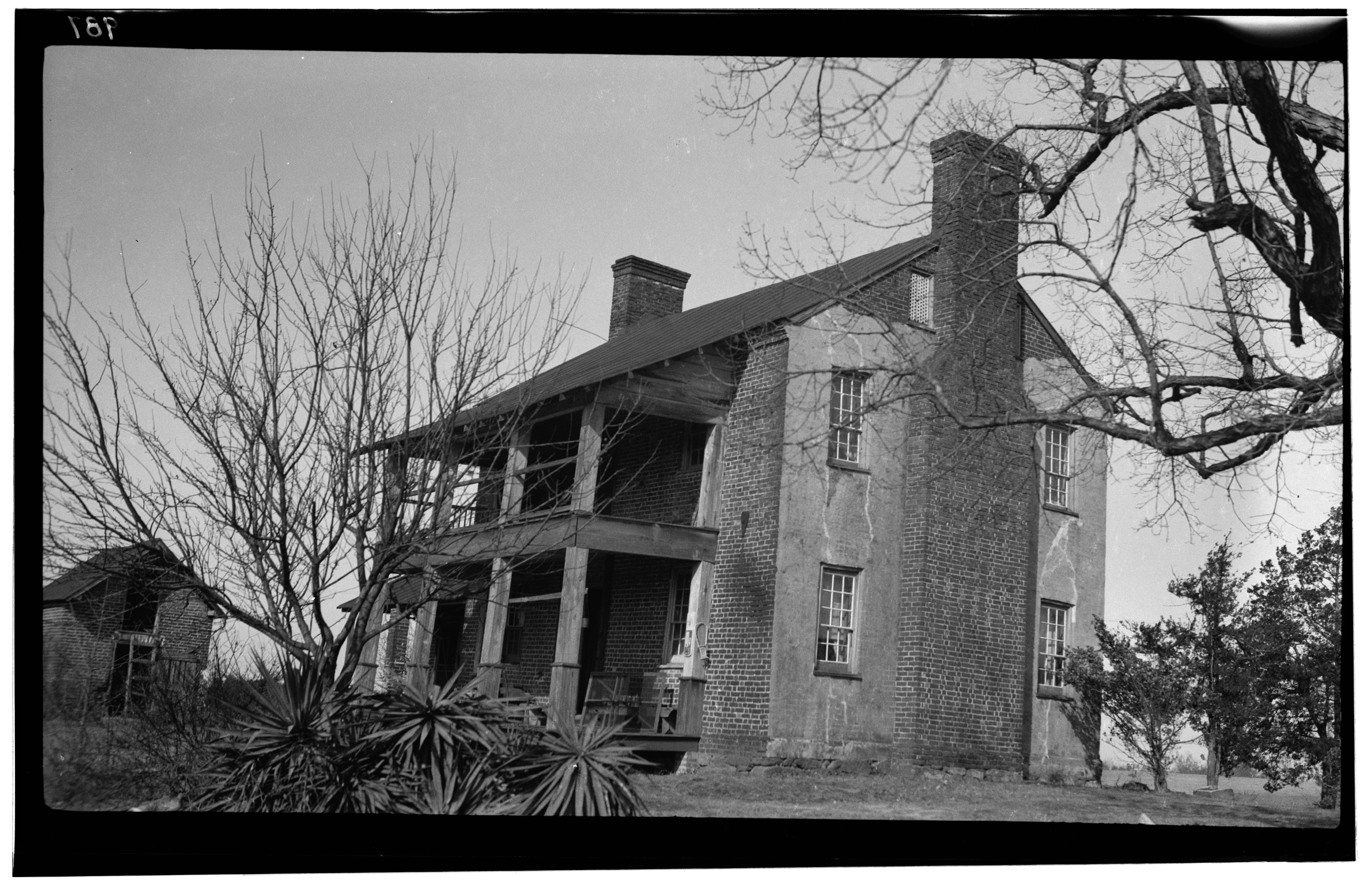
- HABS image of the Benbow House in Oak Ridge, North Carolina.

- Seal

- Location in Guilford County and the state of North Carolina
- Coordinates: 36°10′1″N 79°58′57″W
- Country: United States
- State: North Carolina
- County: Guilford
- Established: 1998

Government
  - Mayor: James Harton
  - Mayor Pro Tem: Michael Greeson
  - Council: Ann Schneider
  - Council: Mike Stone
  - Council: Lindsey Clark

Area
  - Total: 16.58 sq mi (42.95 km^{2})
  - Land: 16.44 sq mi (42.58 km^{2})
  - Water: 0.14 sq mi (0.37 km^{2})
- Elevation: 948 ft (289 m)

Population (2020)
  - Total: 7,474
  - Estimate (2019): 7,049
  - Density: 428.8/sq mi (165.56/km^{2})
- Time zone: UTC-5 (Eastern (EST))
  - Summer (DST): UTC-4 (EDT)
- ZIP codes: 27310, 27284
- Area code: 336
- FIPS code: 37-48480
- GNIS feature ID: 0991433
- Website: oakridgenc.com

Oak Ridge is a town in northwestern Guilford County, North Carolina. As of the 2020 census, Oak Ridge had a population of 7,474. Oak Ridge is 15 miles (24 km) northwest of the center of Greensboro, North Carolina's third-largest city, and it is a part of the Piedmont Triad urban area.

== History ==
The town is home to Oak Ridge Military Academy, a private, co-educational, college-preparatory military boarding school. Founded in 1852, it is the third-oldest military school in the nation still in operation, and it is the official military school of North Carolina, as designated by the state legislature.

Until the late 1990s, the Oak Ridge area was mostly rural farmland with numerous tobacco farms. However, since its incorporation as a town in 1998, Oak Ridge has seen rapid growth in its population. Many of the area's farms have been sold to developers and turned into upper-class housing developments, and several shopping centers have been built along the NC 68 corridor, especially at its intersection with Oak Ridge Road (NC 150), near the military academy.

Each Easter weekend from 1945 to 2013, the community hosted a popular horse show.

The Jesse Benbow House II, Guilford Mill, and Oak Ridge Military Academy Historic District are listed on the National Register of Historic Places.

== Geography ==
Oak Ridge is located in northwestern Guilford County. It is bordered to the north by Stokesdale, to the east by Summerfield, and to the west by Kernersville. North Carolina Highway 150 (named "Oak Ridge Road") leads east to Summerfield, and west to Kernersville. North Carolina Highway 68 is the main north–south highway through town, and leads north to US 158 in Stokesdale, and south to Interstates 73 and 40 on the west side of Greensboro; downtown Greensboro is 15 miles (24 km) southeast of Oak Ridge. Piedmont Triad International Airport is 5 miles (8 km) south of the center of Oak Ridge. NC 68 south of I-73 connects the town to High Point, while I-73 connects to central Greensboro.

According to the United States Census Bureau, the town has a total area of 15.5 square miles (40.2 km^{2}), of which 15.4 square miles (39.8 km^{2}) is land and 0.2 square miles (0.4 km^{2}), or 0.92%, is water.

== Demographics ==
Historical population
Census	Pop.	Note	%±
1900	161		—
1980	900		—
2000	3,988		—
2010	6,185		55.1%
2020	7,474		20.8%
2025 (est.)	7,896	▲	5.6%
U.S. Decennial Census

=== 2020 census ===
Oak Ridge racial composition
Race	Number	Percentage
White (non-Hispanic)	5,878	78.65%
Black or African American (non-Hispanic)	349	4.67%
Native American	16	0.21%
Asian	528	7.06%
Other/Mixed	320	4.28%
Hispanic or Latino	383	5.12%

As of the 2020 census, Oak Ridge had a population of 7,474 and 1,969 families residing in the town. The median age was 44.4 years. 26.2% of residents were under the age of 18 and 14.2% of residents were 65 years of age or older. For every 100 females there were 101.5 males, and for every 100 females age 18 and over there were 99.5 males age 18 and over.

4.3% of residents lived in urban areas, while 95.7% lived in rural areas.

There were 2,544 households in Oak Ridge, of which 43.0% had children under the age of 18 living in them. Of all households, 77.0% were married-couple households, 8.4% were households with a male householder and no spouse or partner present, and 11.7% were households with a female householder and no spouse or partner present. About 10.6% of all households were made up of individuals and 5.9% had someone living alone who was 65 years of age or older.

There were 2,637 housing units, of which 3.5% were vacant. The homeowner vacancy rate was 1.3% and the rental vacancy rate was 4.9%.

=== 2000 census ===
As of the census of 2000, there were 3,988 people, 1,382 households, and 1,173 families residing in the town. The population density was 271.9 people per square mile (105.0/km^{2}). There were 1,462 housing units at an average density of 99.7 per square mile (38.5/km^{2}). The racial makeup of the town was 93.48% White, 4.21% African American, 0.28% Native American, 0.73% Asian, 0.63% from other races, and 0.68% from two or more races. Hispanic or Latino of any race were 1.30% of the population.

There were 1,382 households, out of which 44.6% had children under the age of 18 living with them, 78.4% were married couples living together, 4.2% had a female householder with no husband present, and 15.1% were non-families. 11.5% of all households were made up of individuals, and 3.9% had someone living alone who was 65 years of age or older. The average household size was 2.89 and the average family size was 3.15.

In the town, the population was spread out, with 29.7% under the age of 18, 4.7% from 18 to 24, 31.4% from 25 to 44, 26.9% from 45 to 64, and 7.4% who were 65 years of age or older. The median age was 38 years. For every 100 females, there were 97.8 males. For every 100 females age 18 and over, there were 98.9 males.

The median income for a household in the town was $74,609, and the median income for a family was $82,070. Males had a median income of $56,250 versus $35,952 for females. The per capita income for the town was $29,346. About 2.2% of families and 3.8% of the population were below the poverty line, including 3.6% of those under age 18 and 3.8% of those age 65 or over.

== Notable people ==
- Chris Daughtry, contestant from American Idol and singer of the rock band Daughtry
- Dale Earnhardt Jr., NASCAR driver; attended local military academy prior to his racing career
- Kevin Harvick, NASCAR driver; left in 2014
- Ashnikko, singer and rapper; born here
- Dee Snider, lead singer for Twisted Sister
