= Jesse Benbow House II =

Historic house in North Carolina, United States

- U.S. National Register of Historic Places
- Location within North Carolina Location within the United States
- Location: NC 150, near Oak Ridge, North Carolina
- Coordinates: 36°9′50″N 80°00′08″W
- Area: 15.2 acres (6.2 ha)
- Built: 1858
- Architectural style: Greek Revival
- NRHP reference No.: 83001885
- Added to NRHP: September 8, 1983

The Jesse Benbow House II is a historic house located near Oak Ridge, Guilford County, North Carolina.

== Description and history ==
It was built in 1858, and is a two-story, three-bay, double-pile vernacular Greek Revival style frame dwelling. It has a low hipped roof and has a long one-story gable-roofed rear ell. Also on the property are the contributing horse barn, smokehouse, granary, woodshed or "summerhouse," greenhouse, chicken coop, and large barn.

It was listed on the National Register of Historic Places on September 8, 1983.

Rumored to be a stop on the underground railway, with a false wall and under house access in the library. All owners of the house signatures located under the main staircase, dating back to Jesse Benbow II.
