= Guilford Mill =

- U.S. National Register of Historic Places
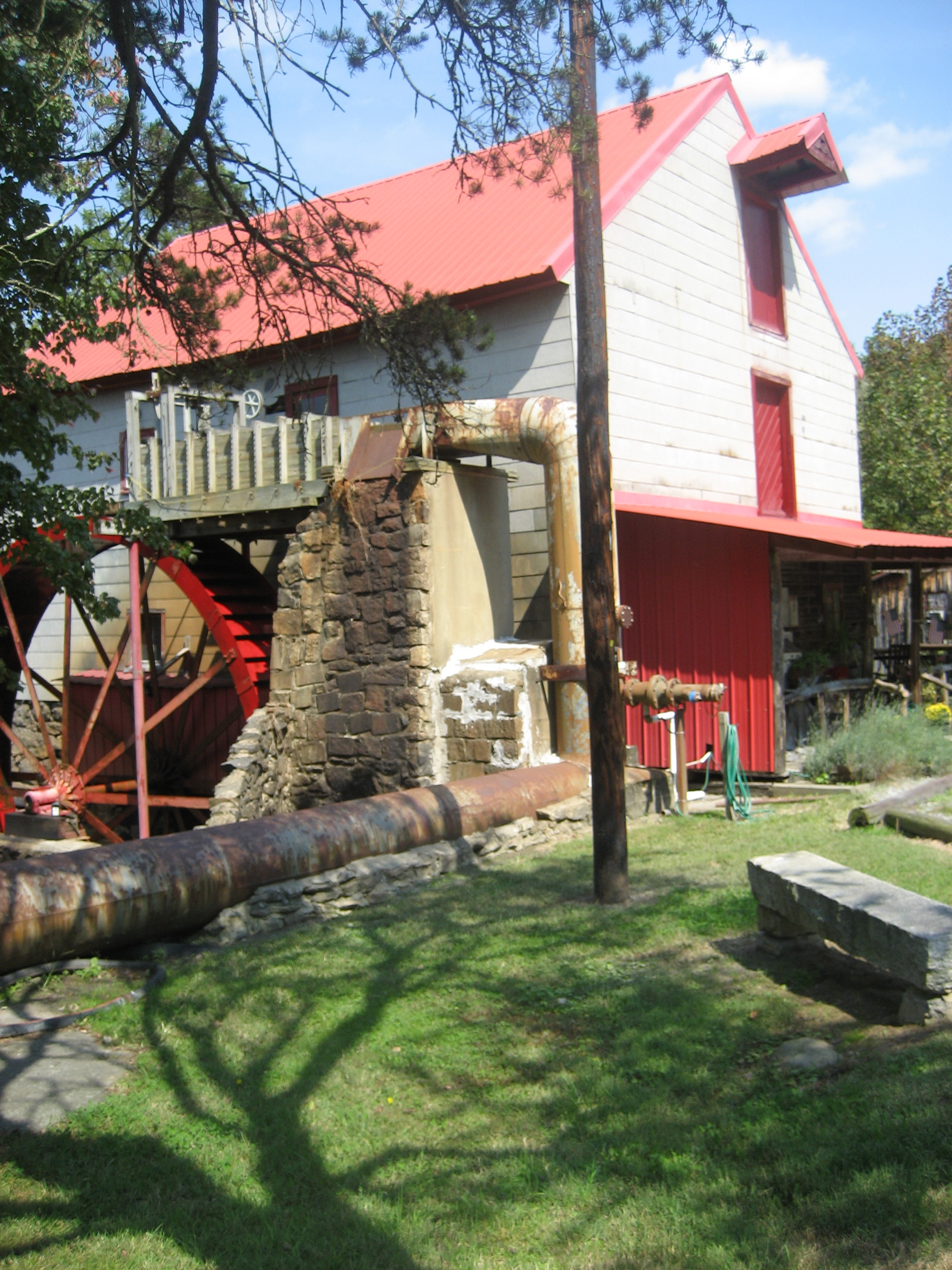
- Old Guilford Mill, September 2012

- Location within North Carolina Location within the United States
- Location: Southeast of Oak Ridge on NC 68, near Oak Ridge, North Carolina
- Coordinates: 36°9′38″N 79°58′41″W
- Area: 6.9 acres (2.8 ha)
- Built: 1822
- NRHP reference No.: 82003462
- Added to NRHP: August 2, 1982

Guilford Mill, also known as the Old Mill of Guilford and Bailes' Old Mill, is a historic grist mill located near Oak Ridge, Guilford County, North Carolina. It was built in 1822, and is a plain three-story, heavy timber frame building on a fieldstone foundation. It has a gable roof and one-story, shed roofed addition built of fieldstone. The grist mill is powered by an overshot wheel.

It was listed on the National Register of Historic Places in 1982.
