= Interstate 785 =

Highway in North Carolina

Interstate 785
- I-785 highlighted in red; Future I-785 highlighted in blue

Route information
- Auxiliary route of I-85
- Maintained by NCDOT
- Length: 6.81 mi (10.96 km)
- Existed: 2013–present
- NHS: Entire route

Major junctions
- South end: I-40 / I-85 / I-840 in Greensboro, NC
- US 70 in Greensboro
- North end: I-840 / US 29 in Greensboro

Location
- Country: United States
- States: North Carolina
- Counties: NC: Guilford

Highway system
- Interstate Highway System; Main; Auxiliary; Suffixed; Business; Future
← NC 772	NC	→ I-795

Interstate 785 (I-785) is an auxiliary Interstate Highway in the US state of North Carolina. As of 2022, it is completed through 6.81 miles (10.96 km) eastern Guilford County, through a concurrency with I-840 along the Greensboro Urban Loop. When completed, it will connect Greensboro to Danville, Virginia, a distance of about 50 miles (80 km).

== Route description ==
I-785 begins at the interchange of I-40/I-85. Heading north, it connects with US Highway 70 (US 70) before ending at its current northern terminus at US 29. The entire route is in concurrency with I-840.

Future corridor signs of I-785 are marked along US 29 between Greensboro and Danville. The next phase of this project is now funded by the North Carolina Department of Transportation (NCDOT) from its current ending point at exit 14 to US 29/US 158 exit 153 at the northernmost Reidsville city limits. While fully funded, the project is divided into schedule to begin in 2020 with two interchanges located within Guilford and Rockingham counties. In Virginia, State Route 785 (SR 785) is the unsigned interim route number until I-785 is built to Interstate standards.

== History ==
The designation was approved in 1997 at the request of a coalition of counties in North Carolina and Virginia who saw it as a way of further developing that area's economy. Most of the route will use existing US 29 north of Greensboro; however, for a few miles I-785 will run between US 29 and its parent route, I-85 on the Greensboro Urban Loop, which will also carry the I-840 designation. Construction of this highway was due to begin in 2011. With the upgrade of the Danville Expressway to a four-lane route in 2004, the I-785 route in Virginia is complete (and has been given the interim designation SR 785), but US 29 still needs to be upgraded to Interstate standards in North Carolina between the Greensboro Loop and Reidsville before the route can be signed as an Interstate. At that time, there were no projects scheduled by NCDOT to do so. Given that in the spring of 2006 NCDOT put up mileposts and added numbers to exit signs from Reidsville to the Virginia border reflecting US 29's mileage, an upgrade of this highway to an Interstate apparently was not in their immediate plans.

On July 31, 2013, NCDOT got approval from the Federal Highway Administration (FHWA) to cosign the first section of I-785 with I-840 in eastern Guilford County officially establishing I-785 in North Carolina.

The next section of I-785 opened on December 6, 2017, with hidden concurrency of I-840. With an estimated cost of $119 million (equivalent to $149 million in 2024), the 5.5-mile (8.9 km) section, completing the eastern segment of the Greensboro Urban Loop, goes from US 70 (Burlington Road) to US 29, with an interchange at Huffine Mill Road. On September 13, 2019, a Reidsville Transportation Forum was held where it was announced I-785 is now funded and committed by NCDOT from its current ending point at exit 14 to US 29/US 158 exit 153 at the northernmost Reidsville city limits. Many officials from the North Carolina General Assembly and NCDOT presented at the forum, with the Reidsville Chamber of Commerce sharing quotes from these officials afterward regarding I-785. The construction of I-785 being extended to the city of Reidsville is a reflection of the city's growth as a center of transportation and commerce in the north Greensboro metropolitan area connecting with the Reidsville US 158 corridor.

== Future ==
Following the Greensboro Urban Loop completion, NCDOT and Greensboro DOT plan to extend Cone Boulevard (SR 2565) toward the McLeansville area and add an interchange. Plans for the interchange have existed since 2004; however, no time table or funding is available at this time, as it is expected to wait until after completion of the Greensboro Urban Loop.

The state has allocated funding as of September 2019 to upgrade US 29 north of I-785 to the US 158/North Carolina Highway 14 (NC 14) junction in Reidsville to interstate standards, necessary for I-785 to be signed northward to Virginia, however construction is scheduled towards the middle of the decade, after the completion of the urban loop, and is estimated at a cost of $89 million. Roadway improvement and interchange upgrades to Summit Avenue (SR 2526) and Reedy Fork Parkway (SR 2790) in Browns Summit is planned to begin in 2020 with a scheduled completion in 2023, known as STIP Number R-4707, with an estimated cost of $44.1 million. NCDOT is currently upgrading exit signage for the current US 29 freeway stretch situated north of NC 14 in Reidsville. I-785 is now funded and committed project by NCDOT from its current ending point at exit 14 to US 29/US 158 exit 153 at the northernmost Reidsville city limits. While fully funded, the project is divided into schedule to begin in 2020 with two interchanges located within Guilford and Rockingham counties.

== Exit list ==
State	County	Location	mi	km	Exit	Destinations	Notes
North Carolina	Guilford	Greensboro	0.0	0.0	—	I-85 south – Charlotte	Continuation as I-85
North Carolina	Guilford	Greensboro	0.0	0.0	21	I-40 / I-85 north / I-840 ends – Greensboro, Durham, Raleigh	East end of I-840
North Carolina	Guilford	Greensboro	2.9	4.7	18	US 70 (Burlington Road) / To Wendover Avenue	
North Carolina	Guilford	Greensboro	3.8	6.1	17	Huffine Mill Road	
North Carolina	Guilford	Greensboro			16	Cone Boulevard	Future interchange (unfunded)
North Carolina	Guilford	Greensboro	7.1	11.4	14	I-840 west / US 29 – Greensboro, Danville	West end of I-840; current northern terminus of I-785
North Carolina	Guilford				136	Hicone Road	Existing interchange of US 29; rebuilt to interstate standards
North Carolina	Guilford	Browns Summit			137	Reedy Fork Parkway	Existing interchange of US 29; rebuilt to interstate standards
North Carolina	Guilford					NC 150 – Browns Summit	Existing interchanges of US 29 (upgrade to interstate standards, scheduled 8-8-26)
North Carolina	Guilford					Benaja Road	Existing interchanges of US 29 (upgrade to interstate standards, scheduled 8-8-26)
North Carolina	Rockingham				145	US 29 Bus. north	Existing interchange of US 29; upgraded to interstate standards
North Carolina	Rockingham	Reidsville			149	To US 158 west / NC 87 (Freeway Drive) – Reidsville, Burlington	Already at Interstate Standards
North Carolina	Rockingham	Reidsville			150	Barnes Street – Reidsville Downtown	Existing interchanges of US 29; upgraded to interstate standards
North Carolina	Rockingham				153	US 158 / NC 14 (Freeway Drive) – Reidsville, Eden, Yanceyville	Existing interchanges of US 29; upgraded to interstate standards
North Carolina	Rockingham				156	Narrow Gauge Road	Existing interchanges of US 29 (built to interstate standards, signed future due to no connection to interstate)
North Carolina	Rockingham				159	US 29 Bus. south to NC 87 north	Existing interchanges of US 29 (built to interstate standards, signed future due to no connection to interstate)
North Carolina	Rockingham	Ruffin			161	Mayfield Road	Existing interchanges of US 29 (built to interstate standards, signed future due to no connection to interstate)
North Carolina	Caswell				165	Law Road	Existing interchanges of US 29 (built to interstate standards, signed future due to no connection to interstate)
North Carolina	Caswell				167	NC 700 (Shady Grove Road) – Eden	Existing interchanges of US 29 (built to interstate standards, signed future due to no connection to interstate)
North Carolina	Caswell				169	US 58 west / US 29 Bus. north – Danville, Martinsville	Existing interchanges of US 29 (built to interstate standards, signed future due to no connection to interstate)
					North Carolina–Virginia state line		
Virginia	City of Danville					Corning Drive	Existing interchanges of US 29 / US 58 (built to interstate standards, signed future due to no connection to interstate)
Virginia	City of Danville					Elizabeth Street Extended	Existing interchanges of US 29 / US 58 (built to interstate standards, signed future due to no connection to interstate)
Virginia	City of Danville					SR 86 (Main Street) – Yanceyville, Chapel Hill	Existing interchanges of US 29 / US 58 (built to interstate standards, signed future due to no connection to interstate)
Virginia	City of Danville					Goodyear Boulevard	Existing interchanges of US 29 / US 58 (built to interstate standards, signed future due to no connection to interstate)
Virginia	City of Danville					River Park Drive – Dan Daniel Memorial Park	Existing interchanges of US 29 / US 58 (built to interstate standards, signed future due to no connection to interstate)
Virginia	City of Danville					US 58 east / US 360 / US 58 Bus. west – South Boston, Danville	Existing interchanges of US 29 / US 58 (built to interstate standards, signed future due to no connection to interstate)
Virginia	City of Danville				—	US 29 north – Lynchburg	Continuation as US 29
1.000 mi = 1.609 km; 1.000 km = 0.621 mi: Concurrency terminus; Unopened
