= Zeb Alley =

American lawyer, lobbyist, and politician

Zebulon Alley

Member of the North Carolina State Senate
- In office 1971–1973

Personal details
- Born: August 9, 1928 Sylva, North Carolina, U.S.
- Died: July 11, 2013 (aged 84) Raleigh, North Carolina, U.S.
- Occupation: Lobbyist, Lawyer, Politician

Military service
- Battles/wars: Korean War

Zebulon Doyle "Zeb" Alley (August 9, 1928 – July 11, 2013) was an American lawyer, lobbyist, and politician. He served as a member of the North Carolina State Senate from 1971 to 1973, as a Democrat.

Born in Sylva, North Carolina, he graduated from high school at Oak Ridge Military Academy.

Alley served in the Korean War with the United States Army. He was decorated with the Bronze Star and the Purple Heart.

He qualified as a lawyer and was a graduate of the University of North Carolina at Chapel Hill. Alley sat in the North Carolina Senate during the 1971 session. He subsequently held a seat on the North Carolina Board of Alcohol Beverage Control, and from 1980 to 1984 was legislative counsel to Governor Jim Hunt. His legislative service continued to distinguish him decades later: when the most influential lobbyists at the North Carolina General Assembly were ranked after the 2007 session, he was one of only five figures among the 55 listed who had previously sat in the legislature.

For more than twenty years Alley ran his own lobbying and consulting practice, later moving to the law firm Nelson Mullins.

He was among the state's most highly rated lobbyists for years. In the biennial rankings compiled by the North Carolina Center for Public Policy Research – an independent, nonpartisan body that surveys legislators, registered lobbyists and journalists covering state government – Alley placed either first or second for upward of ten years, and from the early 1990s onward never fell below sixth. By the time of the survey covering the 2005 session, Don Beason had displaced him at the head of the table, ending a lengthy spell in which Alley had held the leading position. He was placed fifth after the 2007 session. The rankings released in 2012, which recorded a marked shift toward lobbyists with Republican connections following the change of control in the General Assembly, saw Alley fall to twenty-fourth.

Energy companies formed a recurring part of his client base. According to the campaign finance watchdog group Democracy North Carolina, Alley was retained as a contract lobbyist by both Duke Power and Carolina Power & Light, and the organization described him as being rated the most influential lobbyist in the state on a consistent basis. After Beason gave up his practice in 2007, his former client Progress Energy engaged a team consisting of Alley, John Bode and Kathy Hawkins.

Alley commented publicly on attempts to tighten the regulation of lobbying in North Carolina. Asked in 2005 about proposals then before the General Assembly, he doubted they would alter the balance of the profession, arguing that a uniform set of rules would leave the most effective practitioners effective still.

Alley died on July 11, 2013, in Raleigh, North Carolina, at the age of 84. His death was made public by Thom Tillis, then Speaker of the House. Both chambers of the General Assembly marked his passing, a reflection of the standing he had acquired as a fixture of the legislative building. He had a reputation for courtesy toward colleagues and acquaintances in a trade not known for it, and acted as a mentor to a number of people working in and around the legislature, among them the lobbyist Ken Melton, who credited Alley with giving him his start in the business.
