= North Carolina Highway 68 =

North–south state highway in North Carolina

North Carolina Highway 68
- Route of NC 68 in red

Route information
- Maintained by NCDOT
- Length: 30.8 mi (49.6 km)
- Existed: 1930–present

Major junctions
- South end: US 29 / US 70 in Thomasville
- I-74 in High Point; I-40 / US 421 in Greensboro; I-73 in Greensboro; US 158 in Stokesdale
- North end: I-73 / US 220 near Stokesdale

Location
- Country: United States
- State: North Carolina
- Counties: Davidson, Guilford, Rockingham

Highway system
- North Carolina Highway System; Interstate; US; State; Scenic
← NC 67	→ NC 69

North Carolina Highway 68 (NC 68) is a north–south state highway in North Carolina. It serves as a connector between Interstate 40 (I-40)/ U.S. Route 421 (US 421) and Piedmont Triad International Airport (via I-73). On its routing from Thomasville to Stokesdale, NC 68 passes through urban High Point, the western outskirts of Greensboro, and the town of Oak Ridge.

== Route description ==
Beginning in the south with the junction with US 29/US 70, the route travels north out of Thomasville in Davidson County as National Highway, a name which referred to the former routing of US 29/70 (later US 29A/70A) along this segment. Crossing from Davidson County into neighboring Guilford County and the city of High Point, NC 68 is cosigned with English Road. Approximately one mile (1.6 km) within the city limits, NC 68 turns left onto Westchester Drive, a boulevard which bypasses the High Point downtown area. Arriving at the Main Street intersection, NC 68 continues onto Eastchester Drive. The route have direct access with I-74 (High Point East Belt) with the parclo interchange, and further north, intersects with Wendover Avenue. NC 68 enters into the city limits of Greensboro, entering into the developed district in the western areas of the city.

Further north, NC 68 becomes expressway-grade, with the interchange with Interstate 40/US 421. NC 68 continues, with the exit with W. Market Street giving access to Colfax. Further north are the I-73 exits. Piedmont Triad International Airport is directly connected to this point, with ramps connecting NC 68 North to I-73 South, and I-73 North to NC 68 South for access. After the near-adjacent second I-73 exit, NC 68 downgrades to two lanes. From here, the route heads north through the heart of Oak Ridge, North Carolina, passing the Oak Ridge Military Academy at the route's intersection with NC 150. After crossing the Haw River into Stokesdale, NC 68 crosses US 158 and joins NC 65 for a short 1-mile (1.6 km) concurrency, before splitting to the northeast en route to its northern terminus at US 220 in Rockingham County. This interchange doubles as the current northern terminus of I-73 though no direct access is provided between I-73 and NC 68.

== History ==
The first NC 68 was an original state highway that traversed from NC 60, in Millers Creek (west of Wilkesboro), northwest through Glendale Springs, Jefferson and Crumpler, before crossing into Virginia. By 1928, NC 68 was rerouted west of Jefferson onto new primary routing west to the Tennessee state line; the old alignment becoming NC 681. In 1929, all of NC 68 was replaced by an extension of NC 16.

The second and current NC 68 was established in 1930 as a new primary routing from US 70/US 170/NC 10, northeast of High Point, to NC 65, in Stokesdale. In 1936, NC 68 was rerouted south through High Point to US 29A/US 70A (Lexington Avenue); its old alignment, along Penny Road, became a secondary road. In 1941, NC 68 was extended north on new primary routing to US 220 (Sylvania Road).

In 1952, NC 68 was extended north to its current terminus with the then new US 220 bypass, replacing part of old US 220 (Sylvania Road). Between 1950 and 1953, NC 68 was extended south to English Street. In 1956 or 1957, NC 68 was extended to its current southern terminus, sharing a concurrency with US 29A/US 70A, until 1991. In 1982, NC 68 was rerouted onto a newly opened expressway connecting I-40 and new access to the Piedmont Triad International Airport, with its old alignment along Bull Road (which become Regional Road) becoming a secondary road, in which a portion of the road had been removed.

== Major intersections ==
County	Location	mi	km	Destinations	Notes
Davidson	Thomasville	0.0– 0.2	0.0– 0.32	US 29 / US 70 / National Highway – Lexington, Greensboro	Southern terminus; interchange
Guilford	High Point	9.0– 9.1	14.5– 14.6	I-74 – Asheboro, Winston-Salem	I-74 exit 67
Guilford	Greensboro	14.9– 15.1	24.0– 24.3	I-40 / US 421 – Winston-Salem, Greensboro	To Piedmont Triad Farmers Market; South end of Expressway
Guilford	Greensboro	16.1– 16.4	25.9– 26.4	Market Street – Colfax	Folded diamond interchange
Guilford	Greensboro	16.7– 17.3	26.9– 27.8	Cornerstone Drive	Trumpet Interchange
Guilford	Greensboro	17.5– 17.9	28.2– 28.8	I-73 south – Asheboro, PTI-GSO Airport	I-73 exit 110; exit from I-73 to NC 68 southbound and entrance to I-73 northbound from NC 68 northbound only
Guilford	Greensboro	18.7– 19.0	30.1– 30.6	I-73 – Martinsville, Asheboro, PTI-GSO Airport	I-73 exit 111; North End of Expressway
Guilford	Oak Ridge	21.9	35.2	NC 150 (Oak Ridge Road) – Kernersville, Summerfield	
Guilford	Stokesdale	26.6	42.8	US 158 – Reidsville, Winston-Salem	
Guilford	Stokesdale	27.3	43.9	NC 65 west (Belews Creek Road) – Winston-Salem	West end of NC 65 overlap
Guilford	Stokesdale	28.0	45.1	NC 65 east – Reidsville	East end of NC 65 overlap
Rockingham		30.8	49.6	US 220 north / I-73 – Madison, Stoneville	Northern terminus; interchange; northern terminus of I-73, no access to I-73/US 220 southbound / from I-73/US 220 northbound; Continuation as US 220 North
1.000 mi = 1.609 km; 1.000 km = 0.621 mi: Concurrency terminus; Incomplete access
