= Piedmont Triad International Airport =

Airport in North Carolina, US

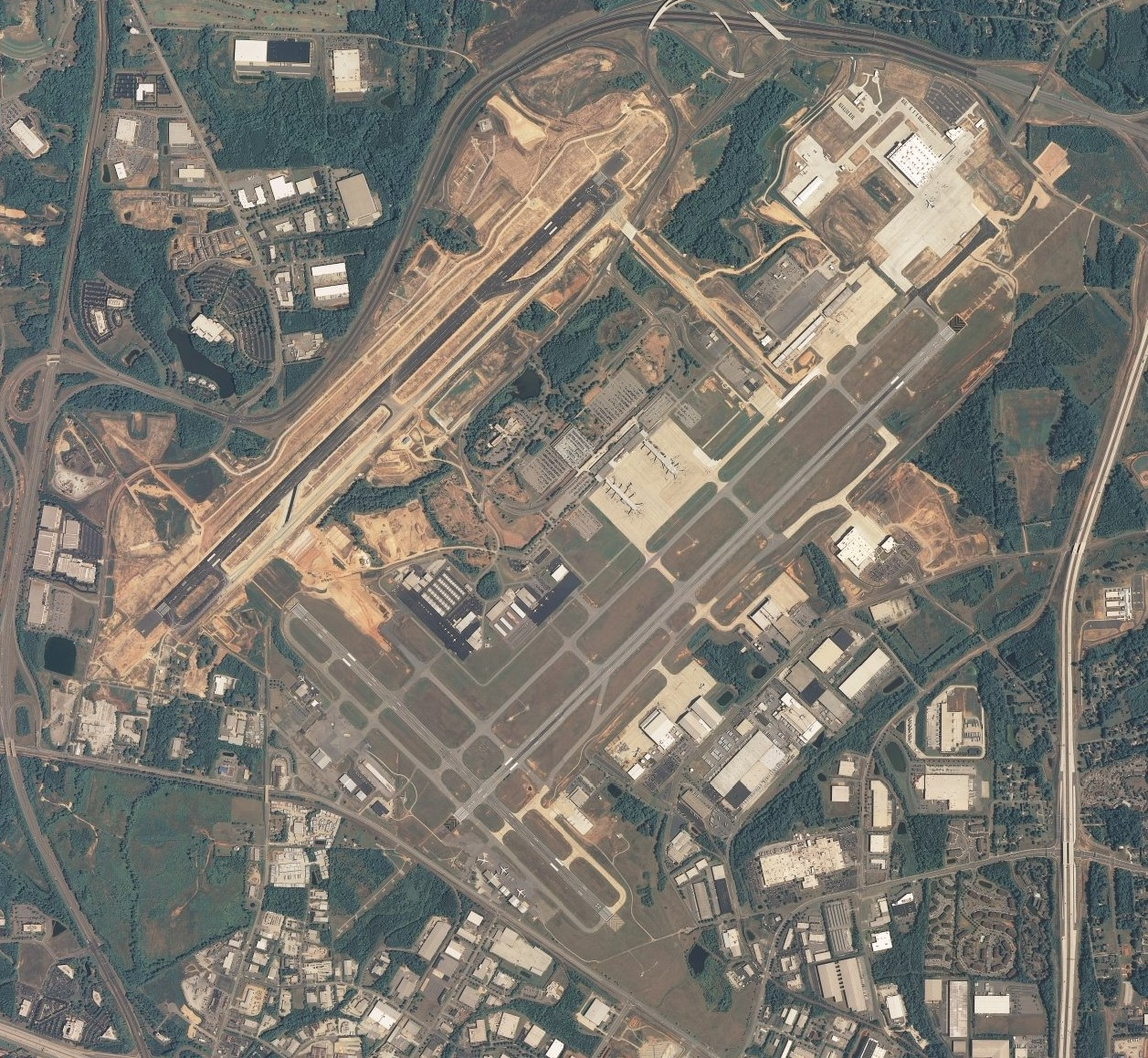
- USGS 2006 orthophoto
- IATA: GSO; ICAO: KGSO; FAA LID: GSO; WMO: 72317

Summary
- Airport type: Public
- Owner/Operator: Piedmont Triad Airport Authority
- Serves: Greensboro, High Point, and Winston-Salem, North Carolina
- Location: Guilford County, near Greensboro, North Carolina
- Hub for: FedEx Express
- Elevation AMSL: 926 ft (282 m)
- Coordinates: 36°05′52″N 79°56′14″W
- Website: FlyFromPTI.com

Maps
- FAA airport diagram
- Interactive map of Piedmont Triad International Airport

Runways
| Direction | Length | | Surface |
| Direction | ft | m | Surface |
|---|---|---|---|
| 5L/23R | 9,000 | 2,743 | Asphalt |
| 5R/23L | 10,001 | 3,048 | Asphalt/concrete |
| 14/32 | 6,380 | 1,945 | Asphalt |

Statistics (2025)
- Total Passengers: 2,029,298 ▲0.04%
- Total cargo (freight+mail): 194,484,883 lbs.
- Aircraft operations (2024): 93,157
- Source: Federal Aviation Administration

Piedmont Triad International Airport (IATA: GSO, ICAO: KGSO, FAA LID: GSO; commonly referred to locally as "PTI") is an airport located in unincorporated Guilford County, North Carolina, west of Greensboro, serving the Piedmont Triad region of Greensboro, High Point and Winston-Salem in North Carolina, United States. The airport, located just off Bryan Boulevard, sits on a 3,770 acre (1,526 ha) campus and has three runways. It is the third busiest airport in North Carolina in terms of airplane movements, averaging 280 takeoffs and landings each day. As of 2025, GSO ranks 103rd in passenger arrivals and departures in the U.S., offering passenger service to 14 U.S. destinations. PTI is owned and operated by the Piedmont Triad Airport Authority.

This airport is included in the National Plan of Integrated Airport Systems for 2011–2015, which categorized it as a primary commercial service airport since it has over 10,000 passenger boardings (enplanements) per year.

A proposal to rename the airport to "Central North Carolina International Airport" passed in December 2017; the renaming was slated to become effective on January 1, 2018. Due to public objections, however, the name change is on hold.

== History ==
Maynard Field, a predecessor of PTI Airport and one of the first commercial airports in the South, was dedicated on December 6, 1919, just west of Greensboro near Oak Ridge. With its two intersecting runways measuring 1,890 feet (580 m) and 1,249 feet (381 m), hangar space, and even an early day equivalent of a Fixed-Base Operator that made sure the torches were lit at dusk, Maynard Field was named to honor a young North Carolinian pilot named Lt. Belvin Maynard. By 1922 it had competition to the west with Miller Field in Winston-Salem, and Charles Field, a single airstrip that was used mainly for barnstorming, and for take-off drills and landings for the Charles family.

Piedmont Triad International Airport had its start in 1927 when the Tri-City Airport Commission selected 112 acres (45 ha) near the community of Friendship for an airport, and petitioned to become a stop along the congressionally authorized airmail route from New York to New Orleans. Racing pilot Captain Roscoe Turner referred to the current location of Piedmont Triad International Airport as "the best landing field in the south". Friendship, near Greensboro, was selected over neighboring Winston-Salem, which subsequently refused to contribute funds for airport construction and nullified the Tri-City Airport Authority collaborative effort.

Greensboro and Guilford County jointly purchased the Friendship property from Paul C. and Helen G. Lindley, and named it Lindley Field in May 1927 with 12,000 people in attendance. The field then had no runways, no lights, no hangar, and no passenger station. Charles Lindbergh stopped at Lindley Field with the Spirit of St. Louis on his cross-country tour celebrating the advances of aviation on October 14, 1927. Regular mail service started in 1928.

Pitcairn Aviation, Incorporated, was given the contract to fly the airmail route, the second official airmail route in the United States, and made the first delivery of airmail in North Carolina on May 1, 1928. Sid Malloy, the pilot of the aircraft, landed with two bags of mail and took three bags of mail to be sent to Atlanta. After a brief closure during the Great Depression, the airport reopened on May 17, 1937, with two all-weather runways. In time, Pitcairn Aviation built a hangar; Greensboro built a passenger station; the United States government established a weather bureau; and the Department of Commerce set up a radio tower. Passenger service was inaugurated by Dixie Flying Service on November 6, 1930, with a route to Washington, D.C. Pitcairn Aviation took over the route under its new name Eastern Air Transport, which later became Eastern Air Lines.

In July 1942, responsibility for the airport was given to the Greensboro-High Point Airport Authority, with representatives from Greensboro, High Point, and Guilford County. Shortly thereafter the Army Air Corps requisitioned the airport and its facilities for war use and airmail and passenger service was discontinued. The corps lengthened the runways and built a new passenger terminal. Civilian service resumed after the war, though growth was moderate due to the success of nearby Smith Reynolds Airport in Winston-Salem.

A new passenger terminal opened in 1958, replacing the temporary facility that had served since World War II. The terminal was a modern glass paneled structure with a single pier. PTI was then served by Eastern, Piedmont, and Capital (which merged with United in 1961). The April 1957 Official Airline Guide showed departures each weekday by Eastern (17), Piedmont (9), and Capital (7).

During the 1970s the airport was renamed Greensboro–High Point Airport and then later Greensboro–High Point–Winston-Salem Regional Airport. Work on a new facility began in 1978 and the airport gained a greater prominence on the East Coast, offering passenger service from Delta Air Lines, Piedmont Airlines, United Airlines and Eastern Air Lines. Cargo carriers, including the postal service, textile manufacturers, and Federal Express–a new overnight letter and package delivery service–were shipping tons of freight each year. By 1975, airport officials began to plan for a new terminal. Piedmont Airlines announced its intention to consolidate its operations at Greensboro, but in the months that followed, opened a hub in Charlotte instead.

The new terminal complex was completed in 1982, designed by Reynolds, Smith & Hills and AHM Architects. The following year, the Marriott opened a $16 million, 300-room hotel on the airport property. The facility was renamed Piedmont Triad International Airport in 1987.

TIMCO Aviation Services (purchased by HAECO Americas in 2014, which was in turn acquired by AAR Corp. in 2025) opened its world headquarters at PTI in 1990, and grew into one of the world's largest independent aircraft maintenance, repair and overhaul providers. In 1993, Continental Lite, established a hub at PTI, but by 1995 the hub lost its parent company, Continental Airlines $140 million and Continental ceased hub operations at PTI. In 1998 FedEx Corporation announced its intentions to build a mid-Atlantic hub at PTI, one of only five FedEx hubs in the country. In addition to the hub, the project included the construction of a parallel, 9,000-foot runway.

Delta Connection carrier Comair built a maintenance hangar at PTI to perform work on their CRJ's in 2005. The airport also opened an expansion to the North Concourse, which added another 40,000 square feet to the terminal and brought the number of gates to 25. It also opened a 43,000 square-foot expansion to the main terminal to accommodate security gates at the north and south concourse.

FedEx opened its mid-Atlantic Hub at the Airport in 2003, and in 2006, Honda Aircraft Company selected PTI as its global headquarters. Allegiant Air began service to Orlando Sanford International Airport and St. Petersburg–Clearwater International Airport in late May 2007.

The airport completed a new 9,000-foot parallel runway in 2010. In 2011 PTI began a renovation project that included new furnishings, automated baggage handling, free wireless internet, charging stations for passenger devices, and interactive kiosks to guide passengers to ground transportation, lodging, and restaurants.

In July 2017 American Eagle announced non-stop service to Chicago–O'Hare International Airport. In September 2018 Spirit Airlines announced service to Fort Lauderdale, Orlando, and Tampa. However, Spirit Airlines discontinued service from Greensboro in 2021.

On February 20, 2025, Breeze Airways announced it would begin service at Greensboro. Starting on June 6, 2025, Breeze Airways would offer direct flights to Hartford and Orlando airports.

During 2025 a maintenance and engineering facility operated by Marshall USA (part of the British Marshall Group) was built on the north east sector corner of the airport.

== Terminals and facilities ==
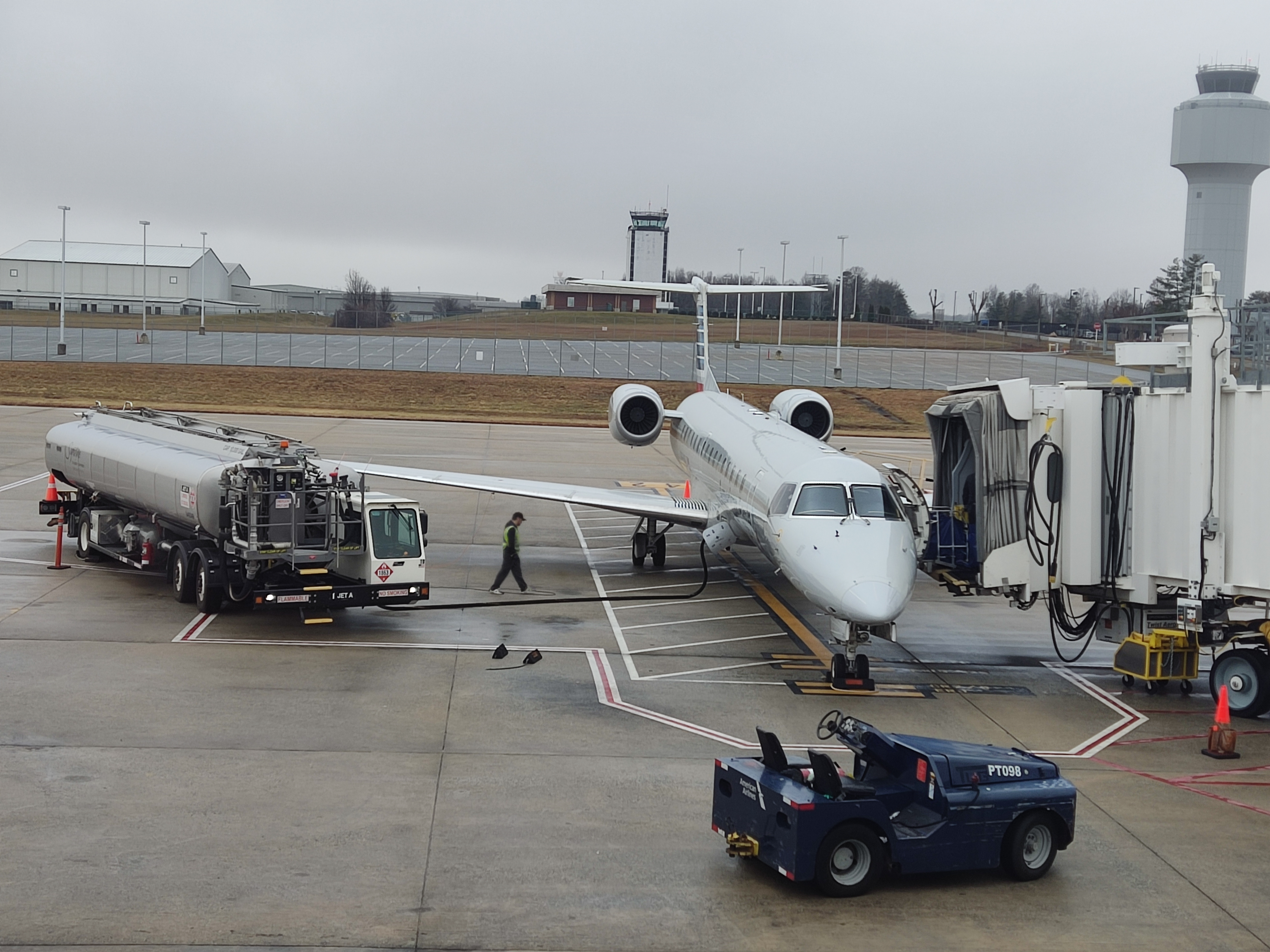
Envoy Air operated for American Airlines ERJ-145LR (N931AE) at GSO

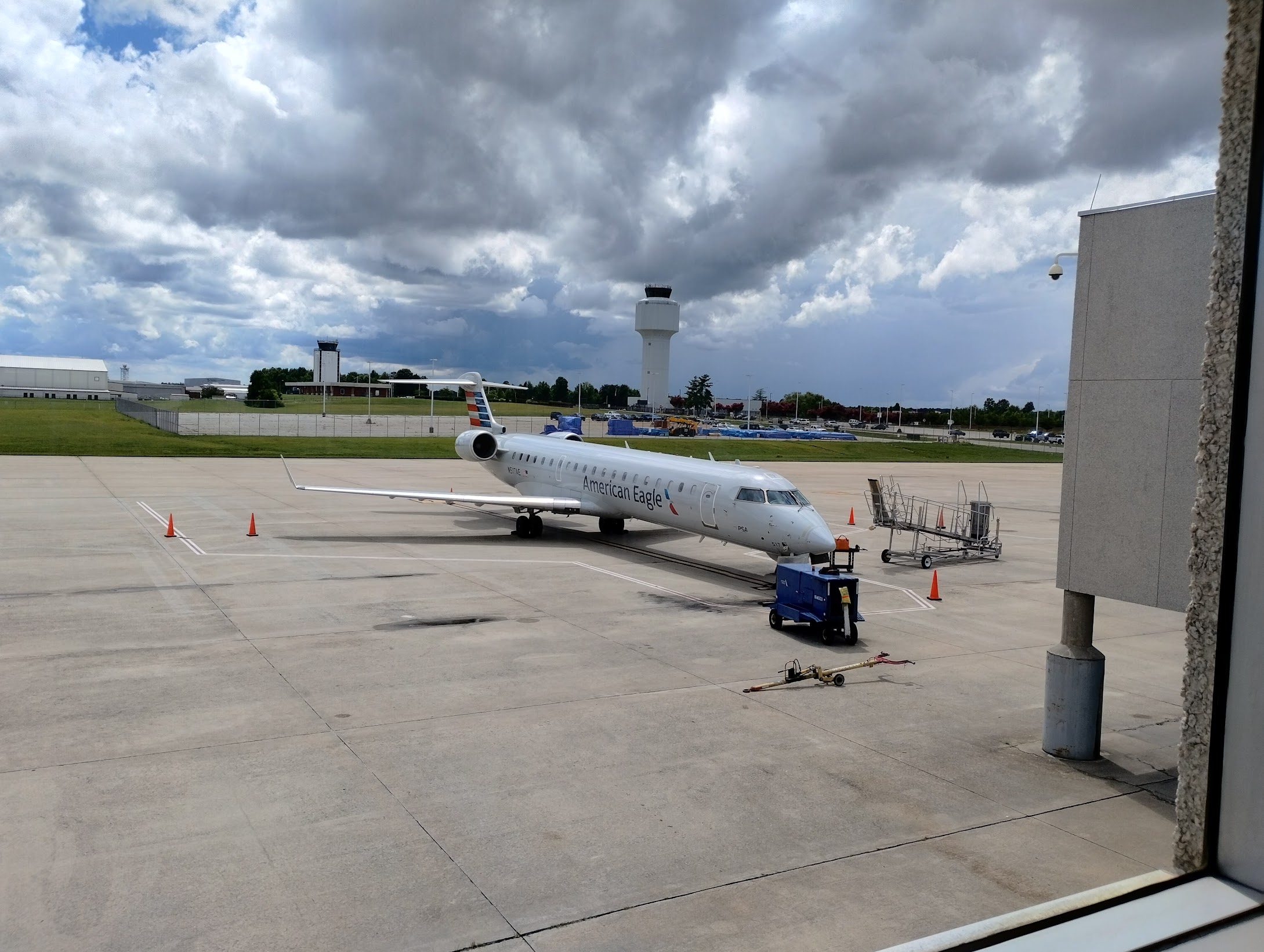
American Eagle by PSA Airlines CRJ-701ER (N517AE) at GSO

Completed in 1982, the terminal building of Piedmont Triad International Airport currently has 26 passenger gates: 14 on the north concourse, and 12 on the south concourse. A 2006 expansion added another 40,000 square feet (3,700 m^{2}) to the terminal (at a cost of $5 million); a substantial part of this space was used to establish more permanent security checkpoints. Both concourses are the same size, despite the different gate numbers. There are two passenger accessible levels of the terminal. The top includes ticketing, security, boarding, and concession areas. The bottom floor houses baggage claim and ground transportation.

Previously a US Airways Club, American Airlines operated an Admirals Club across from Gate 45 in the south concourse. As of October 15, 2018, the Admirals Club permanently closed.

As of March 30, 2019, the airport averages 246 aircraft operations per day: 37% general aviation, 33% air taxi, 28% scheduled commercial, and 2% military. There are currently 86 aircraft based at this airport: 67 single-engine, 11 multi-engine, and 8 jet.

Among notable planes based at the airport is the DC-8 operated by the international disaster relief organization Samaritan's Purse, the last remaining in service in the United States (retired in November 2025); the airport is the home of the organization's main maintenance facility and also houses a Boeing 757 and a Boeing 767.

21 Air, headquartered in Greensboro, operates daily scheduled cargo services as DHL Aviation. iAero Airways operated a maintenance base at the airport until the company's closure in 2024.

== Airlines and destinations ==
=== Passenger ===
| Airlines | Destinations |
|---|---|
| Allegiant Air | St. Petersburg/Clearwater; Seasonal: Orlando/Sanford |
| American Airlines | Charlotte, Dallas/Fort Worth |
| American Eagle | Charlotte, Chicago–O'Hare, Miami, New York–LaGuardia, Philadelphia, Washington–National; Seasonal: Dallas/Fort Worth |
| Breeze Airways | Orlando; Seasonal: Hartford |
| Delta Air Lines | Atlanta |
| Delta Connection | Detroit, New York–LaGuardia |
| United Express | Chicago–O'Hare, Newark, Washington–Dulles |

Destinations map
Destinations from Piedmont Triad International Airport
Red = Year-round destination
Green = Seasonal destination
Blue = Future destination destination
Black = Destination ending

=== Cargo ===
| Airlines | Destinations | Refs |
|---|---|---|
| DHL Aviation | Cincinnati, Richmond | |
| FedEx Express | Chicago–O'Hare, Dallas/Fort Worth, Fort Lauderdale, Newark, New York–JFK, Indianapolis, Memphis, Orlando, Raleigh/Durham | |
| FedEx Feeder operated by Mountain Air Cargo | Charleston (SC), Columbia (SC), Greenville/Spartanburg | |
| UPS Airlines | Greenville/Spartanburg, Louisville, Ontario, Roanoke | |

== Statistics ==
=== Top destinations ===
Busiest domestic routes from GSO (September 2025 - August 2026)
| Rank | City | Passengers | Carriers |
|---|---|---|---|
| 1 | (Georgia (U.S. state)) Atlanta, Georgia | 275,930 | Delta |
| 2 | Charlotte, North Carolina | 155,640 | American |
| 3 | (New York (state)) New York-La Guardia, New York | 112,880 | American, Delta |
| 4 | Dallas/Fort Worth, Texas | 101,870 | American |
| 5 | Chicago–O'Hare, Illinois | 98,300 | American, United |
| 6 | Detroit, Michigan | 45,810 | Delta |
| 7 | Philadelphia, Pennsylvania | 41,280 | American |
| 8 | Newark, New Jersey | 35,720 | United |
| 9 | Washington-National, Virginia | 32,040 | American |
| 10 | Washington-Dulles, Virginia | 28,870 | United |

=== Airline market share ===
Airline market share (September 2025 - August 2026)
| Rank | Airline | Passengers | Market share |
|---|---|---|---|
| 1 | Delta Air Lines | 545,000 | 27.41% |
| 2 | American Airlines | 263,000 | 13.23% |
| 3 | Envoy Air | 253,000 | 12.76% |
| 4 | Piedmont Airlines | 204,000 | 10.25% |
| 5 | Republic Airways | 197,000 | 9.93% |
| 6 | Other | 525,000 | 26.41% |

=== Annual traffic ===
GSO Airport Annual Passengers and Total Cargo 2008–Present
| Year | Passengers | Total cargo (lbs.) |
|---|---|---|
| 2008 | N/A | 153,071,408 |
| 2009 | 1,714,424 | 178,207,217 |
| 2010 | 1,680,953 | 190,621,532 |
| 2011 | 1,777,025 | 189,897,571 |
| 2012 | 1,776,087 | 195,034,338 |
| 2013 | 1,694,288 | 193,305,829 |
| 2014 | 1,667,959 | 163,797,626 |
| 2015 | 1,683,950 | 152,099,110 |
| 2016 | 1,686,966 | 146,265,503 |
| 2017 | 1,758,396 | 166,946,535 |
| 2018 | 1,873,928 | 188,086,359 |
| 2019 | 2,145,929 | 253,213,337 |
| 2020 | 754,752 | 211,196,009 |
| 2021 | 1,255,735 | 340,343,409 |
| 2022 | 1,568,775 | 347,351,454 |
| 2023 | 1,763,330 | 281,564,653 |
| 2024 | 1,959,182 | 191,669,427 |
| 2025 | 2,029,298 | 194,484,883 |

== Fixed-base operators ==
The following fixed-base operators are based at the Piedmont Triad International Airport:

- Signature Aviation
- Koury Aviation

== Future developments ==
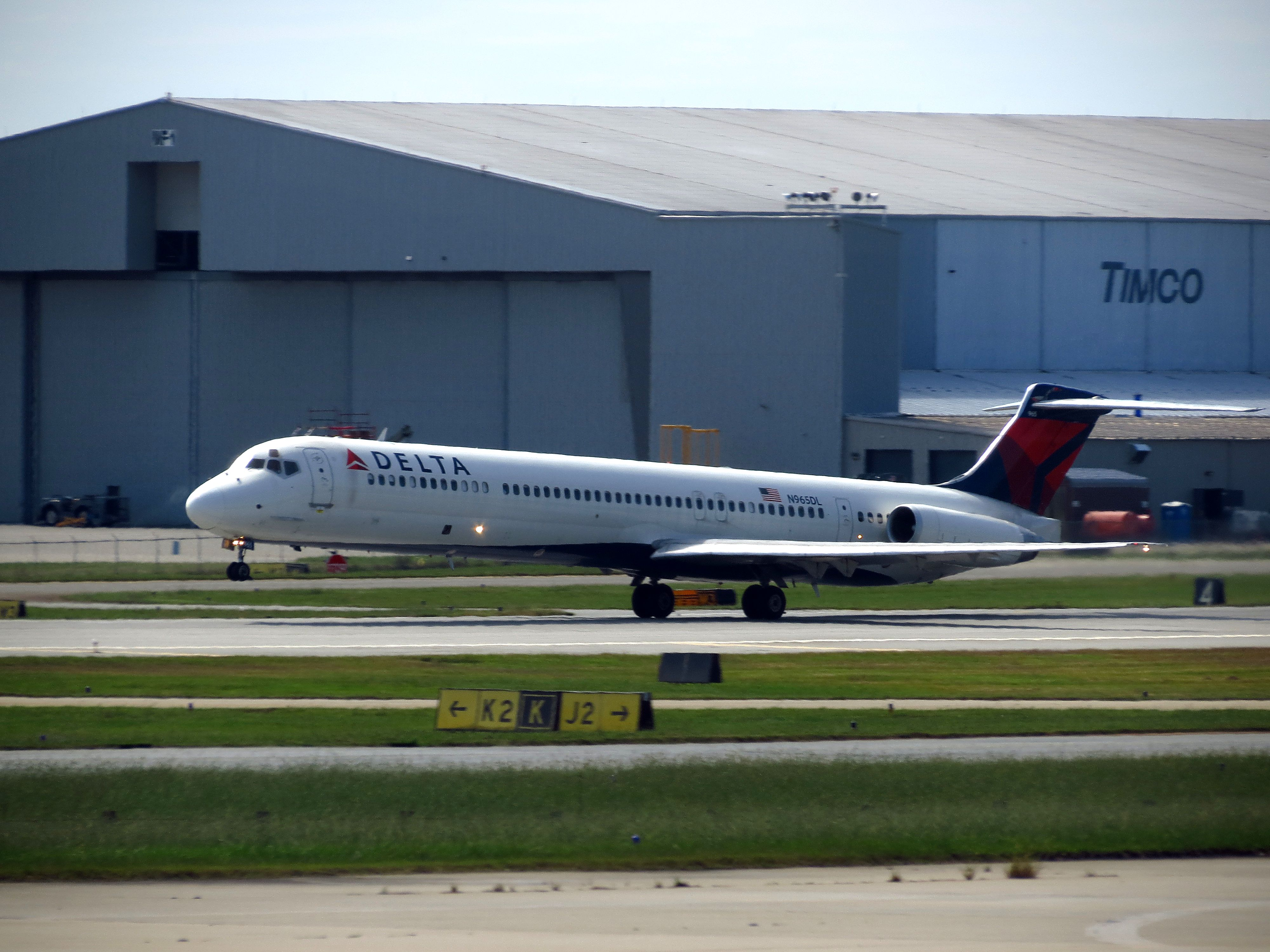
Delta Air Lines McDonnell Douglas MD-88 taking off from Piedmont Triad International Airport, bound for Atlanta

A significant investment is being made into the interstate highway network adjacent to the airport, which will result in easy access from industrial sites around the airport on interstate highways leading north, south, east and west. Major highways such as I-40, I-85 and I-74 are already in place, with connectors under construction and coming on line in the near future.

As part of the I-73 construction, a taxiway was built to allow approximately 400 acres of property north of Future I-73 to access the airport.

Construction of a new air traffic control tower began in April 2019 and is projected to be commissioned in 2022. This will feature a 180 foot tall tower with a 550 square foot cab for controllers. The base will be 15,650 square feet, and will house the new TRACON facility.

Boom Supersonic built a 65-acre Superfactory, where they plan to manufacture their supersonic flagship airplane, the Overture, which will begin commercial operations in 2030, with groundbreaking that occurred in late 2022 and construction completed in June 2024. The site will create 1,750 jobs, and 200 internships for the area. The project is projected to grow the state's economy by at least $32.8 billion over the next 20 years. The site will be the final assembly and manufacturing area for the airplane.

JetZero announced it will invest $4.7 billion to build its first manufacturing plant near the airport, which will produce its next-generation middle of the market passenger aircraft, the Z4, creating over 14,500 jobs.

== Accidents and incidents ==
- On February 4, 1962, a USAF Douglas C-47 climbed to 150–200 feet after takeoff and fell to the left, cartwheeled and burned. All seven on board died.
- December 22, 1996, Airborne Express Flight 827, a Douglas DC-8-63F, departed Greensboro for a test flight and was intended to return to Greensboro. However, while performing a stall test, the crew accidentally caused the aircraft to enter a real stall and used an incorrect recovery technique. The aircraft crashed in Narrows, Virginia. All six people on board were killed.
- May 8, 2008, N904FX and N905FX, two ATR-42-320s were written off after they suffered substantial damage at Piedmont Triad International Airport when the airport was hit by an EF2 tornado. Both aircraft were parked when they were struck by the tornado; one was blown into a ditch and the other was blown into a fence.

== See also ==
- List of airports in North Carolina
- North Carolina World War II Army Airfields
