= Piedmont (plateau) =

Region in the eastern United States

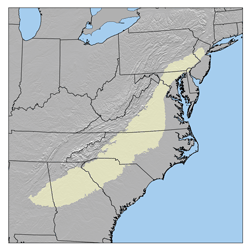
- The Piedmont in the eastern United States
- Interactive map of Piedmont
- Country: United States
- States: Virginia; North Carolina; South Carolina; Georgia; Maryland; Pennsylvania; Alabama; New Jersey; New York; Delaware

The Piedmont (/ˈpiːdmɒnt/ PEED-mont) is a plateau region located in the Eastern United States. It is situated between the Atlantic Plain and the Blue Ridge Mountains, stretching from New York in the north to central Alabama in the south. The Piedmont Province is a physiographic province of the larger Appalachian Highlands physiographic division and consists of the Piedmont Upland and Piedmont Lowland sections.

The Atlantic Seaboard Fall Line marks the Piedmont's eastern boundary with the Coastal Plain. To the west, it is mostly bounded by the Blue Ridge Mountains, the easternmost range of the Appalachians. The width of the Piedmont varies, being quite narrow above the Delaware River but nearly 300 miles (500 km) wide in North Carolina. The Piedmont's area is approximately 80,000 square miles (210,000 km^{2}).

The French word Piedmont (modern spelling Piémont) comes from the Italian Piemonte, from Latin pedemontium, meaning "foothill" or, literally, "at the foot of the mountains"; it is the name of the northwestern Italian region abutting the Alps.

== Geology ==
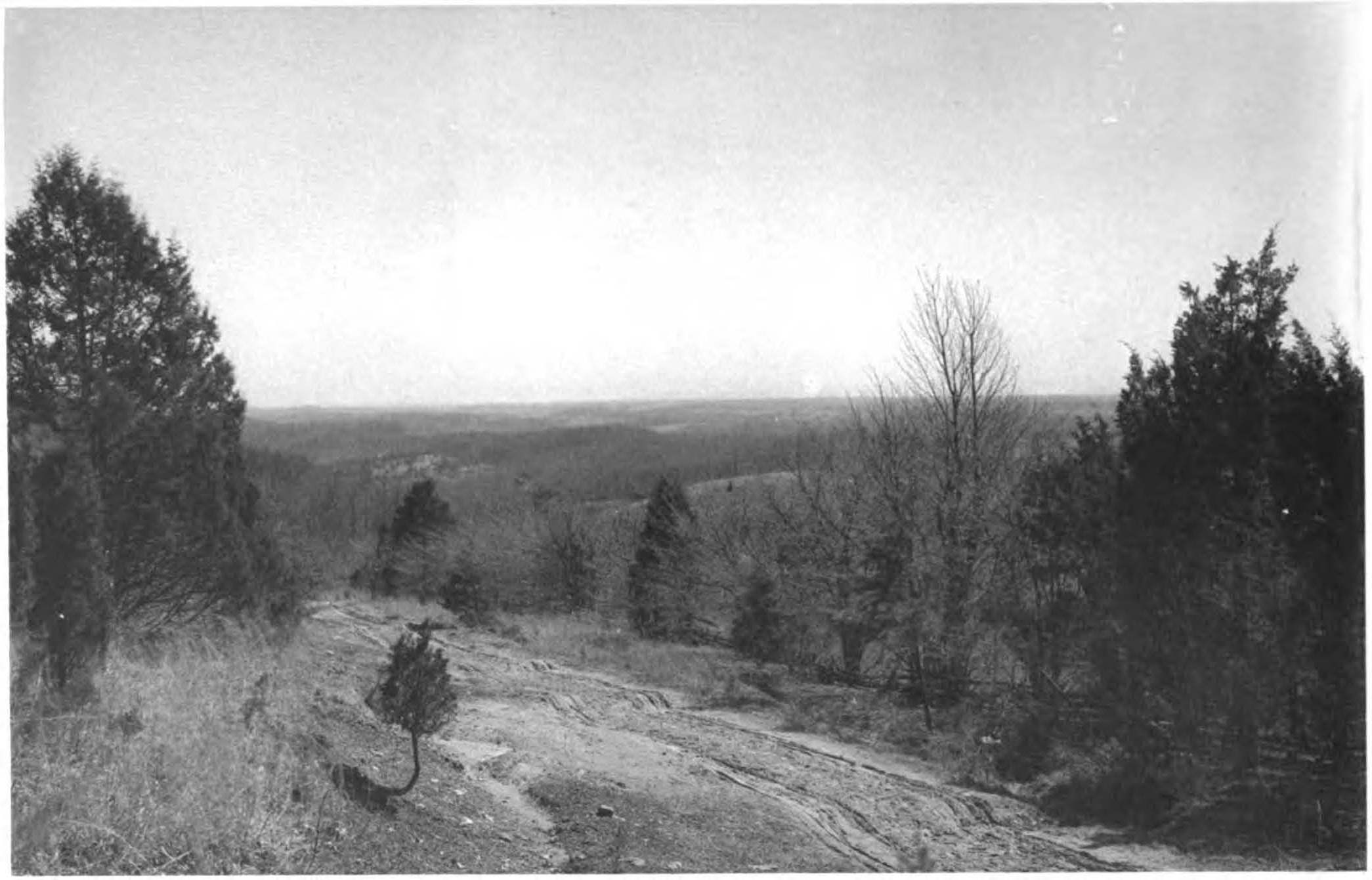
The Piedmont Plateau, looking east from Rocky Ridge in Maryland, c. 1898

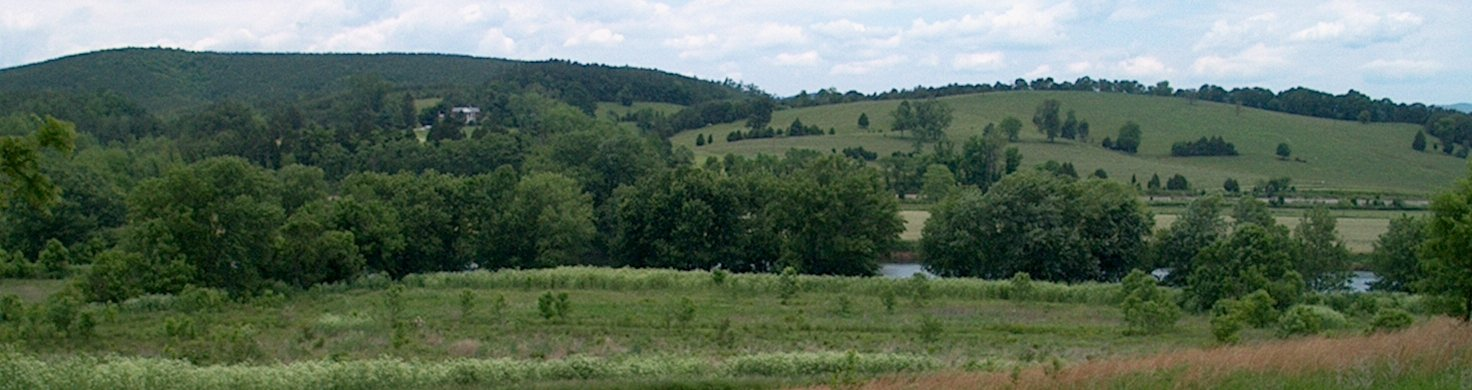
The James River winds its way among rolling Piedmont hills in central Virginia, though most hills in the Piedmont region are smaller than these.

The surface relief of the Piedmont is characterized by relatively low, rolling hills with heights above sea level between 200 feet (50 m) and 800 feet to 1,000 feet (250 m to 300 m). Its geology is complex, with numerous rock formations of different materials and ages intermingled with one another. Essentially, the Piedmont is the remnant of several ancient mountain chains that have since been eroded.

Geologists have identified at least five separate events which have led to sediment deposition, including the Grenville orogeny (the collision of continents that created the supercontinent Rodinia) and the Appalachian orogeny during the formation of Pangaea. The last major event in the history of the Piedmont was the break-up of Pangaea, when North America and Africa began to separate. Large basins formed from the rifting and were filled by the sediments shed from the surrounding higher ground. The series of Mesozoic basins is almost entirely located inside the Piedmont region.

== Ecology ==
The Piedmont ecoregion (45) is an ecoregion designated by the U.S. Environmental Protection Agency (EPA) and the Commission for Environmental Cooperation (CEC). This ecoregion comprises a transitional area between the mostly mountainous ecoregions of the Appalachians to the northwest and the relatively flat coastal plain to the southeast. It is a complex mosaic of Precambrian and Paleozoic metamorphic and igneous rocks, with moderately dissected irregular plains and some hills. The soils tend to be finer-textured than in coastal plain regions. Once largely cultivated, much of this region has reverted to successional pine and hardwood woodlands, with an increasing conversion to an urban and suburban land cover.

== Agriculture ==
Piedmont soils are generally clay-like (Ultisols and more locally Alfisols) and moderately productive. In some areas they have suffered from erosion and over-cropping, particularly in the South where cotton was historically the chief crop. In the central Piedmont region of North Carolina and Virginia, tobacco is the main crop, while in the north region there is more diversity, including orchards, dairying, and general farming.

== Music ==
The portion of the Piedmont region in the Southern United States is closely associated with the Piedmont blues, a style of blues music that originated there in the late 19th century. According to the Piedmont Blues Preservation Society, most Piedmont blues musicians came from Virginia, North and South Carolina, and Georgia. During the Great Migration, African Americans migrated to the Piedmont. With the Appalachian Mountains to the west, those who might otherwise have spread into rural areas stayed in cities and were thus exposed to a broader mixture of music than those in, for example, the rural Mississippi delta. Thus, Piedmont blues was influenced by many types of music, such as ragtime, country, and popular songs — styles that had comparatively less influence on blues music in other regions.

== Cities ==
Many major cities are located on the Atlantic Seaboard fall line, the eastern boundary of the Piedmont. (In Georgia and Alabama, where the Piedmont runs mostly east to west, the fall line is its southern boundary.) The fall line, where the land rises abruptly from the coastal plain, marks the limit of navigability on many major rivers, so inland ports sprang up along it.

Within the Piedmont region itself, there are several areas of urban concentration, the largest being the Atlanta metropolitan area in Georgia. The Piedmont cuts Maryland in half, covering the Baltimore–Washington metropolitan area. In Virginia, the Greater Richmond metropolitan area is the largest urban concentration. In North Carolina, the Piedmont Crescent includes several metropolitan clusters such as Charlotte metropolitan area, the Piedmont Triad, and the Research Triangle. Other notable areas include the Greenville-Spartanburg-Anderson, SC Combined Statistical Area in South Carolina, and the Philadelphia metropolitan area in Pennsylvania.

== See also ==
- Cecil (soil)
- Piedmont Atlantic
- Piedmont region of Virginia
- Central North Carolina
- Interstate 85
