= Trading Path =

Native American trail

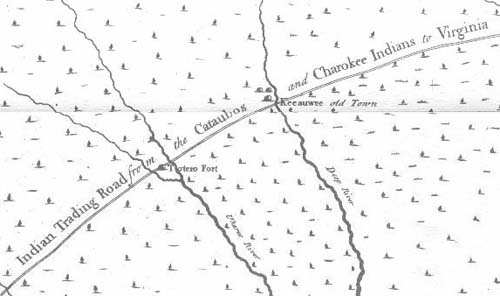
Excerpt of the 1733 Edward Moseley map of North Carolina, showing the Trading Path

The Trading Path (a.k.a. Occaneechi Path, Catawba Road etc.) was a corridor of roads and trails between the Tsenacommacah (modern-day Tidewater Virginia) and the Cherokee, Catawba, and other Native-American countries in the Piedmont region of North Carolina, South Carolina, and Georgia. Indigenous people had used and maintained much of the path for their expansive trading network for centuries prior to its use by Europeans and/or European-Americans. Native and later European/European-American settlements occupied key points along the path. That section of the Trading Path through the Carolina piedmont was also known as the Upper Road, and a portion between North Carolina and Georgia was called the Lower Cherokee Traders Path. The terminus of the path was near present-day Augusta, Georgia, a distance of 500 miles from the start of the trading path on the James River. On this southern terminus the path connected with other important paths to the west.

Both Natives and newcomers mainly used the Trading Path for commercial cargo carriage. In early colonial times, Virginian traders used the path to travel to Native American towns in the Waxhaws. They led long pack caravans of horses carrying "loads of guns, gunpowder, knives, jewelry, blankets, and hatchets, among other goods", and travel southwest to Indigenous villages along the journey to the Waxhaws region, in the vicinity of present-day Mecklenburg County. They exchanged European goods for furs and deerskins.

Because the path was well laid out through the complex geography of the piedmont area, connecting fords of many streams, it was roughly followed by the 19th-century railroad. Later, engineers who designed Interstate 85 followed much of this route again from Petersburg, Virginia, to roughly the Georgia state border. Many of the earliest towns along its route remain to this day. Many remnants of the Trading Path are still visible.

The Piedmont Urban Crescent essentially has developed along the Trading Path, and since the late 19th century has had steady growth. It is a spine of polycentric urban development in North Carolina. Cities of the Crescent are the centers of government, finance, education and research, and business in the state.
