= Central North Carolina =

Region in North America

Coordinates: 36.0°N 79.2°W

Central North Carolina, also known as the Piedmont, is a region of North Carolina. It is located between the Mountains to the west and the Coastal Plain to the east. It is the most populous region of the state, containing Charlotte, the state capital of Raleigh, and Greensboro. These cities form the Piedmont Crescent region, much of which parallels I-85. The geography of the Piedmont primarily consists of rolling hills. Historically the region has been known for furniture and textile manufacturing.

== Geography ==
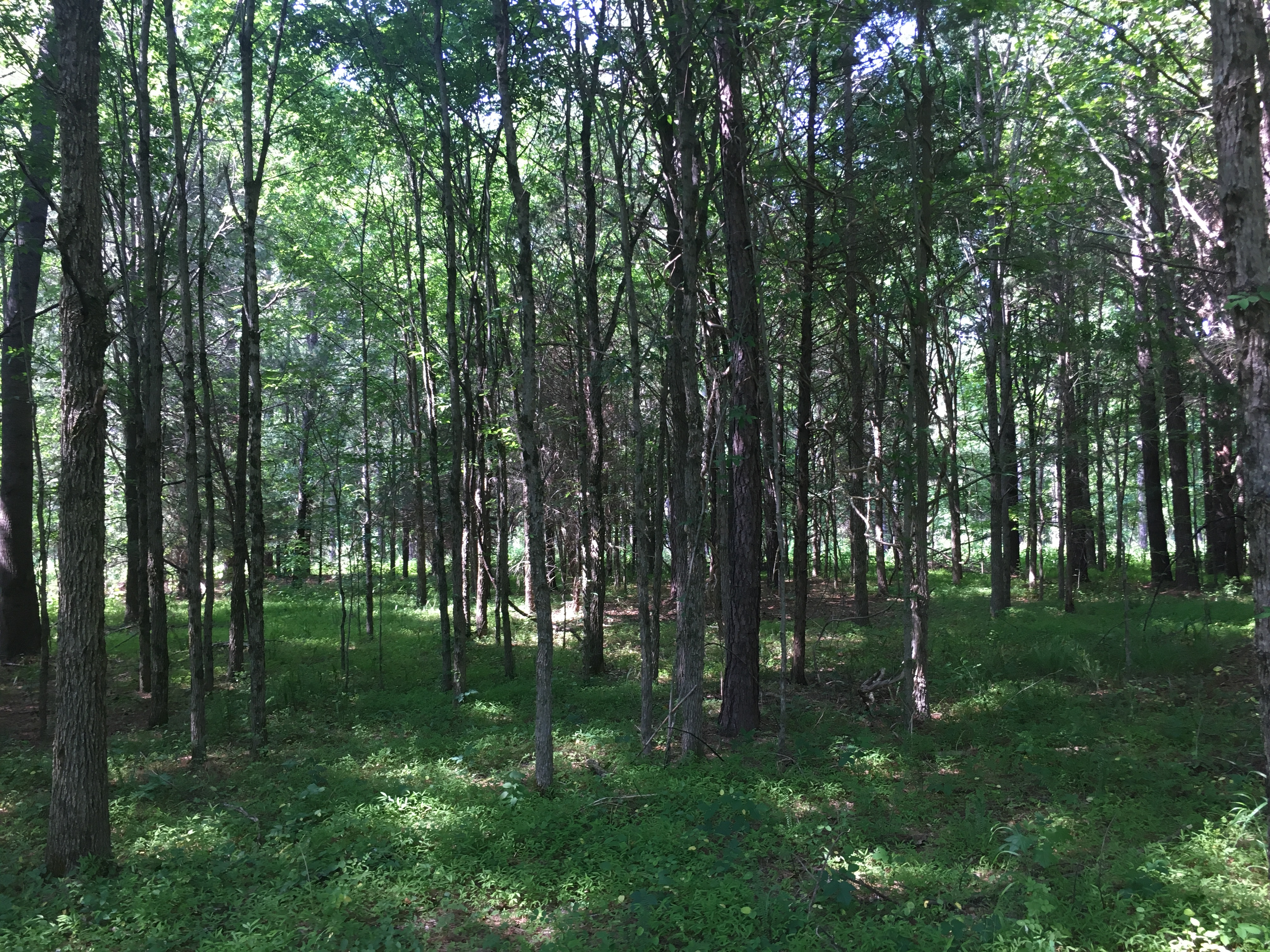
A forest in Orange County in the summer

The geography of Central North Carolina consists primarily of rolling hills with elevations generally between 300 and 1500 feet above sea level, generally sloping upward from east to west. There are some smaller mountain ranges, such as the Uwharrie Mountains. Many rivers cross the region, such as the Neuse, Cape Fear, and Pee Dee. The approximate eastern border of the Piedmont is the Fall Line, where many of these rivers have waterfalls. This was historically important as a good location for water mills, and it was the upper limit of navigability on these rivers. Some gold, coal, and iron has been found in the region. The land was historically covered with oak, hickory, and pine forests. Much of this forest has been destroyed due to agriculture and urban development, but some forests have regrown due to the abandonment of farms.

=== Climate ===
Central North Carolina has a temperate climate, with abundant precipitation year-round. Most of the region 45–50 inches (1,143–1,270 mm) of precipitation, less than either the Mountains or Coastal Plain. Average temperatures are around 40 °F (4 °C) in the winter and 80 °F (27 °C) in the summer. The region is frequently affected by the remnants of hurricanes. Hurricane Fran caused significant damage in the region. The Tornado outbreak of April 14-16, 2011, caused significant damage in this region as well as further east.

== Transportation ==
=== Highways ===
Several major interstates cross the region.

- I-40 crosses the region from Hickory in the west to Clayton in the east
- I-85 crosses the region from Kings Mountain in the southwest to Norlina in the northeast
- I-77 crosses the region from Charlotte in the south to Mount Airy in the north
- I-95 runs roughly parallel to the eastern border of the region

In addition, two major interstates are under construction in the western portion of the region

- I-73
- I-74

Cities in each of the major metropolitan areas also have auxiliary routes

Charlotte has:

- I-277
- I-485

Raleigh has:

- I-440
- I-540

Greensboro has:

- I-840
- I-785

=== Railroads ===
Amtrak runs passenger service through Central North Carolina. The Piedmont and Carolinian trains run from Raleigh to Charlotte, and other trains connect northeast to Washington, D.C., and southwest to Atlanta.

=== Airports ===
There are three major passenger airports in Central North Carolina.

- Charlotte Douglas International Airport
- Raleigh-Durham International Airport
- Piedmont Triad International Airport

== Demographics ==
The majority of North Carolina's population, and each of its five largest cities, is located in the Piedmont.

=== Cities and towns ===
==== Over 100,000 inhabitants ====
- Charlotte
- Raleigh
- Greensboro
- Durham
- Winston-Salem
- Cary
- High Point
- Concord

==== Over 20,000 inhabitants ====
- Gastonia
- Apex
- Huntersville
- Chapel Hill
- Burlington
- Kannapolis
- Mooresville
- Wake Forest
- Hickory
- Holly Springs
- Indian Trail
- Fuquay Varina
- Salisbury
- Monroe
- Garner
- Cornelius
- Morrisville
- Sanford
- Matthews
- Statesville
- Clayton (also in Eastern North Carolina)
- Thomasville
- Asheboro
- Kernersville
- Mint Hill
- Shelby
- Waxhaw
- Clemmons
- Carrboro

== See also ==
- Piedmont (United States)
- Piedmont Crescent
