= Piedmont Atlantic megaregion =

Megaregion of the southeastern USA

Coordinates: 34°N 83°W

- Megaregion of the United States
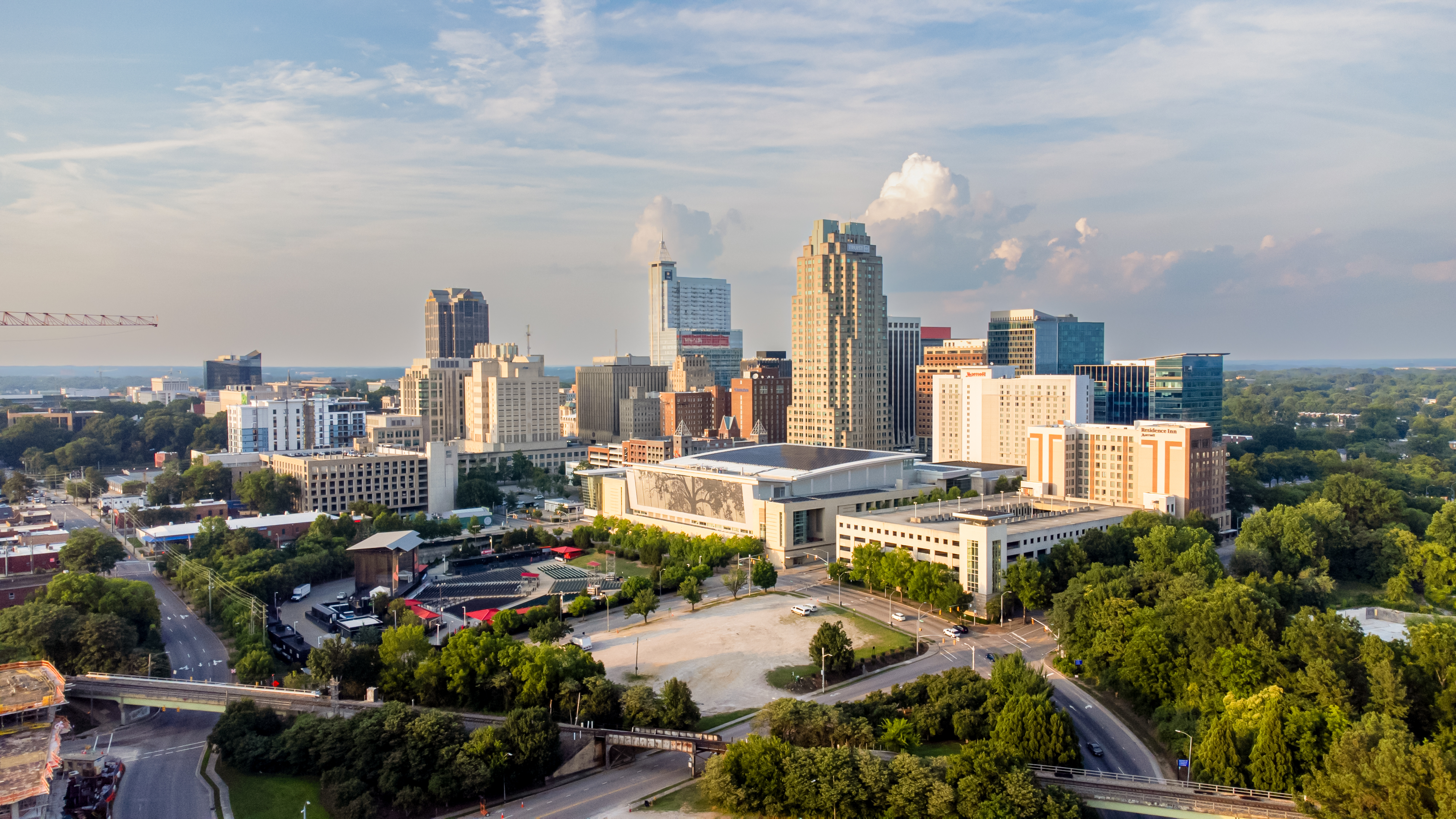
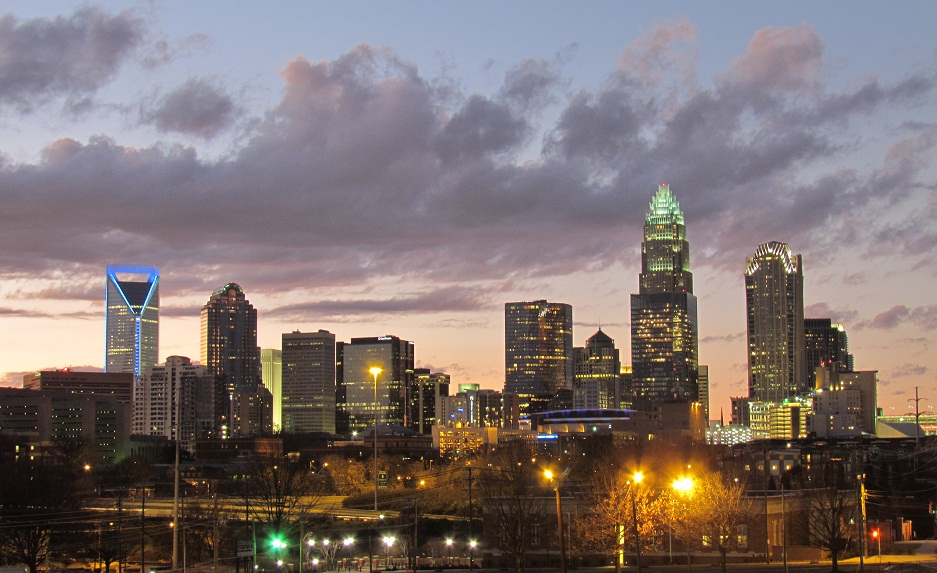
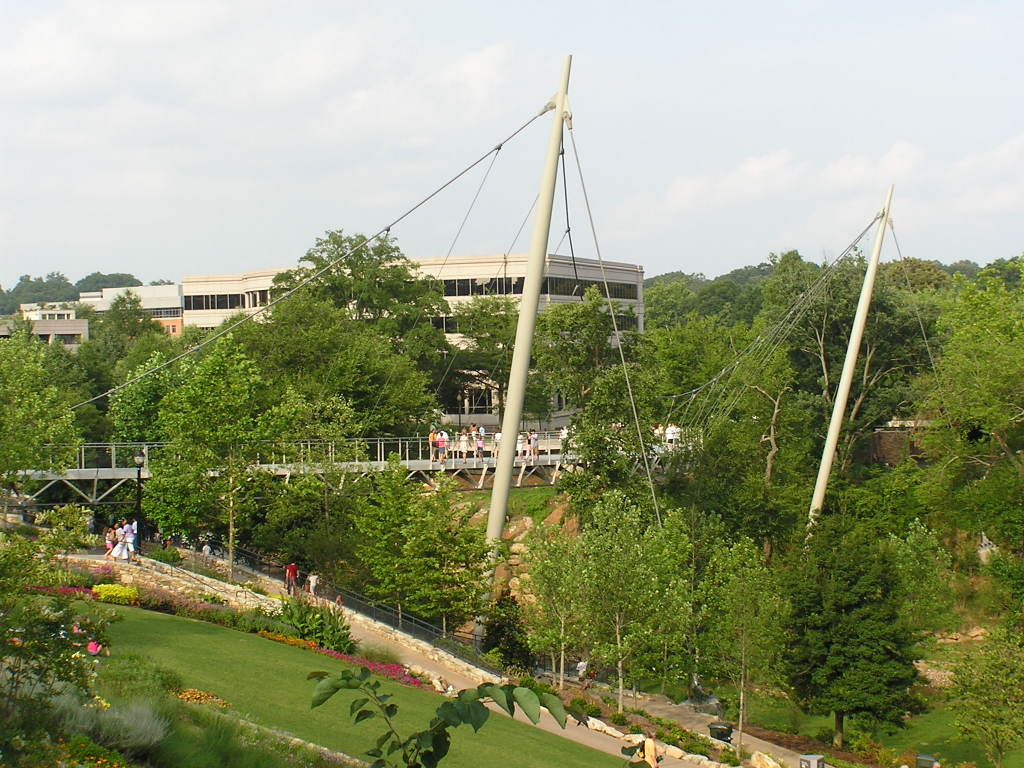
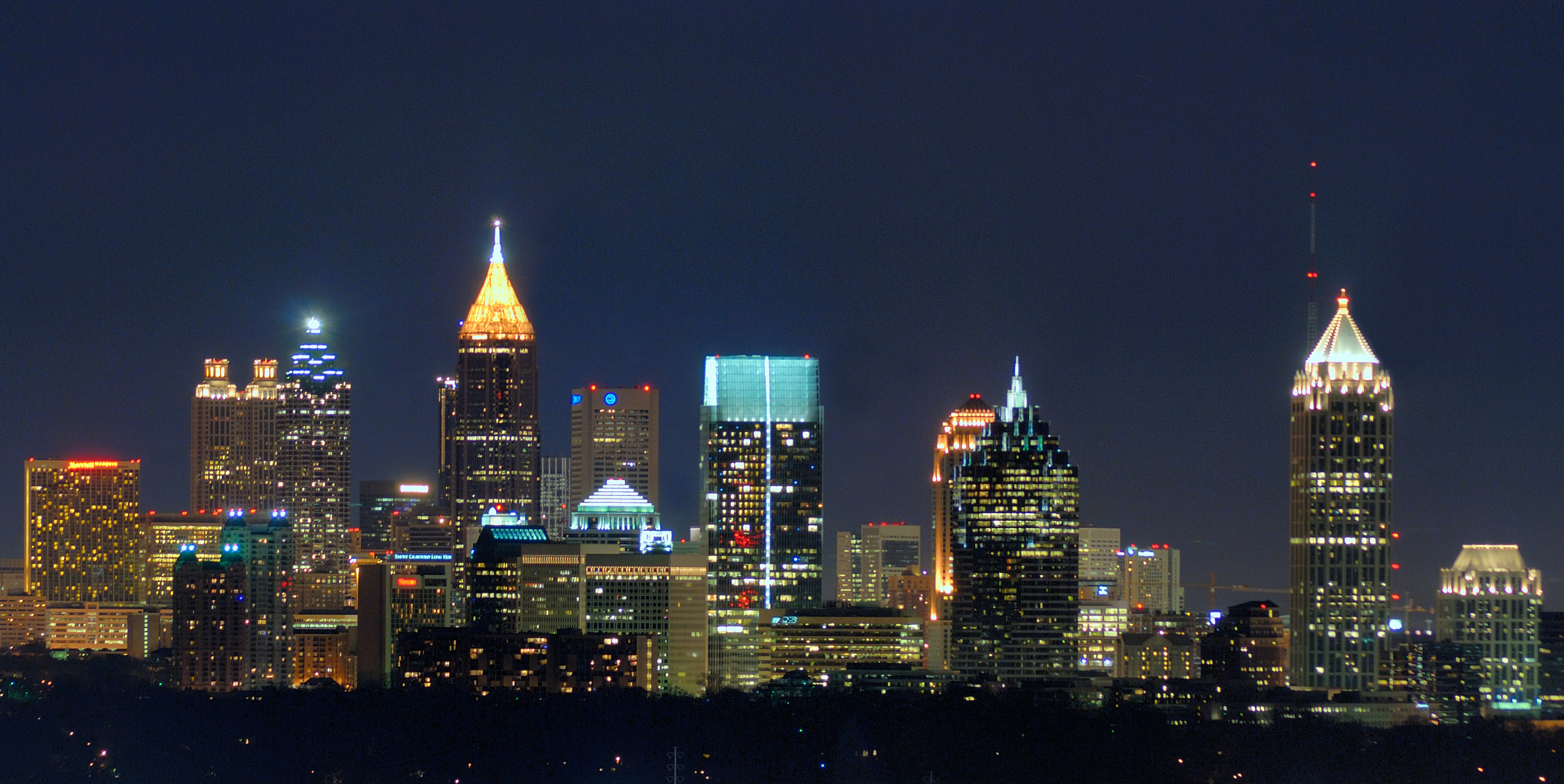
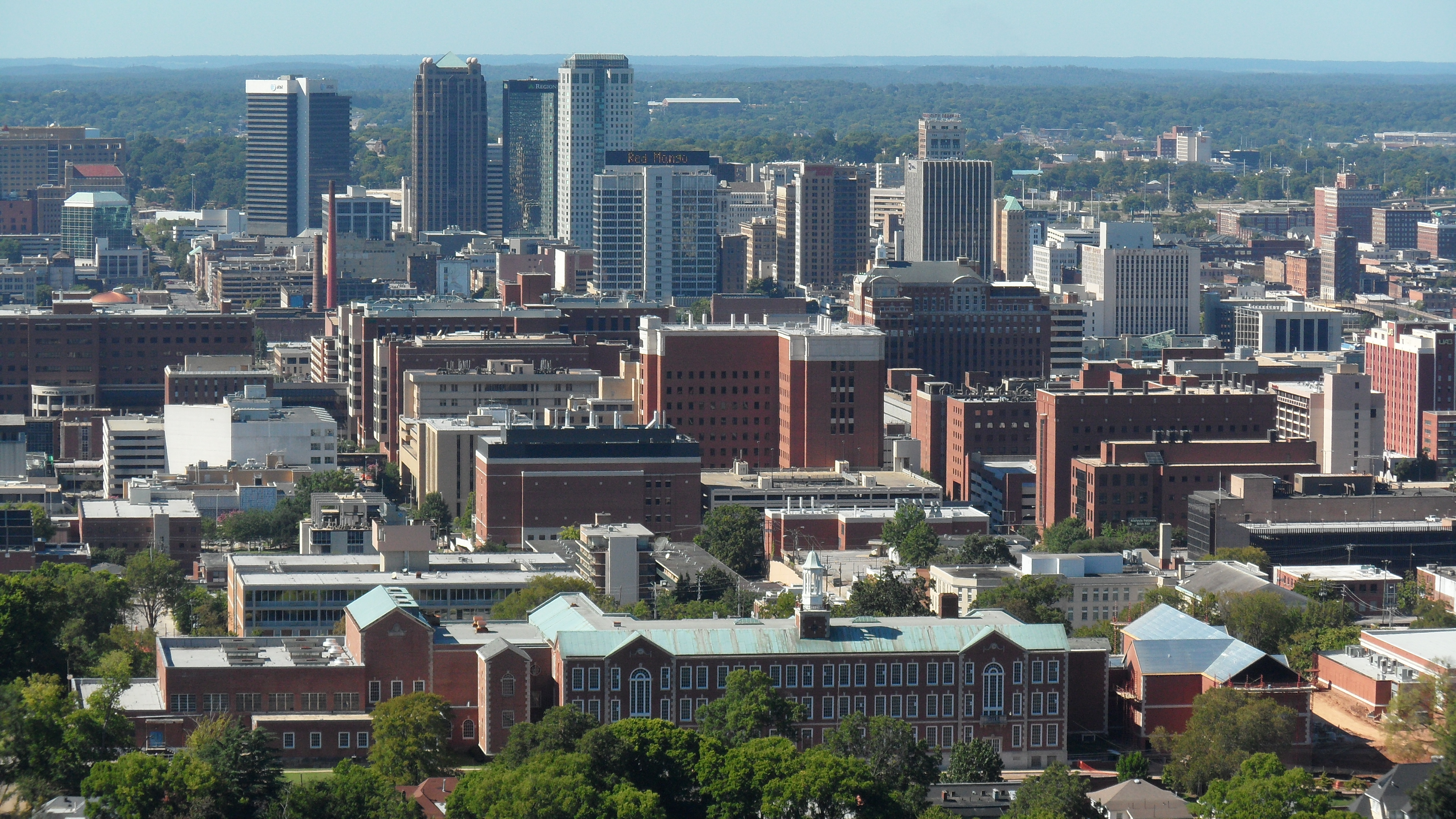
- Pictures top to bottom: (1) Raleigh (2) Charlotte (3) Greenville (4) Atlanta (5) Birmingham
- Nickname: Charlanta
Interactive Map of the Piedmont Atlantic megaregion
Atlanta–Sandy Springs–Roswell, GA MSA
Athens-Clarke County, GA MSA
Macon-Bibb County–Warner Robins, GA CSA
Columbus–Auburn–Opelika, GA–AL CSA
Chattanooga–Cleveland–Dalton, TN–GA–AL CSA
Greenville–Spartanburg–Anderson, SC CSA
Charlotte–Concord–Gastonia, NC–SC CSA
Hickory–Lenoir–Morganton, NC MSA
Asheville–Waynesville–Brevard, NC CSA
Greensboro–Winston-Salem–High Point, NC CSA and North Wilkesboro, NC μSA
Raleigh–Durham–Chapel Hill, NC CSA
Fayetteville–Lumberton–Pinehurst, NC CSA
Rocky Mount–Wilson–Roanoke Rapids, NC CSA and Goldsboro, NC MSA
Birmingham–Cullman–Talladega, AL CSA
Huntsville–Decatur–Albertville, AL–TN CSA
Tuscaloosa, AL MSA
Florence–Muscle Shoals, AL MSA
Anniston–Oxford, AL MSA and Gadsden, AL MSA
Non-metropolitan counties in the megaregion

Area
  - Land: 85,500 sq mi (221,500 km^{2})

Population (2024)
  - Metro: 30,597,000

GDP
  - Total: $1.243 trillion (2022)
  - Per capita: $46,148 (2022)
- Time zones: UTC−5 (EST)
  - Summer (DST): UTC−4 (EDT)
- UTC−6 (CST)
  - Summer (DST): UTC−5 (CDT)

The Piedmont Atlantic megaregion (PAM) or Southeast Megalopolis, is a neologism created by the Regional Plan Association for an area of the Southeastern United States that contains parts of the states of Alabama, Georgia, Tennessee, South Carolina, and North Carolina. The region includes the Atlanta, Birmingham, Charlotte, Nashville, Raleigh–Durham, Greenville–Spartanburg and Greensboro–Winston-Salem metropolitan areas. The megaregion generally follows the Interstate 85/20 corridor. According to Georgia Tech, the Piedmont Atlantic represents over 12 percent of the total United States population and covers over 243,000 square miles (630,000 km^{2}) of land.

The Piedmont Atlantic megaregion is just one emergent megalopolis (also known as a megaregion) of eleven such regions in the continental United States. Half of the nation's population growth and two-thirds of its economic growth are expected to occur within those regions over the next four decades.

== Terminology ==
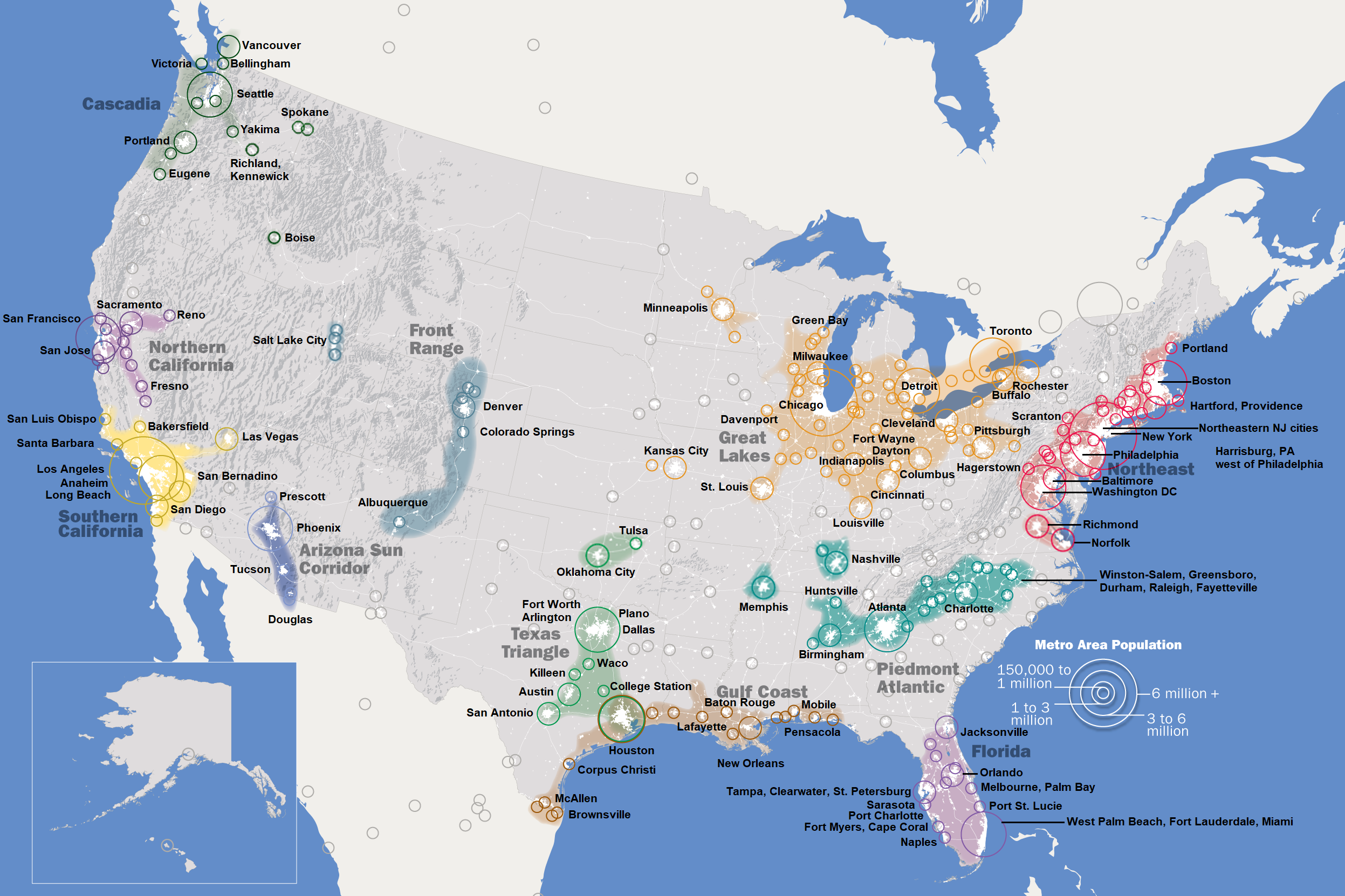
US map showing the 11 emerging megaregions, with the Piedmont Atlantic shown in green, located between the Great Lakes and Florida megaregions

Studies by Virginia Tech and Georgia Tech identify the 85/20 corridor in the Southeastern United States area as an "emergent" megalopolis including the primary cities of Atlanta, Birmingham, Greenville, Spartanburg, Charlotte, Winston-Salem, Greensboro, Durham, and Raleigh with Atlanta being the largest metropolitan area and Charlotte being the largest city. Both studies refer to the area as the Piedmont megalopolis. The region is also referred to as the Piedmont Atlantic Megaregion or PAM.

== Region ==
The Georgia Tech survey defines the region narrowly, focusing on the urban and suburban counties between Birmingham and Raleigh, and the rural counties that explicitly link those urban and suburban counties.

The Virginia Tech study proposes a broader definition, which would also include Columbus, Macon, Huntsville, Augusta, Columbia, Knoxville, Chattanooga, the Tri-Cities, Asheville and a number of smaller cities. The western extent of this definition is deeply disconnected from the remainder of the region by the Appalachian Mountains range, and is economically not well-integrated into the greater region. Other locales mentioned in the Virginia Tech study remain disconnected from the region's core, separated by dozens of miles of deeply rural areas.

Both reports highlight the "emergent" nature of this possible megalopolis, noting comparatively low urban densities, but also noting a pattern in growth (in the individual, component urban areas) towards each other. As of 2005, this region (as defined in the Virginia Tech study) has a population of 19 million.

The Piedmont Atlantic central Metropolitan Areas are located on the southern Piedmont region which gives the megaregion its name. The Piedmont is located between the Appalachian Mountains and the Atlantic coastal plain. The surface relief of the Piedmont is characterized by relatively low, rolling hills with heights above sea level between 200 feet (50 m) and 800 feet to (rarely) 1,000 feet (250 m to 300 m).

The region has a diverse economy ranging in many different industries. Henry W. Grady of the Atlanta Journal-Constitution coined the term New South to describe the American South, in whole or in part. The term "New South" is used in contrast to the Old South's plantation system of the antebellum period, to a new Industrial region. Since then Atlanta has grown from a small railway town into a major business, convention and transportation hub. Atlanta is now considered an "Alpha-World City" according to GaWC 2010 at Loughborough University by the Globalization and World Cities Study Group & Network. Charlotte in the Piedmont Crescent has grown to become a major U.S. financial center, and the nation's 2nd largest financial center. Birmingham boomed after the Civil War as a major industrial center in the Southern United States, the city's economy has diversified into banking, insurance, medicine, publishing, and biotechnology. The region of Raleigh, Durham, and Chapel Hill is known as the Research Triangle, named for the Research Triangle Park, which is the largest research park in the United States and one of its most prominent high-tech research and development centers. Huntsville is known for its large NASA presence and for its large aerospace industry as well as the Cummings Research Park, which is the second largest research park in the United States. Huntsville also is home to several factories for foreign automakers such as Mazda and Toyota and the headquarters of several small tech companies such as Adtran. Upstate South Carolina, a region including Greenville, Spartanburg and Anderson has been given foreign investment and has become the fastest growing region in the U.S. state of South Carolina.

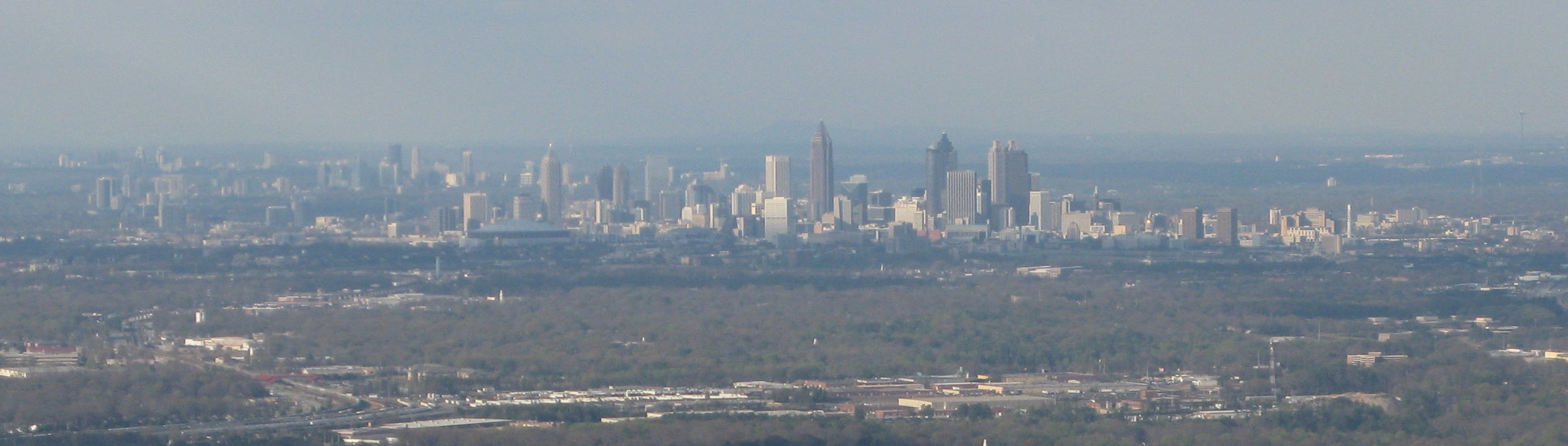
A 2008 aerial photo of Atlanta's urban core viewed from the Southwest near Hartsfield-Jackson Atlanta International Airport. Downtown Atlanta (in the foreground) is followed by Midtown, and then Buckhead. Sandy Springs and Dunwoody's Perimeter Center skyline is visible in the background. In 2013, the entire Atlanta metro had a population of 6,162,195. It is the largest metro area within the Piedmont Atlantic megaregion.

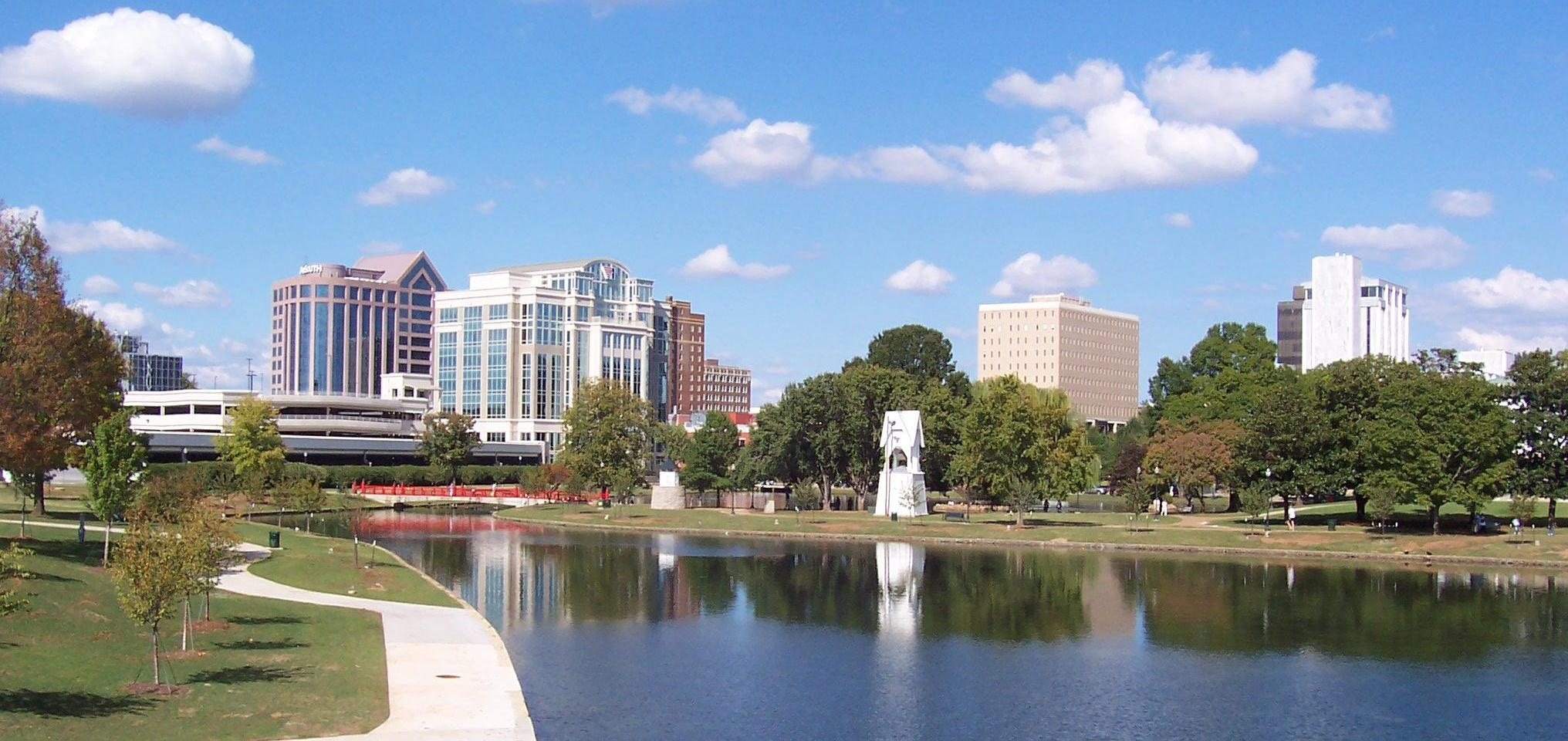
Downtown Huntsville, Alabama

== Population ==
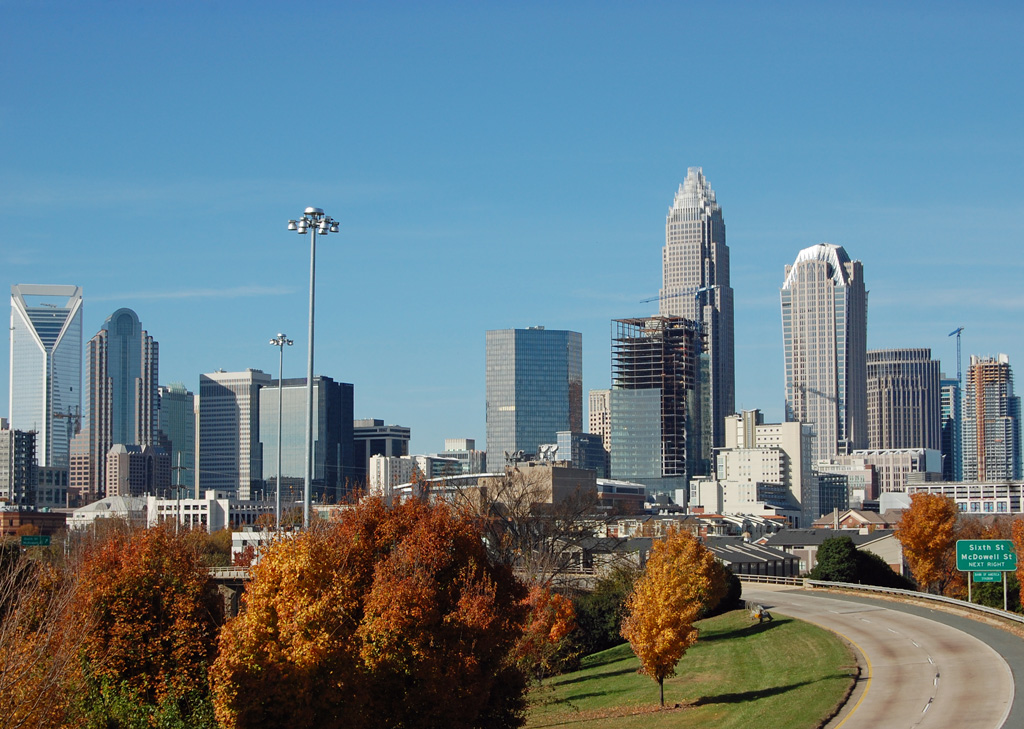
Charlotte is the largest city in the region with a 2017 population of 859,035

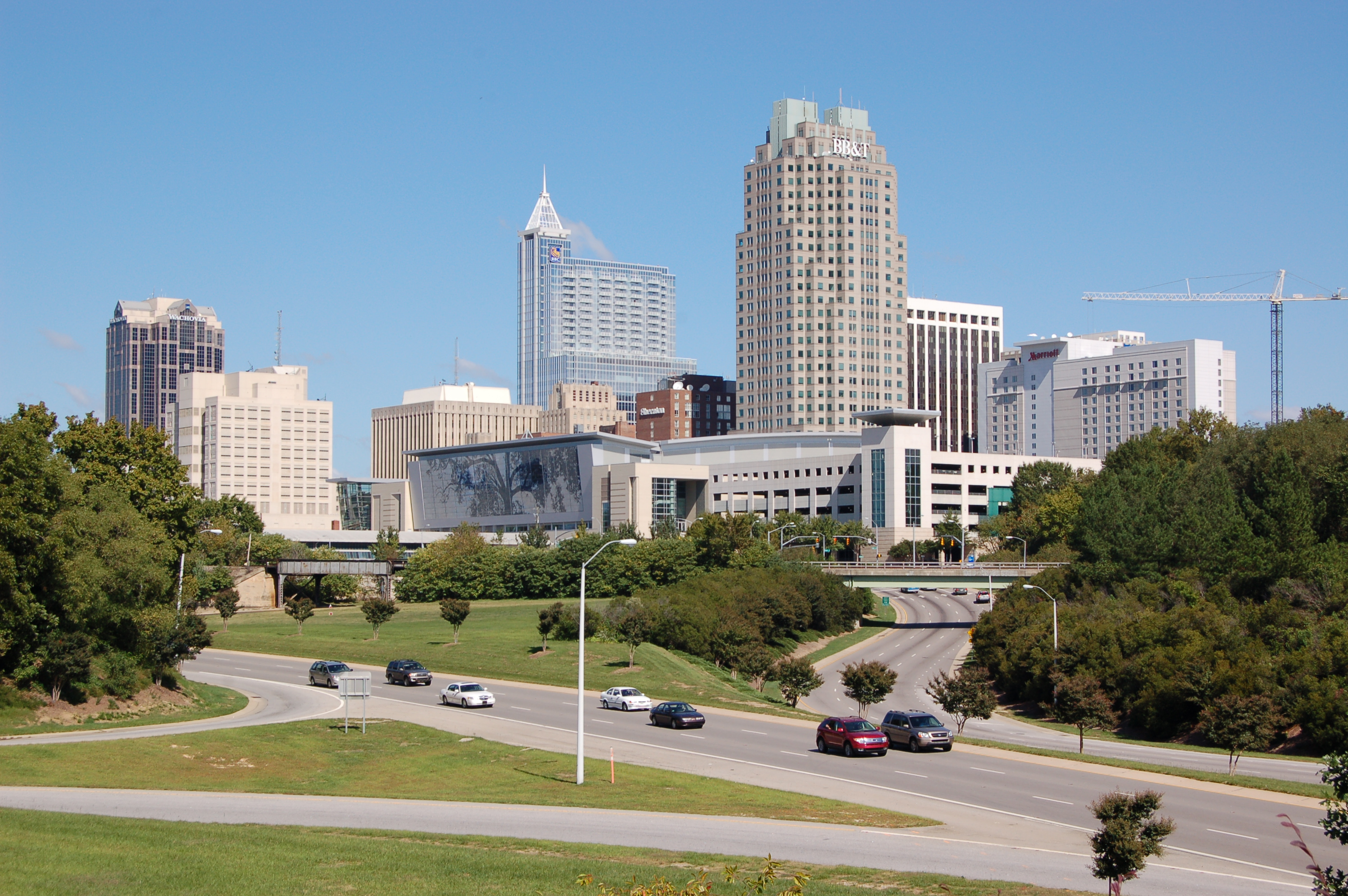
Raleigh had a 2013 metro population of 1,214,516 and is considered one of the fastest growing areas in the United States

Combined statistical areas (CSAs) within the Piedmont Atlantic megalopolis

Rank	Combined statistical area	Anchor city(s)	State(s)	Population (2024)
1	Atlanta–Athens-Clarke County–Sandy Springs	Atlanta	GA, AL	7,340,522
2	Charlotte–Concord–Gastonia	Charlotte	NC / SC	3,471,190
3	Raleigh–Durham–Chapel Hill	Raleigh, Durham	NC	2,439,501
4	Nashville-Davidson–Murfreesboro	Nashville	TN	2,402,290
5	Greensboro–Winston-Salem–High Point	Greensboro and Winston-Salem	NC	1,760,496
6	Greenville–Spartanburg–Anderson	Greenville	SC	1,627,507
7	Memphis–Forrest City	Memphis	TN / MS / AR	1,381,272
8	Birmingham–Hoover–Talladega	Birmingham	AL	1,376,853
9	Knoxville–Morristown–Sevierville	Knoxville	TN	1,222,320
10	Columbia–Orangeburg–Newberry	Columbia	SC	1,097,300
11	Chattanooga–Cleveland–Dalton	Chattanooga	TN / GA / AL	1,016,333
12	Huntsville–Decatur–Albertville	Huntsville	AL	913,977
13	Charleston-North Charleston	Charleston	SC	869,940
14	Fayetteville–Lumberton–Laurinburg	Fayetteville	NC	696,741
15	Augusta-Richmond County-Martinez	Augusta	GA	636,670
16	Johnson City–Kingsport–Bristol	Johnson City, Kingsport	TN / VA	602,222
17	Columbus–Auburn–Opelika	Columbus, Auburn	GA / AL	571,048
18	Asheville–Brevard	Asheville	NC	519,484
19	Macon-Warner Robins-Fort Valley	Macon, Warner Robins	GA	441,727
20	Rocky Mount-Wilson-Roanoke Rapids	Rocky Mount, Wilson	NC	290,664
21	Tuscaloosa-Northport	Tuscaloosa	AL	281,963
22	Florence	Florence	SC	200,474
23	Florence-Muscle Shoals-Russellville	Florence	AL	188,161
24	Jackson metropolitan area, Tennessee	Jackson	TN	183,680
25	Tupelo-Corinth	Tupelo	MS	132,699
26	Starkville-Columbus	Starkville	MS	129,039
Total	31,431,053			

== Transportation ==
Interstate I-85, I-20 and I-40 are the main corridors, and the major Interstates which are intersected are the I-59, I-95, I-73, I-74, I-77, I-26, I-75 and I-65. The gateway cities of Savannah, Charleston, and Wilmington all serve as seaports for the Piedmont Atlantic Region. Within the Piedmont Atlantic megaregion there are six international airports, nine when including those located in the aforementioned gateway cities.

Hartsfield-Jackson Atlanta International Airport is the busiest airport in the region and in the world. Charlotte/Douglas International Airport is the second busiest airport in the region and the 17th busiest airport in the world. In addition to Charlotte and Atlanta, other airports in the region with direct, non-stop airline service outside North America include: Raleigh-Durham International Airport, Charleston International Airport, and Nashville International Airport. Other major airports in the region include: Piedmont Triad International Airport, Asheville Regional Airport, Wilmington International Airport, Birmingham-Shuttlesworth International Airport, Huntsville International Airport, Greenville-Spartanburg International Airport, Myrtle Beach International Airport, Columbia Metropolitan Airport, Hilton Head Airport, McGhee Tyson Airport, and Memphis International Airport, which is the world's busiest airport by most cargo traffic by weight annually.

== Megaregion as a unit ==
The Piedmont Atlantic is the fastest growing megaregion in the United States. The megaregion is facing challenges with its growing population, increased traffic congestion, and inadequate infrastructure. Mayors, businesses, and academic professionals have organized the Piedmont Alliance for Quality Growth to help address these problems with sustainable solutions. With the goal of focusing on the growth of the megaregion, they have called for less competition between cities and metropolitan areas in the same region, and a stronger and more cohesive ability to work together to compete on the global scale. The major issues facing the Piedmont Atlantic megaregion include conflicts over shared natural resources such as water and problems of transportation infrastructure such as upkeep of roads and railways linking cities. Many of the issues cities or metropolitan areas face cannot be solved by action on a local scale. A megaregion as a unit working together is an advantage in economics and quality of life within the region.

== Culture ==
The culture of the Piedmont Atlantic megaregion is a subset of the culture of the greater Southern United States. It is mainly a combination of the cultures of Georgia and North Carolina, as these two states have the greatest populations by far of the five states that make up the region, and contain most of the region's major cities.

=== Sports ===
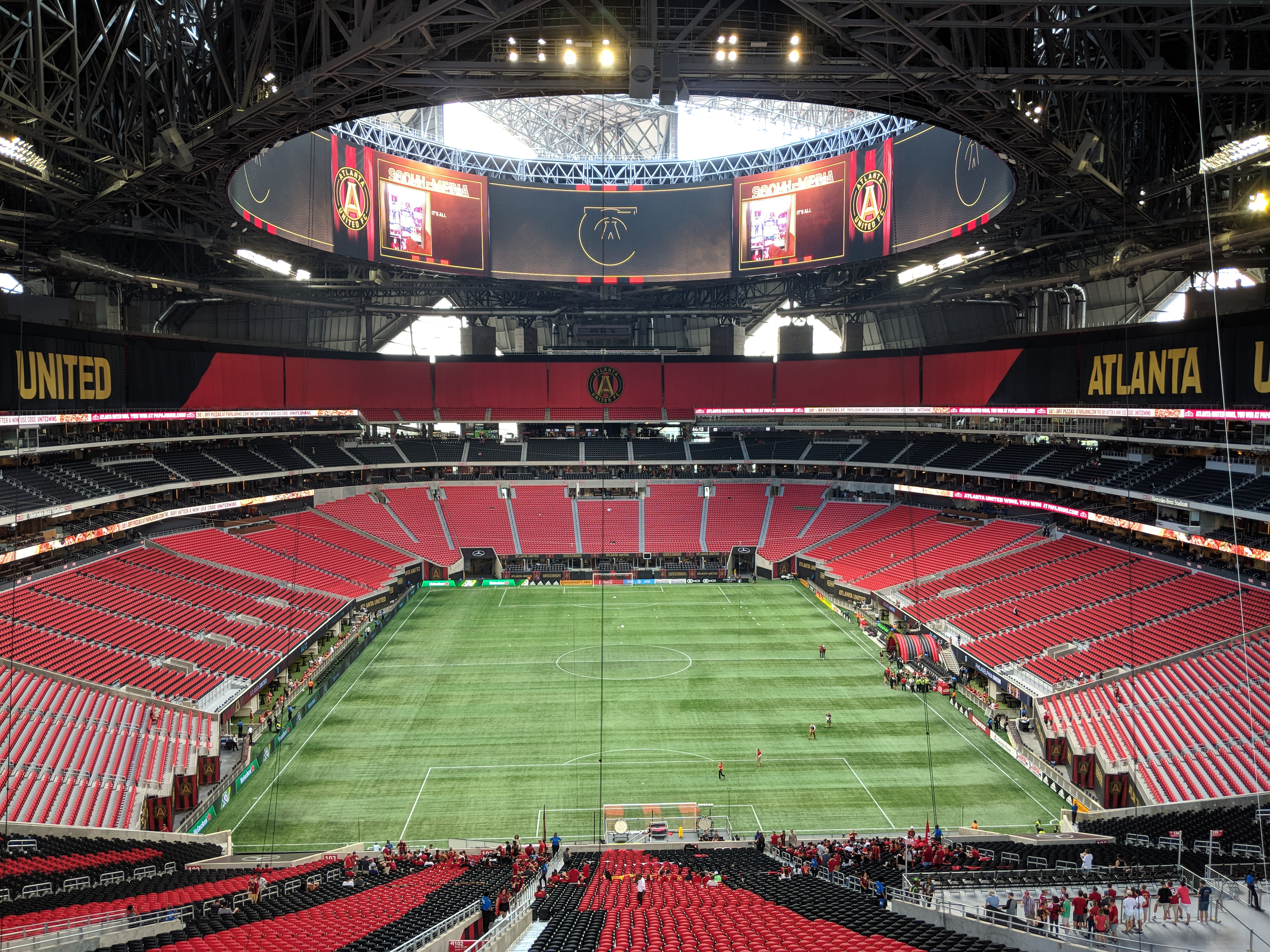
Mercedes-Benz Stadium

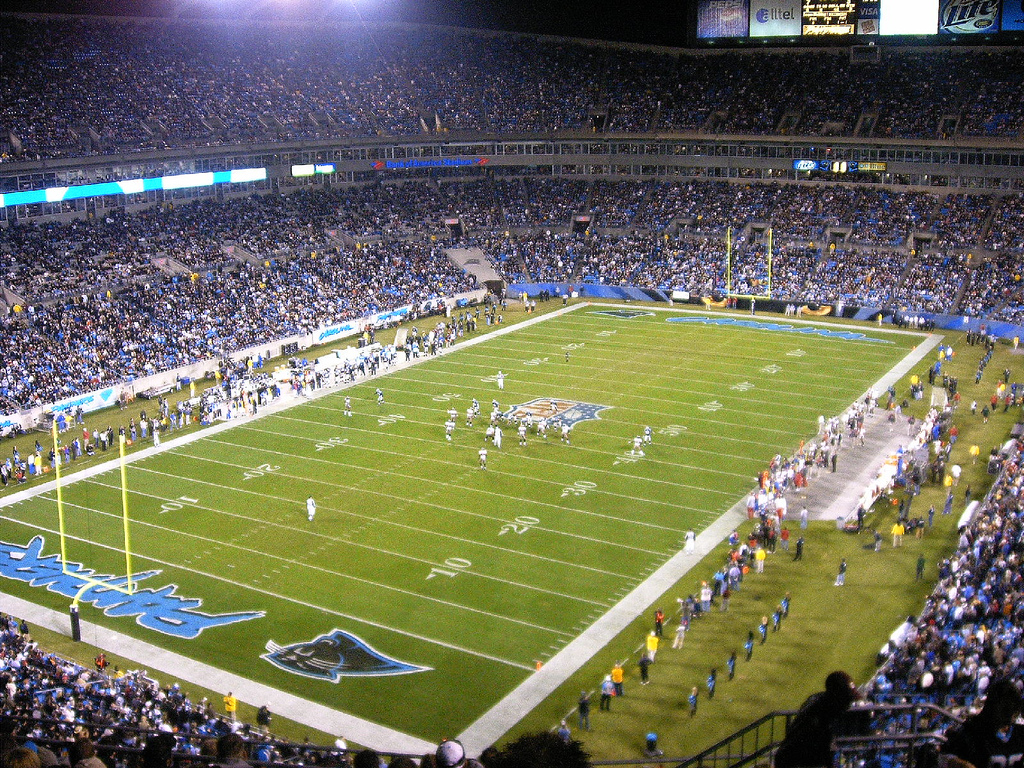
Bank of America Stadium

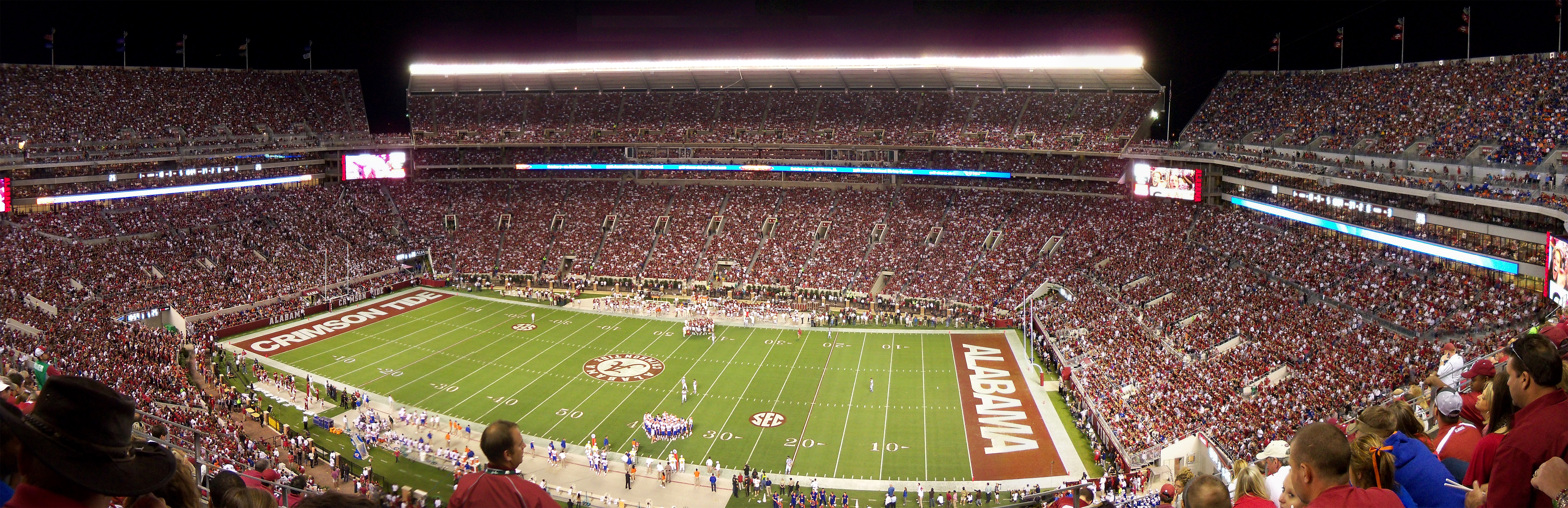
Bryant–Denny Stadium

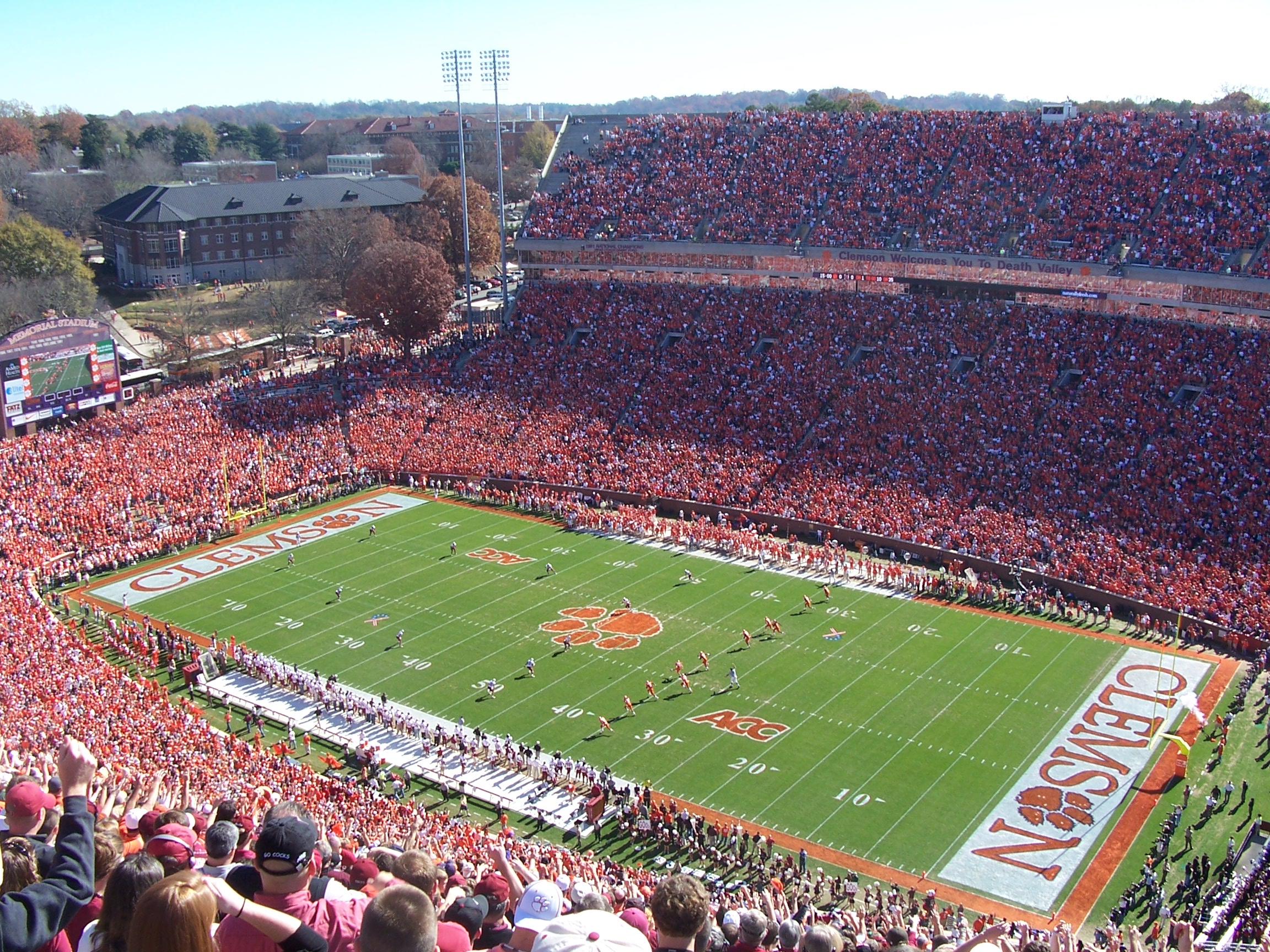
Clemson Memorial Stadium

Professional sports teams in the region include:

- Atlanta Braves (Major League Baseball)
- Atlanta Dream (Women's National Basketball Association)
- Atlanta Falcons (National Football League)
- Atlanta Hawks (National Basketball Association)
- Atlanta United FC (Major League Soccer)
- Birmingham Barons (Minor League Baseball)
- Charlotte FC (Major League Soccer)
- Carolina Hurricanes (National Hockey League)
- Carolina Panthers (National Football League)
- Charlotte Hornets (National Basketball Association)
- Charlotte Knights (Minor League Baseball)
- Durham Bulls (Minor League Baseball)
- Gwinnett Stripers (Minor League Baseball)
- Memphis Grizzlies (National Basketball Association)
- Nashville Predators (National Hockey League)
- Nashville Sounds (Minor League Baseball)
- North Carolina Courage (National Women's Soccer League)
- Rocket City Trash Pandas (Minor League Baseball)
- Tennessee Titans (National Football League)

College athletics teams in the so-called Power Four conferences include:

- Alabama Crimson Tide (Southeastern Conference)
- Auburn Tigers (Southeastern Conference)
- Clemson Tigers (Atlantic Coast Conference)
- Duke Blue Devils (Atlantic Coast Conference)
- Georgia Bulldogs (Southeastern Conference)
- Georgia Tech Yellow Jackets (Atlantic Coast Conference)
- NC State Wolfpack (Atlantic Coast Conference)
- North Carolina Tar Heels (Atlantic Coast Conference)
- South Carolina Gamecocks (Southeastern Conference)
- Tennessee Volunteers (Southeastern Conference)
- Vanderbilt Commodores (Southeastern Conference)
- Wake Forest Demon Deacons (Atlantic Coast Conference)

Notable sports competitions include:

- 1996 Summer Olympics
- 2022 World Games
- Barbasol Championship
- Masters Tournament
- St. Jude Classic
- The Tradition
- Wells Fargo Championship
- Wyndham Championship
- U.S. National Indoor Tennis Championships

Notable motorsport racetracks include:

- Atlanta Motor Speedway
- Barber Motorsports Park
- Bristol Motor Speedway
- Charlotte Motor Speedway
- Darlington Raceway
- Nashville Superspeedway
- North Wilkesboro Speedway
- Road Atlanta
- Talladega Superspeedway

=== Attractions ===
Charlotte hosts the NASCAR Hall of Fame, Charlotte Motor Speedway, Daniel Stowe Botanical Garden, Discovery Place, Bechtler Museum of Modern Art, Uptown Mint Museum, Carowinds Amusement Park, Bank of America Headquarters, U.S. National Whitewater Center, and the Billy Graham Library. The nearby North Carolina Zoological Park is located in Asheboro in Randolph County, North Carolina in the Uwharrie Mountains and Uwharrie National Forest. At over 500 acres (200 ha), it is the largest walk-through zoo in the world. Crowders Mountain State Park in Gastonia provides hiking and rock climbing opportunities.

Atlanta hosts 37 million tourists every year. Attractions include the Atlanta Motor Speedway, Centennial Olympic Park, CNN Center, Georgia Aquarium, Martin Luther King Jr. National Historic Park, Road Atlanta, Six Flags Over Georgia, Stone Mountain Park, and World of Coca-Cola.

Chattanooga hosts the Tennessee Aquarium, and the Lookout Mountain Incline Railway.

Birmingham, at the southern end of the Piedmont Atlantic megaregion, is home to several museums; the largest is the Birmingham Museum of Art, which is also the largest municipal art museum in the Southeast. The area's history museums include Birmingham Civil Rights Institute, which houses a detailed and emotionally charged narrative exhibit putting Birmingham's history into the context of the Civil Rights Movement located at the Birmingham Civil Rights National Monument, Birmingham Civil Rights District. The Sloss Furnaces National Historic Landmark and the Vulcan statue and museum that overlooks the city and provides views from atop Red Mountain details the industrial history of the area. Other Birmingham area attractions include Alabama Adventure Amusement Park, McWane Science Center, Red Mountain Park, Birmingham Botanical Gardens (United States), and the Alabama Sports Hall of Fame. The Birmingham area also includes two prominent race tracks, Talladega Superspeedway and Barber Motorsports Park and museum, which features over 1400 motorcycles and race cars and is the largest collection of motorcycles in the world. Greenville, South Carolina, offers Falls Park on the Reedy, a 32-acre (130,000 m2) park adjacent to downtown in the historic West End district.

The Appalachian mountains provide many outdoor opportunities, including hiking, road and mountain biking, driving and motorcycling, rafting, and kayaking. Major attractions in the region are the area around Asheville, Great Smoky Mountains National Park (the US's most visited National Park), the Blue Ridge Parkway (the US's other most visited park), Mt Mitchell (the highest mountain in the eastern US), the Appalachian Trail, the Chatooga Wild and Scenic River, the Jocassee Gorges, Grandfather Mountain, the Ocoee River, the Tail of the Dragon, and Pisgah National Forest.

The region also has multiple major national and state parks. These include:

- The Blue Ridge Parkway (NC & VA)
- Great Smoky Mountains National Park (NC & TN)
- Mt Michell State Park (NC)
- Chimney Rock State Park (NC)
- Grandfather Mountain State Park (NC)
- Gorges State Park (NC)
- Hanging Rock State Park (NC)
- Crowders Mountain State Park (NC)
- King's Mountain National Military Park (SC)
- Table Rock State Park (SC)
- Ceaser's Head and Jones Gap State Parks (SC)
- Mountain Bridge Wilderness Area (SC)
- Chattahoochee–Oconee National Forest (GA)
- Tallulah Gorge State Park (GA)
- Lookout Mountain (TN & GA)
- Lake Guntersville State Park (AL)
- Joe Wheeler State Park (AL)

== Education ==
The area is home to a number of colleges and universities, including:

- Agnes Scott College
- Alabama A & M University
- Alabama State University
- Albany State University
- Anderson University
- Appalachian State University
- Auburn University
- Augusta University
- Austin Peay State University
- Belmont University
- Belmont Abbey College
- Bevill State Community College
- Birmingham Southern College
- Bob Jones University
- Brevard College
- Carson-Newman University
- Catawba College
- Central Piedmont Community College
- Charlotte School of Law
- Christian Brothers University
- Clark Atlanta University
- Clayton State University
- Clemson University
- Columbus State University
- Converse College
- Cumberland University
- Davidson College
- Duke University
- East Tennessee State University
- Elon University
- Emory University
- Fisk University
- Fort Valley State University
- Furman University
- Gardner–Webb University
- Georgia Gwinnett College
- Georgia State University
- Georgia Tech
- Gordon State College
- Greensboro College
- Greenville Technical College
- Guilford College
- High Point University
- Jacksonville State University
- Johnson C. Smith University
- Johnson & Wales University
- Kennesaw State University
- LaGrange College
- Lenoir-Rhyne University
- Limestone College
- Lipscomb University
- Livingstone College
- Louisburg College
- Meharry Medical College
- Meredith College
- Middle Tennessee State University
- Morehouse College
- North Carolina A&T State University
- North Carolina Central University
- North Carolina State University
- North Greenville University
- Oakwood University
- Oglethorpe University
- Paine College
- Peace College
- Pfeiffer University
- Presbyterian College
- Piedmont University
- Queens University of Charlotte
- Rhodes College
- Saint Augustine's College
- Salem College
- Samford University
- Savannah College of Art and Design
- Shaw University
- Southcentral Kentucky Community and Technical College
- Southern Wesleyan University
- Spartanburg Community College
- Spelman College
- Tennessee State University
- Tennessee Technological University
- Trevecca Nazarene University
- Tuskegee University
- University of Alabama
- University of Alabama at Birmingham
- University of Alabama in Huntsville
- University of Georgia
- University of Memphis
- University of Montevallo
- University of North Carolina at Asheville
- University of North Carolina at Chapel Hill
- University of North Carolina at Charlotte
- University of North Carolina at Greensboro
- University of North Carolina at Wilmington
- University of North Carolina School of the Arts
- University of North Georgia
- University of South Carolina Aiken
- University of South Carolina Columbia
- University of South Carolina Upstate
- University of Tennessee, Knoxville
- University of West Georgia
- Vanderbilt University
- Wake Forest University
- Western Kentucky University
- Wilkes Community College
- Winston-Salem State University
- Wingate University
- Winthrop University
- Wofford College

== See also ==
- I-85 Corridor
- Charlanta
- Conurbation
- Megalopolis (city type)
- Megaregions of the United States
- Piedmont Crescent
