= Charlanta =

Charlanta Megaregion
- Megaregion of the United States
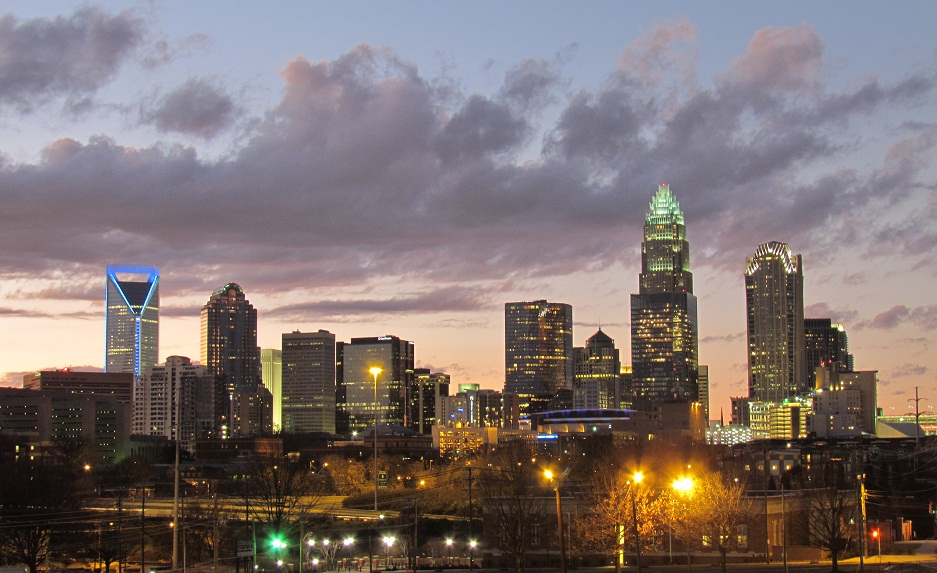
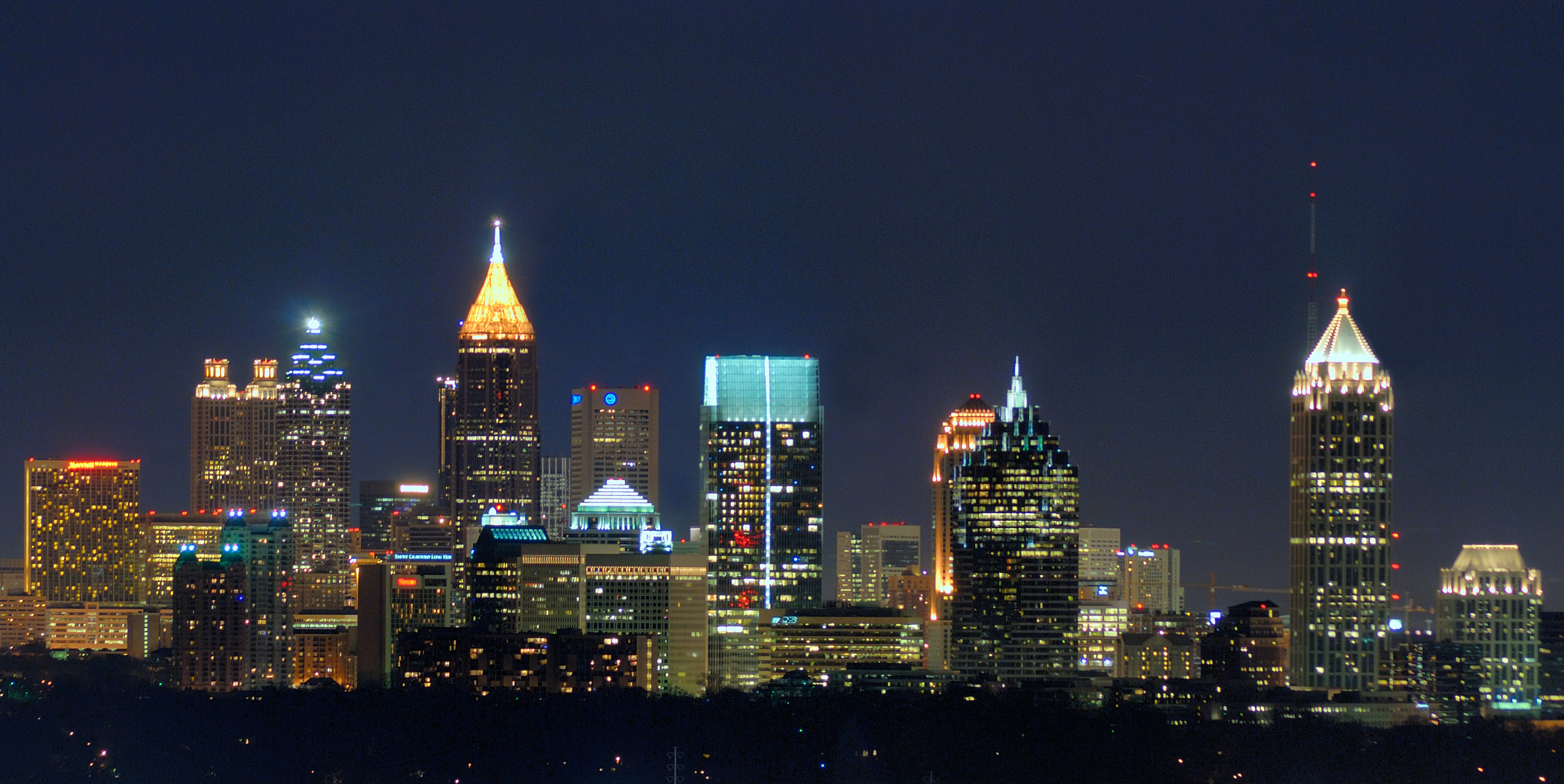
- Charlotte (top) and Atlanta (bottom)
- Country: United States
- State(s): Georgia; North Carolina; South Carolina
- Major Cities: Atlanta; Charlotte; Greenville

Population
  - Total: 22,000,000

Charlanta is one of the Megaregions of the United States, and is part of the Piedmont Atlantic Megaregion. Extending along the I-85 Corridor, the region stretches from Charlotte to Atlanta. With more than $1 trillion in economic output, it is considered one of the 12 regional powerhouses that drive the economy of the United States. Based on projections, this region's urban areas will "expand 165%, from 17,800 km^{2} in 2009 to 47,500 km^{2} in 2060," ultimately connecting the urban sprawl of Atlanta and Charlotte. Researchers have expressed concern that this urban development will create a warmer climate along the corridor and increase flood risks in the region.

Rank	Primary statistical area	Anchor city	Population (2020 Census)	State(s)
1	Atlanta–Athens-Clarke County–Sandy Springs	Atlanta	6,930,423	GA
2	Charlotte–Concord–Gastonia	Charlotte	2,846,550	NC / SC
3	Greenville–Spartanburg–Anderson	Greenville	1,487,610	SC
