= Culture of North Carolina =

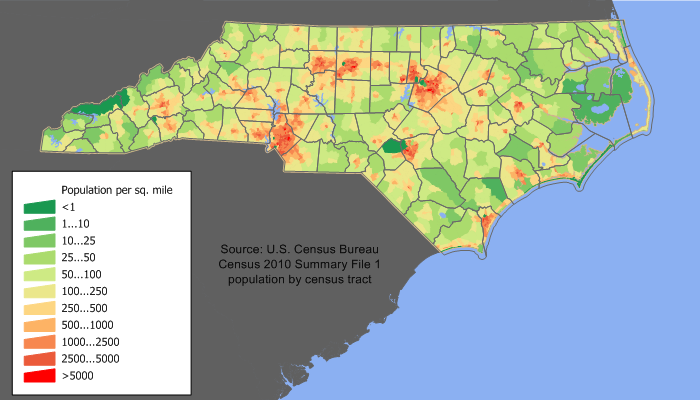
North Carolina Population Density Map (2010)

The Culture of North Carolina is a subculture in the United States. As one of the original Thirteen Colonies, North Carolina culture has been greatly influenced by early settlers of English, Scot-Irish, Scot, German, and Swiss descent. Likewise, African Americans have had great cultural influence in North Carolina, first coming as enslaved people during colonial times. From slavery to freedom, they have helped shape things such as literary traditions, religious practices, cuisine, music, and popular culture.

In recent years, North Carolina has seen an influx of people from areas such as New York, Florida, Virginia, South Carolina, and California; as well as an increase in Hispanic, East Asian and Indian immigrants. Many of these U.S. migrants and immigrants from abroad, usually aggregate in one of several urban centers across the Piedmont region. In rural North Carolina, agriculture, small businesses, local venues, and annual festivals help play a major component of the economy. As a whole, the state has formed varied cultures of music, arts, and cuisine among others.

== Urban culture ==
Due to the presence of several dense urban centers in North Carolina, many cities and metropolitan areas have very distinctive cultures, with most having a melting pot of cultures and ethnicities. The Research Triangle Park, also known as The Triangle, is chiefly composed of Raleigh, Durham, and Chapel Hill. It also includes several other neighboring towns such as Cary, Carrboro, Morrisville and Apex. The Triangle serves as an anchor for many large businesses in the area, which has the effect of attracting many secondary and supporting businesses. This, along with the many colleges in the Triangle, has created a high concentration of educated and affluent homes in and around the area. A growing population has also created a demand for independent, unique, high quality restaurants and night life, as well as a high demand for craft breweries.

There is substantial demand for urban amenities and entertainment to match the state's growing urban metropolitan population. This demand has led to construction and development of new amenities in areas such as The Triangle and Charlotte metro for several decades. These construction projects include planned subdivisions, restaurants, strip malls, highway expansions, new schools, and business parks.

== Rural culture ==
While there are several urban centers across the state, much of North Carolina is also rural. Dense forests cover much of the mountainous region of Western North Carolina, while Eastern North Carolina has many areas of large farmland used for agricultural purposes. Rural North Carolina tends to lean towards traditional Southern culture. Common recreational activities in rural North Carolina include horseback riding, hiking, swimming in rivers and lakes, fishing, target shooting and hunting, riding trails on ATVs/modified trucks (also called off-roading), and extensive gardening (many families operate small-scale farms).

== Food ==
A nationally famous food from North Carolina is pork barbecue and bacon. In Eastern North Carolina, pork barbecue uses a vinegar-based sauce and the "whole hog" is cooked, using both white and dark meat. While there is not one town in Eastern North Carolina that can claim to be the indisputable "capital" of Eastern Carolina barbecue, the medium-sized cities of Greenville and Goldsboro, and their surrounding communities boast the highest concentrations of highly ranked establishments. The annual Newport Pig Pickin' (the largest whole pig cooking contest in North Carolina) is held featuring primarily eastern-style barbecue.

Central and Western North Carolina pork barbecue uses a tomato and vinegar based sauce, and only the pork shoulder (dark meat) is used. The "capital" of Central and Western Carolina barbecue is the Piedmont Triad town of Lexington, home of the Lexington Barbecue Festival, which brings in over 100,000 visitors each October.

== Arts ==
=== Music ===
North Carolina is known particularly for its history of old-time music. Many recordings were made in the early 20th century by folk song collector Bascom Lamar Lunsford. Influential North Carolina country musicians like the North Carolina Ramblers and Al Hopkins helped solidify the sound of country music in the late 1920s. Other influential bluegrass musicians such as Earl Scruggs, Doc Watson and Del McCoury are also from North Carolina. Arthur Smith is a notable North Carolina musician/entertainer who had the first nationally syndicated television program which featured country music. Smith composed "Guitar Boogie", the all-time best selling guitar instrumental, and "Dueling Banjos", the all-time best selling banjo composition. Country artist Eric Church from the Hickory area, has had multiple #1 albums on the Billboard 200, including Chief in 2011. Both North and South Carolina are a hotbed for traditional country blues, especially the style known as the Piedmont blues. Elizabeth Cotten, from Chapel Hill, was active in the American folk music revival.

Because of their proximity to universities, areas such as Raleigh-Durham-Chapel Hill (collectively known as the Triangle), Asheville, Greensboro, Greenville, Charlotte, and Wilmington have long been a well-known center for indie rock, metal, punk, jazz, country, and hip-hop. Bands and groups from these popular music scenes include The Avett Brothers, Corrosion of Conformity, Superchunk, The Rosebuds, The Love Language, Troop 41, Ben Folds Five, Squirrel Nut Zippers, The Carolina Chocolate Drops, Lords of the Underground, Between the Buried and Me, and He Is Legend.

Notable rappers, producers, and people in hip-hop from North Carolina include: J. Cole, DaBaby, Petey Pablo, 9th Wonder, Phonte and Big Pooh of Little Brother, Rapsody, Mez, Lute, Ski Beatz, Deniro Farrar, and Cordae.

== Education ==
The University of North Carolina system encompasses 16 public universities including North Carolina A&T State University, North Carolina State University, North Carolina Central University, UNC-Pembroke, UNC-Chapel Hill, Elizabeth City State University, East Carolina University, Western Carolina University, Winston-Salem State University, UNC Charlotte, UNC Greensboro, Fayetteville State University and Appalachian State University. Along with its public universities, North Carolina has 58 public community colleges in its community college system. There are also a number of private colleges, for example Duke University in Durham, Wake Forest University in Winston-Salem, Campbell University in Buies Creek and Elon University, in Elon.

== Sports ==
North Carolina is home to professional-level sports teams, including basketball, football, soccer and hockey:

- NBA – Charlotte Hornets (formerly known as Charlotte Bobcats before restoring the original team name, based in Charlotte)
- NFL – Carolina Panthers (based in Charlotte)
- NHL – Carolina Hurricanes (based in Raleigh)
- MLS – Charlotte FC (based in Charlotte)

NASCAR racing is also a popular sport in North Carolina. NASCAR Cup Series races are frequently held at the Charlotte Motor Speedway in Concord, part of the Charlotte Metropolitan Area.

== Bibliography ==
- Federal Writers' Project (1939). North Carolina: A Guide to the Old North State. American Guide Series – via Internet Archive.
