= Falcons–Panthers rivalry =

National Football League rivalry

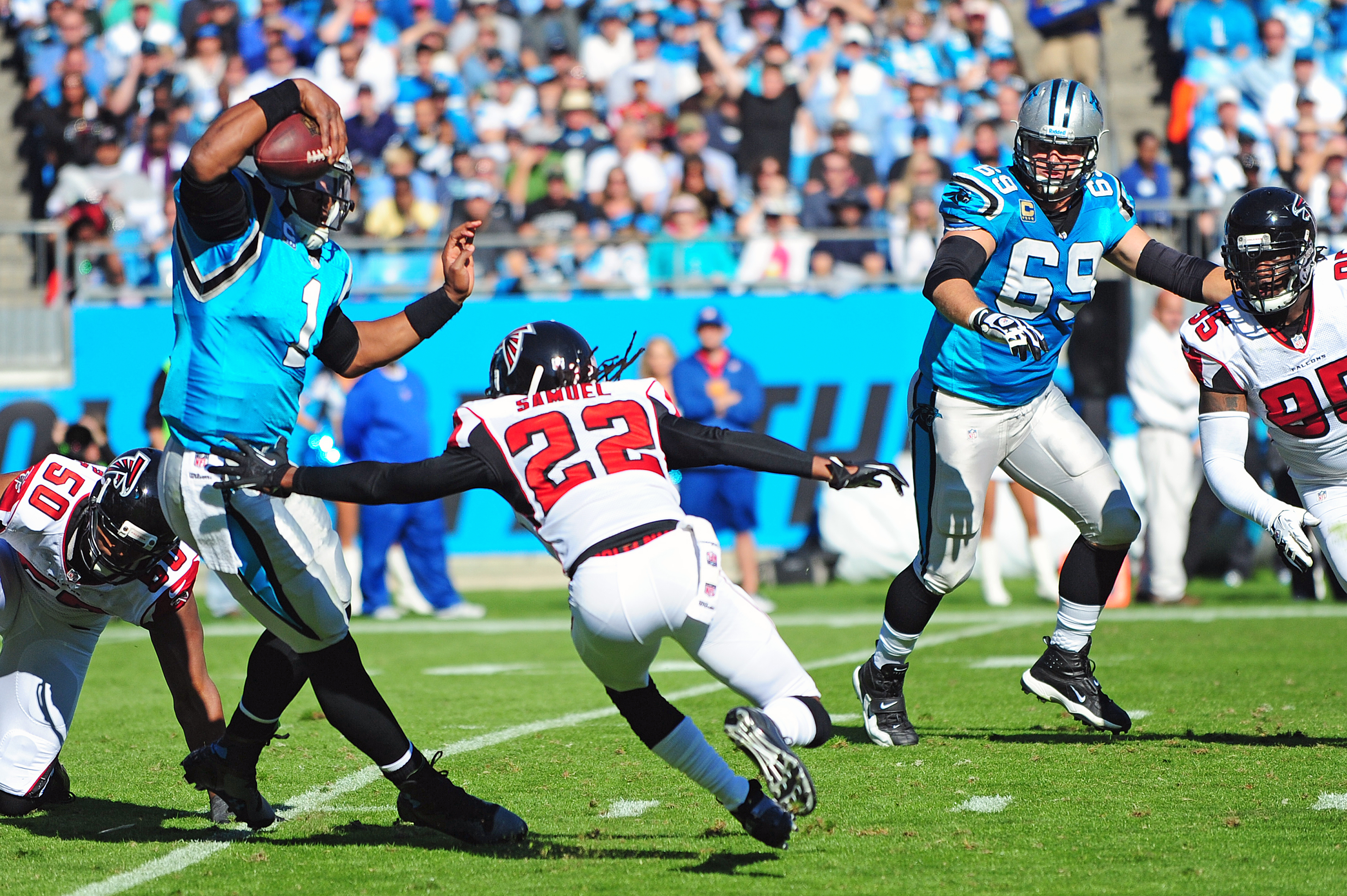
- Falcons and Panthers face off during the 2013 season.

- Atlanta Falcons Carolina Panthers
- Location: Atlanta, Charlotte
- First meeting: September 3, 1995; Falcons 23, Panthers 20 (OT)
- Latest meeting: September 20, 2026; Panthers 34, Falcons 3
- Next meeting: January 9/10, 2027
- Stadiums: Falcons: Mercedes-Benz Stadium; Panthers: Bank of America Stadium

Statistics
- Total meetings: 63
- All-time series: Falcons: 37–26
- Largest victory: Falcons: 41–0 (2002); Panthers: 38–0 (2015)
- Most points scored: Falcons: 51 (1998); Panthers: 44 (2005), (2024)
- Longest win streak: Falcons: 6 (2000–2002); Panthers: 4 (2024–present)
- Current win streak: Panthers: 4 (2024–present)
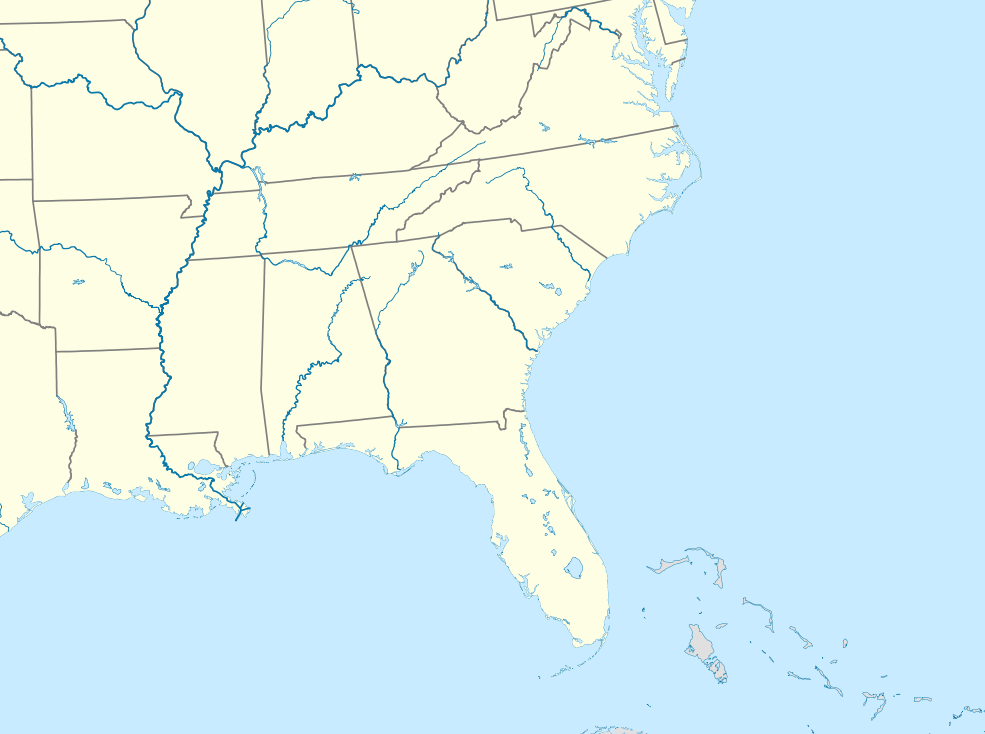

The Falcons–Panthers rivalry or I-85 rivalry is a National Football League (NFL) rivalry between the Atlanta Falcons and the Carolina Panthers.

The rivalry began in 1995 when the Panthers joined as an expansion team. The two teams have been in the same division since the Panthers joined the league, and thus play each other twice a year. For their first seven years, the Panthers were alongside the Falcons in the NFC West. In 2002, both teams would be put in the newly established NFC South.

It is known as the "I-85 rivalry" due to Atlanta and Charlotte being only four hours apart on Interstate 85. Games between the two teams feature large contingents of visiting fans in both cities.

The Falcons lead the overall series, 37–26. The two teams have not met in the playoffs.

== History ==
=== 1995–1999: Beginnings ===
Carolina's first ever regular season game was a tightly contested 23–20 overtime loss to the Falcons on September 3, 1995. This game was notable as NFL fans in the Carolinas who were formerly Falcons fans switched allegiance when the Panthers began play, filling up the Georgia Dome. The physical nature of the game contributed to an emotional experience for fans, setting the tone for the newly formed rivalry for years to come. As Falcons play-by-play announcer Wes Durham recalled, "I remember a lot of Panthers fans being there. I remember a lot of people from Charlotte, who had obviously driven down. And it was already being promoted as the 'I-85 Rivalry.' I remember that however they scored the touchdown towards the end of regulation it got loud. It was mostly Panthers fans." Later that season, Carolina defeated Atlanta 21–17 for their seventh win of the year–the most ever for an expansion franchise. Carolina faced Atlanta in the first regular season game played at Ericsson Stadium (now Bank of America Stadium) in 1996, which the Panthers won. Carolina won at home against the Falcons in each of its first three years as a franchise, carrying a 4–2 mark over Atlanta before the Falcons evened the series to 5–5 by the end of the 1990s.

=== 2000s ===
In 2002, the Falcons and Panthers were moved to the NFC South along with the Tampa Bay Buccaneers and New Orleans Saints, adding intensity to the rivalry. Coming off their Super Bowl appearance in 1998, the Falcons began dominating the Panthers during the early 2000s. By the end of the 2004 season, Atlanta had won 9 of 10 meetings in the decade, with Carolina's only win coming during the year of its Super Bowl appearance in 2003. A notable game occurred in 2004, when the Falcons came back to beat the Panthers with a Michael Vick rushing touchdown followed by an interception of Jake Delhomme by the Falcons defense to set up the game-winning field goal. By 2007, the Panthers made it more even, sweeping the Falcons for the first time since 1997 in 2005, but were still 2–6 at home against Atlanta. Overall, the Falcons won 13 of 20 games in the series during the 2000s.

=== 2010s ===
During the last week of the 2014 season, the Panthers and Falcons faced each other in a must-win game for the NFC South division title and playoff berth. Despite Atlanta winning earlier in the season, Carolina handily won this game 34–3, becoming just the second team in NFL history to clinch a division title with a losing record at 7–8–1.

In week 16 of the 2015 season, the Panthers came into Atlanta with a perfect 14–0 record as opposed to the Falcons' 7–7 record. Many anticipated the Falcons, who had started 6–1, but then went 1–7, would lose as they had two weeks earlier, when they lost 38–0. The Falcons, however, shocked the Panthers and beat them with a final score of 20–13.

== Season-by-season results ==
Atlanta Falcons vs. Carolina Panthers Season-by-Season Results
1990s (Tie, 5–5)

Season	Season series	at Atlanta Falcons	at Carolina Panthers	Overall series	Notes
1995	Tie 1–1	Falcons; 23–20 (OT)	Panthers; 21–17	Tie; 1–1	Panthers join the NFL as an expansion team and are placed in the NFC West along with the Falcons. The game in Atlanta was the Panthers' inaugural game as an NFL franchise.
1996	Tie 1–1	Falcons; 20–17	Panthers; 29–6	Tie; 2–2	Panthers open Ericsson Stadium (now known as Bank of America Stadium). Falcons get their first win of the season after a 0–8 start.
1997	Panthers 2–0	Panthers; 9–6	Panthers; 21–12	Panthers; 4–2	The game at Carolina was played on October 26, which was the same date that Atlanta Falcons founding owner Rankin Smith died.
1998	Falcons 2–0	Falcons; 51–23	Falcons; 19–14	Tie; 4–4	In Atlanta, the Falcons score their most points in a game against the Panthers. Falcons lose Super Bowl XXXIII.
1999	Tie 1–1	Falcons; 27–20	Panthers; 34–28	Tie; 5–5	

2000s (Falcons, 13–7)

Season	Season series	at Atlanta Falcons	at Carolina Panthers	Overall series	Notes
2000	Falcons 2–0	Falcons; 13–12	Falcons; 15–10	Falcons; 7–5	
2001	Falcons 2–0	Falcons; 24–16	Falcons; 10–7	Falcons; 9–5	
2002	Falcons 2–0	Falcons; 30–0	Falcons; 41–0	Falcons; 11–5	During the NFL realignment, both teams are moved to the newly created NFC South. In North Carolina, Falcons record their largest victory against the Panthers with a 41–point differential.
2003	Tie 1–1	Falcons; 20–14 (OT)	Panthers; 23–3	Falcons; 12–6	Panthers lose Super Bowl XXXVIII.
2004	Falcons 2–0	Falcons; 34–31 (OT)	Falcons; 27–10	Falcons; 14–6	Falcons win 7 straight home meetings (1998–2004).
2005	Panthers 2–0	Panthers; 44–11	Panthers; 24–6	Falcons; 14–8	In Atlanta, the Panthers score their most points in a game against the Falcons.
2006	Tie 1–1	Panthers; 10–3	Falcons; 20–6	Falcons; 15–9	
2007	Tie 1–1	Panthers; 27–20	Falcons; 20–13	Falcons; 16–10	
2008	Tie 1–1	Falcons; 45–28	Panthers; 24–9	Falcons; 17–11	First time in which both teams made the playoffs in the same season.
2009	Tie 1–1	Falcons; 28–20	Panthers; 28–19	Falcons; 18–12	

2010s (Falcons, 14–6)

Season	Season series	at Atlanta Falcons	at Carolina Panthers	Overall series	Notes
2010	Falcons 2–0	Falcons; 31–10	Falcons; 31–10	Falcons; 20–12	In Atlanta, the Falcons clinch the NFC South, a first-round bye, and home-field advantage throughout the NFC playoffs with their win.
2011	Falcons 2–0	Falcons; 31–17	Falcons; 31–23	Falcons; 22–12	In North Carolina, Falcons overcame a 23–7 second-half deficit.
2012	Tie 1–1	Falcons; 30–28	Panthers; 30–20	Falcons; 23–13	
2013	Panthers 2–0	Panthers; 21–20	Panthers; 34–10	Falcons; 23–15	In Atlanta, Panthers' win clinched them the NFC South.
2014	Tie 1–1	Panthers; 34–3	Falcons; 19–17	Falcons; 24–16	Panthers' win clinched them the NFC South division, becoming the second team in NFL history to clinch the division with a losing record, and eliminated the Falcons from playoff contention.
2015	Tie 1–1	Falcons; 20–13	Panthers; 38–0	Falcons; 25–17	In North Carolina, Panthers record their largest victory over the Falcons with a 38–point differential. Falcons' victory is the Panthers' only regular season loss in their 2015 season. Panthers lose Super Bowl 50.
2016	Falcons 2–0	Falcons; 48–33	Falcons; 33–16	Falcons; 27–17	In Atlanta, the Falcons finish with 571 total yards, setting a franchise record for their most total yards in a game. Falcons QB Matt Ryan threw for 503 yards, setting a franchise record for their most passing yards in a game (broken in 2024). The Panthers also set a franchise record for the most passing yards allowed in a game. WR Julio Jones finished with 300 receiving yards. Last matchup at Georgia Dome. Falcons lose Super Bowl LI.
2017	Tie 1–1	Falcons; 22–10	Panthers; 20–17	Falcons; 28–18	Falcons open Mercedes-Benz Stadium. Falcons win clinched them the last playoff spot while also denying the Panthers from clinching the NFC South.
2018	Falcons 2–0	Falcons; 31–24	Falcons; 24–10	Falcons; 30–18	
2019	Falcons 2–0	Falcons; 40–20	Falcons; 29–3	Falcons; 32–18	

2020s (Panthers, 8–5)

Season	Season series	at Atlanta Falcons	at Carolina Panthers	Overall series	Notes
2020	Tie 1–1	Panthers; 23–16	Falcons; 25–17	Falcons; 33–19	Following their loss, Falcons fire head coach Dan Quinn.
2021	Tie 1–1	Panthers; 19–13	Falcons; 29–21	Falcons; 34–20	
2022	Tie 1–1	Falcons; 37–34 (OT)	Panthers; 25–15	Falcons; 35–21	
2023	Tie 1–1	Falcons; 24–10	Panthers; 9–7	Falcons; 36–22	
2024	Tie 1–1	Panthers; 44–38 (OT)	Falcons; 38–20	Falcons; 37–23	In Atlanta, Panthers tied their most points scored in a game against the Falcons (2005).
2025	Panthers 2–0	Panthers; 30–27 (OT)	Panthers; 30–0	Falcons; 37–25	In Atlanta, Panthers quarterback Bryce Young threw for 448 yards, setting a franchise record for most passing yards in a game. Panthers completed their first season sweep of the Falcons since the 2013 season. Falcons’ win over the Saints in the season finale clinched the NFC South title for the Panthers; the Panthers, Buccaneers, and Falcons all finished 8–9, but the Panthers won the three-way tiebreaker based on head-to-head record among the tied teams.
2026	Panthers 1–0	Panthers; 34–3	January 9/10	Falcons; 37–26	

Summary of Results

Season	Season series	at Atlanta Falcons	at Carolina Panthers	Notes
Regular season	Falcons 37–26	Falcons 21–11	Falcons 16–15	

== See also ==
- NFC South – Division of the National Football Conference
- List of NFL rivalries – Overview of rivalries in the National Football League
