= Piedmont Crescent =

Region in the U.S. state of North Carolina

Map of the Piedmont Crescent

The Piedmont Crescent, also known as the Piedmont Urban Crescent, is a large, polycentric urbanized region in the U.S. state of North Carolina that forms the northern section of the rapidly developing Piedmont Atlantic megalopolis (or "megaregion"), a conurbation also known as the "I-85 Boombelt", which extends from the Raleigh area in North Carolina, southwards to Atlanta, Georgia in the southeastern United States.

The region includes seven of North Carolina's ten largest cities (with the exception of south-central Fayetteville, coastal Wilmington and eastern Greenville) and encompasses many smaller cities, towns, and suburban areas. The three major metropolitan areas within the Piedmont Crescent are the Research Triangle, Piedmont Triad, and Charlotte metropolitan area, which have a total population of 7,492,161 people, roughly the same in geographic area (11,256.36 sq mi) and population as the Atlanta, Georgia region (7,221,137 / 10,494.03 sq mi), and together representing over 69% of the state's total population.

Eleven major universities—Duke, NC State, UNC Chapel Hill, UNC Charlotte, NC Central, Wake Forest, Winston-Salem State University, UNC-Greensboro, NC A&T State University, Elon University and High Point University —and three international airports (CLT, RDU and GSO), as well as Research Triangle Park, also are located within the Piedmont Crescent.

== History ==
Residents commonly attribute the development of the Crescent communities to the Indian Trading Path and related settlements established by indigenous peoples long before European contact. The Trading Path was also used by European traders, and later by settlers entering the backcountry regions of the piedmont of North Carolina, South Carolina and Georgia.

Historian Allen W. Trelease attributed the modern development of the Piedmont Crescent to the laying of the North Carolina Railroad (NCRR), which was required by its charter to connect the cities of Raleigh, Salisbury, and Charlotte. The railroad itself passed through all major Piedmont Crescent cities except Winston-Salem and preceded the establishment of the cities of Durham, Burlington, and High Point. Geographer D. Brooks Cates argued that the railroad traced an already-existing pattern of traffic and movement in the region.

Forming the shape of a crescent in North Carolina, the region is located in the central Piedmont area of the state. European-American settlement progressed generally from the east to the west, from what is now metropolitan Raleigh-Durham and the Research Triangle area at its eastern edge, through the Piedmont Triad cities of Greensboro and Winston-Salem at its center, and southwest to metropolitan Charlotte. This region has undergone sustained population and economic growth (acutely in the Charlotte and Raleigh areas) since the late 19th century, a trend that has accelerated since the late 20th century. It is notable as the fourth-largest manufacturing region in the country, as well as an international center of banking and finance, textiles, biotech and high technology.

The Piedmont Crescent name is thought to have been coined when the NCRR first laid tracks through the area in 1855–56. The railway, which was named the "Piedmont Crescent Railroad", brought extensive growth to the communities along its route. These evolved to comprise today's interlinked urbanized region. Although the freight and passenger rail corridor remains of critical importance, the region's Interstate 85 and Interstate 40 freeway system serves as its primary transportation link today.

== Major cities ==
=== Primary cities ===
- Charlotte (880,000+)
- Raleigh (470,000+)
- Greensboro (290,000+)
- Durham (270,000+)
- Winston-Salem (250,000+)
- Cary (170,000+)
- High Point (110,000+)

=== Core counties ===
County	2020 Estimate	2010 Census	Change
Wake County	1,132,271	900,993	+25.67%
Mecklenburg County	1,128,945	919,628	+22.76%
Guilford County	540,521	488,406	+10.67%
Forsyth County	383,843	350,670	+9.46%
Durham County	327,306	267,587	+22.32%
Gaston County	226,568	206,086	+9.94%
Cabarrus County	221,479	178,011	+24.42%
Davidson County	169,234	162,878	+3.90%
Alamance County	171,346	151,131	+13.38%
Rowan County	142,495	138,428	+2.94%
Orange County	149,077	133,801	+11.42%
Counties Total	4,593,085	3,897,619	+17.84%

=== Other cities ===
- Belmont
- Burlington
- Carrboro
- Chapel Hill
- Clemmons
- Concord
- Garner
- Gastonia
- Matthews
- Monroe
- Graham
- Hillsborough
- Kannapolis
- Kernersville
- Lexington
- Mebane
- Salisbury
- Thomasville
- Huntersville

== See also ==
- Conurbation
- Megalopolis
- Megaregions of the United States
- Piedmont (train)

== Works cited ==
- Trelease, Allen W. (1991). The North Carolina Railroad, 1849–1871, and the Modernization of North Carolina. UNC Press. ISBN 0-8078-1941-7.
