= Cherokee Springs, South Carolina =

Unincorporated community in South Carolina, US

Coordinates: 35°02′59″N 81°53′27″W

Cherokee Springs is an unincorporated community in Spartanburg County, in the U.S. state of South Carolina.

== History ==
The community was named after the Cherokee Indians. Cherokee Springs was a popular mineral spa resort in the late 19th century.

An old variant name of the community was Cherokee. A post office called Cherokee was established in 1888, and remained in operation until 1933.
