= Interstate 85 =

Interstate Highway across the southeastern US

Interstate 85

Route information
- Length: 666.05 mi (1,071.90 km)
- Existed: August 14, 1957–present
- NHS: Entire route

Major junctions
- South end: I-65 / US 82 in Montgomery, AL
- I-75 through Atlanta, GA; I-20 in Atlanta, GA; I-26 near Spartanburg, SC; I-77 / US 21 in Charlotte, NC; I-74 near Archdale, NC; I-73 in Greensboro, NC; I-40 from Greensboro, NC to Hillsborough, NC
- North end: I-95 / US 460 in Petersburg, VA

Location
- Country: United States
- States: Alabama, Georgia, South Carolina, North Carolina, Virginia

Highway system
- Interstate Highway System; Main; Auxiliary; Suffixed; Business; Future

Interstate 85 (I-85) is a major Interstate Highway in the Southeastern United States. Its southern terminus is at an interchange with I-65 in Montgomery, Alabama; its northern terminus is an interchange with I-95 in Petersburg, Virginia, near Richmond. It is nominally north–south as it carries an odd number, but it is physically oriented northeast–southwest and covers a larger east–west span than north–south. While most Interstates that end in a "5" are cross-country, I-85 is primarily a regional route serving five southeastern states: Virginia, North Carolina, South Carolina, Georgia, and Alabama.

Major metropolitan areas served by I-85 include the Greater Richmond Region in Virginia, the Research Triangle, Piedmont Triad, and Charlotte metropolitan area regions of North Carolina, Upstate South Carolina, the Atlanta metropolitan area in Georgia, and the Montgomery metropolitan area in Alabama. Proposals have been made to extend I-85 along the US Route 80 (US 80) corridor into Mississippi. Because of its unusually diagonal nature, portions of I-85 are to the west of I-75, which puts I-85 out of the Interstate grid.

== Route description ==
Lengths
	mi	km
AL	80.00	128.75
GA	179.90	289.52
SC	106.28	171.04
NC	231.23	372.13
VA	68.64	110.47
Total	666.05	1,071.90

I-85 is a route that serves several major locations in the Southeastern United States, stretching from Alabama to Virginia serving major metropolitan areas such as Atlanta and Charlotte.

=== Alabama ===
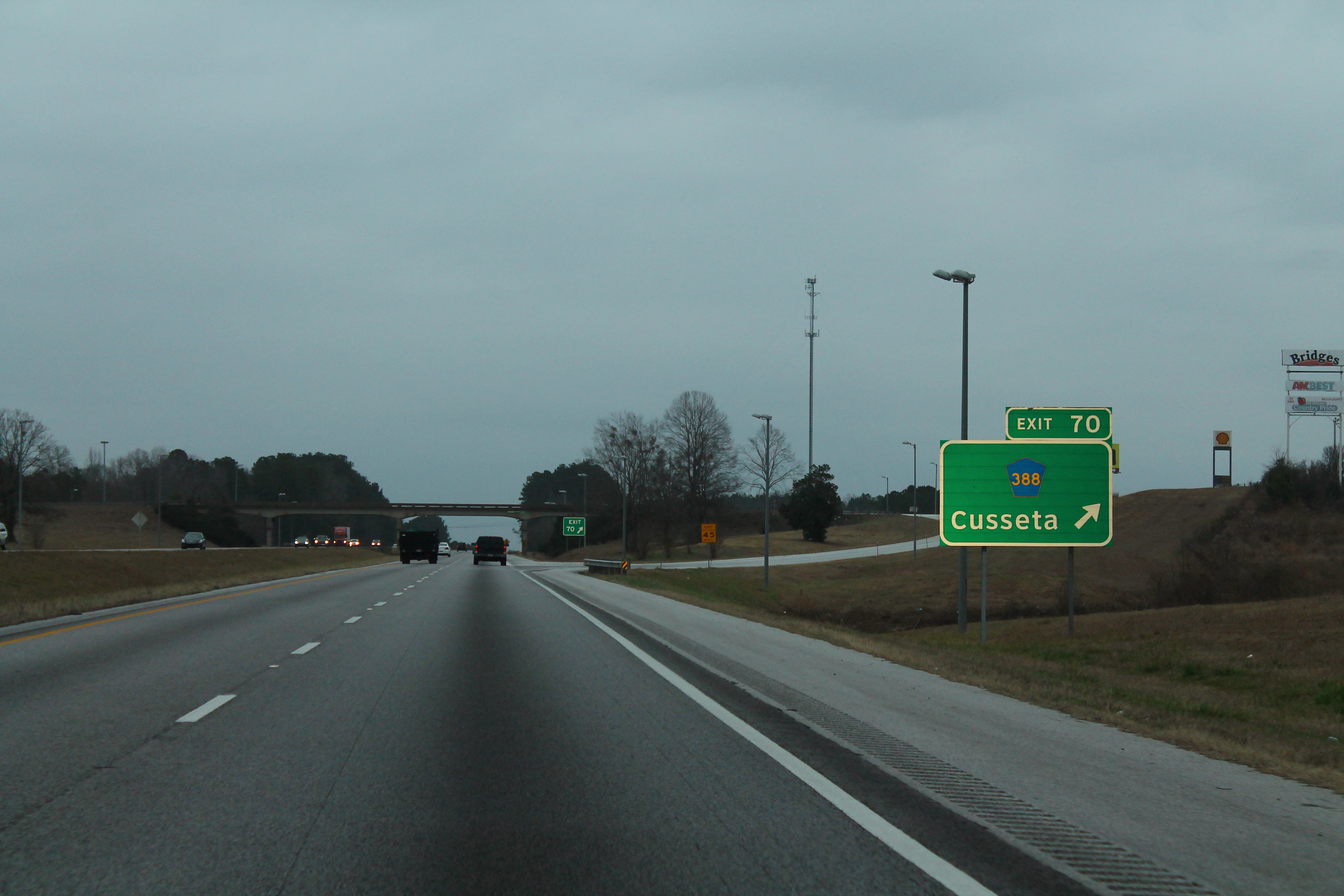
I-85 southwest of Cusseta

I-85 begins as a T intersection off I-65 in Montgomery. From there, I-85 parallels US 80 until the highway nears Tuskegee. At Tuskegee, I-85 leaves US 80 and starts to parallel US 29, which the highway parallels for much of its length.

I-85 also passes near Auburn, Opelika, Valley, and Lanett before crossing the Chattahoochee River into Georgia.

I-85 is planned to be rerouted southward just east of Montgomery, where it will intersect with I-65 just south of downtown Montgomery and then have a future southern terminus at the concurrency of I-20/I-59 just northeast of Cuba. Future I-685 will be the new designation for the route of current I-85, which leads directly to I-65 in downtown Montgomery.

=== Georgia ===
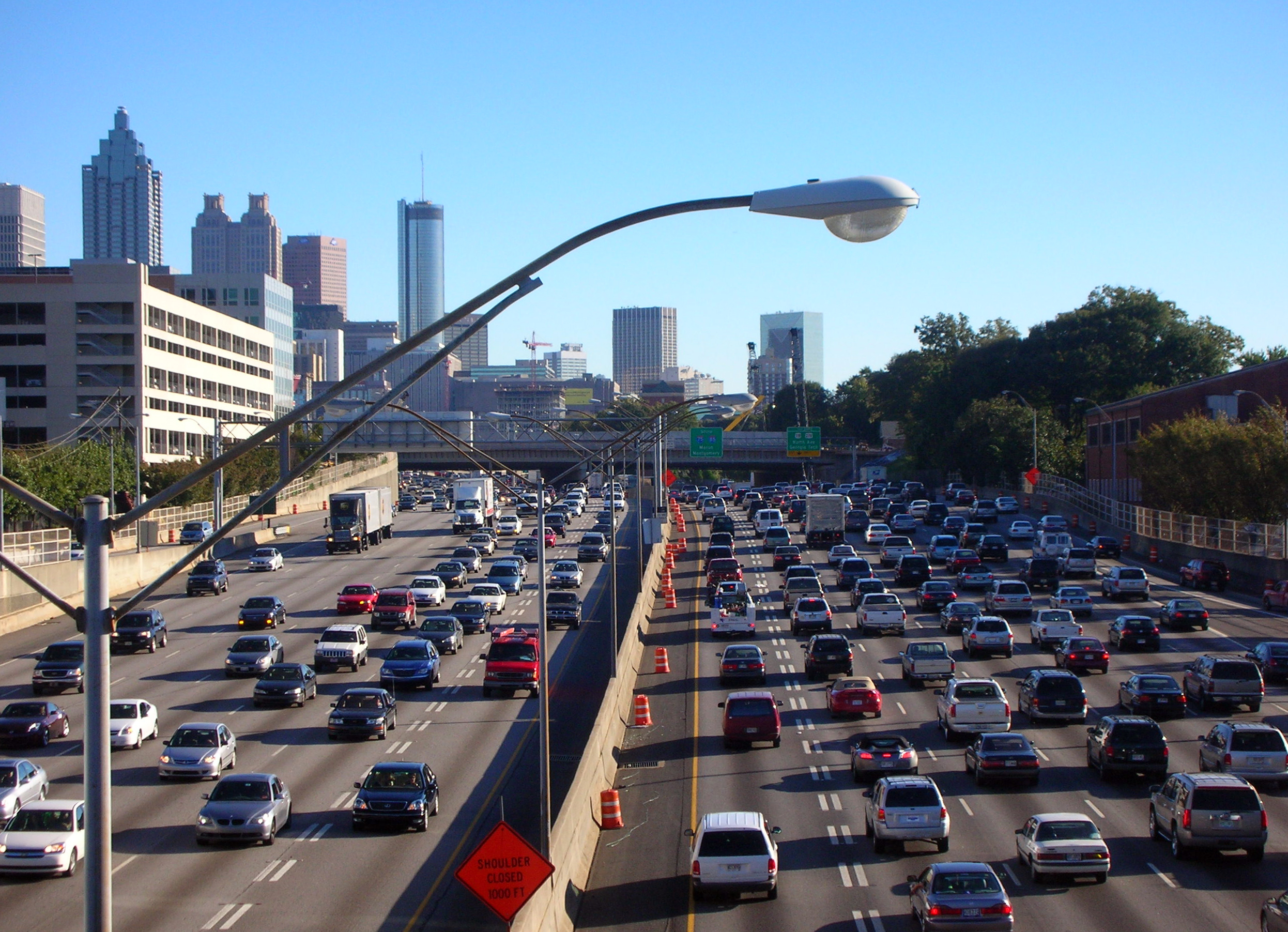
I-75 cosigned with I-85 in Downtown Atlanta

In Georgia, I-85 (unsigned State Route 403 [SR 403]) bypasses West Point before coming into the LaGrange area. East of LaGrange, I-85 intersects I-185 which connects to Columbus and Fort Benning. In the Atlanta area, I-85 intersects I-20 and merges with I-75 (Downtown Connector) through the downtown area. North of Atlanta, I-985 provides a link to Gainesville before I-85 continues through northeastern Georgia and then crosses into South Carolina.

=== South Carolina ===
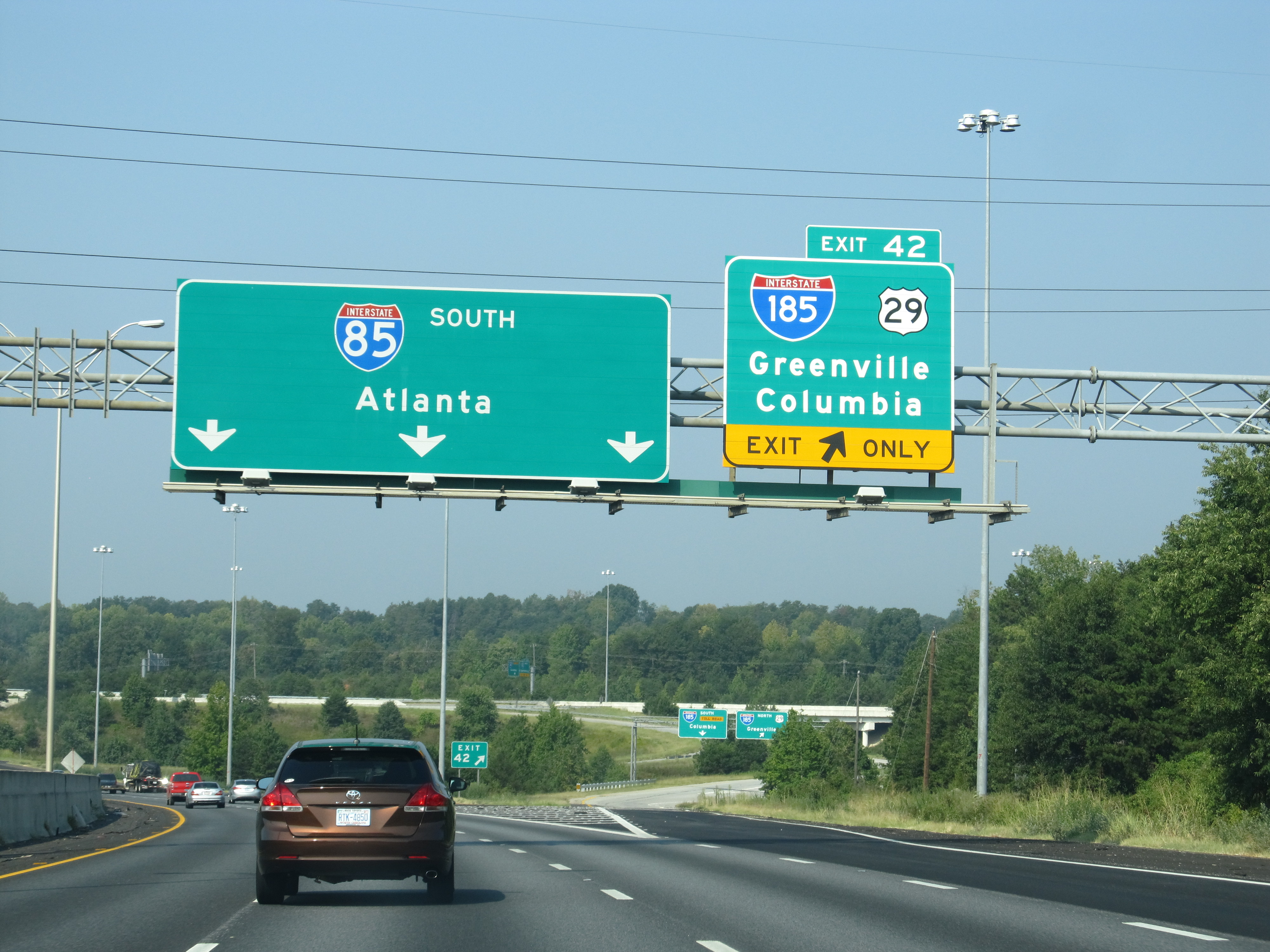
I-85 southbound at interchange with I-185/US 29 in Greenville

I-85 provides the major transportation route for the Upstate of South Carolina, linking together the major centers of Greenville and Spartanburg with regional centers of importance. In Spartanburg, BMW has a major manufacturing plant that can be seen from the highway. In South Carolina, I-85 bypasses Clemson and Anderson on the way to Greenville. Beginning at Anderson, I-85 widens from four to six lanes. Near Powdersville, US 29 joins I-85 and they run concurrently until they cross the Saluda River. I-85 bypasses just south of Greenville but provides two links into the city via spur routes I-185 and I-385.

I-85 also has direct exits to Greenville–Spartanburg International Airport, which serves the Greenville–Spartanburg metropolitan area. I-85 then bypasses the city of Spartanburg to the north. Its original route is now signed as I-85 Business (I-85 Bus) and was approved by the American Association of State Highway and Transportation Officials (AASHTO) on April 22, 1995. Near milemarker 70, I-85 intersects with I-26. The exits are signed as exits 70A for eastbound traffic and 70B for westbound traffic. North of Spartanburg, I-85 narrows from six lanes back to four lanes and continues inside Gaffney. Much of the terrain between Spartanburg and the North Carolina border is rural in nature but congested to the state line due to its location near Charlotte.

=== North Carolina ===
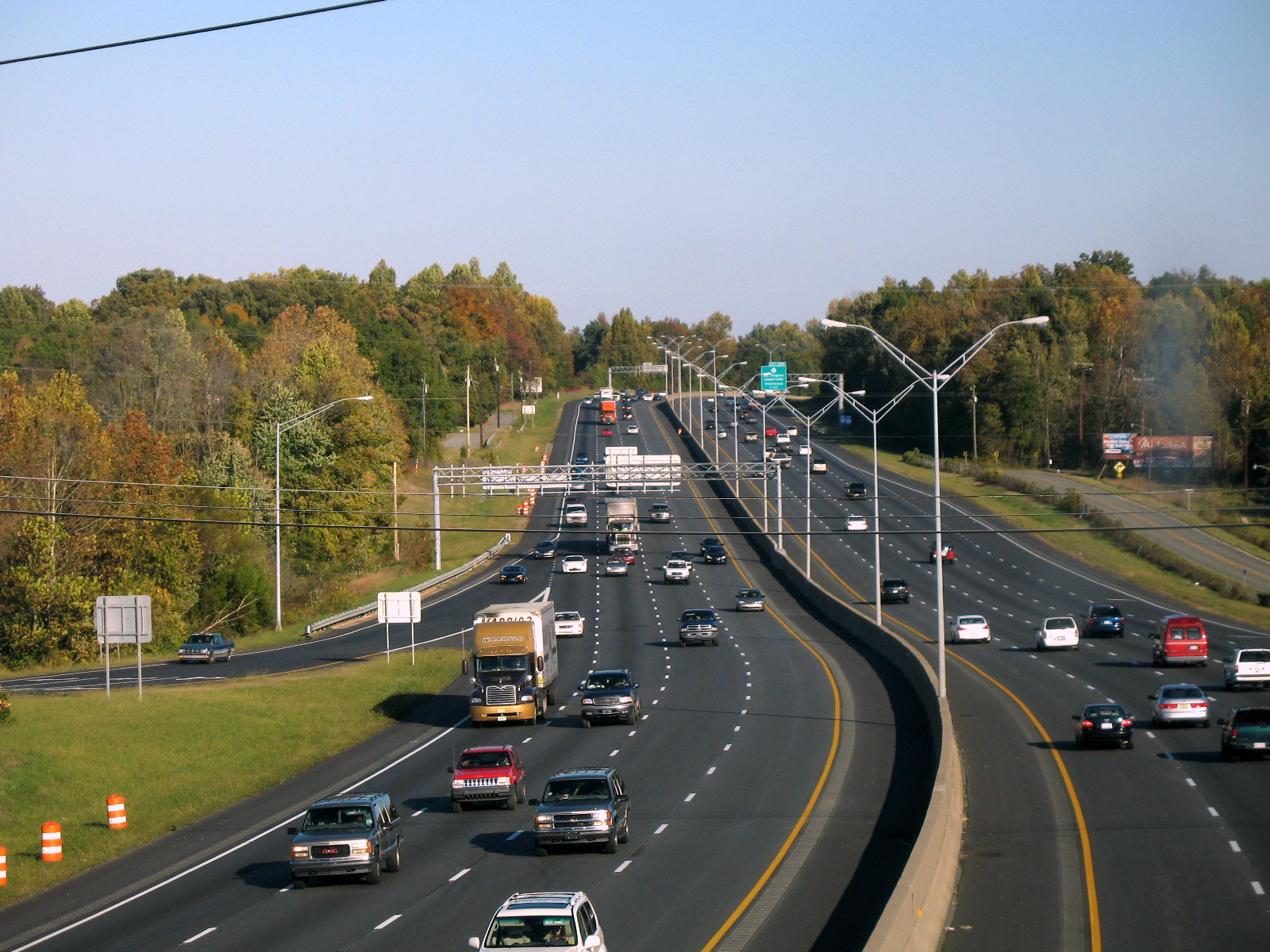
I-40/I-85 through Burlington

In North Carolina, I-85 enters a relatively rural area inside The Foothills of the state, surrounding Kings Mountain. The interstate enters into Gastonia, before entering into Charlotte. Inside Charlotte, I-85 is adjacent to the Charlotte Douglas International Airport and turns northeastward just before reaching Uptown Charlotte; thus, I-85 just traverses in the northern outskirts of uptown where it junctions with I-77. North of Charlotte, the highway goes in mostly the outskirts of the municipalities of Concord, Salisbury, Lexington, and High Point before reaching Greensboro.

I-85 continues in the southern outskirts of Greensboro, before I-40 merges onto it, when exiting Greensboro. The concurrent two routes are cosigned when they traverse south of the downtown areas of Burlington, Graham, and Mebane, before they separate in Hillsborough where I-40 turns toward Chapel Hill, Cary, and Raleigh. After the diversion with I-40, I-85 continues to Durham, before turning northeastward through Oxford then Henderson toward Virginia.

=== Virginia ===
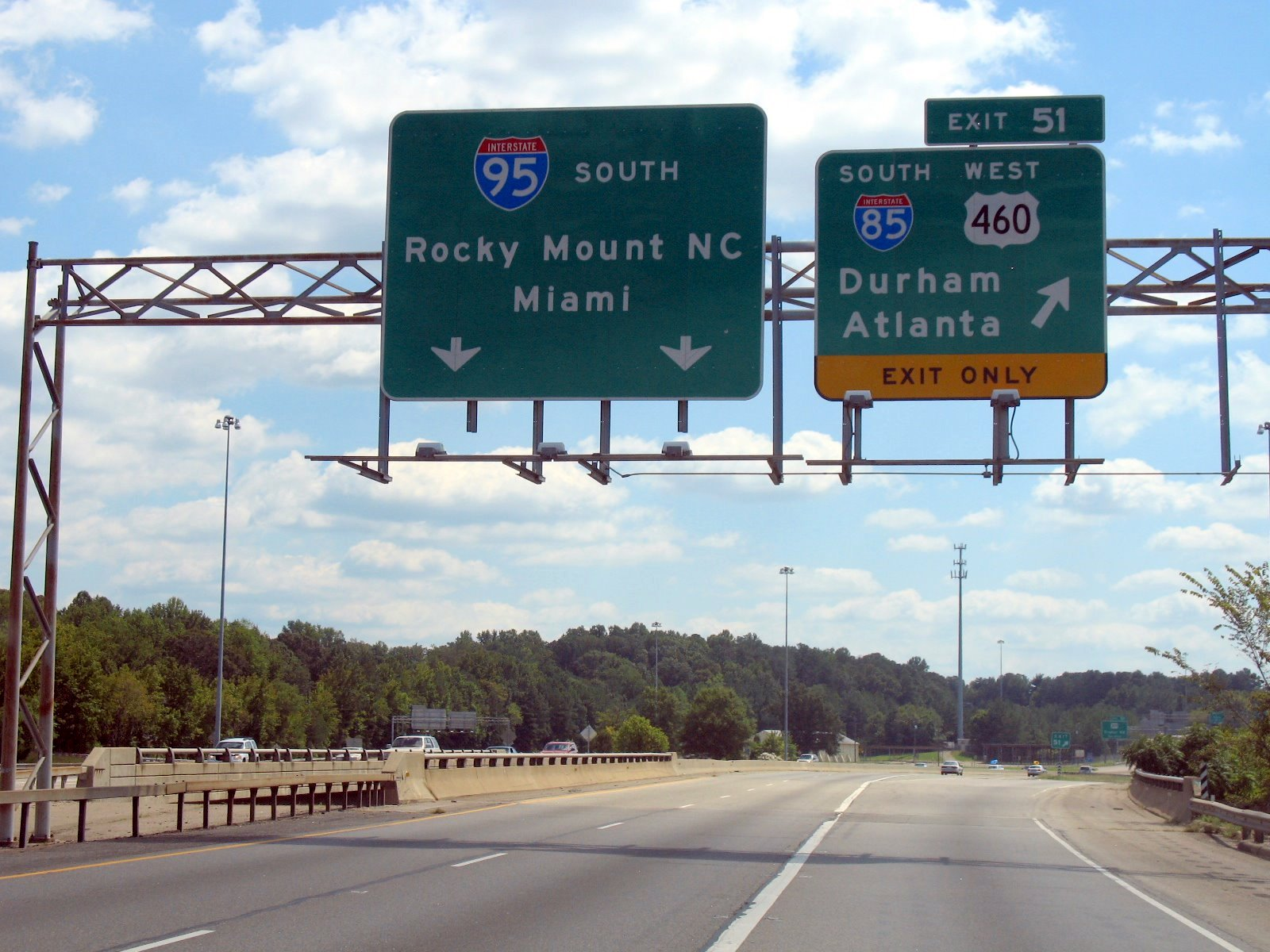
I-85's northern terminus at I-95 near Petersburg

Starting from the Virginia border, the route passes South Hill and McKenney before heading into a large forest. After the forest, I-85 reaches Petersburg and ends at I-95. The highway is briefly cosigned with US 460 from a few miles west of Petersburg in Dinwiddie County to I-95. I-85 follows the same general path as US 1 (Boydton Plank Road and Jefferson Davis Highway), as the two cross several times between the North Carolina border and the northern terminus outside Petersburg.

== History ==
In the northern half of I-85, the route roughly parallels an ancient Indian trading path documented since colonial times from Petersburg, Virginia, to the Catawba Indian territory.

I-85 near Petersburg once formed the southern end of the Richmond–Petersburg Turnpike, which was completed in 1958. The tolls were removed in 1992 after I-295 was completed.

Before a 2010 decision to raise the speed limit in the state to 70 mph (110 km/h), Virginia's portion of I-85 was also the only Interstate Highway in the state with a posted speed limit greater than 65 mph (105 km/h). It was raised from 65 to 70 mph (105 to 113 km/h) on July 1, 2006, by the state legislature.

In 2004, I-85 was rerouted around Greensboro; and it split with I-40 eight miles (13 km) east of the original departure point. I-40 ran with I-85 along the bypass to the southern/western end and I-40 continued on a new freeway alignment at exit 121 until September 2008, when it was rerouted back to its old alignment through the city. Despite its reroute around Greensboro, the overall length for I-85 in North Carolina remains the same as before.

On the evening of March 30, 2017 a massive fire collapsed a bridge on I-85 in Atlanta. As a result, I-85 was closed to traffic for approximately two miles (3.2 km) between its split with I-75 and the interchange with SR 400.

== Major junctions ==
Alabama
I-65 / US 82 in Montgomery
US 80 / US 231 in Montgomery. I-85/US 80 travels concurrently to Waugh.
US 80 in Waugh
US 29 in Auburn. The highway travels concurrently to Opelika.
US 280 in Opelika. The highway travels concurrently through Opelika.
US 280 / US 431 in Opelika
US 29 in Opelika
US 29 in Valley
Georgia
US 27 in LaGrange
I-185 near LaGrange
US 29 in Grantville
US 27 Alt. / US 29 in Newnan
I-285 near College Park
US 19 / US 41 in Atlanta
I-75 in Atlanta. The highway travels concurrently through Atlanta.
I-20 in Atlanta
US 29 / US 78 / US 278 in Atlanta
US 23 near Atlanta
I-285 near Doraville
I-985 near Buford
US 129 near Jefferson
US 441 near Commerce
South Carolina
US 76 north of Anderson
US 178 north of Anderson
US 29 northeast of Anderson. The highway travels concurrently to I-185.
I-185 / US 29 near Greenville
US 25 in Greenville
US 276 in Greenville
I-385 in Greenville
US 29 near Greer
I-26 near Spartanburg
US 176 near Spartanburg
US 221 near Cherokee Springs
US 29 near Grover, North Carolina
North Carolina
US 29 near Kings Mountain. The highway travels concurrently to US 74.
US 29 / US 74 in Kings Mountain
US 321 in Gastonia
I-485 in Charlotte
I-77 / US 21 in Charlotte
I-485 in Charlotte
US 29 / US 601 in Concord. I-85/US 601 travels concurrently to Salisbury.
US 601 in Salisbury
US 52 in Salisbury. The highway travels concurrently to I-285.
US 29 / US 70 near Spencer. The highway travels concurrently to I-285.
I-285 / US 29 / US 52 / US 70 in Lexington
US 64 southeast of Lexington
I-74 near Archdale
US 29 in Greensboro. The highway travels concurrently to I-73/US 421.
I-73 / US 29 / US 421 in Greensboro. I-73/I-85/US 421 travels concurrently through Greensboro.
I-73 / US 220 in Greensboro
US 421 in Greensboro
I-40 / I-785 / I-840 in Greensboro. I-40/I-85 travels concurrently until reaching Hillsborough.
US 70 in Eno. The highway travels concurrently to Durham.
US 15 / US 501 in Durham. I-85/US 15 travels concurrently to near Butner. I-85/US 501 travels concurrently through Durham.
US 501 in Durham
I-885 / US 70 in Durham
US 15 near Butner
US 15 near Oxford
US 158 in Oxford
US 158 in Henderson. The highway travels concurrently through Henderson.
US 1 in Henderson
US 1 / US 158 in Middleburg
US 1 / US 401 northeast of Manson
Virginia
US 58 near South Hill
US 1 in South Hill
US 1 near Sturgeonville
US 460 near Petersburg. The highways travel concurrently to I-95.
US 1 near Petersburg
I-95 / US 460 in Petersburg

== Related routes ==
- I-85 Bus in Lexington, High Point, and Greensboro, North Carolina. (Former designation)
- I-85 Bus in Spartanburg, South Carolina.
- I-185 to Columbus, Georgia.
- I-185 in Greenville, South Carolina.
- I-285 in Atlanta, Georgia.
- I-285 to Winston-Salem, North Carolina.
- I-385 in Greenville, South Carolina.
- I-485 in Charlotte, North Carolina.
- I-585 to Spartanburg, South Carolina.
- I-785 in Greensboro, North Carolina.
- I-885 in Durham, North Carolina.
- I-985 to Gainesville, Georgia.

== See also ==
- Death Valley (North Carolina)
- I-85 Rivalry
- Piedmont Atlantic Megaregion the megalopolis that largely follows I-85
- Southeast High Speed Rail Corridor
- Charlanta
