= Interstate 73 in North Carolina =

Highway in North Carolina

Interstate 73
- I-73 highlighted in red; future sections in blue; unbuilt sections in orange

Route information
- Maintained by NCDOT
- Length: 121.52 mi (195.57 km)
- Existed: 1997–present
- NHS: Entire route

Major junctions
- South end: I-74 / US 74 / US 74 Bus. near Rockingham
- US 64 / NC 49 in Asheboro; I-74 near Randleman; I-85 / US 220 / US 421 in Greensboro; I-40 / I-840 / US 421 in Greensboro
- North end: US 220 / NC 68 near Stokesdale

Location
- Country: United States
- State: North Carolina
- Counties: Richmond, Montgomery, Randolph, Guilford, Rockingham

Highway system
- Interstate Highway System; Main; Auxiliary; Suffixed; Business; Future; North Carolina Highway System; Interstate; US; State; Scenic
← NC 72	→ NC 73

Interstate 73 (I-73) is a partially completed Interstate Highway in the US state of North Carolina, traversing the state from northwest of Rockingham to near Summerfield through Asheboro and Greensboro. When completed, it will continue south toward Myrtle Beach, South Carolina, and north to Price, North Carolina at the Virginia-North Carolina border.

== Route description ==
As of 2025, I-73 begins northwest of Rockingham, in concurrency with I-74 to north of Asheboro. I-73 and I-74 travel north through northern Richmond County and into eastern Montgomery County. In Montgomery County, the Interstates pass between the county's eastern border and the Uwharrie National Forest. The freeway enters Randolph County and passes just west of Asheboro. In Randleman, I-74 splits northwest toward High Point and Winston-Salem. North of the I-74 split, I-73 passes over Randleman Lake, a reservoir formed by the blocking of the Deep River and passes into Guilford County. Entering Greensboro, it ends its concurrency with US 220 as it goes northwest along the Greensboro Urban Loop with US 421 after a brief parallel with I-85. At its connection with I-40, US 421 continues north (or geographically west) with I-40 to Winston-Salem, while I-73 continues and I-840 begins. At the Bryan Boulevard exit, I-73 separates from I-840, the latter continuing northeast along the loop. Meanwhile, I-73 turns westward, passing Piedmont Triad International Airport and continuing until it crosses NC 68. The road then resumes its northward direction, stretching eight miles (13 km) before reconverging with US 220 near the Haw River. It then proceeds four miles (6.4 km) further north along a newly widened stretch of US 220 to another interchange with NC 68 which was completed in December 2017 but not signed as I-73 until March 2018.

== History ==
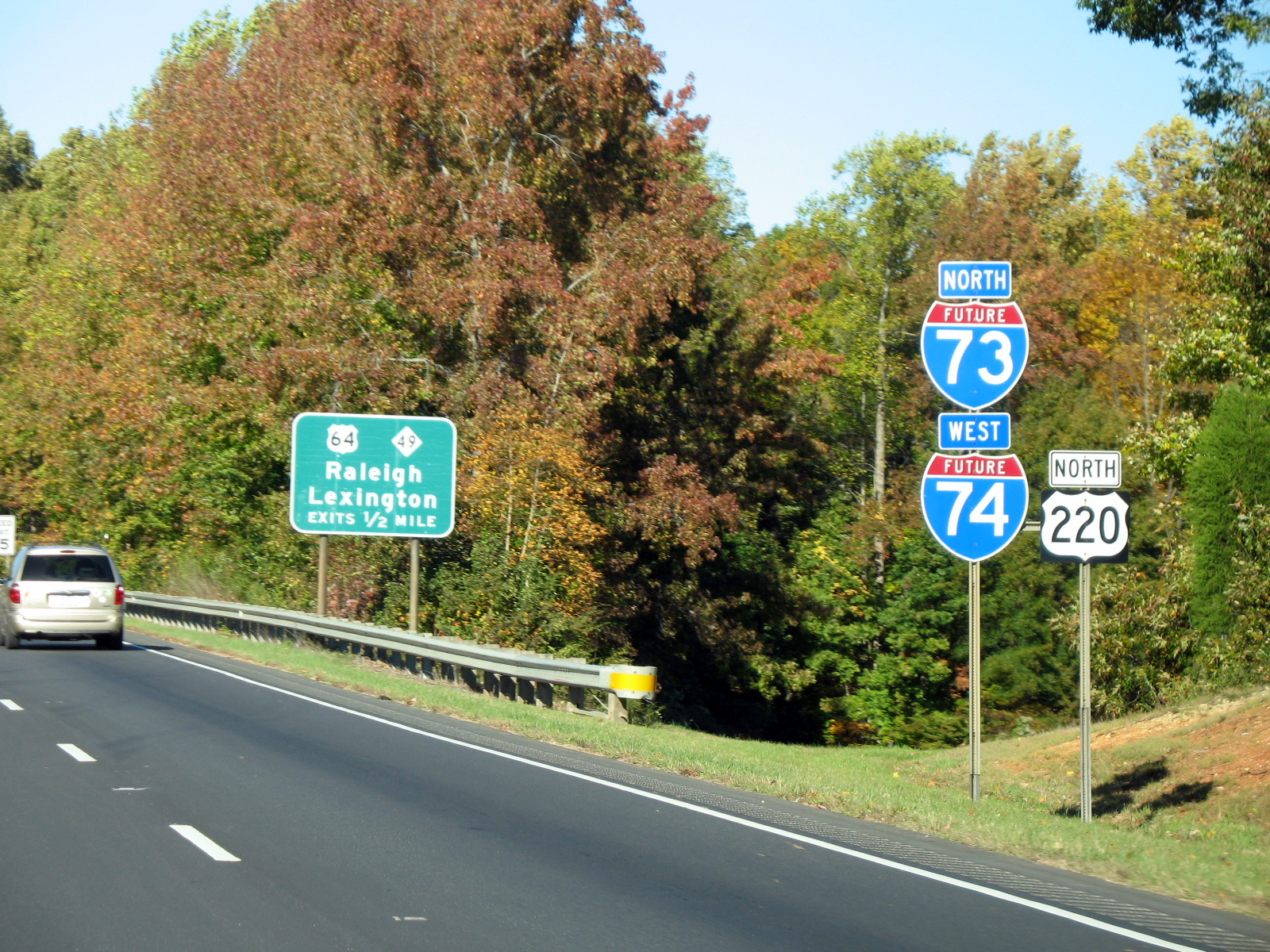
Future I-73 and I-74 (US 220) northbound near Asheboro in 2006; signs were removed when the freeway was designated I-73/I-74 in 2012

Authorized by the Intermodal Surface Transportation Efficiency Act of 1991 (ISTEA), I-73 was established as a north–south high-priority corridor from Charleston, South Carolina, to Detroit, Michigan.

In North Carolina, because several U.S. Highways were already planned for improvements in the central Piedmont region, I-73 was initially aligned to go through Rockingham, Asheboro, High Point, Winston-Salem, and Mount Airy. The route through High Point was approved in May 1993. However, in November 1993, an organization called Job Link, made up of business leaders from northern North Carolina and southern Virginia, wanted a major highway to connect Roanoke with the Greensboro area. It could be I-73, the group said, but did not have to be. In April 1995, John Warner, who chaired the Senate subcommittee which would select the route of I-73, announced his support for the Job Link proposal. This distressed Winston-Salem officials who were counting on I-73, though Greensboro had never publicly sought the road. But an aide to US Senator Lauch Faircloth said the 1991 law authorizing I-73 required the road to go through Winston-Salem. Faircloth got around this requirement, though, by asking Warner to call the highway to Winston-Salem I-74. In May, Warner announced plans to propose legislation that made the plan for two Interstates official.

When I-73 crossed a border between two states, the federal law authorizing the road required that the two states agree that their sections meet. Originally, both Carolinas selected a route running south from Rockingham. However, North Carolina had more money to spend on roads, and, on May 10, 1995, the US Senate Environment and Public Works Committee approved North Carolina's plan for I-73 to run eastward to the coast and enter South Carolina at North Myrtle Beach. Later that year, officials in both states agreed that I-73 would enter South Carolina south of Rockingham and that the other highway would be I-74. This raised the possibility of I-73 bypassing the Myrtle Beach area entirely, since I-74 would run to the Myrtle Beach area.

In May 1997, the first section of I-73 was established, a 12.6-mile (20.3 km) section from south of Candor to Ulah. Signage of "Future Interstate 73" was also placed all along US 220, from Rockingham north to I-40 in Greensboro and south to Candor. On January 7, 2008, a 17-mile (27 km) extension south of Candor to Ellerbe was completed; however, because the North Carolina Department of Transportation (NCDOT) had not applied to the Federal Highway Administration (FHWA) to add the segment to the Interstate System, signage along the new stretch of freeway was listed as Future I-73, thus not an "official" addition to the Interstate at that time. Federal approval was granted in 2010 to make this part of the Interstate System at the conclusion of work to upgrade the highway in Asheboro. The route was given Interstate signage in mid-2013.

The next section to be completed and signed I-73 was the 7.5-mile (12.1 km) southwestern section of the Greensboro Urban Loop, in concurrency with I-40, in February 2008. The concurrency later changed to US 421 in September of same year (signage corrected by July 2009).

The newest sections of I-73 to be completed are the eight-mile (13 km) stretch of US 220 freeway in Asheboro, the remaining parts of the US 220 freeway designated Future I-73 in 1997, and the six-mile (9.7 km) section from the Bryan Boulevard interchange northward back to US 220. The Asheboro section had several deficiencies that needed to be corrected before it could be designated an Interstate. Work started on this segment from US 220 Business (US 220 Bus.)/NC 134 south of Asheboro to US 220 Bus./Vision Drive north of Asheboro in 2010. Work was completed in October 2012. When work was finished, I-73 (and I-74) shields replaced the Future I-73 (and I-74) shields along this portion of US 220. NCDOT had already reached an agreement with the FHWA that they could sign the entire length of the US 220 freeway south of Greensboro to Ellerbe as I-73 once this project was completed. On July 11, 2012, NCDOT gave final approval an extension of I-73 from I-85 to Asheboro to be designated as part of its network. A contract to change the Future I-73 signs to I-73 shields and replace current exit signage with Interstate standard ones was let on December 11, 2012. In February 2013, work crews began converting a 70-mile (110 km) stretch of signage for I-73 work was completed in December 2013. I-73 is thus signed continuously from US 220 north of Greensboro to US 220 in Ellerbe, a total of 84 miles (135 km). Part of the highway completed but not signed currently as I-73 is the US 74 Rockingham Bypass, a total of about 10 miles (16 km), but cannot be signed as an Interstate since it is not connected to the rest of I-73. Therefore, North Carolina has completed a total of 104 miles (167 km) of current or future I-73 mileage.

Construction began in April 2014 on I-73 from NC 68, near Piedmont Triad International Airport, to US 220 near the Haw River. Seven miles of this section to US 220 in Summerfield opened May 19, 2017, while the remainder opened the evening of July 2, 2017. The latest segment of I-73 being completed was a four-mile (6.4 km) segment along a widened section of US 220 from near the Haw River north to its intersection with NC 68. Two contracts, one widening US 220, Project R-2413C, which started in May 2012, the other reconfiguring the NC 68 intersection into an interchange, started in September 2015, were completed in December 2017. The new NC 68 south interchange opened in May 2017. I-73 signs, including an "End I-73" sign beyond the NC 68 exit, were put up in March 2018.

The Western Rockingham Bypass, from the US 74/US 74 Bus. interchange to US 220, near Ellerbe, had all right-of-way purchases completed along the proposed route. Construction on a 3.724-mile (5.993 km) section, along US 220 (south of Ellerbe), began in March 2014; with a contracted amount of $49.8 million (equivalent to $66.6 million in 2025), and was completed in April 2018. The remaining sections of the new bypass were scheduled to start construction by late 2017; however, under reprioritization of construction projects announced in 2014, they were first removed from the list of projects to be started through 2024 then had funding restored with a construction date of 2022 in mid-2016. In January 2017, however, the project, though still funded, was delayed four years due to a low score in prioritizing projects for the 2018–2027 NCDOT State Transportation Improvement Program. On January 9, 2019, it was announced that the North Carolina State Transportation Improvement Program for 2020 to 2029 included connecting I-73 with US 74 six years sooner than planned. A $146.1-million (equivalent to $181 million in 2025) contract was awarded for the 7.2 miles (11.6 km) of four-lane freeway with "substantial completion" by late 2023. The bypass was completed and opened to traffic on January 28, 2025.

== Future ==
I-73 from the South Carolina state line to US 74/NC 38 interchange is being planned and paid for by the South Carolina Department of Transportation (SCDOT). Environmental studies were completed in 2011, with a route that includes an interchange at Ghio Road and welcome centers at the state line. The time frame when construction will begin is unknown at this time.

The northernmost section, 18-mile (29 km) along US 220 from NC 68 north to the Virginia border, may be the last segment completed with NCDOT waiting to see whether Virginia is going to commit to constructing their section of I-73 south of Roanoke before commitments are made for funding. The only action taken along this segment was to replace the existing Future I-73 Corridor signs with Future I-73 signs in 2016. The extension of I-73 to the Virginia state line was listed in the NCDOT 2024-2033 State Transportation Improvement, although it is not fully funded.

== Exit list ==
County	Location	mi	km	Old exit	New exit	Destinations	Notes
Scotland						I-73 south – Myrtle Beach	Future continuation into South Carolina
Richmond						Ghio Road	Future interchange (unfunded)
Richmond						I-74 east / US 74 east – Laurinburg	Future interchange (unfunded) and future eastern end of I-74 overlap
Richmond				319		NC 38 – Bennettsville	Existing interchanges on US 74 (built to Interstate standards, not signed over lack of a connection to Interstate)
Richmond				316		NC 177 – Hamlet	Existing interchanges on US 74 (built to Interstate standards, not signed over lack of a connection to Interstate)
Richmond	Rockingham			311	12	US 1 – Rockingham, Southern Pines, Cheraw	Existing interchanges on US 74 (built to Interstate standards, not signed over lack of a connection to Interstate)
Richmond				308	15	Galestown Road – Cordova	Existing interchanges on US 74 (built to Interstate standards, not signed over lack of a connection to Interstate)
Richmond				306	16	US 74 west / US 74 Bus. east – Monroe, Rockingham	Signed as exits 16A (east) and 16B (west). Southern terminus of I-73; southern end of I-74 overlap
Richmond					20	Cartledge Creek Road	
Richmond		22.4	36.0		22	US 220 south – Rockingham	Southern end of US 220 overlap
Richmond		23.2	37.3		23	Dockery Road / Haywood Cemetery Road	
Richmond		24.9	40.1	8	25	US 220 north – Ellerbe	Northern end of US 220 overlap
Richmond	Ellerbe	27.5	44.3	11	28	To NC 73 west / Millstone Road	
Richmond		29.9	48.1	13	30	Haywood Parker Road	
Richmond		33.1	53.3	16	33	NC 73 – Windblow, Plainview	
Richmond	Norman	35.0	56.3	18	35	Moore Street – Norman	
Montgomery		39.0	62.8	22	39	Tabernacle Church Road	
Montgomery	Emery	40.9	65.8	24	41	US 220 south / US 220 Alt. north – Candor	Southern end of US 220 overlap
Montgomery	Candor	44.0	70.8		44	NC 211 – Candor, Pinehurst	
Montgomery	Biscoe	49.0	78.9		49	NC 24 / NC 27 – Biscoe, Carthage, Troy	
Montgomery	Star	52.2	84.0		52	Spies Road – Star, Robbins	
Montgomery	Ether	55.3	89.0	39	56	US 220 Alt. – Ether, Steeds	
Randolph		58.0	93.3	41	58	Black Ankle Road	
Randolph	Seagrove	61.3	98.7	45	61	NC 705 – Seagrove, Robbins	
Randolph		65.4	105.3	49	66	New Hope Church Road	To North Carolina Zoo
Randolph		67.6	108.8	51	68	US 220 Bus. north / NC 134 south – Ulah, Troy	To US 220 Alt
Randolph					70	US 64 – Siler City, Lexington	To North Carolina Zoo; Opened in December 2020; Signed as exits 70A (east) and 70B (west). Divided by Collector/distributor roadways
Randolph	Asheboro	71.3	114.7		71	McDowell Road	
Randolph	Asheboro	72.4	116.5		72	US 64 Bus. / NC 49 – Raleigh, Lexington, Charlotte	To North Carolina Zoo; signed as exits 72A (north/east, Raleigh) and 72B (south/west, Lexington, Charlotte)
Randolph	Asheboro	74.0	119.1		74	NC 42 – Asheboro	Left exit; western terminus of NC 42
Randolph	Asheboro	74.8	120.4		75	Presnell Street	
Randolph	Asheboro	75.7	121.8		76	To US 220 Bus. north / North Fayetteville Street / Vision Drive	
Randolph	Asheboro	77.1	124.1		77	Spero Road	
Randolph	Asheboro	78.5	126.3		79	Pineview Street	
Randolph	Randleman	79.5	127.9		80	I-74 west – High Point, Winston-Salem	Western end of I-74 overlap
Randolph	Randleman	80.5	129.6		81	Old US 311 – Randleman	Former southern terminus of US 311; US 311 still signed as of June 2023
Randolph	Randleman	82.2	132.3		82	Academy Street – Randleman	
Randolph	Level Cross	86.3	138.9		86	US 220 Bus. south – Level Cross	To Richard Petty Museum
Guilford		89.0	143.2		89	NC 62 – Climax, High Point	
Guilford		93.6	150.6	77	94	Old Randleman Road	
Guilford	Greensboro	95.0	152.9	78A	95A	I-85 north / US 421 – Durham/Raleigh	I-85 exit 122B
Guilford	Greensboro	95.0	152.9		—	US 220 north	Northern end of US 220 and southern end of US 421 overlap; US 220 exit 95B
Guilford	Greensboro	95.0	152.9		—	I-85 / US 421 south to I-40 east – Durham/Raleigh, Sanford	Southern end of US 421 overlap; US 421 exit 95; I-85 exit 121
Guilford	Greensboro	96.9	155.9	219	97A	US 29 north – Greensboro	Southbound exit and northbound entrance; US 29 exit 33B; former US 70 east
Guilford	Greensboro	97.0	156.1	218	97B	I-85 south / US 29 south – High Point, Charlotte	Southbound exits and northbound entrance; I-85 exit 120B; former US 70 west
Guilford	Greensboro	97.0	156.1	218	97C	Groometown Road to Grandover Parkway	Signed as exit 122A northbound; no access from US 421 northbound
Guilford	Greensboro	100.2	161.3		100	Gate City Boulevard	DDI
Guilford	Greensboro	102.5	165.0	214	102	US 70 (Wendover Avenue)	To Guilford College Road
Guilford	Greensboro	103.6	166.7	1	103	I-40 / I-840 begin / US 421 north – Greensboro, Winston-Salem	Signed as Exits 103A (east) and 103B (west). Western end of I-840 and northern end of US 421 overlap; northbound exit left.
Guilford	Greensboro	105.3	169.5	2	104	West Friendly Avenue	
Guilford	Greensboro	107.3	172.7	3	107	I-840 east / Bryan Boulevard – Downtown Greensboro	Signed as Exits 107A (Bryan Blvd) and 107B (I-73 N/I-840 E). Eastern end of I-840 overlap. Exits 3A-B on I-840
Guilford	Greensboro	109.0	175.4		109	Old Oak Ridge Road – PTI-GSO Airport	Signed as Exits 109A (Old Oak Ridge Road) and 109B (PTI-GSO Airport) northbound. Signed as Exit 109 southbound.
Guilford	Greensboro	110.0	177.0		110	NC 68 south – High Point	
Guilford	Greensboro	111.0	178.6		111	NC 68 north – Oak Ridge	
Guilford	Summerfield	116.8	188.0		117	NC 150 – Summerfield, Oak Ridge	
Guilford	Summerfield				119	US 220 south – Summerfield, Greensboro	Southern end of US 220 overlap; northbound exit and southbound entrance
Guilford	Stokesdale				120	US 158 – Stokesdale, Reidsville	
Rockingham					122	NC 65 – Stokesdale, Reidsville	
Rockingham					123	NC 68 south – Stokesdale	Current northern end of I-73; continuation as US 220; no access to NC 68 southbound / from NC 68 northbound
Rockingham	Madison					US 311 south / US 220 Bus. north / NC 704 – Madison, Wentworth	Existing interchanges on US 220 (upgrade to Interstate standards, unfunded)
Rockingham	Mayodan					US 311 north / NC 135 – Mayodan, Eden	Existing interchanges on US 220 (upgrade to Interstate standards, unfunded)
Rockingham						US 220 Bus. south – Stoneville	Existing interchanges on US 220 (upgrade to Interstate standards, unfunded)
Rockingham	Stoneville					NC 770 – Stoneville, Eden	Existing interchanges on US 220 (upgrade to Interstate standards, unfunded)
Rockingham	Price					I-73 north / US 220 north – Martinsville	Possible future continuation into Virginia
1.000 mi = 1.609 km; 1.000 km = 0.621 mi: Concurrency terminus; Incomplete access; Unopened

== See also ==
Interstate 73
Previous state: South Carolina	North Carolina	Next state: Virginia
