= U.S. Route 220 in North Carolina =

Highway in North Carolina

U.S. Highway 220
- US 220 highlighted in red

Route information
- Maintained by NCDOT
- Length: 123.4 mi (198.6 km)
- Existed: 1935–present

Major junctions
- South end: US 1 in Rockingham
- I-73 / I-74 near Ellerbe; I-73 / I-74 / US 220 Alt. near Candor; US 64 in Asheboro; I-74 in Randleman; I-73 / I-85 / US 421 in Greensboro; I-40 / US 29 / US 70 in Greensboro; US 29 / US 70 in Greensboro; I-73 in Summerfield; US 158 in Stokesdale; US 311 / US 220 Bus. / NC 704 in Madison
- North end: US 220 at the Virginia state line in Price

Location
- Country: United States
- State: North Carolina
- Counties: Richmond, Montgomery, Randolph, Guilford, Rockingham

Highway system
- United States Numbered Highway System; List; Special; Divided; North Carolina Highway System; Interstate; US; State; Scenic
← NC 218	→ US 221

U.S. Route 220 (US 220) is a north–south U.S. highway which travels from Rockingham, North Carolina, to South Waverly, Pennsylvania. In the U.S. state of North Carolina, US 220 travels 123.4 miles (198.6 km) from an intersection with US 1 in Rockingham to the Virginia state line near Price, North Carolina. The highway is an important north–south route in Central North Carolina, connecting Rockingham, Asheboro, Greensboro, and Summerfield. US 220 runs concurrently with Interstate 73 from north of Rockingham to Greensboro, and from Summerfield to Stokesdale; while US 220 runs concurrently with I-74 from Rockingham to Randleman.

== Route description ==
=== Richmond County ===
US 220 northbound past US 74 Bus. in Rockingham

US 220 begins at an intersection with US 1 southwest of downtown Rockingham. From its southern terminus, US 220 travels north along a four-lane divided highway. It interchanges with Midway Road before crossing over a railroad owned by CSX Transportation. Immediately north of the bridge, US 220 intersects US 74 Business (Broad Avenue) and runs west of downtown Rockingham. The highway makes a gradual turn to the northwest, crosses Little Carr Creek, and exits Rockingham to the north. US 220 continues through a suburban area of Richmond County, with a mixture of forested areas and neighborhoods along the highway. North of Rockingham, US 220 travels through a trumpet interchange north of Rockingham. The interchange marks the beginning of a four-lane freeway portion of US 220 which continues for 2.7 miles (4.3 km). US 220 exits the freeway at exit 25, a diamond interchange south of Ellerbe and turns to the north along a two-lane undivided highway. The southern terminus of I-73 and the eastern terminus of the Central North Carolina segment of I-74 are located at the interchange, and both Interstates follow the freeway north.

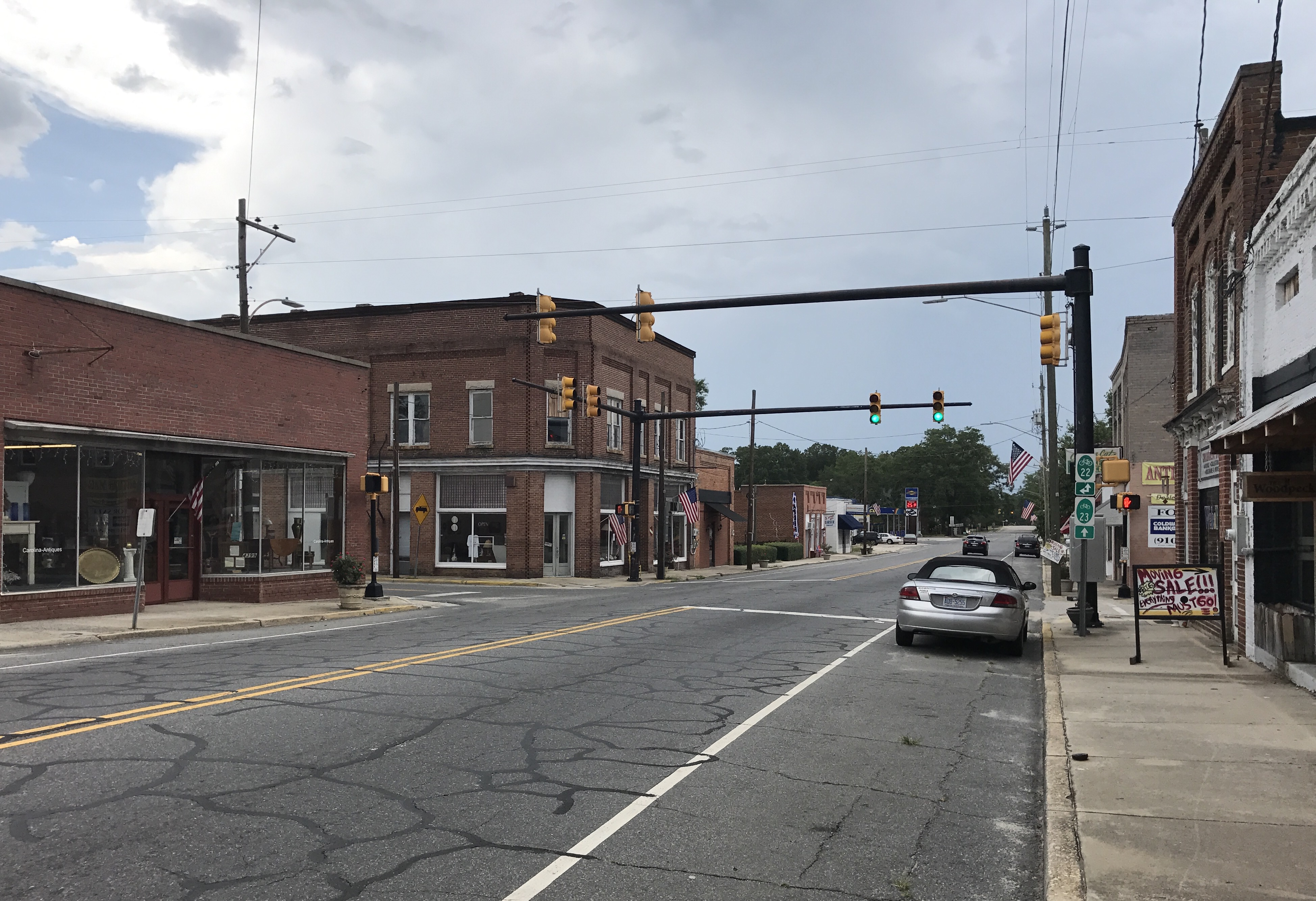
US 220 travelling through Ellerbe.

Entering Ellerbe to the south along Main Street, US 220 travels through the downtown area of Ellerbe. North of downtown, US 220 diverges slightly to the northwest at an intersection with East Main Street. As it exits Ellerbe, US 220 travels adjacent to residential homes and some sporadic businesses. US 220 intersects NC 73 north of Ellerbe. The intersection marks the southern end of a concurrency between US 220 and NC 73, as the highways travel north along a rural two-lane highway. NC 73 diverges from US 220 south of Mineral Springs, and approximately 2,000 feet (610 m) west an interchange with I-73 and I-74. From the intersection, US 220 makes a sweeping turn to the northwest. It parallels I-73 and I-74 for approximately 1.5 miles (2.4 km) until completing its northwesterly turn and entering into Norman. US 220 travels through central Norman on McLeon Avenue and intersects Moore Street in the center of the town. Exiting Norman to the northwest, US 220 leaves Richmond County and enters into Montgomery County.

=== Montgomery County ===
Upon entering Montgomery County, US 220 makes a turn to the north and once again begins to parallel I-73 and I-74. US 220 crosses over I-73 and I-74 south of Emery, and continues to parallel I-73 and I-74 on the eastern side of the Interstates. Approaching Emery, US 220 makes a turn to the northwest, largely running south of the community. US 220 runs briefly to the northwest before meeting I-73 and I-74 along with the southern terminus of US 220 Alternate at a diamond interchange. US 220 turns to merge onto the freeway and run concurrently with I-73 and I-74 to the north. US 220 Alternate largely parallels US 220, I-73, and I-74 on the western side of US 220.

US 220, I-73, and I-74 travel to the north, bypassing the town of Candor along its eastern edge. The highways have an interchange with NC 211 east of downtown Candor. North of the interchange, the freeway turns slightly to the northwest and approaches Biscoe to the southeast, where it turns north and bypasses the town to the east. An interchange with NC 24 and NC 27 is located east of downtown Biscoe. Continuing north, US 220, I-73, and I-74 bypass the town of Star to the east. An interchange with US 220 Alternate is located south of Steeds, and US 220 Alternate begins to parallel US 220 to the east. Near Steeds, US 220, I-73, and I-74 begin to parallel the Little River, a tributary of the Pee Dee River. US 220, I-73, and I-74 exit Montgomery County southwest of Seagrove and enter into Randolph County.

=== Randolph County ===
Entering into rural southern Randolph County, I-73, I-74, and US 220 makes a slight turn to the northwest to bypass Seagrove to the east. An interchange with NC 705 is located to the west of downtown Seagrove. Travelling north, much of the adjacent landscape is forested land mixed with some residential neighborhoods which branch of from adjacent roadways. I-73, I-74, and US 220 also largely parallel US 220 Alternate north of Seagrove. The highways interchange with US 220 Business at exit 68 south of Ulah, which marks the southern terminus of US 220 Business. The northern terminus of US 220 Alternate is located immediately east of the interchange at an intersection with US 220 Business. I-73, I-74, and US 220 bypass Ulah to the west. A cloverleaf interchange with US 64 is located to the northwest of Ulah.

I-73, I-74, and US 220 north, approaching Asheboro from the south. A diamond interchange with McDowell Road is located southwest of downtown Asheboro. The highways run adjacent to Randolph Community College and several government buildings which are located off the McDowell Road exit. Continuing north, the highway has an interchange with US 64 Business and NC 49 (Dixie Drive) and Albemarle Drive in a commercial district of Asheboro. North of US 64 Business and NC 49, I-73, I-74, and US 220 travel through a mixed residential and industrial section of Asheboro. Further north, the highway median widens for an interchange with NC 42 (Salisbury Street) and Lexington Road, with accelerating and decelerating lanes in the median of the freeway. Numerous commercial businesses and residential homes are located adjacent to I-73, I-74, and US 220 near the interchange. Another diamond interchange with Presnell Street is located 0.4 miles (0.64 km) north of the Salisbury Street and Lexington Road interchange. From the Presnell Street interchange, the highway begins to travel away from downtown Asheboro but largely runs west of the city limits. As it travels north, the landscape transforms into a mixture of residential neighborhoods and forested land. A trumpet interchange with Vision Drive is located approximately 0.6 miles (0.97 km) north of the Presnell Street interchange. Two more diamond interchanges with Spero Road and Pineview Road are located to the west of Asheboro. A quarry and several industrial businesses are located adjacent to the highway near the Pineview Road interchange.

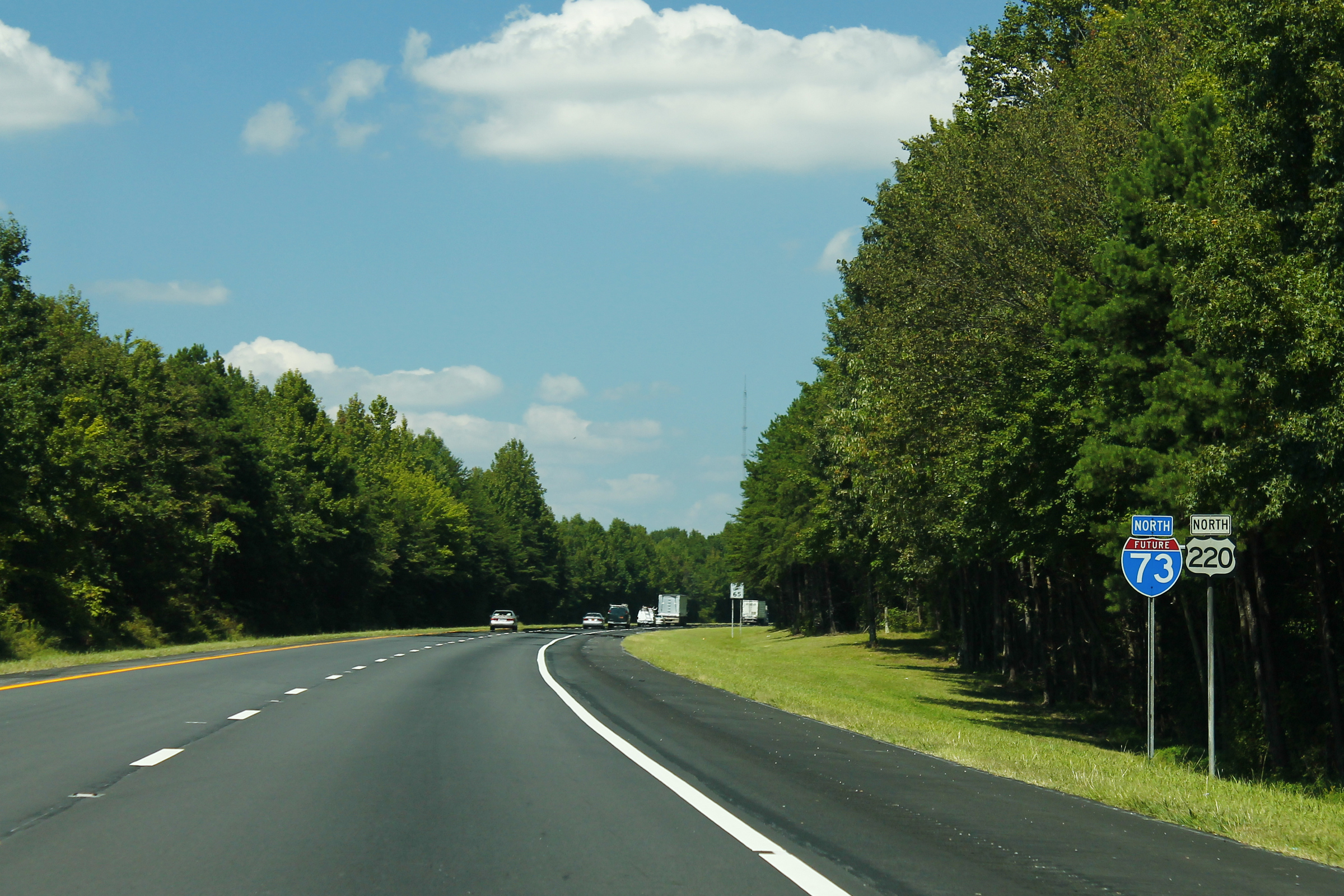
I-73 and US 220 travelling concurrently in Randolph County.

Approximately 0.5 miles (0.80 km) north of the Pineview Road interchange, I-73 and US 220 interchange with I-74, which diverges to the northwest toward High Point. I-73 and US 220 continue concurrently to the north along a four-lane freeway. The highway begins to travel around the western side of Randleman, and a partial cloverleaf interchange with a former segment of US 311 is located to the southwest of downtown Randleman. Immediately north of the interchange, I-73 and US 220 cross underneath a railroad owned by the Norfolk Southern Railway. I-73 and US 220 interchange with Academy Street west of downtown Randleman, and several commercial businesses are located off of the exit. The highway makes a sweeping curve to the northwest as it travels north of the interchange and enters into a rural area of Randolph County. It utilizes a partial causeway and bridge to cross Randleman Lake immediately following the curve. North of the lake crossing, I-73 and US 220 travel north, parallel with the lakeshore. An interchange with US 220 Business is located southwest of Level Cross. The highway then bypasses the community to the west and crosses into Guilford County approximately 2.0 miles (3.2 km) north of the US 220 Business interchange.

=== Guilford County ===
Entering into Guilford County, the highway increasingly travels through suburban regions south of Greensboro. A diamond interchange with NC 62 is located 0.7 miles (1.1 km) north of the Randolph County - Guilford County line. US 220 continues north concurrently with I-73 for 4.5 miles (7.2 km) before interchanging with Old Randleman Road at a diamond interchange. From the interchange the highways continue north for 1.1 miles (1.8 km) before reaching an interchange with I-85 and US 421 (Greensboro Urban Loop). At the interchange, I-73 breaks from its concurrency with US 220, following the Greensboro Urban Loop to the west. US 220 continues to the north, travelling through an urbanized region of southern Greensboro. It interchanges with US 29, 1.1 miles (1.8 km) north of the Greensboro Urban Loop, at an incomplete cloverleaf interchange. US 220 travels north along the freeway, crossing over Vandalia Road, before making a slight turn to the northwest and interchanging with Creek Ridge Road at a partial cloverleaf interchange. The freeway widens from four travel lanes south of the Creek Ridge Road interchange to six travel lanes north of the interchange. US 220 continues travelling north-northwest along the freeway for 0.3 miles (0.48 km) before meeting I-40 at an interchange, where it follows I-40 to the east. The roadway continues north as a surface street known as Freeman Mill Road.

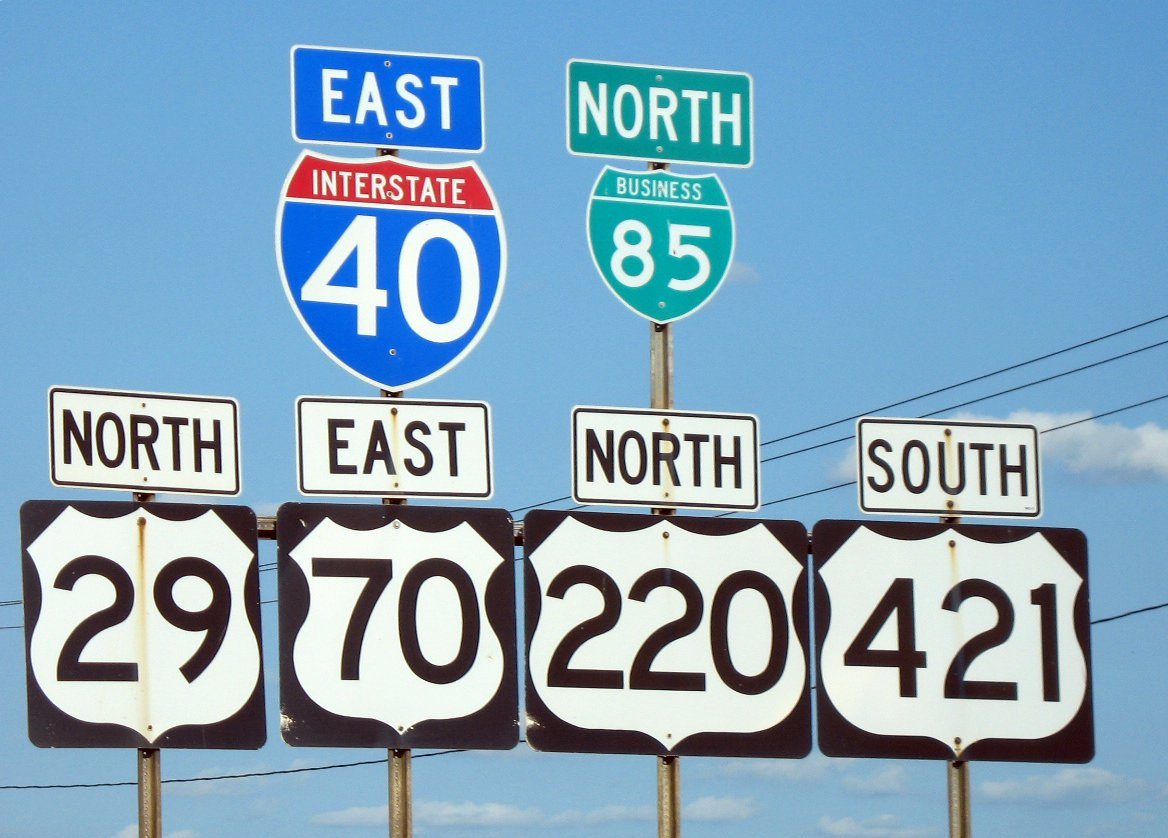
I-40, I-85 Business, US 29, US 70, US 220, and US 421 running concurrently in Greensboro. US 421 ran concurrently with US 220 until 2008.

Zero point three miles (0.48 km) east of the I-40 and US 220 interchange, US 29 joins I-40 and US 220 along a concurrency to the east. Interchanges with Randleman Road and Elm-Eugene Street are located immediately east of the US 29 interchange. The highway travels through an industrial region of Greensboro before interchanging with Martin Luther King Jr. Drive and O'Henry Boulevard. US 29 and US 220 diverge from I-40 at O'Henry Blvd and following the road to the north. O'Henry Boulevard serves as an urban freeway, travelling through a residential area of Greensboro. A quadrant interchange provides access to Gate City Boulevard. The highways travel underneath a railroad owned and operated by the North Carolina Railroad, before interchanging with Market Street at a partial cloverleaf interchange. North of the interchange, US 29 and US 220 travel along the eastern side of North Carolina A&T State University. Access to and from Lutheran Street and Sullivan Street is provided to the northbound travel lanes only. A quadrant interchange with Bessemer Avenue is located at the northeastern corner of the North Carolina A&T State University campus near Truist Stadium. US 29 and US 220 interchange with US 70 (Wendover Avenue) immediately north of the Bessemer Avenue interchange. The US 29 and US 220 concurrency ends at the interchange as US 220 turns to follow US 70 (Wendover Avenue) to the west, and US 29 continues north along O'Henry Boulevard.

US 220 northbound concurrent with I-40 eastbound/US 29 northbound in Greensboro

Following Wendover Avenue to the west, US 220 encounters multiple commercial business which line the roadway in the vicinity of the O'Henry Boulevard interchange and there are multiple at grade intersections. It interchanges with Summit Avenue and Yanceyville Street before passing south of the Moses H. Cone Memorial Hospital and across Elm Street utilizing an overpass. Continuing west along Wendover Avenue, the highway travels through a commercial area before crossing North Buffalo Creek and entering a residential area. US 220 continues west of the creek for 0.6 miles (0.97 km) until ending its US 70 concurrency and diverging northeast onto Battleground Avenue at an interchange. Utilizing Battleground Avenue, US 220 travels northeast through a commercial region of northeastern Greensboro. It parallels a former railroad line of the Atlantic and Yadkin Railway to the east for approximately 0.3 miles (0.48 km) between Pembroke Road and Lawndale Drive. At the Lawndale Drive intersection, Battleground Avenue moves in an s-shaped pattern to cross the railroad line and parallels the railroad line to the west.

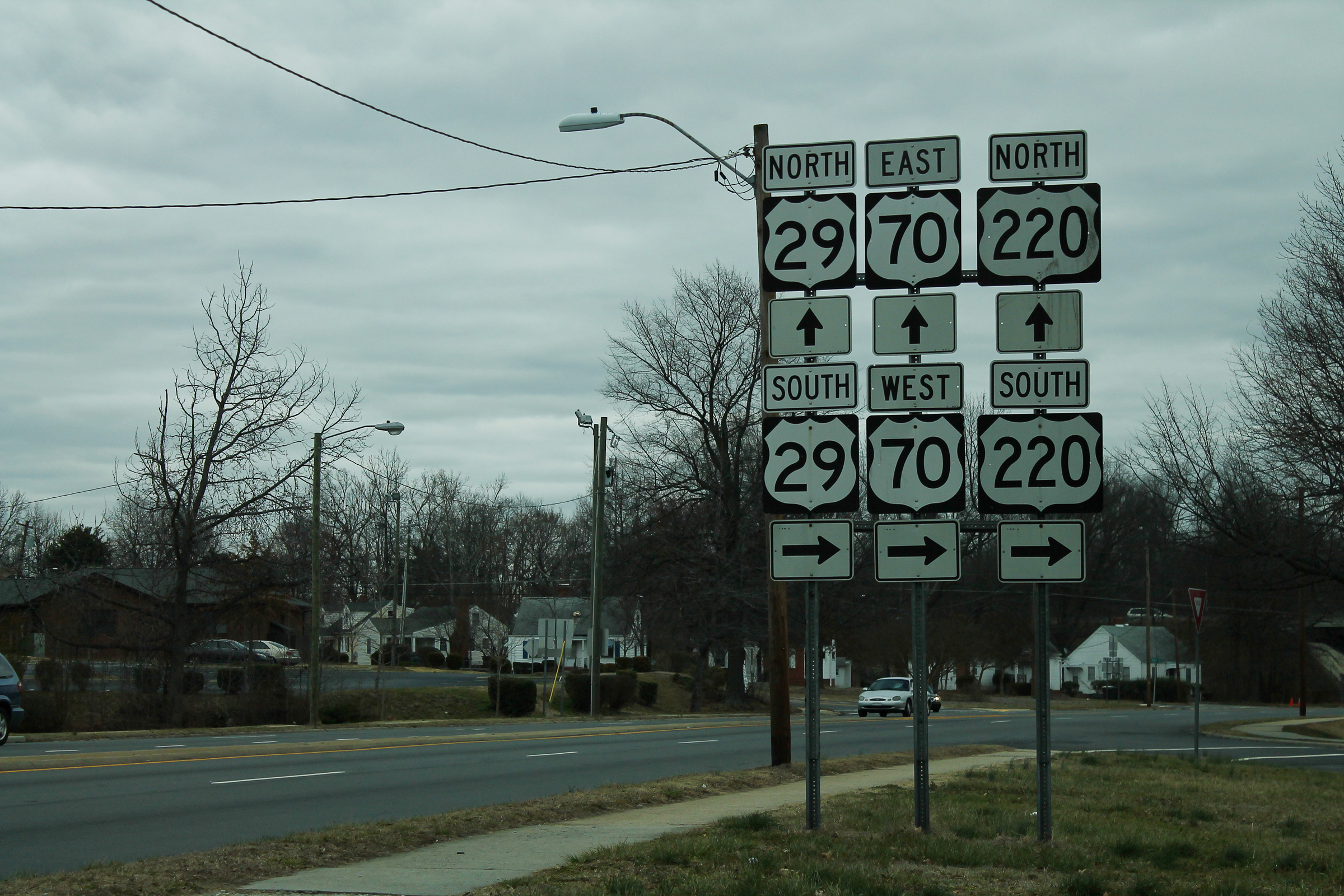
Signage for US 29, US 70, and US 220 in Greensboro.

From there, US 220 continues northwest along Battleground Avenue with major intersections at Cone Boulevard, Martinsville Road, and Pisgah Church Road. Retail business are dominant along Battleground Avenue south of Pisgah Church Road. As US 220 moves north of the Pisgah Church Road intersection, the region becomes more residential with retail businesses and shopping centers located near major intersections. US 220 meets I-840 at a single-point urban interchange (I-840 exit 6). Continuing north along Battleground Avenue, US 220 continues through a residential area on the south side of Lake Brandt. US 220 crosses Lake Brandt along a partial causeway and bridge. North of the lake, US 220 continues through a residential area until reaching NC 150 south of Summerfield. US 220 and NC 150 run concurrently to the northwest, largely bypassing Summerfield to the east. North of Summerfield, US 220 and NC 150 intersect Scalesville Road. At the intersection, NC 150 turns to the west, ending the concurrency. US 220 continues northwest for 1.3 miles (2.1 km) before meeting I-73 at an incomplete interchange, with a northbound freeway entrance and a southbound exit. At the interchange, US 220 merges onto I-73, marking the southern end of the second concurrency with I-73. I-73 and US 220 interchange with US 158 at exit 120, a diamond interchange east of Stokesdale. From there, the highways travel north for approximately 1/2 mile (0.80 km) until leaving Guilford County and entering Rockingham County.

=== Rockingham County ===
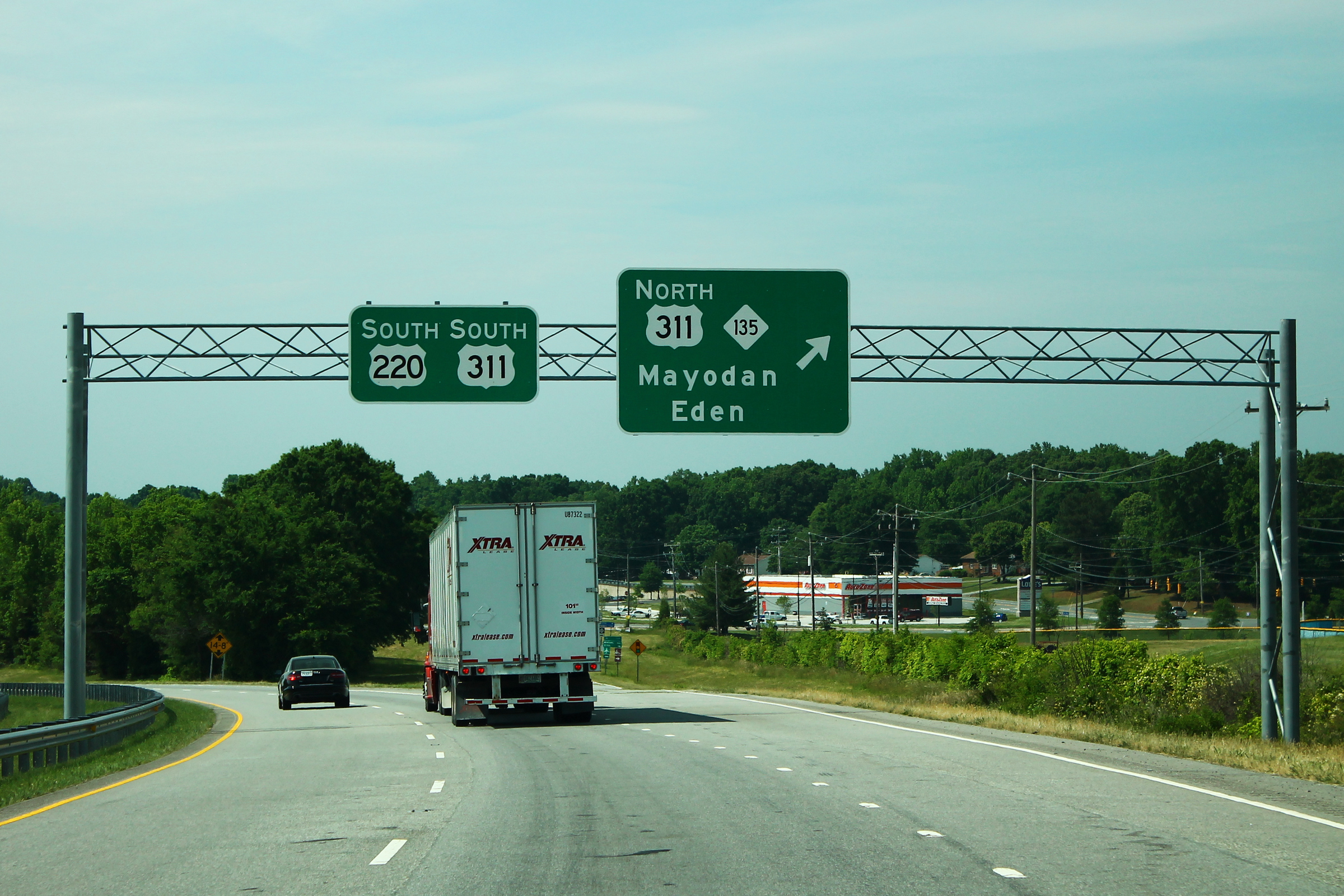
Signage along US 220 South for the US 311 and NC 135 interchange northeast of Mayodan.

Continuing north into Rockingham County, I-73 and US 220 travel for approximately 1 mile (1.6 km) before meeting NC 65 at a diamond interchange, exit 122. Beyond the interchange, I-73 and US 220 travel concurrently for 1.5 miles (2.4 km) before meeting the northern terminus of NC 68 an incomplete interchange. The interchange also marks the northern terminus of I-73 and the freeway ends. US 220 continues north along a four lane expressway, with Price Farm Road and Newnam Road being the first at-grade intersection since meeting I-73 north of Summerfield. The highway continues through a rural region of southern Rockingham County and the landscape consists of forested regions and farmland with sporadic businesses located off the highway. Approaching Madison, US 220 crosses over Hogan Creek and intersects Ellisboro Road at an at-grade intersection. US 220 largely becomes a freeway north of the intersection, although an occasional driveway is connected to the highway. Using the freeway, US 220 stays to the east of Madison. Although, it briefly enters the city limits at an interchange with US 311, NC 704, and the southern terminus of US 220 Business. From the interchange, US 311 begins running concurrently with US 220 to the north for 2.5 miles (4.0 km), crossing the Dan River east of downtown Madison. The concurrency ends at a diamond interchange with US 311 and NC 135 east of Mayodan. The freeway largely ends at the interchange as several at-grade intersections exist north of the US 311 and NC 135 interchange.

US 220 continues north toward Stoneville, crossing over a railroad owned and operated by Norfolk Southern Railway, before interchanging with the northern terminus of US 220 Business at a diamond interchange southwest of the town. US 220 stays west of Stoneville, interchanging with NC 770 west of the core area of town. As it continues north of Stoneville, US 220 primarily travels through a forested region with some sporadic farmland. An interchange with Smith Road is located 2.4 miles (3.9 km) north of NC 770 and US 220 begins to run parallel to its former alignment and the Norfolk Southern railroad it crossed southwest of Stoneville. As the highway approaches Virginia, it intersects its former alignment and crosses under the Norfolk Southern railroad north of the intersection. The highway then begins to make a turn to the northeast which it completes in Virginia. A final at-grade intersection with Martinsville Loop is located 0.2 miles (0.32 km) south of the North Carolina-Virginia state line. US 220 then enters into Virginia, continuing north-northeast toward Ridgeway and Martinsville.

=== Dedicated and memorial names ===
US 220 in North Carolina feature a few dedicated or memorialized stretches of freeway.

- Governor John Motley Morehead Expressway – official North Carolina name of US 220 from the south Greensboro city limits to Interstate 40 (approved: April 12, 1996).
- J. Elsie Webb Thoroughfare – official North Carolina name of US 220 from US 1, in Rockingham, to Ellerbe (approved: February 3, 1972).
- Martha McGee Bell Bridges – official North Carolina name of US 220's twin bridges over the Deep River, near Randleman (approved: August 11, 1978).
- Rush C. Collins Bridge – official North Carolina name of US 220's bridge over the Dan River (approved: October 2, 1969).
- Thomas A. Burton Highway – official North Carolina name of US 220 from NC 68 to the Virginia state line (approved: March 4, 1994).

== History ==
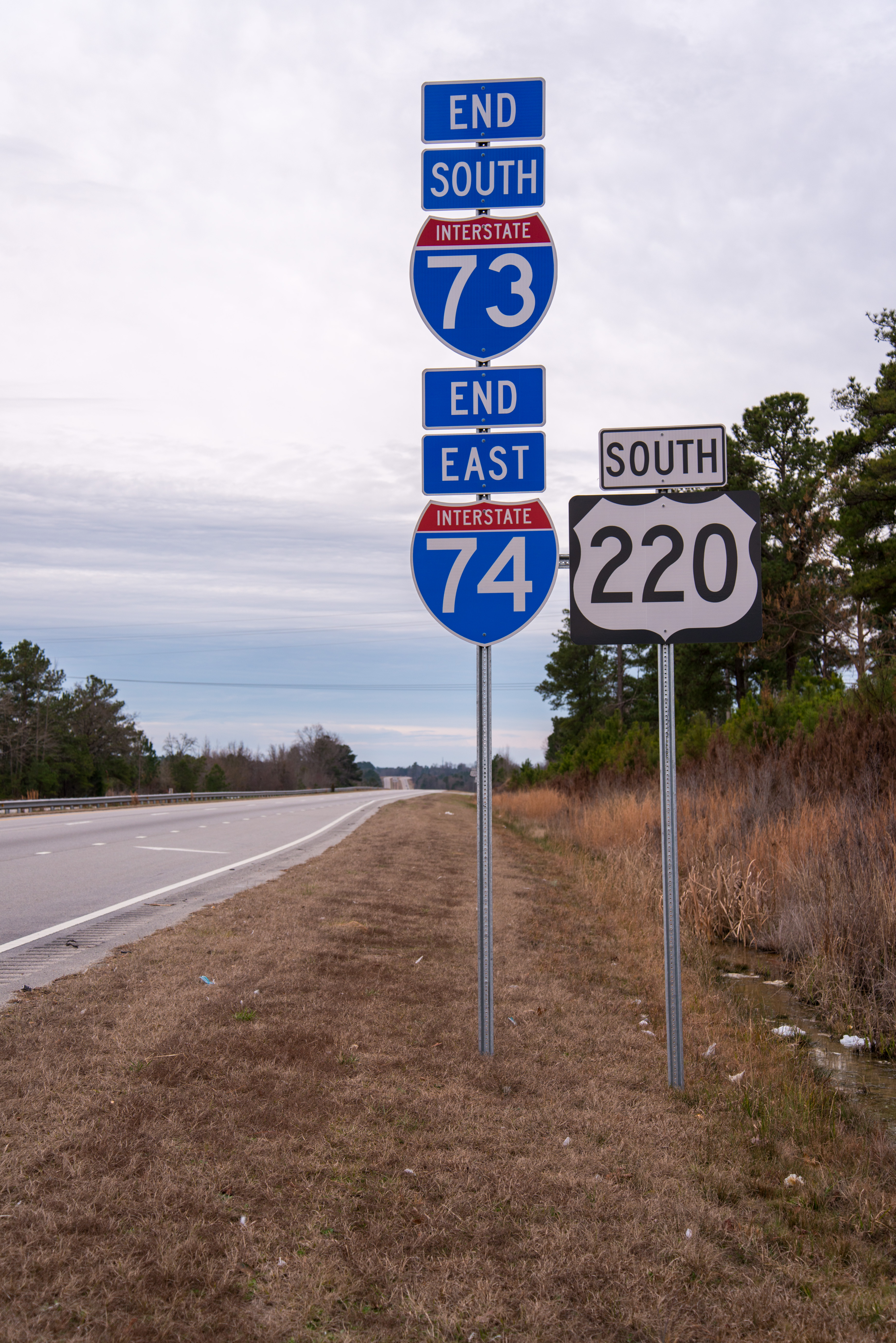
Former end of the Central North Carolina segment of I-73 and I-74 along US 220 South near Ellerbe

Established in 1935 when US 220 was extended south from Virginia; it replaced: US 311/NC 77 from the state line to Madison, US 411/NC 704 from Madison to Greensboro, US 411/NC 70 from Greensboro to Candor, US 411/NC 170 from Candor to Norman, and US 15/NC 75 from Norman to Rockingham.

By 1939, US 220 was realigned west of Seagrove, leaving Old US Highway 220 and an extension of NC 705. By 1963, US 220 bypassed Madison and Mayodan, the old route through the towns became US 220 Business. Between 1964 and 1966, Stoneville was bypassed to its west. Between 1967 and 1968, US 220 was realigned west, onto new freeway, of Asheboro, leaving US 220 Business. In 1970, US 220 was rerouted in Greensboro; from Randleman Road it overlapped with Interstate 85 then onto O. Henry Boulevard (in concurrency with US 29) going north till Wendover Avenue, then west to Battleground Avenue; the original alignment through downtown Greensboro became unnumbered.

In the 1970s, US 220 was continuously moved onto new freeway, bypassing Randleman and Level Cross. Also, at some point during the decade, US 220 was extended south to its current terminus with US 1, leaving behind Ellerbe Road in Rockingham.

In 1980, US 220 was moved onto new freeway between Steeds and Emery, its old alignment became US 220 Alternate. Between 1981 and 1983, US 220 moved onto new freeway from Level Cross to Interstate 85, leaving an unnumbered Randleman Road.

In 1995, US 220 was moved onto new freeway between Interstate 85 to Interstate 40. In May 1997, US 220 was moved onto new freeway between Ether and NC 134; it not only extended US 220 Alternate over the old alignment, but also became the first section of both Interstate 73 and Interstate 74.

On January 7, 2008, US 220 was moved onto new freeway between Emery to south of Ellerbe, leaving its old alignment another extension of US 220 Alternate.

=== U.S. Route 411 ===
U.S. Highway 411
- Location: Rockingham–Madison, NC
- Length: 112.3 mi (180.7 km)
- Existed: 1932–1935

U.S. Route 411 (US 411) was established in 1932 as the second national US 411, traversed entirely in North Carolina. Starting on Washington Street, in Rockingham, it traveled with US 74 to Ellerbe Road then north through Ellerbe, Norman, Candor, Biscoe, Star, and Seagrove, mostly along what is today US 220 Bus and US 220 Alt. In Asheboro, it went along Fayetteville Street, then continued north on Randleman Road and on Old Randleman Road into Greensboro. Through Greensboro, US 411 was routed along Randleman Road, O'Connor Street, Elm Street, and Battleground Road; in 1934, it was rerouted north of Elm Street to Wendover Avenue, Winstead Place, Northwood Street, and Battleground Road. Going northwest, it continued to Madison, where it ended at US 311. In 1935, US 411 was renumbered as "US 220".

== Future ==
The Western Rockingham Bypass, from the US 74/US 74 Bus. interchange to US 220 Alt near Ellerbe. Currently all right-of-way purchases have been completed along the proposed route, with construction beginning in 2012 on upgrading US 220 north of Rockingham. The remaining sections of the new bypass is currently scheduled to begin construction in late 2017; however, it is subject to reprioritization.

US 220 will be widened in the northern part of Greensboro (called "Battleground Avenue" at this point) to multi-lanes, from Horse Pen Creek Road, in Greensboro, to Winfree Road, in Summerfield. With construction expected to be completed in December 2016, these plans have been funded.

== Junction list ==
County	Location	mi	km	Old exit	New exit	Destinations	Notes
Richmond	Rockingham	0.0	0.0			US 1 south – Cheraw	Southbound exit and northbound entrance
Richmond	Rockingham	0.5	0.80			Midway Road	
Richmond	Rockingham	0.8	1.3			US 74 Bus. (Broad Avenue) – Wadesboro, Hamlet	
Richmond					22	I-73 south / I-74 east to US 74 – Lumberton	South end of I-73 and east end of I-74 overlap; opened January 28, 2025
Richmond					23	Dockery Road / Haywood Cemetery Road	
Richmond		8.4	13.5	8	25	I-73 north / I-74 west – Asheboro	North end of I-73 and west end of I-74 overlap
Richmond	Ellerbe	11.8	19.0			NC 73 west – Mount Gilead	West end of NC 73 overlap
Richmond		16.5	26.6			NC 73 east – West End	East end of NC 73 overlap
Richmond	Norman	18.4	29.6			Moore Street	
Montgomery		22.5	36.2			Tabernacle Church Road	
Montgomery	Emery	24.5	39.4	24	41	I-73 south / I-74 east / US 220 Alt. north – Rockingham, Candor	South end of I-73 and east end of I-74 overlap
Montgomery	Candor	27.5	44.3		44	NC 211 – Candor, Pinehurst	
Montgomery	Biscoe	32.5	52.3		49	NC 24 / NC 27 – Biscoe, Carthage, Troy	
Montgomery	Star	35.8	57.6		52	Spies Road – Star, Robbins	
Montgomery	Ether	38.9	62.6	39	56	US 220 Alt. – Ether, Steeds	
Randolph		41.5	66.8	41	58	Black Ankle Road	
Randolph	Seagrove	45.0	72.4	45	61	NC 705 – Seagrove, Robbins	
Randolph		49.1	79.0	49	66	New Hope Church Road	To North Carolina Zoo
Randolph		51.3	82.6	51	68	US 220 Bus. north / NC 134 south – Ulah, Troy	To US 220 Alt
Randolph		53.5	86.1		70; A-B	A: US 64 east – Siler City; B: US 64 west – Lexington	Exit 344 A-B (US 64); Cloverleaf interchange
Randolph	Asheboro	54.9	88.4		71	McDowell Road	
Randolph	Asheboro	56.0	90.1		72; A-B	A: US 64 Bus. east / NC 49 north – Raleigh B: US 64 Bus. west / NC 49 south – Lexington, Charlotte	To North Carolina Zoo
Randolph	Asheboro	57.6	92.7		74	NC 42 – Asheboro	Left exit; western terminus of NC 42
Randolph	Asheboro	58.4	94.0		75	Presnell Street	
Randolph	Asheboro	59.2	95.3		76	To US 220 Bus. north / North Fayetteville Street / Vision Drive	
Randolph	Asheboro	60.7	97.7		77	Spero Road	
Randolph	Asheboro	62.0	99.8		78	Pineview Street	
Randolph	Randleman	63.0	101.4		80	I-74 west – High Point, Winston-Salem	West end of I-74 overlap
Randolph	Randleman	64.1	103.2		81	US Highway 311 Extension – Randleman	
Randolph	Randleman	65.8	105.9		82	Academy Street – Randleman	
Randolph	Level Cross	69.8	112.3		86	US 220 Bus. south – Level Cross	
Guilford		72.6	116.8		89	NC 62 – Climax, High Point	
Guilford		77.2	124.2	77	94	Old Randleman Road	
Guilford	Greensboro	78.2	125.9	78	95	I-73 north / I-85 north / US 421 (Greensboro Urban Loop) – Winston-Salem, Durham, Sanford	North end of I-73 overlap; signed as 78A (south) and 78B (north)
Guilford	Greensboro	79.2	127.5		79	US 29 / US 70 to I-85 south – Burlington, High Point, Charlotte	Signed as 79A (north) and 79B (south)
Guilford	Greensboro	80.0	128.7		80	Creek Ridge Road	Southbound signed as 80A (west) and 80B (east)
Guilford	Greensboro	80.6	129.7		81	I-40 west / Freeman Mill Road – Winston-Salem	West end of I-40 overlap
Guilford	Greensboro	81.3	130.8		219	US 29 south / US 70 west – Charlotte	South end of US 29 and west end of US 70 overlap
Guilford	Greensboro	81.6	131.3		220	Randleman Road	
Guilford	Greensboro	82.2	132.3		221	South Elm-Eugene Street – Downtown Greensboro	
Guilford	Greensboro	83.3	134.1		222	Martin Luther King Jr. Drive	
Guilford	Greensboro	83.5	134.4		223	I-40 east – Burlington, Durham, Raleigh	East end of I-40 overlap; westbound exit and eastbound entrance
Guilford	Greensboro	84.0	135.2			Florida Street	Eastbound exit and entrance only
Guilford	Greensboro	84.5	136.0			Gate City Boulevard	Two exits signed east and west
Guilford	Greensboro	85.3	137.3			Market Street	To North Carolina A&T State University
Guilford	Greensboro	85.8	138.1			Sullivan Street	Eastbound exit and entrance only
Guilford	Greensboro	86.0	138.4			Bessemer Street	
Guilford	Greensboro	86.3	138.9			US 29 north / US 70 east (Wendover Avenue) – McLeansville, Burlington	North end of US 29 and east end of US 70 overlaps, two exits signed east and west
Guilford	Greensboro	87.0	140.0			Summit Avenue	
Guilford	Greensboro	87.3	140.5			Yanceyville Street	No southbound exit
Guilford	Greensboro	88.8	142.9			Battleground Avenue / Wendover Avenue	
Guilford	Greensboro	93.5	150.5			I-840 to I-73 / I-785 – Winston-Salem, Raleigh	Exit 6 (I-840); Single-point urban interchange
Guilford	Summerfield	97.8	157.4			NC 150 east – Browns Summit	East end of NC 150 overlap
Guilford	Summerfield	99.0	159.3			NC 150 west – Oak Ridge	West end of NC 150 overlap
Guilford	Summerfield	100.3	161.4			I-73 south – PTI Airport, Asheboro	Exit 119 (I-73); South end of I-73 overlap
Guilford	Stokesdale	102.2	164.5		120	US 158 – Stokesdale, Reidsville	
Rockingham		103.8	167.0		122	NC 65 – Stokesdale, Reidsville	
Rockingham		105.3	169.5		123	I-73 ends / NC 68 south – Stokesdale	Southbound exit and northbound entrance; Northern terminus of I-73 and NC 68; North end of I-73 overlap
Rockingham	Madison	111.3	179.1			US 311 south / US 220 Bus. north / NC 704 – Madison, Wentworth	South end of US 311 overlap
Rockingham	Mayodan	114.3	183.9			US 311 north / NC 135 – Mayodan, Eden	North end of US 311 overlap
Rockingham		116.8	188.0			US 220 Bus. south – Stoneville	
Rockingham	Stoneville	118.0	189.9			NC 770 – Stoneville, Eden	
Rockingham	Price	123.4	198.6			US 220 north – Martinsville	Continuation into Virginia
1.000 mi = 1.609 km; 1.000 km = 0.621 mi: Concurrency terminus; Incomplete access

== See also ==
- Special routes of U.S. Route 220
- Guilford Courthouse National Military Park
- Mayo River State Park
- Uwharrie National Forest

U.S. Route 220
Previous state: Terminus	North Carolina	Next state: Virginia
