= North Carolina Highway 73 =

State highway in North Carolina, US

North Carolina Highway 73

- Map of southern North Carolina with NC 73 highlighted in red

Route information
- Maintained by NCDOT
- Length: 118.5 mi (190.7 km)
- Existed: 1934–present
- Tourist routes: Pee Dee Valley Drive; Sandhills Scenic Drive; Indian Heritage Trail

Major junctions
- West end: NC 27 near Lincolnton
- I-77 near Huntersville; I-85 near Concord; US 52 / NC 24 / NC 27 in Albemarle; I-73 / I-74 north of Ellerbe
- East end: US 15 / US 501 near Pinehurst

Location
- Country: United States
- State: North Carolina
- Counties: Lincoln, Mecklenburg, Cabarrus, Stanly, Montgomery, Richmond, Moore

Highway system
- North Carolina Highway System; Interstate; US; State; Scenic
← I-73	→ I-74

North Carolina Highway 73 (NC 73) is a primary state highway in the U.S. state of North Carolina that travels through south-central North Carolina in the United States. Most of the route is a two-lane highway that passes through both rural scenic areas; however, it also serves several small and moderate-sized cities in the state, including Concord and Albemarle. The western terminus of NC 73 is at an intersection with NC 27 east of Lincolnton and its eastern terminus is at a junction with US 15/US 501 in Eastwood (between Pinehurst and Carthage).

== Route description ==
NC 73 begins at an intersection with NC 27 east of Lincolnton in Lincoln County. It heads eastward, passing to the south of Lincolnton-Lincoln County Regional Airport and intersecting NC 16. It passes into Mecklenburg County upon crossing over the Catawba River just below the Cowans Ford Dam at Lake Norman. The route heads along the lake shore to the vicinity of Huntersville, where it meets I-77 an interchange near the NorthCross development. Past I-77, NC 73 passes through the northern part of Huntersville on its way into Cabarrus County.

Just across the County line, NC 73 crosses the Rocky River and passes through the center of the Odell School community before running along the southern edge of the Coddle Creek reservoir. East of the reservoir, the highway intersects with Kannapolis Parkway and then passes an interchange with I-85 as it enters the city of Concord. The route proceeds through the downtown district, meeting US 601 and NC 3 before leaving Concord. NC 73 passes through the town of Mount Pleasant—where it connects to NC 49 by way of an interchange—before passing into Stanly County.

The highway goes through the crossroads community of Finger on its way to Albemarle. Here, NC 73 avoids the city center by following a four-lane bypass around the southern part of the city that also carries NC 24 and NC 27. All three routes leave the bypass at Albemarle Plaza Mall and head southeastward as a two-lane highway toward the Uwharrie Mountains. The highways enter rural Montgomery County after crossing over the Pee Dee River at Lake Tillery.

NC 73 leaves NC 24 and NC 27 just east of the county line. While the latter two routes pass through Uwharrie National Forest, NC 73 bypasses it to the south, following a southeasterly routing through the community of Pee Dee to the town of Mount Gilead. The highway passes near Town Creek Indian Mound before crossing into Richmond County, where it turns to follow a more easterly routing toward the town of Ellerbe. NC 73 joins US 220 Alternate north of the town and follows it to the vicinity of Norman, where the two highways split just west of an interchange with I-73, I-74, and US 220.

Past the freeway, NC 73 heads northeastward through a small portion of Montgomery County and the community of Windblow on its way into Moore County. Here, it serves Jackson Springs as it progresses toward the town of West End, built up around the junction of NC 73 and NC 211. The two highways overlap for one block through the center of town before splitting and continuing on their separate ways. NC 73 leaves West End and heads generally eastward to Eastwood, a community south of the county seat of Carthage and north of the village of Pinehurst, where it ends at an intersection with US 15/US 501.

== History ==
The portion of modern NC 73 between Concord and Mount Gilead was a state highway as early as 1922. At the time, the remainder of what is now NC 73 was not part of the state highway system. By 1926, the Concord – Mount Gilead highway was designated as part of NC 74, a route that continued east to Sanford by way of modern NC 109, NC 24 and NC 27, and US 15 and US 501. Also assigned by this time was NC 51, which followed modern NC 73 between Mount Gilead and Ellerbe. NC 74 was altered by 1930 to bypass Mount Gilead to the north on what is now SR 1174. The west leg of its former routing became part of NC 515. NC 74 was also extended westward to Caldwell by this time. Meanwhile, NC 75 was rerouted by 1930 to utilize the modern routing of NC 73 between Ellerbe and West End.

In 1934, NC 74 was renumbered to NC 73 to eliminate numerical duplication with the nearby US 74, a route assigned as part of the establishment of the U.S. Highway System in 1926. The new NC 73 began at an intersection with NC 18 in Toluca and proceeded northeastward to Newton on what is now NC 10. From there, it followed modern NC 16 to a junction south of Denver, where it turned to continue east to West End on what had been NC 74, NC 515, NC 51, and NC 75. In the late 1930s, NC 73 was extended to its current eastern terminus at US 15/US 501 north of Pinehurst and truncated on its west end to NC 16 south of Denver.

At some point between 1940 and 1951, the segment of current NC 73 west of Machpelah became part of an extended NC 273, which traveled from its current northern terminus to Machpelah by way of an overlap with NC 16 and Old Plank Road. NC 273 was truncated back to its current northern terminus in the 1960s, at which time its former routing west of Machpelah became an extension of NC 73. In between Machpelah and NC 16, NC 73 was routed along its modern alignment.

=== North Carolina Highway 74 (1921–1934) ===
North Carolina Highway 74
- Location: Denver–Carthage
- Length: 118 mi (190 km)
- Existed: 1921–1934

North Carolina Highway 74 (NC 74) was an original state highway running from Concord, east through Albemarle, Troy and Carthage ending at NC 50 southwest of Sanford. The highway's routing appeared on the 1916 Highway Map by the North Carolina State Highway Commission for the five year federal aid program. However NC 74 was not officially marked on any state highway maps until 1924; where it was routed from NC 15 in Concord east to Albemarle where the highway met NC 27 and NC 80. From there the highway turned further to the southeast, crossing the Yadkin River and intersecting NC 51 in Wadeville. The highway then turned northeast to follow a paved road to Troy. In Troy NC 74 turned east to follow along a gravel road to Carthage. The highway turned northeast in Carthage, following along a gravel road until intersecting NC 50 southwest of Sanford. Between 1926 and 1930, the entirety of NC 74 was converted to a hard surface road. During the time NC 74 was truncated to Carthage, with NC 75 replacing the highway between Carthage and US 1/NC 50. However NC 74 was extended 2 miles (3.2 km) north concurrently with US 170/NC 15, and then extended west along its own routing to US 21/NC 26. From 1930 to 1931, NC 74 was closed between US 311/NC 70 in Biscoe and US 15/NC 75 in Carthage. Between 1931 and 1933, NC 74 was placed concurrently along US 21/NC 26 for 2 miles to the north, and then placed along new routing from Cornelius to NC 271 south of Denver. In 1934, NC 74 was eliminated. The routing between NC 271 and Albemarle was renumbered as NC 73. NC 27 and NC 73 were dual signed along the section between Albemarle and Wadeville. NC 27 was signed along the remainder of the routing to Carthage.

Browse numbered routes
← I-74	→ NC 75

== Major intersections ==
County	Location	mi	km	Destinations	Notes
Lincoln	Boger City	0.0	0.0	NC 27 – Lincolnton, Stanley	
Lincoln	Lowesville	10.8	17.4	NC 16 – Charlotte, Newton	Partial cloverleaf interchange
Lincoln	Lowesville	11.5	18.5	NC 16 Bus.	
Mecklenburg	Huntersville	19.7	31.7	I-77 – Charlotte, Statesville	Diamond interchange, exit 25
Mecklenburg	Huntersville	20.0	32.2	US 21 (Statesville Road) – Charlotte, Cornelius	
Mecklenburg	Huntersville	21.2	34.1	NC 115 (Old Statesville Road) – Charlotte, Davidson	
Cabarrus	Concord	32.2	51.8	I-85 south – Charlotte I-85 north – Greensboro	Diverging diamond interchange; I 85 exit 55
Cabarrus	Concord	35.2	56.6	US 29 south / US 601 south (Concord Parkway) – Charlotte, Midland	South end of US 29/US 601 overlap
Cabarrus	Concord	35.5	57.1	US 29 north / US 601 north (Concord Parkway) – Kannapolis, Salisbury	North end of US 29/US 601 overlap
Cabarrus	Concord	38.3	61.6	NC 3 (Branchview Drive) – Kannapolis	
Cabarrus	Mount Pleasant	45.3	72.9	NC 49 – Harrisburg, Richfield	Diamond interchange
Stanly	Albemarle	60.4	97.2	US 52 north – Salisbury	North end of US 52 overlap
Stanly	Albemarle	61.3	98.7	US 52 south (Aquadale Road) / NC 24 / NC 27 west (Spaulding Street) – Wadesboro, Charlotte	South end of US 52 and west end of NC 24/27 overlap
Stanly	Albemarle	61.5	99.0	US 52 Bus. north (Second Street)	North end of US 52 Bus. overlap
Stanly	Albemarle	63.4	102.0	NC 740 north – Badin	
Stanly	Pee Dee River	69.4	111.7	James B. Garrison Bridge	
Montgomery		69.6	112.0	NC 24 east / NC 27 east – Troy	East end of NC 24/27 overlap
Montgomery	Mount Gilead	77.3	124.4	NC 109 (Wadesboro Boulevard/Troy Road) – Wadesboro, Troy	
Montgomery	Mount Gilead	77.6	124.9	NC 731 – Norwood, Candor	
Richmond	Ellerbe	94.8	152.6	US 220 south – Rockingham	South end of US 220 overlap
Richmond		99.5	160.1	US 220 north – Candor	North end of US 220 overlap
Richmond		99.8	160.6	I-73 / I-74 – Rockingham, Asheboro	Diamond interchange, exit 33
Moore	West End	110.8	178.3	NC 211 – Pinehurst, Candor	Brief .2-mile (0.32 km) concurrency
Moore	Whispering Pines	118.5	190.7	US 15 / US 501 – Pinehurst, Carthage	
1.000 mi = 1.609 km; 1.000 km = 0.621 mi: Concurrency terminus

== Special routes ==
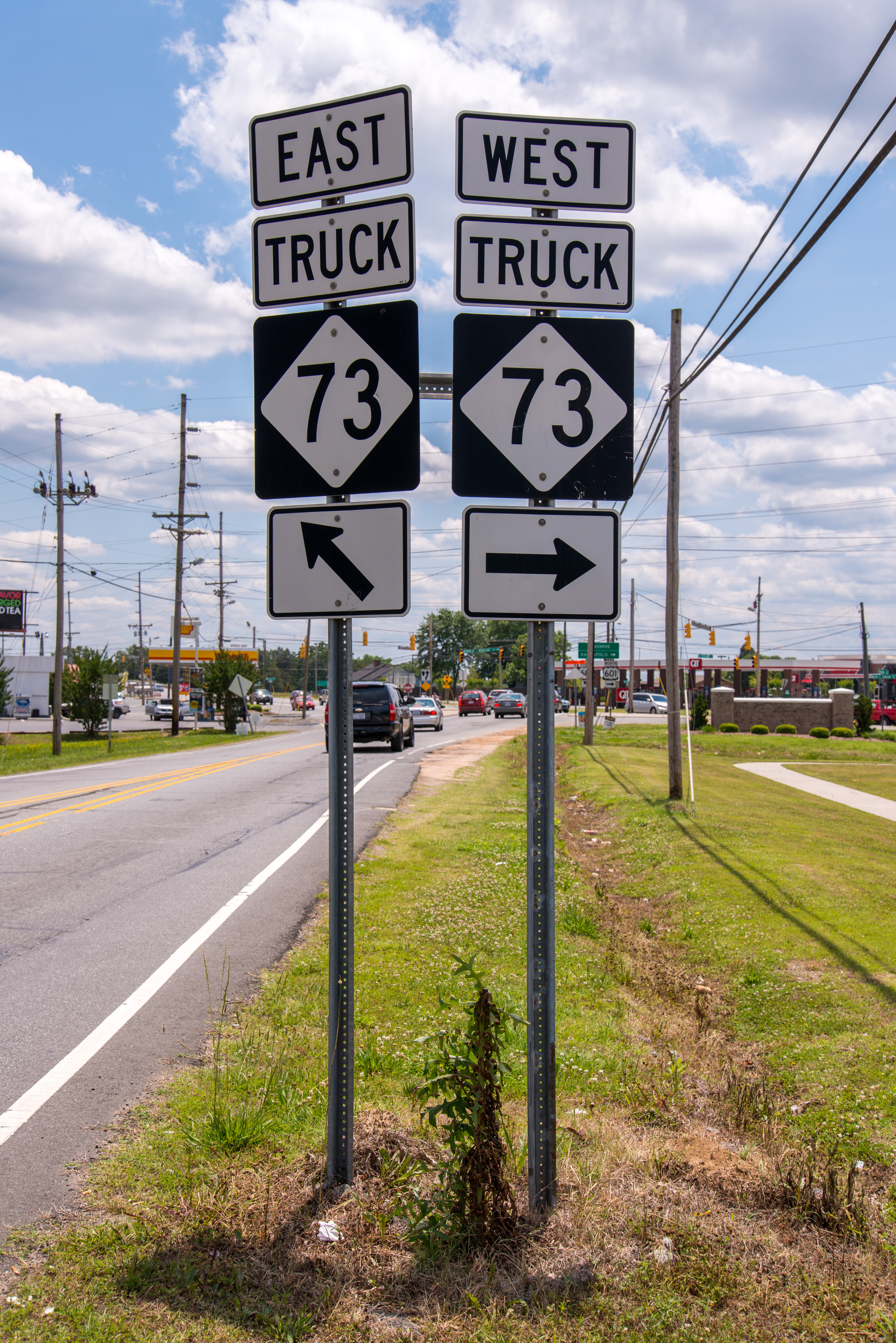
East-West NC 73 Truck, in Concord

=== Concord truck route ===
North Carolina Highway 73 Truck
- Location: Concord, North Carolina
- Length: 13.0 mi (20.9 km)

North Carolina Highway 73 Truck (NC 73 Truck) is a bypass route for truck drivers that are traveling through the city of Concord. This 13-mile (21 km) route goes south around the downtown area, via US 601 (Concord Parkway North & Warren Coleman Boulevard) and NC 49.

== See also ==
- Lake Norman
- North Carolina Bicycle Route 6
