= U.S. Route 220 =

Highway in the United States

U.S. Route 220

Route information
- Auxiliary route of US 20
- Length: 678 mi (1,091 km)
- Existed: November 11, 1926–present

Major junctions
- South end: US 1 in Rockingham, NC
- I-73 / I-74 near Candor, NC; I-85 / US 421 in Greensboro, NC; I-40 in Greensboro, NC; I-81 near Roanoke, VA; I-64 / US 60 near Clifton Forge, VA; I-68 / US 40 in Cumberland, MD; I-70 / I-76 / Penna Turnpike near Bedford, PA; I-99 from Bedford, PA to Bellefonte, PA; I-80 near Bellefonte, PA
- North end: I-86 / NY 17 / Southern Tier Expressway at the PA-NY state line in South Waverly, PA

Location
- Country: United States
- States: North Carolina, Virginia, West Virginia, Maryland, Pennsylvania

Highway system
- United States Numbered Highway System; List; Special; Divided

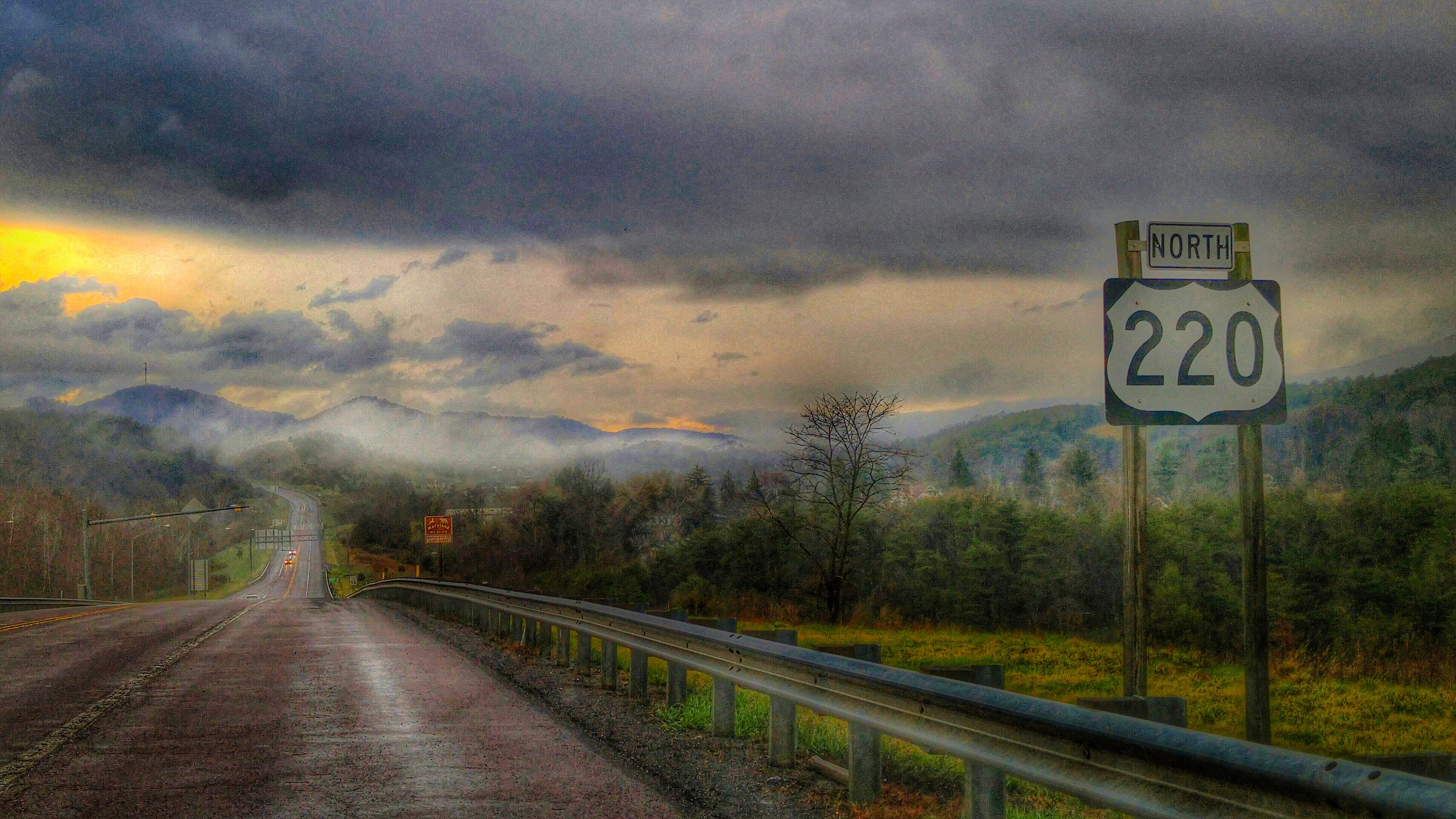
U.S. Route 220 near Cumberland, Maryland

U.S. Route 220 (US 220) is a spur route of US 20. It runs in a north–south layout in the eastern United States, unlike its parent route as well as conventionally even-numbered highways, which run east-west. US 220 extends for 678 miles (1,091 km) from an intersection with US 1 in Rockingham, North Carolina, to its interchange with the Southern Tier Expressway (Interstate 86 and New York State Route 17) in South Waverly, Pennsylvania. Some sections of the route are part of the Appalachian Development Highway System's Corridor O as well as I-73 in North Carolina. US 220 is designated as a spur route of US 20 but the route does not intersect US 20 or connect to other spurs of US 20.

US 220 was assigned in 1926 as part of the establishment of the U.S. Highway System. At the time, it extended from Cumberland, Maryland, to the New York–Pennsylvania border at Lawrenceville, Pennsylvania. One year later, US 220 was realigned north of Williamsport, Pennsylvania, to connect to the New York state line at South Waverly; this supplanted most of what was originally designated U.S. Route 711. US 220 was extended south through Virginia by 1935 and to its current southern terminus by 1941.

== Route description ==
Lengths
	mi	km
NC	123.4	198.6
VA	185.96	299.27
WV	93	150
MD	27.30	43.94
PA	248	399
Total	677.66	1090.81

=== North Carolina ===
US 220 begins at an at-grade interchange with US 1 (South Hancock Street) southwest of Rockingham and northeast of US 1's grade-separated interchange with US 74 (future I-74). Most of US 220 in North Carolina is a four-lane divided highway, and it is a freeway between I-85 and US 1 and US 421 in southern Greensboro. From Rockingham, US 220 travels north through Richmond County to Ellerbe, where US 220 begins to follow a newly constructed four-lane bypass. This section of the route is co-designated as I-74 and I-73. The old US 220 alignment, signed as US 220 Alternate, passes through the towns of Ellerbe and Norman while the new highway goes around the communities.

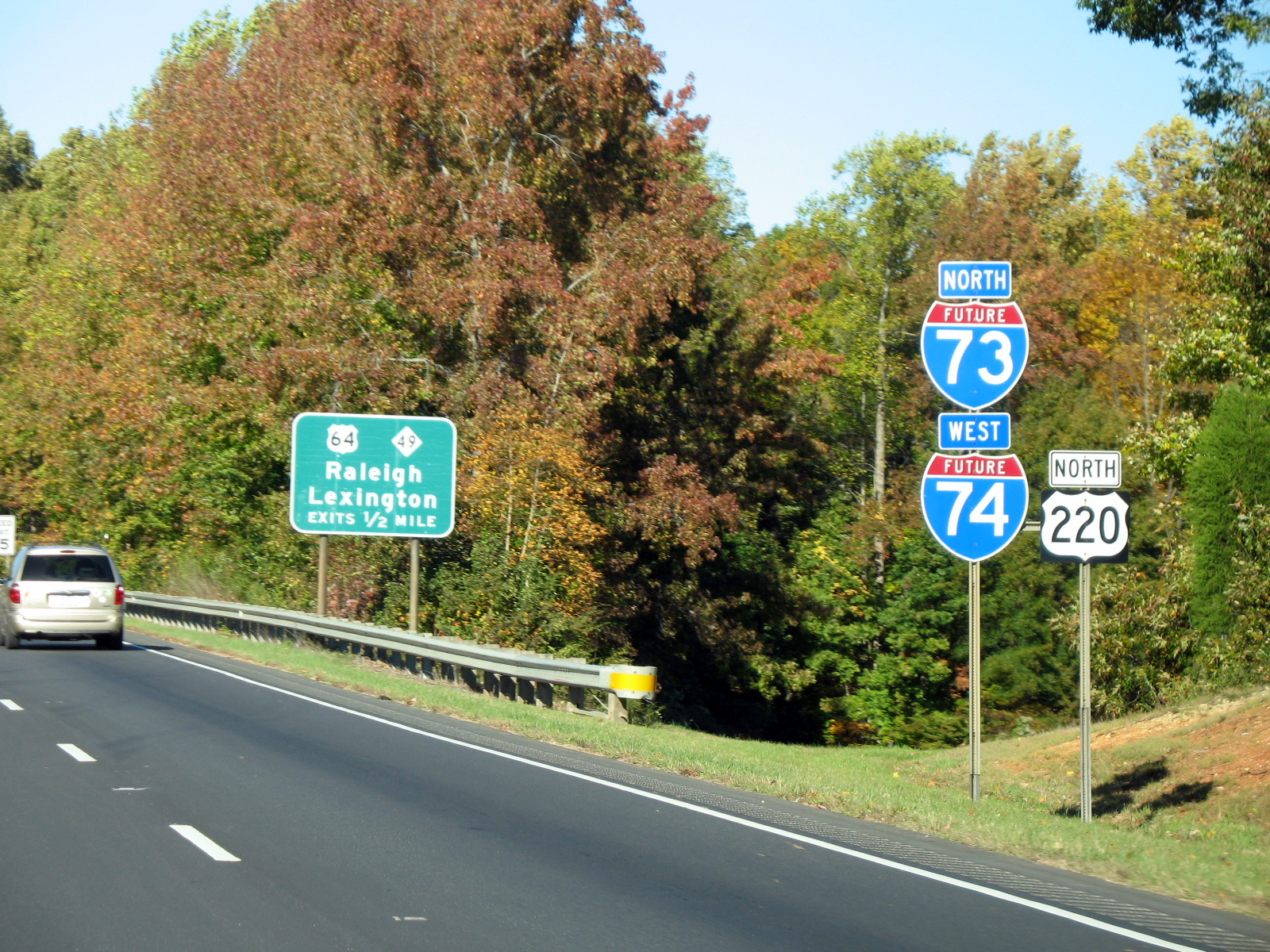
US 220 (I-73 and I-74) northbound near Asheboro

The two highways continue in close proximity through Montgomery and Randolph counties, serving the towns of Candor, Biscoe, Star, and Seagrove. US 220 Alternate rejoins its parent near the North Carolina Zoo, at which point the old path of US 220 continues into Asheboro and Randleman as US 220 Business. The US 220 freeway, meanwhile, skirts the west side of both cities and proceeds to Level Cross, a small community south of the Guilford County line. The business route merges back into the mainline here, and US 220 travels alone into Guilford County.

Outside Greensboro, US 220 intersects I-85 and US 421 (the Greensboro Urban Loop) before intersecting I-85 Business and eventually merging with I-40 in the city. US 220 exits I-40 3 miles (4.8 km) later, following US 29 and US 70 onto O'Henry Boulevard. The three routes separate northeast of the city center, with US 220 continuing west on Wendover Avenue along the northern edge of downtown Greensboro. It eventually exits onto Battleground Avenue, which takes the route north out of Greensboro and into Summerfield and Rockingham County. Another business route splits off US 220 near Madison to serve both Madison and Mayodan, which US 220 itself bypasses to the east. It returns to US 220 north of Stoneville, the last major community along the route before it crosses into Virginia.

=== Virginia ===
US 220 enters the state from the south just south of Martinsville. It uses freeway spurs to bypass Martinsville and Rocky Mount. US 220 in Virginia is a divided four-lane highway with a 55 miles per hour (89 km/h) speed limit for most of the distance between Martinsville and Roanoke. US 220 is a winding road in several stretches, and there have been many accidents. There is also a sharp speed decrease in Boones Mill, giving the town a reputation as a speed trap. The proposed I-73 would generally parallel US 220 between Greensboro, North Carolina, and Roanoke, though funds have not been allocated for the project and some local residents prefer efforts to fix US 220. It is co-signed with I-581 from downtown Roanoke to I-81 north of the city.

The route continues along I-81 northbound until Daleville, at an interchange with US 220 Alternate. US 220 leaves the freeway and once again becomes a four-lane road through Fincastle, the county seat of Botetourt County changing to an upgraded two-lane road at Eagle Rock (near the western edge of Botetourt County) until just outside Iron Gate, Virginia, in eastern Alleghany County, Virginia. Locally, a section in Botetourt County was renamed in 2022 to honor Norvel Lee (1924-1992), a native of Eagle Rock who became a Tuskegee airman, Virginia's first Black Olympic champion, decorated federal civil servant and successful plaintiff in a desegregation lawsuit. US 220 continues on an old two-lane road until it joins up with I-64 westbound until Covington, the Alleghany County seat, and where Lee was jailed for refusing to move from a now-illegal whites-only seat in a railroad car. From there, it continues on a primarily two-lane mountainous route until it reaches the West Virginia state line.

=== West Virginia ===
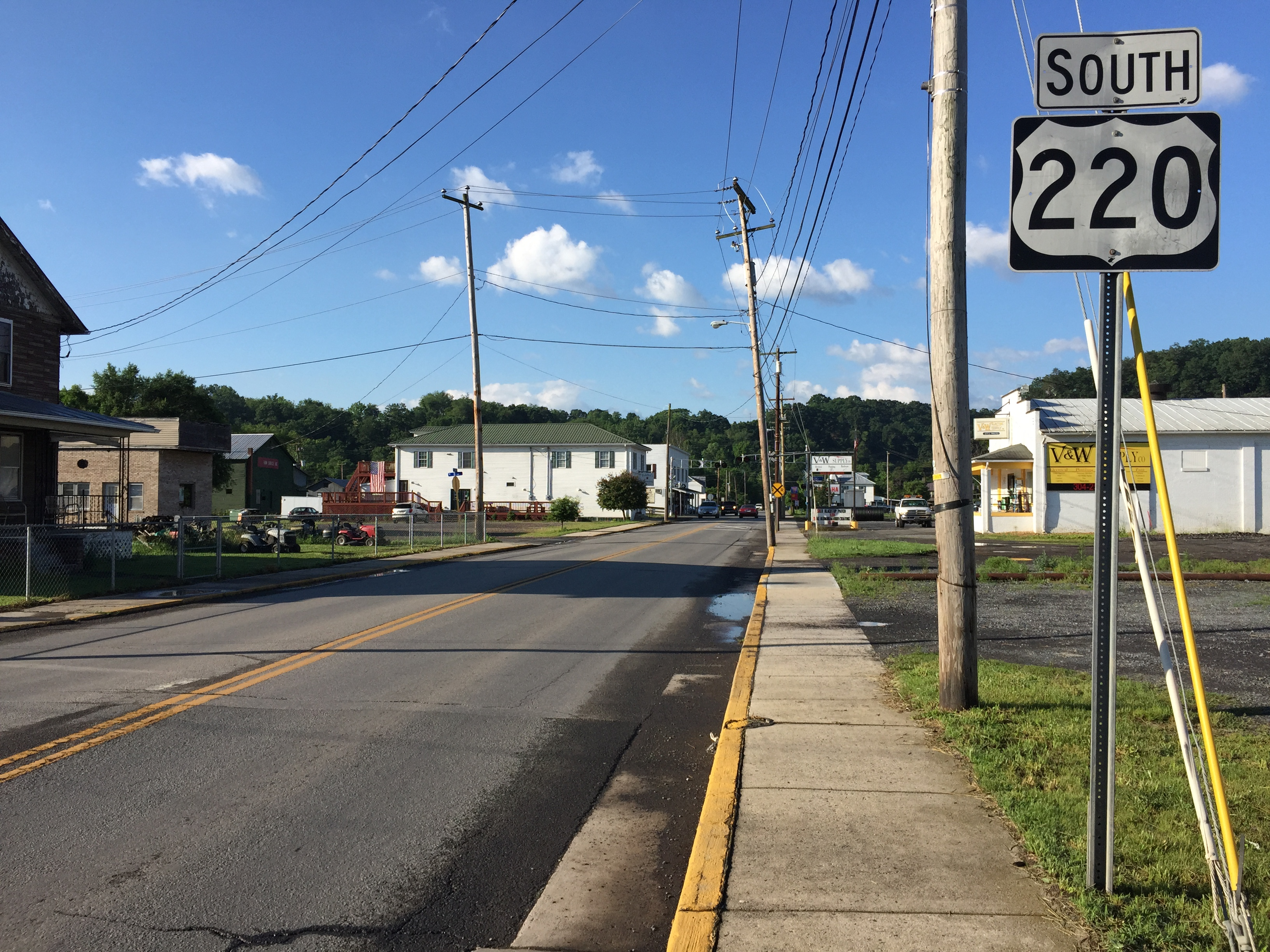
View south along US 220 in Petersburg, West Virginia

The highway enters West Virginia 2 miles (3 km) south of Harper in Pendleton County. From the state line, US 220 parallels the South Branch Potomac River as it progresses northward. 13 miles (21 km) north of Harper, US 220 passes through Franklin, where it intersects with US 33. The route crosses into Grant County approximately 17 miles (27 km) north of Franklin.

Within Grant County, US 220 intersects the concurrent routes of West Virginia Route 28 (WV 28) and West Virginia Route 55 in Petersburg. The two state highways join US 220 eastward into Hardy County. WV 28 and WV 55 remain concurrent to Moorefield, where WV 55 splits from US 220 and WV 28. North of Moorefield, US 220 and WV 28 intersects US 48. US 220 and WV 28 remain concurrent into Hampshire County, where US 220 and WV 28 meet US 50 in Junction. WV 28 departs US 220, following US 50 to the east, while US 220 joins US 50 westward into Mineral County. This stretch of US 220 is known as the Northwestern Turnpike.

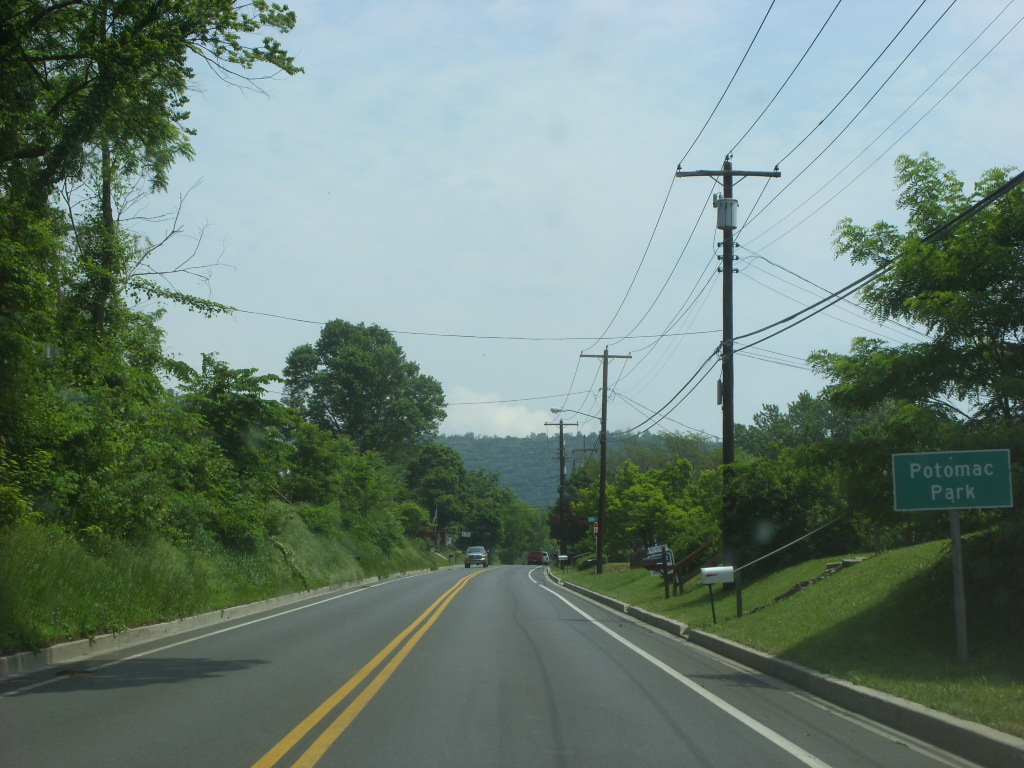
US 220 northbound entering Potomac Park, Maryland

At the top of Knobly Mountain northwest of Ridgeville, US 220 splits from US 50 and resumes a northerly alignment as it descends into the New Creek Valley. It is known as Cut Off Road south of WV 972 and New Creek Drive from there to Keyser, the county seat of Mineral County, where it becomes known as Mineral Street. In the center of the city, located 7 miles (11 km) north of US 50, US 220 intersects WV 46. At the northern edge of Keyser, US 220 crosses the North Branch Potomac River via Memorial Bridge, leaving West Virginia and entering Maryland.

=== Maryland ===
US 220 enters Maryland at McCoole, Allegany County, and becomes known as McMullen Highway. In McCoole, US 220 intersects the eastern terminus of Maryland Route 135 (MD 135). Past MD 135, US 220 turns to the northeast, paralleling the North Branch of the Potomac River to the east. 12 miles (19 km) into Maryland, with West Virginia visible to the right, US 220 intersects the western terminus of MD 956, a connector to a secondary state highway in West Virginia. Continuing north in the river valley, US 220 enters Cresaptown, where US 220 intersects with the east end of MD 53. 4 miles (6 km) north of Cresaptown, US 220 joins with I-68 and US 40, known as the National Freeway west of Cumberland and the Baltimore Pike east of the city.

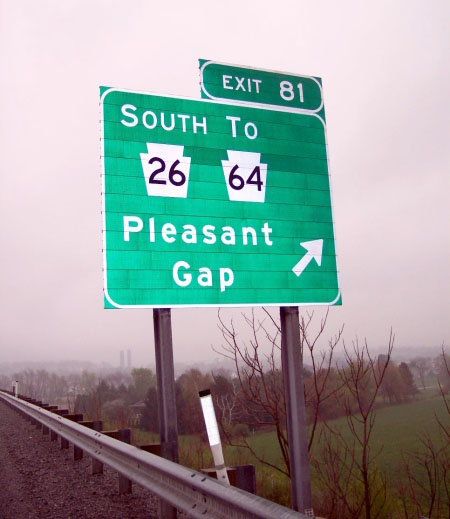
Exit 81 on I-99 / US 220

The three routes head across Wills Creek and through Cumberland to exit 46, US 220 turns north again onto an upgraded roadway opened to traffic on September 18, 2000. The highway heads north for a few miles before crossing the Mason–Dixon line into Pennsylvania. The section of US 220 between I-68 and I-80 near Bellefonte, Pennsylvania, is designated as Corridor O by the Appalachian Development Highway System.

=== Pennsylvania ===
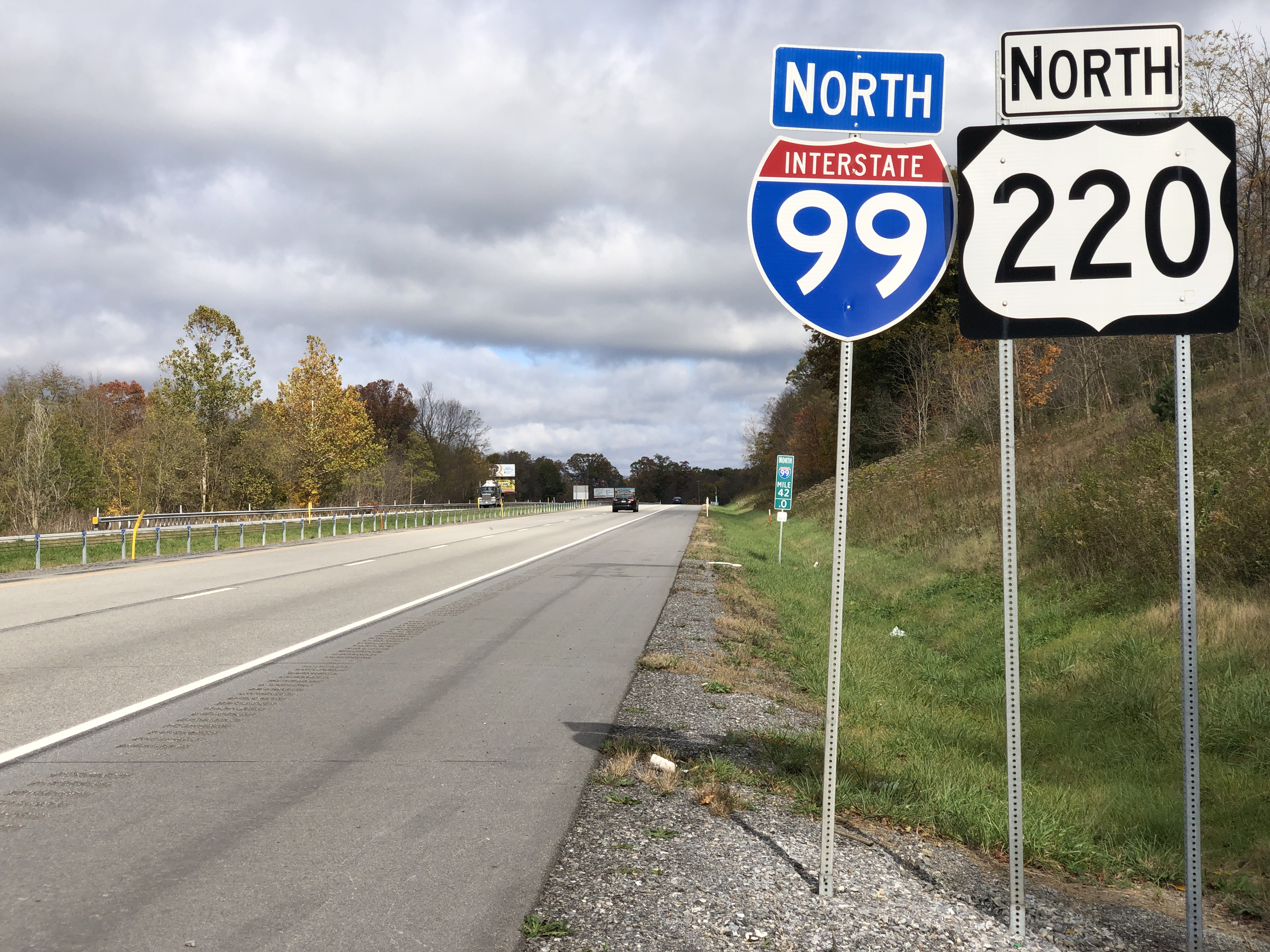
I-99 and US 220 northbound past PA 865 near Bellwood

After crossing the state line from Maryland, US 220 runs north through Bedford County as Cumberland Road to Bedford, where it divides into US 220 Business, which enters the town of Bedford, and the main branch, which joins the southern terminus of I-99 at an interchange with the Pennsylvania Turnpike (I-70 and I-76). I-99 heads north along US 220, and the resulting overlap duplex continues northeast along the west side of Dunning and Brush mountains. The freeway continues into Blair County, where it serves the towns of Altoona and Tyrone. I-99 and US 220 soon enter Centre County in the vicinity of Port Matilda. Here, US 322 joins the alignment and all three routes continue eastward for 12 miles (19 km) to State College.

North of State College, US 322 diverges eastward at the Mount Nittany Interchange while US 220 and I-99 continue northward toward Pleasant Gap. The concurrency travels past Bellefonte to I-80, where I-99 currently ends. All of I-99 is known as the Bud Shuster Highway, named for the U.S. Representative who championed the I-99 designation. US 220 follows I-80 eastward for 11 miles (18 km) to Clinton County before exiting northward as a recently upgraded, short section of super-two limited-access highway before once again becoming a limited-access expressway traveling through the east side of Lock Haven. Past Lock Haven, US 220 runs alongside the west branch of the Susquehanna River, becoming an at-grade road north of Jersey Shore for 6.2 miles until it reaches W Fourth St south of Williamsport. It finally becomes a freeway once again at Williamsport as it joins I-180, here an east–west highway, and US 15.

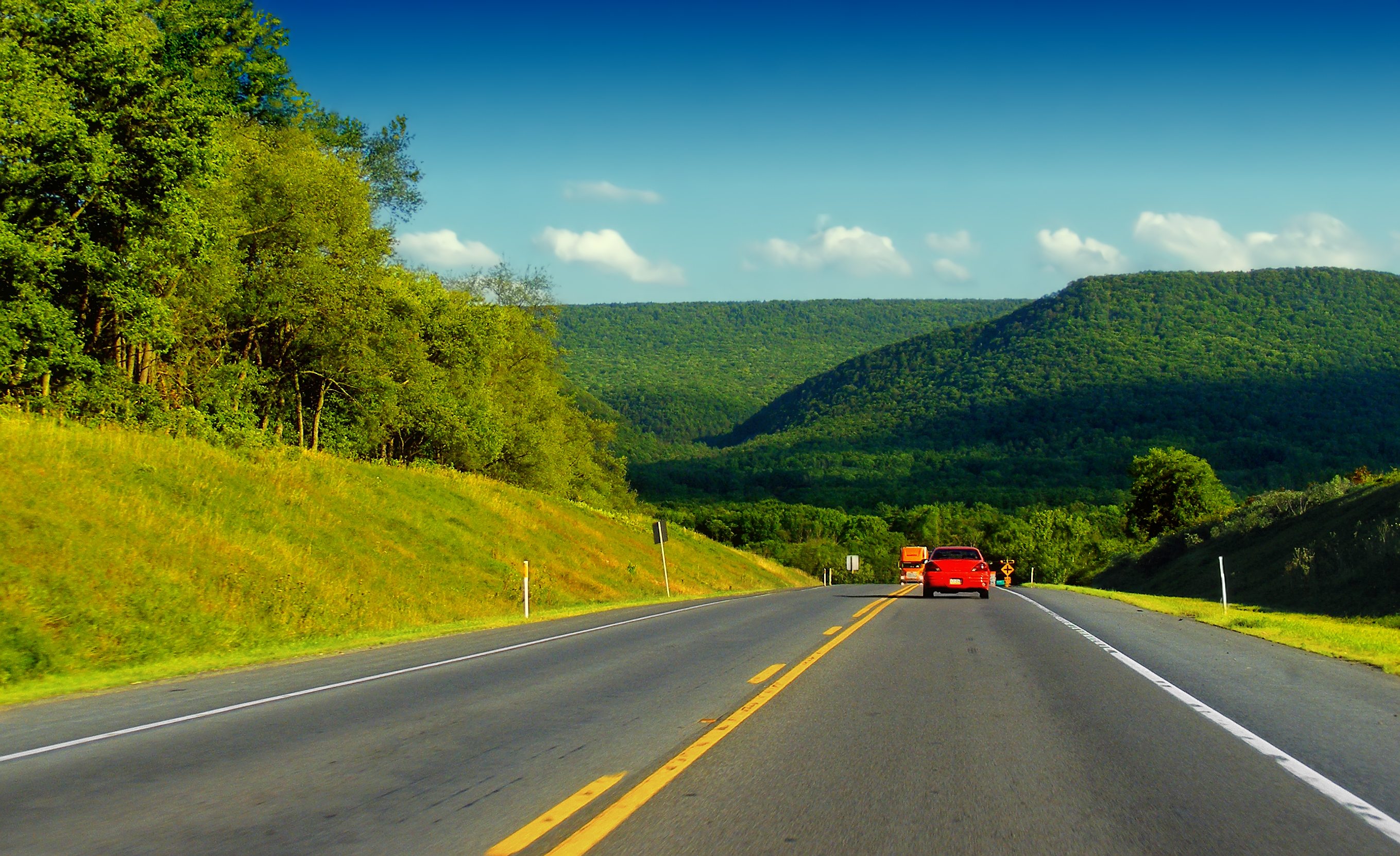
US 220 near I-80 exit 178 in Clinton County

I-180 and US 220 head through the center of the city, briefly overlapping with US 15 in the downtown district, before splitting near Halls Station. The Interstate Highway turns to the south, following the Susquehanna River toward Muncy while US 220 exits the expressway onto a two-lane road that first travels east to Hughesville, a borough based around US 220's junction with Pennsylvania Route 405 (PA 405). US 220 heads generally northeastward from Hughesville, passing through Laporte on its way to Dushore. It is here that the route changes directions for the final time, assuming a northerly alignment that it largely follows for the remainder of its routing. A short section of super-two limited-access freeway is used to bypass Towanda, a borough 16 miles (26 km) north of Dushore on the banks of the main Susquehanna River. One interchange along this stretch links US 220 to US 6.

Past Towanda, US 220 continues on a northerly path, paralleling the Susquehanna River to the borough of Athens. Here, US 220 becomes a freeway for the final time at an exit with PA 199, the main north–south highway through the neighboring boroughs of Athens, Sayre, and South Waverly. US 220 bypasses all three to the west, proceeding toward the New York state line. The route comes to an end at its interchange with the Southern Tier Expressway, which at this point has briefly crossed into Pennsylvania, within sight of the state line.

== History ==
=== Origins ===
US 220 was assigned as part of the establishment of the U.S. Highway System on November 11, 1926. The route began at US 40 in Cumberland, Maryland, and followed its modern corridor northeast to Williamsport, Pennsylvania. The highway turned north here, proceeding northward along the current US 15 corridor to its end at the New York–Pennsylvania border in Lawrenceville. US 220 did not directly connect to US 20, its implied parent; instead, the connection was intended to be made via US 120, a route extending from Philadelphia to US 20 in Erie. As originally planned, US 120 and US 220 would overlap between Lock Haven, Pennsylvania, and Williamsport. East of Williamsport, the modern US 220 corridor was served by US 120 from Williamsport to Muncy and US 711 between Muncy and the New York state line at South Waverly. When US 120 was signed in 1927, it was altered to run only from Reading to Ridgway, isolating both US 120 and US 220 from US 20.

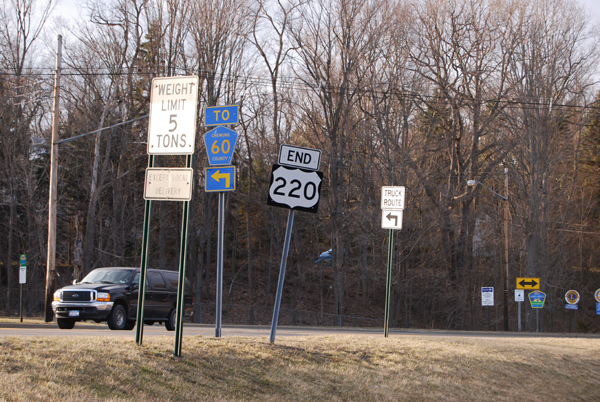
Former northern terminus of US 220 in Waverly, New York

In early 1927, US 220 absorbed the Muncy–South Waverly section of US 711, which had continued south from Muncy to meet US 11 in Northumberland, Pennsylvania. From Williamsport to Muncy, US 220 utilized what had been planned as US 120. Former US 220 from Williamsport north to the state line at Lawrenceville became part of an extension of US 111, which was also assigned to the piece of old US 711 south of Muncy. Most of this alignment of US 220 followed previously unnumbered roads, save for two areas in the vicinity of Bald Eagle and Williamsport, Pennsylvania, where it followed short pieces of PA 5 and PA 4, respectively. Both routes were assigned in 1924.

=== Extensions and truncations ===
The largely intrastate route was significantly extended over the course of the next decade. It was extended past Cumberland to the Virginia state line by 1930, through Virginia to the North Carolina state line by 1935, and finally to US 1 in Rockingham, North Carolina, by 1941. In Virginia, US 220 replaced the piece of SR 18 north of Covington, all of SR 12 (Clifton Forge to near Roanoke), and all of US 311 in Virginia, originally designated in 1926 to run from US 11 in Roanoke south along SR 33 to North Carolina.

US 220 was extended into New York—albeit for only a half-mile (0.8 km)—by 1948. At the time, the route followed Keystone Avenue through Sayre to South Waverly, where it turned onto Bradford Street. The highway turned again after three blocks, proceeding north on Pennsylvania Avenue to the state line and into the adjacent village of Waverly, New York. US 220 ended five blocks into New York at an intersection with Chemung Street, then part of NY 17.

When the Southern Tier Expressway was built, Chemung Street became a section of NY 17C as NY 17 was moved onto the freeway. NY 17C was truncated to a junction with NY 34 several blocks to the east in the late 2000s, leaving US 220 isolated from the rest of New York's numbered route system. In 2017, the American Association of State Highway and Transportation Officials (AASHTO) approved a request by New York and Pennsylvania to delete US 220 north of I-86/NY 17.

=== Realignments ===
==== Pennsylvania ====
The Athens–Sayre Bypass, a limited-access highway bypassing the boroughs of Athens and Sayre, was completed in 1973. US 220 was realigned to follow the new highway, which began southwest of Athens and ended at a junction with Chemung Street less than 0.1 miles (0.16 km) north of the state line. Most of US 220's former alignment became PA 199; however, the northernmost part of PA 199 was assigned to an alternate alignment to the east on Mohawk and Spring streets, both of which were already state-maintained. The Pennsylvania Avenue (former US 220) state line crossing was dismantled as part of the Southern Tier Expressway's construction.

US 220 originally continued northeast of Port Matilda, along the at-grade Appalachian Thruway to an interchange with I-80 near Milesburg. US 220 was realigned onto US 322 and a limited-access highway running from State College to Bellefonte on May 30, 2003, at which point the previous route via Milesburg was redesignated as US 220 Alternate. The latter route was extended to Tyrone when US 220 was moved onto a new section of I-99 from Tyrone to Port Matilda in 2008. In the future, US 220 and I-99 will form a 135-mile (217 km) concurrency throughout much of central Pennsylvania, from the interchange with the Pennsylvania Turnpike at Bedford to the intersection with US 15 at Williamsport. I-99 will leave US 220 here to follow US 15 north to Corning, New York.

==== Other areas ====
The southern terminus of US 220 in Rockingham was originally at the intersection of East Broad and Hancock streets (US 1 and US 74), where a sign said "US 220 Ends Here". From here, US 220 went north on current US 74 Business, Old Ellerbe Road and Billy Covington Road before rejoining its current alignment north of the city. The four-lane portion of US 220 between Ellerbe and Rockingham roads was completed in two sections; the northern one, ending at the north end of Billy Covington Road, was finished first in the 1960s. Some of the old alignment is still visible at the north end of Billy Covington Road.

Parts of US 220 in Virginia south of Roanoke follow what used to be called the Carolina Road or the Great Road. These roads, stretching from the current day Philadelphia area to what is now Atlanta (southern end of the Appalachian Mountains), were mostly roads built over old Indian trails. Another branch went west from present day Roanoke to Cumberland Gap. Parts of this road in Henry County are now known as the Old Stage Road. It crossed the Smith River just north of the current US 220 crossing. From Henry County the road crossed the Mayo River and headed towards Winston-Salem, North Carolina. The Mayo River crossing is still visible. In Martinsville, Virginia, US 220 originally passed through downtown Martinsville on West Church Street and Starling Avenue. It was moved onto the newly built Memorial Boulevard the late 1940s and onto a new bypass around Collinsville and Martinsville in the mid-1970s. The alignment through Collinsville and Martinsviile remains signed as Business US-220.

In the vicinity of Cumberland, Maryland, US 220 originally proceeded into the city limits on Greene Street. It crossed Wills Creek via Baltimore Street before connecting to Mechanic Street. From Mechanic Street to the city limits, traffic was split between two parallel one-way streets, with northbound traffic carried by Frederick Street and southbound traffic carried by a narrower Bedford Street until the streets merged as Bedford Road, now unsigned MD 807, north of the city. The highway continued on a northeasterly track to connect to Pennsylvania at the Mason–Dixon line.

== Major intersections ==
North Carolina
US 1 in Rockingham
I-73 / I-74 south-southwest of Ellerbe. I-73/US 220 travels concurrently to south of Greensboro. I-74/US 220 travels concurrently to Randleman.
US 64 in Asheboro
I-73 / I-85 / US 421 south of Greensboro
US 29 / US 70 in Greensboro
I-40 in Greensboro. The highways travel concurrently through Greensboro.
US 29 / US 70 in Greensboro. The highways travel concurrently through Greensboro.
US 158 east-northeast of Stokesdale
US 311 in Madison. The highways travel concurrently to Mayodan.
Virginia
US 58 south of Martinsville. The highways travel concurrently to Horse Pasture.
I-581 in Roanoke. The highways travel concurrently to Hollins.
US 460 in Roanoke
I-81 / I-581 in Hollins. I-81/US 220 travels concurrently to north of Cloverdale
I-81 / US 11 north of Cloverdale. US 11/US 220 travels concurrently for approximately 0.2 miles (0.32 km).
I-64 / US 60 in Cliftondale Park. I-64/US 220 travels concurrently to Mallow. US 60/US 220 travels concurrently to Covington.
US 250 in Monterey
West Virginia
US 33 in Franklin. The highways travel concurrently to north of Franklin.
US 48 in Moorefield
US 50 in Junction. The highways travel concurrently to southeast of New Creek.
Maryland
I-68 / US 40 in Cumberland. The highways travel concurrently to northeast of Cumberland.
Pennsylvania
US 30 near Bedford
I-99 near Bedford. The highways travel concurrently to near Bellefonte
US 22 in Duncansville
US 322 near Port Matilda. The highways travel concurrently to State College.
I-80 near Bellefonte. I-80/US 220 travels concurrently to east of Mackeyville.
I-180 / US 15 in Williamsport. I-180/US 220 travels concurrently to southwest of Pennsdale. US 15/US 220 travels concurrently through Williamsport.
US 6 near Towanda
I-86 / NY 17 / Southern Tier Expressway in South Waverly

== See also ==
- Special routes of U.S. Route 220

Browse numbered routes
← NC 218	NC	→ US 221
← US 219	WV	→ WV 230
← US 219	MD	→ MD 221
← US 219	PA	→ PA 221
