= Steeds, North Carolina =

Unincorporated community in North Carolina, US

Steeds is an unincorporated community located in the northeastern part of Montgomery County, North Carolina, United States.

== Location ==
Steeds is located on US 220 (Alt) two miles north of the Community of Ether. The community is at the crossing of Hwy 220, State Road 1332 (Plantation Road) and State Road 1365 (Steed Road), with State Road 1361 (Bean Road) junctioning with Steed Road.

The community of Steeds lies four miles north of the Town of Star and five miles south of the Town of Seagrove. The Community of Blackankle is three miles west of Steeds..

Steeds is approximately one mile west of Moore County, three miles south of Randolph, eighteen miles north of Richmond County, and eighteen miles east of Stanly County.

The elevation of Steeds is 662 feet above sea level, and it lies at 35°25′15″N 79°46′39″W (35.47083, -79.77778).

Steeds is one mile north of Interstate 73 / Interstate 74, off the Ether/Steeds exit.

Steeds is twelve miles south of The North Carolina Zoological Park.

The United States Coast and Geodetic Survey Triangulation Station Markers

Located at the Steed homeplace (1948)

== Steeds today ==
The Community of Steeds is not the once prosperous railroading area as in the past, but the people of Steeds are still close and friendly.

Religion plays a big part in the community. The Asbury Baptist Church and Mt. Zion Wesleyan Church are both within a few miles from the center of the community.

Greenthumb Nursery, established in 1960, supplies landscaping companies and wholesale dealers with variations of trees, bushes, flowers, plants, and other landscaping items.

Agriculture is a huge way of life for many people living near the Steeds area. There are many livestock farms in the area, which includes cattle, chickens, pigs and horses. There is also a large number of farms that produce a wide variety of vegetation, including wheat straw, produce, hay, pine straw, and other things that help the farmers of the Community of Steeds make a living.
