= Emery, North Carolina =

- Unincorporated Community
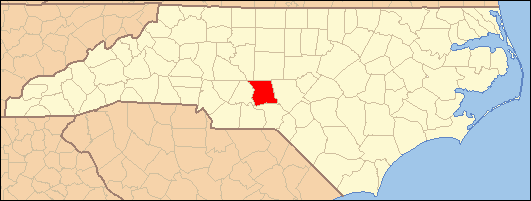
- Map of Montgomery County, North Carolina, in which Emery is located
- Coordinates: 35°14′51″N 79°43′21″W
- Country: United States
- State: North Carolina
- County: Montgomery
- Elevation: 682 ft (208 m)
- Time zone: UTC-5 (Eastern (EST))
  - Summer (DST): UTC-4 (EDT)
- ZIP Code: 27281 (Jackson Springs)
- Area codes: 910, 472
- GNIS feature ID: 1020150

Emery is an unincorporated community in Montgomery County, North Carolina, United States. It is located along the co-designated Interstate 73 - Interstate 74, approximately 50 miles south of Greensboro where the interstates intersect U.S. Route 220. It is roughly equidistant between Raleigh to the east and Charlotte to the west.
