= Wind Blow, North Carolina =

Unincorporated community in North Carolina, US

Coordinates: 35.1718°N 79.6668°W

Wind Blow is an unincorporated crossroads community on the border of Montgomery and Richmond counties, North Carolina, United States. Located at the intersection of North Carolina Highway 73 and NC State Road 1003, Wind Blow is an agricultural community. Wind Blow is noted for its peach production; it is the namesake for the Winblo variety of peach. This particular peach, and many others, was developed at the Sandhills Research Station, a facility operated by North Carolina State University, one mile north of the crossroads. The community has a small grocery store and a trucking business in addition to the area farms.
