= Price, North Carolina =

- Unincorporated community
- Location of Price in North Carolina Price, North Carolina (the United States)
- Coordinates: 36°32′20″N 79°54′53″W
- Country: United States
- State: North Carolina
- County: Rockingham
- Elevation: 1,047 ft (319 m)
- Time zone: UTC-5 (Eastern (EST))
  - Summer (DST): UTC-4 (EDT)
- ZIP code: 27048
- Area code: 336
- FIPS code: 37-37157
- GNIS feature ID: 1022076
- Other names: Grogansville; Prices Store

Price is an unincorporated community in northern Rockingham County, North Carolina, United States, located on U.S. Route 220/Future Interstate 73.

It is named after John Price, who owned the land on which a store and post office were built. The post office existed from 1870 to 1956, and was called "Price's Store" from 1870 to 1891.
