= Ulah, North Carolina =

Unincorporated community in North Carolina, US

Coordinates: 35°38′07″N 79°49′36″W

Ulah is an unincorporated community in Randolph County, North Carolina, United States. south of the neighboring county seat of Asheboro.

== History ==
Ulah has, for most of its existence, been a little known community. The origin of the name Ulah may refer to Ulaid, a Gaelic over-kingdom in north-eastern Ireland during the Middle Ages. Ulaid gave its name to the province of Ulster where many settlers of North-Western Piedmont backcountry frontier came from via the Great Wagon road from Pennsylvania. Ulah hosted a station and a crew section house for the Aberdeen & Asheboro Railroad. Trains continued to run through Ulah until the line was abandoned in 1952. The section house, built in 1897, can be seen next to US 220 alternate near station road. It has a commemorative plaque denoting its heritage.

== Community ==
The Ulah area is home to many people who work in Asheboro.

== Future ==
There has been talk about incorporating Ulah. The area is densely populated. If incorporated, Ulah would possibly be a tough competitor for Trinity in the title of second most populated city in Randolph County.
