= Candor, North Carolina =

- Town
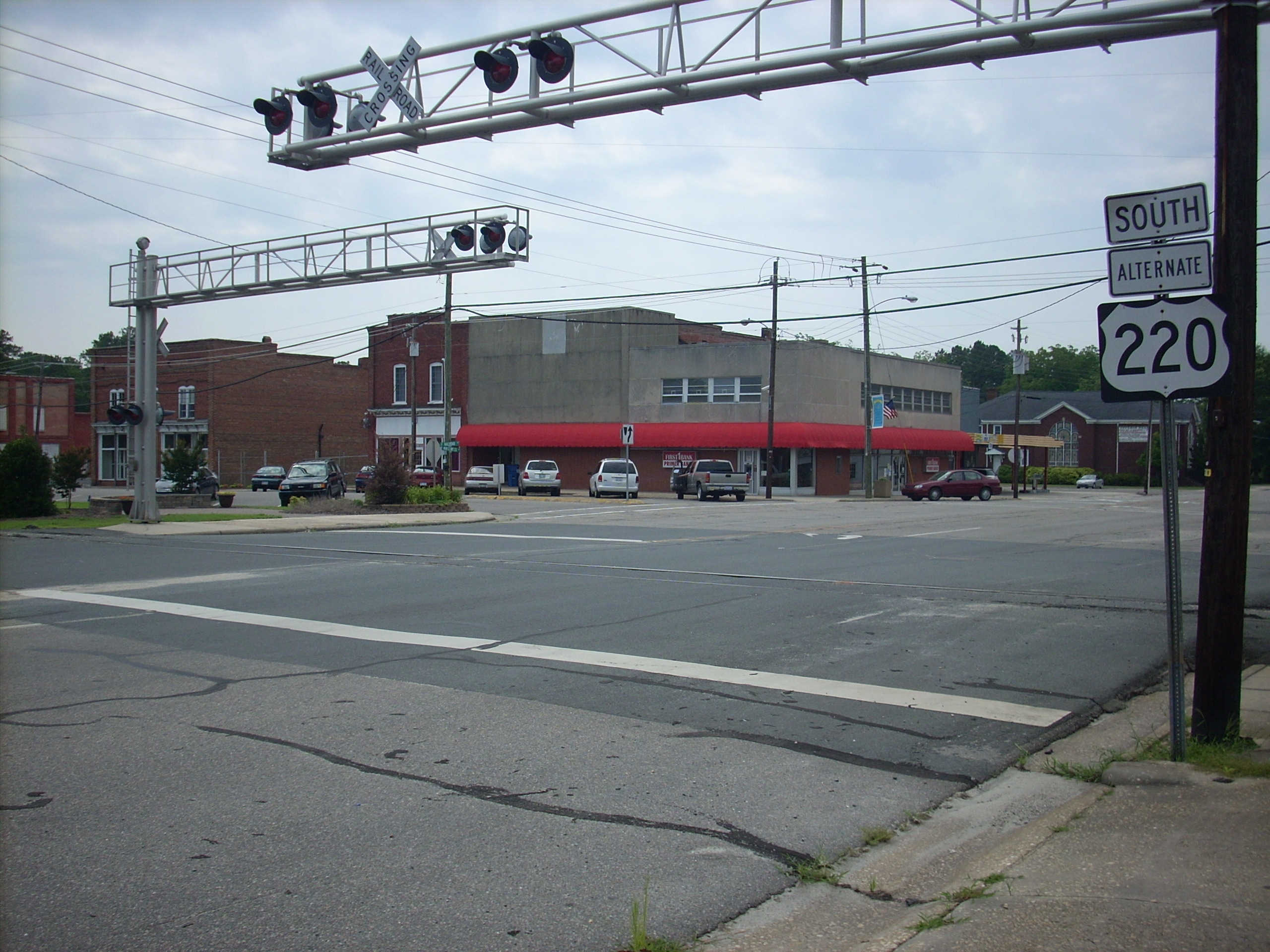
- Candor
- Nickname: "The Peach Capital of North Carolina"
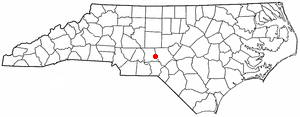
- Location in North Carolina
- Coordinates: 35°17′47″N 79°43′57″W
- Country: United States
- State: North Carolina
- Counties: Montgomery, Moore

Area
  - Total: 2.03 sq mi (5.25 km^{2})
  - Land: 2.03 sq mi (5.25 km^{2})
  - Water: 0 sq mi (0.00 km^{2})
- Elevation: 719 ft (219 m)

Population (2020)
  - Total: 813
  - Density: 400/sq mi (155/km^{2})
- Time zone: UTC-5 (Eastern (EST))
  - Summer (DST): UTC-4 (EDT)
- ZIP Codes: 27229 (Candor); 20209 (Biscoe)
- Area codes: 910, 472
- FIPS code: 37-10120
- GNIS feature ID: 2405374
- Website: www.townofcandornc.com

Candor is a town in Montgomery and Moore counties, North Carolina, United States. The population was 813 at the 2020 census. Candor is the home of the North Carolina Peach Festival, held every year on the third Saturday of July.

== History ==
Candor was so named for the settlers' honest dealings.

== Geography ==
Candor is in southeastern Montgomery County, with the town limits extending east into western Moore County. U.S. Route 220 Alternate passes through the center of town as Main Street, leading north 5 miles (8 km) to Biscoe and south 9 miles (14 km) to Norman. North Carolina Highway 211 has its western terminus in Candor and leads southeast 19 miles (31 km) to Pinehurst. The Interstate 73/Interstate 74/U.S. Route 220 freeway passes just east of Candor, with access from Exit 44. The freeway leads north 30 miles (48 km) to Asheboro and south 26 miles (42 km) to Rockingham.

According to the U.S. Census Bureau, the town of Candor has a total area of 2.0 square miles (5.2 km^{2}), all land. The west side of the town drains into tributaries of the Little River, part of the Pee Dee River watershed. The northeast part of town drains toward Cabin Creek, part of the Deep River watershed leading to the Cape Fear River, while the southeast part drains toward Drowning Creek, a headwaters stream of the Lumber River and part of the Pee Dee River watershed.

== Demographics ==
Historical population
Census	Pop.	Note	%±
1910	160		—
1920	267		66.9%
1930	462		73.0%
1940	509		10.2%
1950	617		21.2%
1960	593		−3.9%
1970	561		−5.4%
1980	868		54.7%
1990	748		−13.8%
2000	825		10.3%
2010	840		1.8%
2020	813		−3.2%
U.S. Decennial Census

=== 2020 census ===
Candor racial composition
Race	Number	Percentage
White (non-Hispanic)	322	39.61%
Black or African American (non-Hispanic)	75	9.23%
Asian	8	0.98%
Other/Mixed	13	1.6%
Hispanic or Latino	395	48.59%

As of the 2020 United States census, there were 813 people, 335 households, and 266 families residing in the town.

=== 2000 census ===
As of the census of 2000, there were 825 people, 280 households, and 204 families residing in the town. The population density was 691.2 inhabitants per square mile (266.9/km^{2}). There were 299 housing units at an average density of 250.5 per square mile (96.7/km^{2}). The racial makeup of the town was 79.03% White, 8.73% African American, 0.24% Native American, 0.36% Pacific Islander, 7.39% from other races, and 4.24% from two or more races. Hispanic or Latino of any race were 27.03% of the population.

There were 280 households, out of which 30.0% had children under the age of 18 living with them, 56.1% were married couples living together, 11.4% had a female householder with no husband present, and 27.1% were non-families. 26.8% of all households were made up of individuals, and 12.1% had someone living alone who was 65 years of age or older. The average household size was 2.76 and the average family size was 3.21.

In the town, the population was spread out, with 23.4% under the age of 18, 7.8% from 18 to 24, 27.2% from 25 to 44, 21.9% from 45 to 64, and 19.8% who were 65 years of age or older. The median age was 40 years. For every 100 females, there were 101.2 males. For every 100 females age 18 and over, there were 92.7 males.

The median income for a household in the town was $37,917, and the median income for a family was $42,000. Males had a median income of $27,031 versus $20,673 for females. The per capita income for the town was $15,107. About 8.3% of families and 14.4% of the population were below the poverty line, including 16.8% of those under age 18 and 6.6% of those age 65 or over.
