= Level Cross, Randolph County, North Carolina =

Level Cross, North Carolina
- Unincorporated community
- Location of Level Cross in North Carolina Level Cross, North Carolina (the United States)
- Country: United States
- State: North Carolina
- County: Randolph
- Elevation: 820 ft (250 m)
- Time zone: UTC-5 (Eastern (EST))
  - Summer (DST): UTC-4 (EDT)
- Area code: 336
- GNIS feature ID: 988368

Level Cross is an unincorporated community in Randolph County, North Carolina. It is located at the intersection of U.S. Route 220 with Branson Mill Road. Level Cross is located a few miles north of Randleman.

== Naming ==
The community was named on account of its flat main intersection, or level crossroads.

== Notable people ==
Level Cross is the hometown of the Petty racing family, beginning with patriarch Lee and his sons, driver Richard and engine builder Maurice. Richard was born in Level Cross in 1937 and his brother Maurice was born there in 1939. It was also the birthplace of their cousin, crew chief Dale Inman in 1936.
