= Randleman Lake =

- Location within North Carolina Location within the United States
- Location: Randolph / Guilford counties, North Carolina, United States
- Coordinates: 35°48′54″N 079°46′35″W
- Type: Reservoir
- Primary inflows: Deep River& Muddy Creek
- Primary outflows: Deep River
- Basin countries: United States
- Surface area: 3,007 acres (1,217 ha)
- Shore length^{1}: 65 mi (105 km)
- Surface elevation: 682 ft (208 m)
- ^{1} Shore length is not a well-defined measure.

Randleman Lake is a reservoir on the Deep River in Randolph and Guilford Counties in central North Carolina, extending from just northwest of Randleman to east of High Point. The lake was created in 2004 with the construction of the Randleman Lake Dam. The lake was created to satisfy the drinking water needs of the greater Greensboro area for the next 50 years, as well as to provide recreational opportunity.

== History ==
The lake is in the Cape Fear River basin and was originally proposed by the US Army Corps of Engineers (USACE) in 1937. Congress first authorized funds in 1968, $11 million. By 1980, only preliminary studies had been done and the estimated cost was $135 million. Later, in 1987, the US Army Corps of Engineers withdrew support for the project because the "cost of the Randleman Dam would outweigh the flood control benefits of building it".

Later that same year, the local Piedmont Triad Regional Water Authority (PTRWA) proposed a smaller reservoir, with a $57 million price tag, which used 40% less land. Over the next several years, environmental impact statements were offered by the PTRWA, with the final Federal Environmental Impact Statement for the Randleman Lake Project being issued in 2000. On April 6, 2001, the USACE issued a permit to allow construction, which began on August 7 of the same year. On March 1, 2010 the lake officially opened to public recreation.

== Drinking water ==
The lake's primary purpose is to provide drinking water for Greensboro, North Carolina. This is to be accomplished by treating the raw water in a new water treatment plant in High Point, North Carolina, 20 miles (32 km) southwest of Greensboro. The City of Greensboro started receiving treated water from Piedmont Triad Regional Water Authority on October 4, 2010.

== Recreation ==
Fishing and sailing is permitted in most areas of the lake. Personal watercraft are not allowed, nor sailboats with main masts over 25 feet (7.6 m) in height. Because it is a government run facility for the purpose of providing drinking water, boats are not allowed overnight and other significant restrictions apply to fueling boats within the area. There is a lake-wide speed limit of 25 mph (40 km/h) for all boats. North of the Highway 62 bridge, no gasoline or liquid fueled motors are allowed at all.
