= Ether, North Carolina =

Unincorporated community in North Carolina, US

Coordinates: 35°26′23″N 79°47′02″W

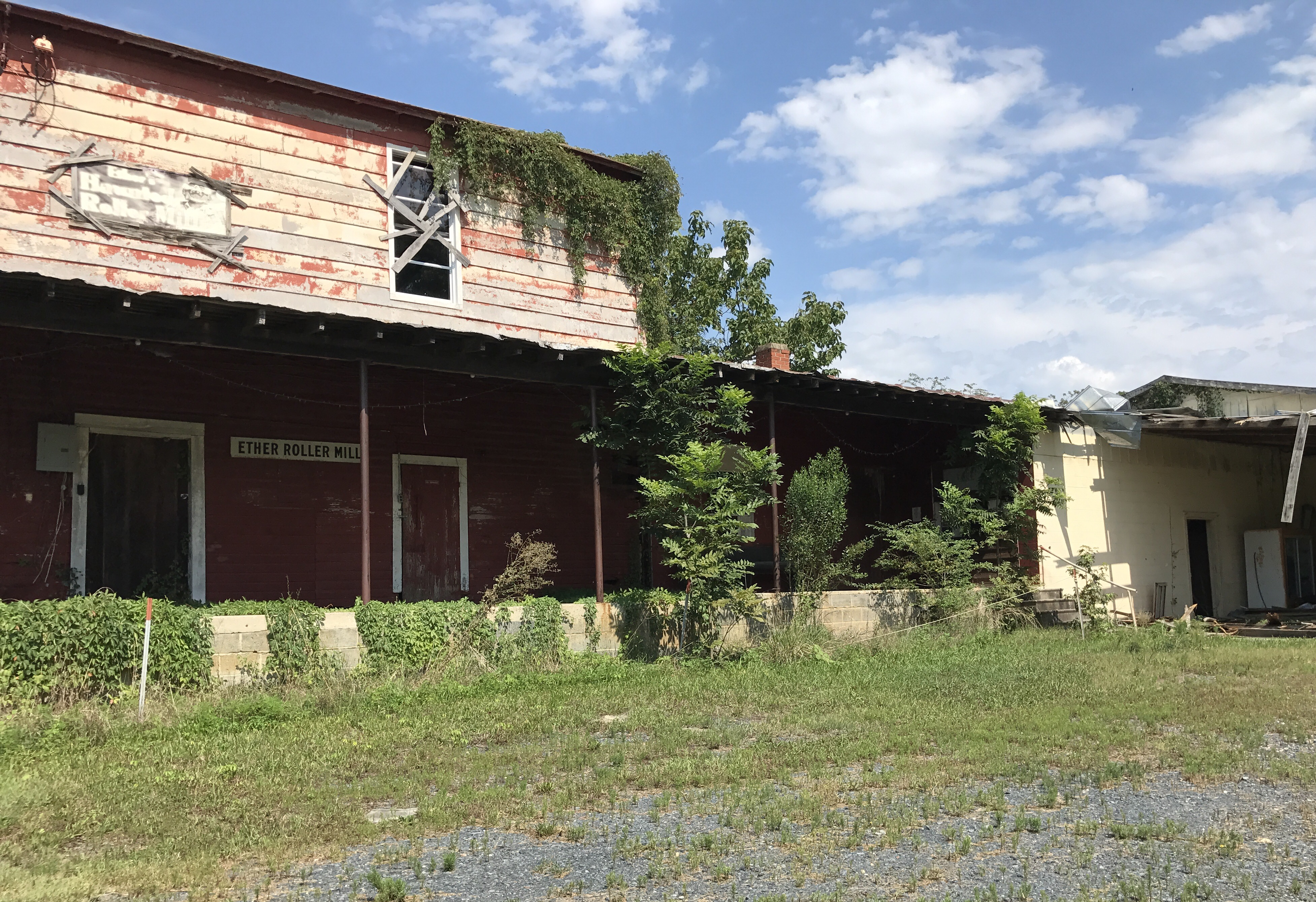
Former roller mill in Ether

Ether is an unincorporated community in the northeastern part of Montgomery County, North Carolina, United States. The ZIP Code for Ether is 27247. The building pictured is the Ether Roller mill, which tax records indicate was built in 1800. It has also been used as a local spooky attraction. The building has lost integrity since 2017 when it was left to the elements.

A post office called Ether has been in operation since 1888. The community was named for ether, a drug once prescribed by a local physician.
