= Norman, North Carolina =

- Town
- Location within the state of North Carolina
- Coordinates: 35°10′11″N 79°43′23″W
- Country: United States
- State: North Carolina
- County: Richmond

Area
  - Total: 0.56 sq mi (1.46 km^{2})
  - Land: 0.56 sq mi (1.46 km^{2})
  - Water: 0 sq mi (0.00 km^{2})
- Elevation: 623 ft (190 m)

Population (2020)
  - Total: 100
  - Density: 177.9/sq mi (68.69/km^{2})
- Time zone: UTC-5 (Eastern (EST))
  - Summer (DST): UTC-4 (EDT)
- ZIP code: 28367
- Area codes: 910, 472
- FIPS code: 37-47260
- GNIS feature ID: 2406999

Norman is a town in Richmond County, North Carolina, United States. As of the 2020 census, Norman had a population of 100.

== Geography ==
According to the United States Census Bureau, the town has a total area of 0.4 square miles (1.0 km^{2}), all land.

== Demographics ==
Historical population
Census	Pop.	Note	%±
1930	240		—
1940	327		36.3%
1950	300		−8.3%
1960	220		−26.7%
1970	157		−28.6%
1980	252		60.5%
1990	105		−58.3%
2000	72		−31.4%
2010	138		91.7%
2020	100		−27.5%
U.S. Decennial Census

As of the census of 2000, there were 72 people, 33 households, and 16 families residing in the town. The population density was 167.6 inhabitants per square mile (64.7/km^{2}). There were 50 housing units at an average density of 116.4 per square mile (44.9/km^{2}). The racial makeup of the town was 72.22% White, 15.28% African American, 11.11% Asian, and 1.39% from two or more races.

There were 33 households, out of which 33.3% had children under the age of 18 living with them, 33.3% were married couples living together, 12.1% had a female householder with no husband present, and 51.5% were non-families. 48.5% of all households were made up of individuals, and 27.3% had someone living alone who was 65 years of age or older. The average household size was 2.18 and the average family size was 3.38.

In the town, the population was spread out, with 25.0% under the age of 18, 5.6% from 18 to 24, 26.4% from 25 to 44, 23.6% from 45 to 64, and 19.4% who were 65 years of age or older. The median age was 40 years. For every 100 females, there were 94.6 males. For every 100 females age 18 and over, there were 68.8 males.

The median income for a household in the town was $15,625, and the median income for a family was $21,607. Males had a median income of $20,500 versus $0 for females. The per capita income for the town was $8,959. There were 23.5% of families and 33.3% of the population living below the poverty line, including 28.6% of under eighteens and 44.4% of those over 64.
