= National Register of Historic Places listings in Montgomery County, North Carolina =

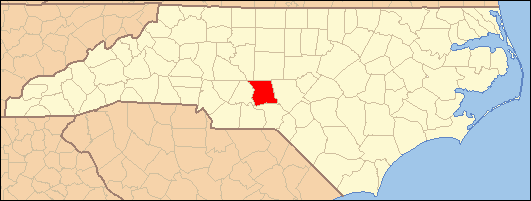

This list includes properties and districts listed on the National Register of Historic Places in Montgomery County, North Carolina. Click the "Map of all coordinates" link to the right to view an online map of all properties and districts with latitude and longitude coordinates in the table below.

== Current listings ==
This National Park Service list is complete through NPS recent listings posted August 22, 2025.

	Name on the Register	Image	Date listed	Location	City or town	Description
1	Hotel Troy	Hotel Troy	August 23, 2006 (#06000720)	Northwestern corner of the junction of N. Main and Smitherman Sts. 35°21′45″N 79°53′44″W	Troy	A historic commercial building located built in 1908-1909
2	Lane's Chapel Methodist Church and Cemetery		August 28, 2025 (#100012160)	144 Lane's Chapel Road; 35°28′48″N 80°06′32″W	Eldorado Township	
3	Montgomery County Courthouse	Montgomery County Courthouse	May 10, 1979 (#79001737)	E. Main St. between S. Main and S. Pearl Sts. 35°21′29″N 79°53′36″W	Troy	A historic courthouse, designed by the noted architectural firm of Benton & Benton and built in 1921.
4	Mount Carmel Presbyterian Church and Cemetery		December 19, 2019 (#100004795)	1367 Clayton Carriker Rd. 35°10′25″N 79°45′23″W	Norman	Extends into Richmond County.
5	Mount Gilead Downtown Historic District	Mount Gilead Downtown Historic District	December 23, 2005 (#05001447)	Main St. from First Ave. to 106 and 117 S. Main St., and the 100 block of W. Allenton St. 35°12′54″N 80°00′07″W	Mount Gilead	A national historic district that encompasses 25 contributing buildings in the central business district of Mount Gilead.
6	Site 31Mg22		August 5, 1985 (#85001750)	Eastern side of the Yadkin River, east of Badin; 35°23′45″N 80°04′12″W	Badin	A historic archaeological site with remains from the Archaic period in North America.
7	Star Historic District	Star Historic District	September 9, 2013 (#13000699)	Roughly bounded by College, 1st, and Dameron Sts. 35°24′13″N 79°47′04″W	Star	Encompasses 90 contributing properties: 85 buildings, 2 sites, and 3 structures
8	Town Creek Indian Mound	Town Creek Indian Mound	October 15, 1966 (#66000594)	Western side of the Little River, southeast of Mount Gilead; 35°10′57″N 79°55′46″W	Mount Gilead	A prehistoric Native American archaeological site whose main features are a platform mound with a surrounding village and wooden defensive palisade. The site was built by the Pee Dee people.
9	Troy Residential Historic District	Troy Residential Historic District	August 23, 2006 (#06000719)	Eastern side of N. Main St., from one lot north of Chestnut St. to one lot north of Blair St., and 105 Blair St. 35°21′38″N 79°53′37″W	Troy	A national historic district that encompasses five contributing dwellings in a residential section of Troy.

== See also ==
- National Register of Historic Places listings in North Carolina
- List of National Historic Landmarks in North Carolina
