= List of bicycle routes in North Carolina =

The following is a list of bicycle routes in North Carolina. These routes are designated by the North Carolina Department of Transportation (NCDOT) Bicycle and Pedestrian Transportation Division.

== State ==
=== U.S. Bicycle Route 1 ===
U.S. Bicycle Route 1
- Carolina Connection
- Location: SC State Line–VA State Line
- Length: 200 mi (320 km)

The North Carolina portion of U.S. Bicycle Route 1 is known as the Carolina Connection and runs north–south through the central portion of the state, passing through Raleigh.

=== North Carolina Bicycle Route 2 ===
North Carolina Bicycle Route 2
- Mountains to Sea
- Location: Murphy–Manteo, NC
- Length: 700 mi (1,100 km)

North Carolina Bicycle Route 2 is known as The Mountains to the Sea. Running 700 miles from Murphy in the western mountains to Manteo on the Atlantic coast, this route crosses most of the nine statewide signed and mapped bicycle routes that the North Carolina Department of Transportation has designated.

=== North Carolina Bicycle Route 3 ===
North Carolina Bicycle Route 3
- Ports of Call
- Location: SC State Line–VA State Line
- Length: 300 mi (480 km)

North Carolina Bicycle Route 3, the Ports of Call Route, is one of nine bicycle routes designated by the North Carolina Department of Transportation. It runs along North Carolina's coast for 300 miles (480 km) from South Carolina to Virginia near major ports of the US colonial era—Southport, Wilmington, New Bern, Bath, and Edenton. Near Wilmington it connects with North Carolina Bicycle Route 5. It crosses North Carolina Bicycle Route 2 near Washington and North Carolina Bike Route 4 near the Virginia border. Other points of interest along this route include Fort Fisher State Historic Site, Carolina Beach State Park, the Croatan National Forest Recreation Areas, Tryon Palace, Goose Creek State Park and Merchants Millpond State Park.

=== North Carolina Bicycle Route 4 ===
North Carolina Bicycle Route 4
- North Line Trace
- Location: Piney Creek–Knotts Island, NC
- Length: 400 mi (640 km)

North Carolina Bicycle Route 4, known as the North Line Trace, is a bicycle path that runs from east to west across North Carolina just south of the state's border with Virginia.

The route, which is nearly 400 miles (640 km) in length, reaches six state parks and several other recreation areas, including Stone Mountain State Park, Pilot Mountain State Park, Hanging Rock State Park, and Merchants Millpond State Park; Hyco Reservoir, Kerr Lake and Lake Gaston Recreation Areas; and the Dismal Swamp and Currituck Sound areas. Campgrounds are located roughly every 75 miles (121 km) along the route.

=== North Carolina Bicycle Route 5 ===
North Carolina Bicycle Route 5
- Cape Fear Run
- Location: Apex–Southport, NC
- Length: 160 mi (260 km)

North Carolina Bicycle Route 5, the Cape Fear Run, travels 160 miles (260 km) along the Cape Fear River from Apex through the southeast coastal plain to Wilmington at the sea. In Wilmington, it connects with North Carolina Bicycle Route 3, the Ports of Call Route. Rolling hills soon give way to flat land in the swamps and Carolina bays typical of this region of the state. Notable points of interest include Jones Lake State Park, Moore's Creek National Military Park, the USS North Carolina Battleship Memorial, Brunswick Town State Historic Site, Carolina Beach State Park, and Fort Fisher State Historic Site.

=== North Carolina Bicycle Route 6 ===
North Carolina Bicycle Route 6
- Piedmont Spur
- Location: Upper Creek–Snow Camp, NC
- Length: 200 mi (320 km)

North Carolina Bicycle Route 6, the Piedmont Spur, is a 200 miles (320 km) southern alternate route of the Mountain to the Sea through the North Carolina Piedmont.

The route begins at the intersection of NC 181 (Beatrice Cobb Highway) and Brown Mountain Beach Road. The route goes south to Morganton and Lincolnton; then east to Boger City, Huntersville, Concord, and Albemarle. After entering Montgomery County, it goes northeast through the communities of Ophir, Seagrove, and Staley, before ending in Snow Camp at the intersection of Pleasant Hill Church Road and Greensboro-Chapel Hill Road.

The route is well marked with directions, also "Share the Road" signs are typical along portions of the North Carolina Highways that overlap with the bicycle route. A few locations along the route, specifically in Mecklenburg, Cabarrus, and Stanly counties, can be considered dangerous because of either construction or high traffic volumes along route.

=== North Carolina Bicycle Route 7 ===
North Carolina Bicycle Route 7
- Ocracoke Option
- Location: Wilson–Ocracoke, NC
- Length: 170 mi (270 km)

North Carolina Bicycle Route 7, the Ocracoke Option, connects Bike Route 2 near Wilson 170 miles (270 km) southeast to Ocracoke. The route passes through New Bern and Beaufort and uses the Cedar Island Ferry to Ocracoke.

=== North Carolina Bicycle Route 8 ===
North Carolina Bicycle Route 8
- Southern Highlands
- Location: Blue Ridge Parkway–Lincolnton, NC
- Length: 120 mi (190 km)

North Carolina Bicycle Route 8, the Southern Highlands, runs 120 miles (190 km) through the Blue Ridge Mountains in southwestern North Carolina. The east end of the route is Bike Route 6 near Lincolnton.

=== North Carolina Bicycle Route 9 ===
North Carolina Bicycle Route 9
- Sandhills Sector
- Location: Lake Tillery–Gum Springs, NC
- Length: 125 mi (201 km)

North Carolina Bicycle Route 9, the Sandhills Sector, is a 125-mile (201 km) moderate difficulty route from NC Bicycle Route 6, east of Lake Tillery/Pee Dee River, to NC Bicycle Route 5, in Gum Springs. The route travels through the Uwharrie National Forest, Mount Gilead, Aberdeen, Raeford and Hope Mills.

== Regional ==
=== Lake Norman Bicycle Route ===
Lake Norman Bicycle Route
- Location: Catawba, Iredell, and Mecklenburg Counties
- Length: 60 mi (97 km)

The Lake Norman Bicycle Route connects five towns and cities in three counties that surround Lake Norman, the largest inland body of water in the state. The overall route, using the "LN" signage, traverses between Huntersville and Sherrills Ford, with loops and spurs that also connect Cornelius, Davidson, Mooresville, Troutman, and Lake Norman State Park. The route was established jointly between the Centralina Council of Governments and NCDOT Bicycle and Pedestrian Division.

=== Pottery Loop ===
Pottery Loop
- Location: Montgomery, Moore, Randolph, and Richmond Counties
- Length: 155 mi (249 km)

The Pottery Loop connects 13 small towns in four counties in central North Carolina. The route highlights potters, equestrian ranches, peach growing farms as well as several game lands and wildlife reserves. Signage along the route use the letters "PL," and overlaps in some sections with USBR 1, NCBR 6, and NCBR 9. The route was established as part of the Central Park Bicycle Plan, jointly between the Piedmont Triad Regional Council and NCDOT Bicycle and Pedestrian Division.
