= Okeewemee, North Carolina =

Unincorporated community in North Carolina, US

Coordinates: 35°24′28″N 79°51′14″W

Okeewemee is an unincorporated community that is located in Montgomery County, North Carolina, United States.

== Location ==
Okeewemee lies between the Town of Star and the Town of Troy, at the junction of State Road 1340 (Okeewemee - Star Road) and State Road 1323 (Okeewemee Road) in Montgomery County. The community is approximately three miles (4.8 km) west of Star, four miles (6.4 km) northeast of Troy, and nine miles (14 km) southwest of the Town of Seagrove. The Community of Black Ankle is four miles north of Okeewemee.

Okeewemee is also located approximately seven miles (11 km) west of Moore County, six miles (9.7 km) south of Randolph County, 12 miles (19 km) east of Stanly County, and 16 miles (26 km) north of Richmond County.

Okeewemeee lies at an elevation of 620 feet (190 m).

Okeewemee is three miles (4.8 km) west of US 220 (Alt), U.S. Highway 220 (Bypass), and Interstate 73 / Interstate 74. The community is also four miles (6.4 km) east of N.C. Highway 134.

== History ==
In the early 19th century, small schools had sprung up in Montgomery County. One of those was the Forks of Little River School, later called Crossroads.

Earliest records date back to 1884 when the school committee responsibility appointing a teacher, securing funds to pay the teacher and laying plans for needed facilities. The same year Sam Fountain, Elijah Richardson and J.A. Reynolds made up the committee with Malcolm McMillan replacing Richardson in 1886. Others serving on the school committee C.C. Wallace, John R. Richardson, Ben F. Reynolds, John Allen, and Noah Shepherd. Many of these served for 25–30 years.

By 1891, the school had assumed the name of Okeewemee in honor of the community and its first Post Office which had it start in the home of Elizabeth Coggins and John L. Allen.

Around the turn of the 20th century the new Okeewemee School was built by Shepherd, McMillan and Reynolds. The building was a long one room structure with a porch across the front and a shingled steeple. A total of 53 boys and girls attended the school at the time. Children were taught through the seventh (7) grade.

In 1908, a total of 36 boys and 22 girls were enrolled in the Okeewemee School - ranging in age six (6) years old to twenty (20) years old!

After the consolidation of the county schools, the Okeewemee School was discontinued.

Gold

The Carter Mine is one of the oldest mines in North Carolina.It is described as being on a vein that contained much lime carbonate and a rare telluride of gold. The mine is said to have produced $100,000 or more from workings less than 100 ft. deep. Gold bearing quartz was found in a vein that averaged 3 ft. in width and contained some very rich steaks. Rock found on the dumps in 1934 included "sugar" vein quartz.

== Okeewemee today ==
Okeewemee is a small unincorporated community that has strong foundations in education, religion, and family values.

Kerry Collins, NFL Pro Bowl quarterback and Heisman Trophy Finalist, makes Okeewemee his home. He owns the Blue Q Ranch, a 2000+ acre livestock farm. He has hundreds of head of cattle on the ranch, along with multiple houses/buildings on the property.

Okeewemee is the home of the Montgomery County Humane Society, which supports and houses tens of hundreds of homeless pets that are ready for adoption.

The Forks Of Little River Baptist Church is located in Okeewemee. It was established in 1760. It was used as the first schoolhouse in the community and is still one of the county's most popular churches, with a devoted congregation and a prominent worship service.
