= Black Ankle, North Carolina =

Unincorporated community in North Carolina, US

Black Ankle is an unincorporated community in the northeastern part of Montgomery County, North Carolina, United States.

== Location ==
The community of Black Ankle is located at the junction of NC State Road 1349 (Ether Road) and NC State Road 1354 (Blackankle Road). It lies approximately 10 miles (16 km) north of Troy, 8 miles (13 km) northwest of Star, 7 miles (11 km) north of Okeewemee, 4 miles (6.4 km) southwest of Seagrove, 5 miles (8.0 km) northwest of Ether, and 3 miles (4.8 km) west of Steeds.

Black Ankle is 3 miles (4.8 km) west of Interstate 73 / Interstate 74 / U.S. Hwy 220, off exit 42 (Black Ankle Road Exit), three miles west of U.S. 220 (Alt), and three miles east of NC Hwy 134.

The community is 0.5-mile (800 m) south of the Randolph County line. It lies 3 miles (4.8 km) west of Moore County, 8 miles (13 km) east of Davidson County, 13 miles (21 km) east of Stanly County, and 15 miles (24 km) north of Richmond County.

The coordinates of Black Ankle are 35°30′07″N 79°48′26″W (35.50208 north latitude and -79.80726 west longitude). Black Ankle is 682 feet (208 m) above sea level.

Black Ankle was saluted on a 1973 episode of Hee Haw. At that time, it had a population of 132.

== History ==
There are many different "tales" of how Black Ankle actually got its name.

The origin of the name Black Ankle is from the late 1920s or early 1930s when gold was discovered in 1928 near Franklin Mountain. Many people came to the area to try to make their fortune in the mine or to be laborers and make a decent living. About once a week, in the evenings after the working day was over, the miners would all climb on the back of a truck or trailer and ride to Star, Ether or Steeds to restock on supplies they may need to get them through another week. In the area where the Franklin Mountain (Blackankle Gold Mine) is located, the soil is very dark, rich and fertile. These miners almost always were shoeless when they went into town and the black dirt from the area, mixed with a little water, made their feet discolored and dark. Everywhere the miners went, people would see the feet of the visitors and say "Here comes the blackanklers." It was soon after the discovery of gold that Black Ankle, from the miners with dirty feet, got its name.

=== Gold ===
The Blackankle Mine is a former gold mine established after a 1928 discovery by a man named Bud Latham. Edward Hedrick ("Uncle Ed"), the owner until 1935, reported a total production of $15,000 or about 750 ounces. The workings comprise a pit 225 feet (69 m) long, 120 feet (37 m) wide and 50 feet (15 m) deep, a shaft 112 feet (34 m) deep in the pit and a shallow shaft sunk in the bottom of the pit. The ore body as a whole is of low grade, though its gold content is not actually known. Treatment of the material by washing, amalgamation, cyanidation, and other methods has recovered on the average only a few cents to the ton. Considerable gold is to be said to have been lost owing to its extremely fine subdivision and slime produced by a clay like saprolite substance. The Blackankle Mine operated intermittently until a few years ago.

=== Blackankle Fort ===
The Blackankle Fort, originated and built by Lester Singleton, was once known throughout the state of North Carolina as a conglomerate of the unusual. The Fort was built as a museum and a "funhouse" for people and their families to visit. The special events at Halloween, including a haunted hayride and haunted house, attracted people from all over North Carolina. In the spring many "pickers" (mostly bluegrass string musicians) would spend Friday and Saturday nights at the Blackankle Fort honing their skills and sounds.

== Black Ankle today ==
Black Ankle is a very close-knit area, with many of its residents belonging to the same families. Family and friends of the Black Ankle area enjoy numerous social events during the year, in which a large number will gather. The Big Oak Church of God is the closest place to worship, and a large congregation attends on most services.

=== Blackankle Bog Preserve ===
The Blackankle Bog Preserve is one of the few remaining Piedmont bogs. The bog is 284 acres (1.15 km^{2}) total and is owned by The Nature Conservancy. The tract of land was purchased in 1991 from the Dassow Property Corporation. Over the next 20–25 years, the North Carolina Chapter will continue to restore the preserve to its historic condition by setting prescribed burns and replanting longleaf pine tree seedlings grown from local seed sources. The North Carolina Zoo, US Fish and Wildlife Service, and the NC Division of Forest Restoration are actively involved in supporting the Blackankle Bog Preserve and the Nature Conservancy in this restoration effort.

A patch of climbing fern, a large stand of sweetleaf, and the rare large witch-alder grow on the preserve. Birds such as wild turkeys, hairy and pileated woodpeckers, and broad-winged hawks, which are commonly found on large tracts of unbroken woodlands, also inhabit the bog. Toward the streamheads, the vegetation shifts from plant communities that require dry conditions, such as longleaf pines and chestnut oaks woodlands common to the nearby Uwharrie Mountains, to the treeless areas of the bog community. Blackjack and post oaks, and dense huckleberry and blueberry shrubs surround mats and sphagnum moss and patches of habenaria orchids, milkworts, sedges, cinnamon ferns, and trumpet and purple pitcher plants. Downhill from the bog the habitat blends into a dense thicket dominated by alder, sweet bay, sweet pepper brush, Virginia sweet-spire, and the endangered bog spicebrush grows in these areas. It contains scattered longleaf pines, reminders of the trees that were once prevalent in this area on the border between the Coastal Plain and the Piedmont.
