= Cheek Creek Township, Montgomery County, North Carolina =

Coordinates: 35.22984°N 79.87451°W

- Township
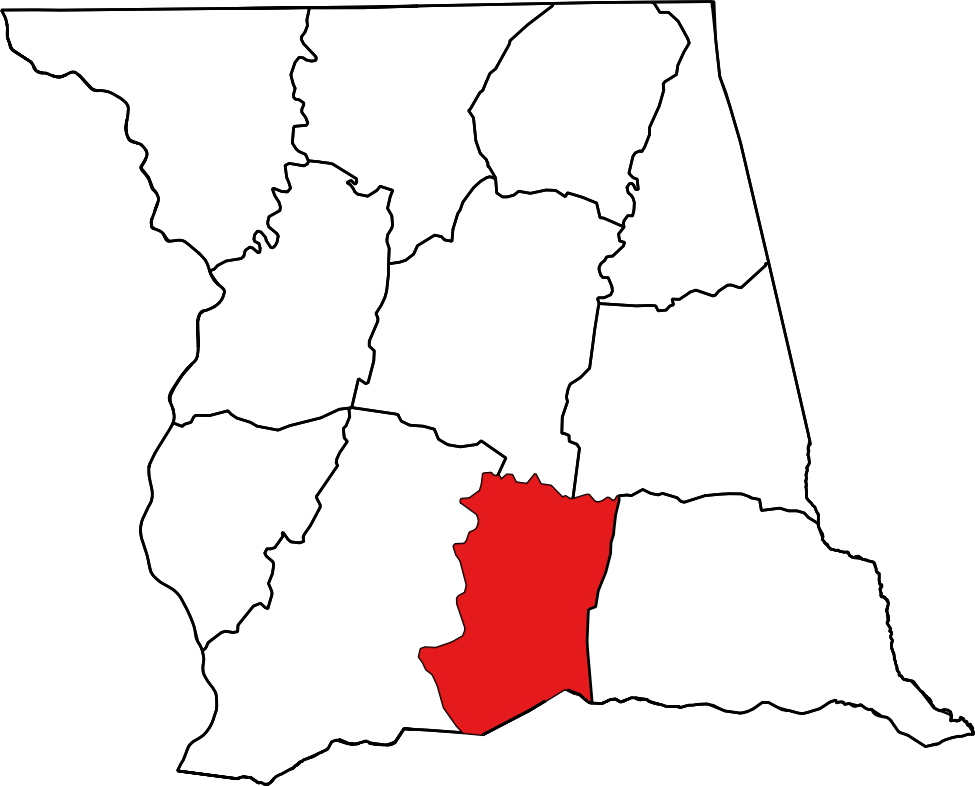
- Location of Cheek Creek Township in Montgomery County

- Location of Montgomery County in North Carolina
- Country: United States
- State: North Carolina
- County: Montgomery

Area
  - Total: 35.03 sq mi (90.73 km^{2})
- Highest elevation (northeast end north of Polly Branch): 674 ft (205 m)
- Lowest elevation (Little River at southwest corner of township): 188 ft (57 m)

Population (2010)
  - Total: 628
  - Density: 17.93/sq mi (6.92/km^{2})
- Time zone: UTC-4 (EST)
  - Summer (DST): UTC-5 (EDT)
- Area codes: 910, 472

Cheek Creek Township, population 628, is one of eleven townships in Montgomery County, North Carolina, United States. Cheek Creek Township is 35.03 square miles (90.7 km^{2}) in size and is located in the south-central part of the county.

== Geography ==
Cheek Creek Township is drained entirely by the Little River and its tributaries. The Little River is part of the larger Pee Dee River watershed. The northeast part of the township has a small area of the Uwharrie Mountains and the southern part has the wide floodplain of Cheek Creek.
