= Beulah Parson Davis =

American fortune teller

Beulah Clark Parsons Davis (October 31, 1896 in Montgomery County, North Carolina – January 3, 1948 in Durham, North Carolina) was a fortune-telling witch from North Carolina who lived during the Great Depression. She was interviewed by Omar Darrow as part of the North Carolina Federal Writers's Project housed at the University of North Carolina Southern History Collection, which was a New Deal program created to document the regional and local history of North Carolina during the Great Depression.

== Biography ==
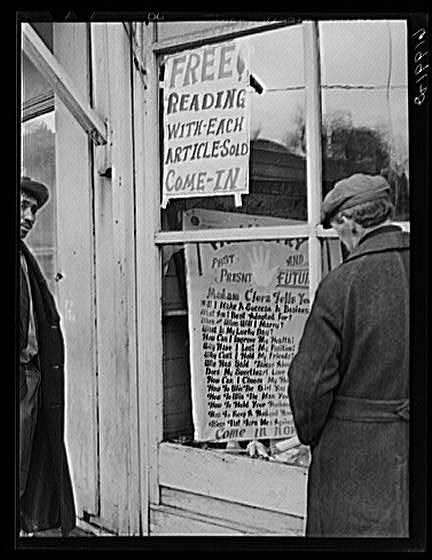
Free readings for fortune telling

Beulah Parson Davis’ birthplace is unknown, but she was most likely born in the Piedmont region of North Carolina. She grew up during the early 1900s on her parents’ dewberry farm, which existed mostly in the sandhills of North Carolina. She started school at the age of five, in a small village school made up of two rooms with each school year lasting around three months.

She married a man she knew from her childhood, and together, they had two children; one daughter and one son. For a living, she and her husband farmed for a few years and then after, owned a little general store on a highway where they built a house nearby. While her husband worked in the fields, she would stay at the house to watch over the store. When their son turned three, the family moved into the city.

During Davis’ marriage, her husband had an open affair, and suggested that his mistress should stay at their house. Davis’ husband was also physically abusive and had reportedly raped his daughter. Upon hearing her daughter's confession about her father's sexual abuse, Davis filed for a divorce.

After the divorce, Davis was physically too weak and fragile to continue any hard labor with the condition her previous husband left her in. Multiple scars remained on her body from the abuse. In order to support her family, she worked as a fortune teller without a license and gave free fortune readings. Due to her own moral values, she never sought to charge her customers. Therefore, she and her children survived off the customers’ spare change or food left as a token of appreciation. This became the family's main source of income, until her daughter, the eldest out of the two children, got a job at a café.

== Social issues ==
=== Education ===
==== Rural versus urban ====
Although Governor Aycock promoted education and helped authorize the establishment of rural schools around the early 1900s in North Carolina, school was still limited for farmers such as Beulah Parsons Davis. Because Davis was raised on a farm, and the likelihood of attending classes was not consistent because “country children might have [had] to miss school at planting time, at hoeing time, and at harvest.” Farming was the priority and every family member was needed to help at the time of harvest.

==== Great Depression ====
Around the Great Depression, education had improved significantly since Davis’ childhood. Instead of 3-month school years, most urban schools of North Carolina had eight- to nine- month school years (3 months longer than the requirements of the state law). Although her daughter quit schooling at the end of eighth grade and the extent of Davis’ son's education remains unknown, he did attend school to the 5th grade at the least, and Davis hoped that he would continue his education. Davis’ daughter worked at a café and brought in a steady source of income, instead of finishing school in order to financially support the family immediately.

=== Domestic violence ===
During the Progressive Era, moral issues of prostitution and alcohol abuse were addressed and believed to contribute to domestic violence. In Davis’ case, her ex-husband was involved in an affair with a woman of “very low morals”, and when Davis indicated any opposition of the idea, she was severely beaten. Many women throughout the Great Depression were abused, but stayed with their spouses for multiple reasons. The blame was often put on women as they were “officially told that domestic violence is the result of men’s depression and women’s lack of sympathy”. In many cases, women were heavily dependent on the income of their spouse. Davis was unemployed, and did not leave the house for the sake of shelter for herself and her kids. Her divorce with her husband was not due to the physical abuse she suffered, but rather the sexual assault her daughter went through.

== Issues of voice ==
The Federal Writers' Project was created in efforts to provide jobs for white collar workers during the Great Depression. Many of the hired writers were unemployed teachers, librarians, and historians, both novice and experienced, which “resulted to uneven qualities” of interviews.

At the time of the FWP's production, interviewers recorded information strictly through notes and memory, as tape recorders were not yet invented. Thus, some useful reports can be missing or not as accurate.

The interview of Beulah Parsons Davis does not provide any information on the exact birthplace or age of Davis. In addition to this absent data, many interviews of the Federal Writers Project have interviewees who shape their story to their advantage. Because the only information available on Beulah Parsons Davis is based on personal experience, any cultural or social evaluation during the era can be highly subjective. The Federal Writers “frequently [distort] the relative importance of historical events”. In the case of Davis, her story reveals little about the political and cultural aspects of the Great Depression.

== Notes ==
=== References ===
- Badger, Anthony J. North Carolina and the New Deal. Raleigh: North Carolina Dept. of Cultural Resources, Division of Archives and History, 1981. Print.
- Bell, John L. Hard Times: Beginnings of the Great Depression in North Carolina, 1929–1933. Raleigh: North Carolina Dept. of Cultural Resources, Division of Archives and History, 1982. Print.
- "Federal Writer's Project (FWP): Southern U.S.A Culture, History & Travel." The Moonlit Road RSS. N.p., 2012. Web. http://themoonlitroad.com/federal-writers-project/. 7 Nov. 2012.
- "Frank Alexander/Loula Richardson Family." Frank Alexander/Loula Richardson Family. N.p., n.d. Web. http://home.earthlink.net/~glendaalex/alexrichardson.htm. 18 Nov. 2012.
- "Public Schools in the Great Depression." Public Schools in North Carolina in the Great Depression. NCpedia, n.d. Web. http://ncpedia.org/public-schools-great-depression. 14 Nov. 2012.
- "Women in the Progressive Era." Women in the Progressive Era. N.p., n.d. Web. http://www.nwhm.org/online-exhibits/progressiveera/wctu.html. 19 Nov. 2012.
