= Abner, North Carolina =

Unincorporated community in North Carolina, US

Coordinates: 35°29′53″N 079°54′28″W

Abner is an unincorporated community in Montgomery County, North Carolina, United States.
