= Biscoe Township, Montgomery County, North Carolina =

Coordinates: 35.32494°N 79.78319°W

- Township
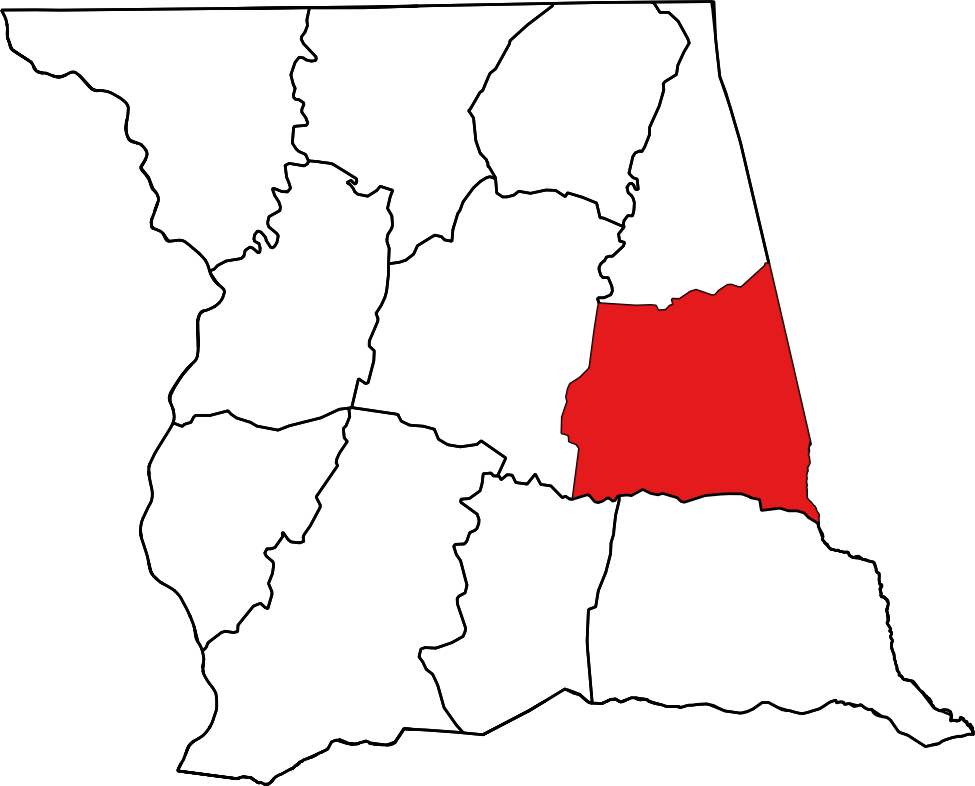
- Location of Biscoe Township in Montgomery County

- Location of Montgomery County in North Carolina
- Country: United States
- State: North Carolina
- County: Montgomery

Area
  - Total: 47.97 sq mi (124.25 km^{2})
- Highest elevation (northwest of Candor, North Carolina): 733 ft (223 m)
- Lowest elevation (Cedar Creek at northwest end of Township): 380 ft (120 m)

Population (2010)
  - Total: 5,765
  - Density: 120.18/sq mi (46.40/km^{2})
- Time zone: UTC-4 (EST)
  - Summer (DST): UTC-5 (EDT)
- Area codes: 910, 472

Biscoe Township, population 5,765, is one of eleven townships in Montgomery County, North Carolina, United States. Biscoe Township is 47.97 square miles (124.2 km^{2}) in size and is located in the east central part of the county. The Towns of Biscoe and Candor are located in this township.

== Geography ==
Biscoe Township is drained mainly by Cedar Creek, Bridgers Creek, and Big Creek, all of which drain to the Little River of the Pee Dee River. The northeast side of the township is drained by Lick Creek and Cabin Creek in the Deep River watershed.
