= North Carolina Highway 134 =

State highway in North Carolina, US

North Carolina Highway 134

Route information
- Maintained by NCDOT
- Length: 19.1 mi (30.7 km)
- Existed: 1966–present

Major junctions
- South end: NC 24 / NC 27 / NC 109 Bus. in Troy
- North end: Dawson Miller Road near Ulah

Location
- Country: United States
- State: North Carolina
- Counties: Montgomery, Randolph

Highway system
- North Carolina Highway System; Interstate; US; State; Scenic
← NC 133	→ NC 135

North Carolina Highway 134 (NC 134) is a primary state highway in the U.S. state of North Carolina. The 19.3-mile (31.1 km) highway provides a more direct route between Troy and Asheboro, via I-73/I-74/US 220 or US 220 Bus.

== Route description ==
NC 134 is a predominantly two-lane rural highway that begins in downtown Troy at the intersection of North Main Street and East Main Street. Going north, it travels next to Denson Creek Golf Course before becoming the eastern edge of the Uwharrie National Forest. A couple of times the national forest goes over the eastern side of the road but not many. At Beane Country Road, the Uwharrie Forest finally goes west of the road as the road continues north. At Dawson Miller Road, NC 134 ends, just 600 feet (180 m) from the I-73/I-74/US 220 interchange.

== History ==
NC 134 was established in 1966 as a new primary route along existing secondary roads; from NC 109 Bus, in Troy, to US 220, south of Ulah. In 1974, it was extended south, overlapping with NC 109 Bus, to its current terminus with NC 24/NC 27/NC 109 Bus.

== Junction list ==
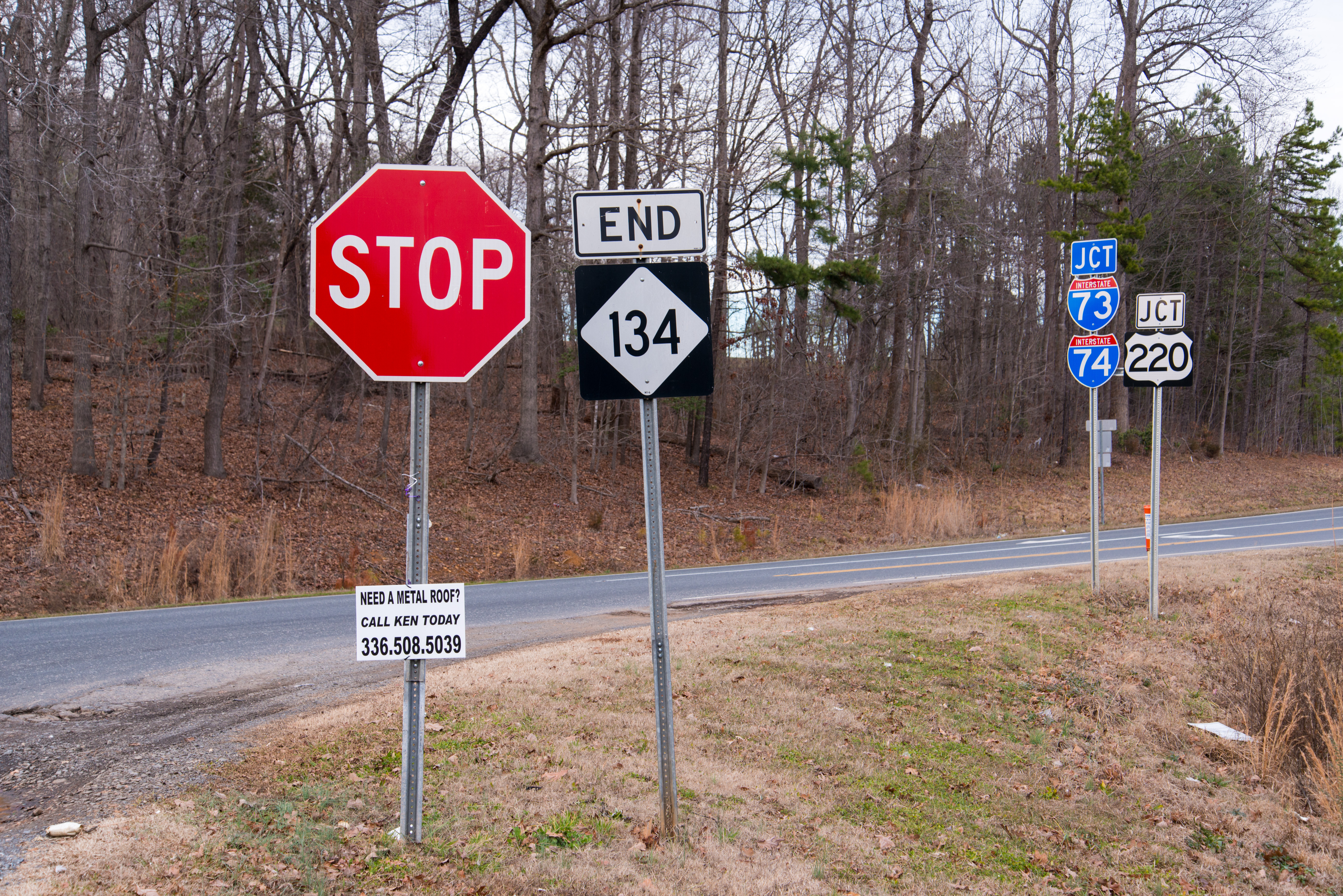
End of NC 134, near I-73/I-74/US 220

County	Location	mi	km	Destinations	Notes
Montgomery	Troy	0.0	0.0	NC 24 / NC 27 / NC 109 Bus. south – Troy, Biscoe	South end of NC 109 Bus overlap
Montgomery	Troy	0.3	0.48	NC 109 Bus. north (Smitherman Street)	North end of NC 109 Bus overlap
Randolph		19.1	30.7	To I-73 / I-74 / US 220 / Dawson Miller Road – Rockingham, Asheboro	
1.000 mi = 1.609 km; 1.000 km = 0.621 mi: Concurrency terminus
