= Troy Residential Historic District =

Historic district in North Carolina, United States

- U.S. National Register of Historic Places
- U.S. Historic district
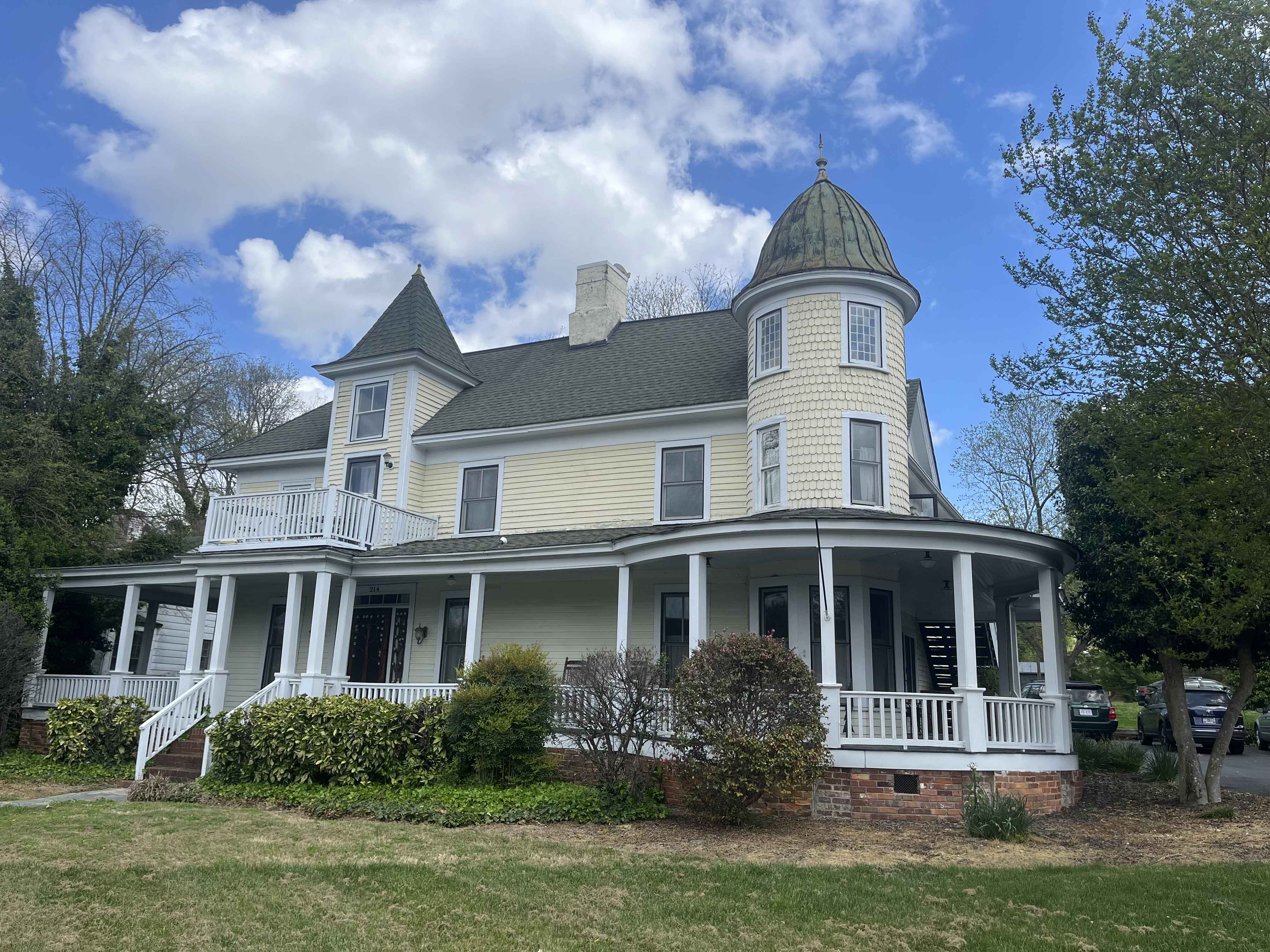
- The Wade-Arscott House in the Troy Residential Historic District

- Location within North Carolina Location within the United States
- Location: E side of N. Main St., from one lot N of Chestnut St. to one lot N of Blair St. and 105 Blair St., Troy, North Carolina
- Coordinates: 35°21′38″N 79°53′37″W
- Area: 6 acres (2.4 ha)
- Built: 1871-1940
- Built by: Linthicum, Hill Carter; Beaman, William B.
- Architectural style: Queen Anne, Classical Revival
- NRHP reference No.: 06000719
- Added to NRHP: August 23, 2006

Troy Residential Historic District is a national historic district located at Troy, Montgomery County, North Carolina. The district encompasses five contributing dwellings in a residential section of Troy. They were built between 1871 and 1940 and includes notable examples of Queen Anne and Classical Revival style architecture. They are the Joseph Reese Blair House (1893, 1903), Mills-Thompson House (1890, 1930), Wade-Arscott House (1871, 1890s), Bruton-Allen House (1895, 1927), and Thompson Rental House (1940).

It was added to the National Register of Historic Places in 2006.

== Gallery ==
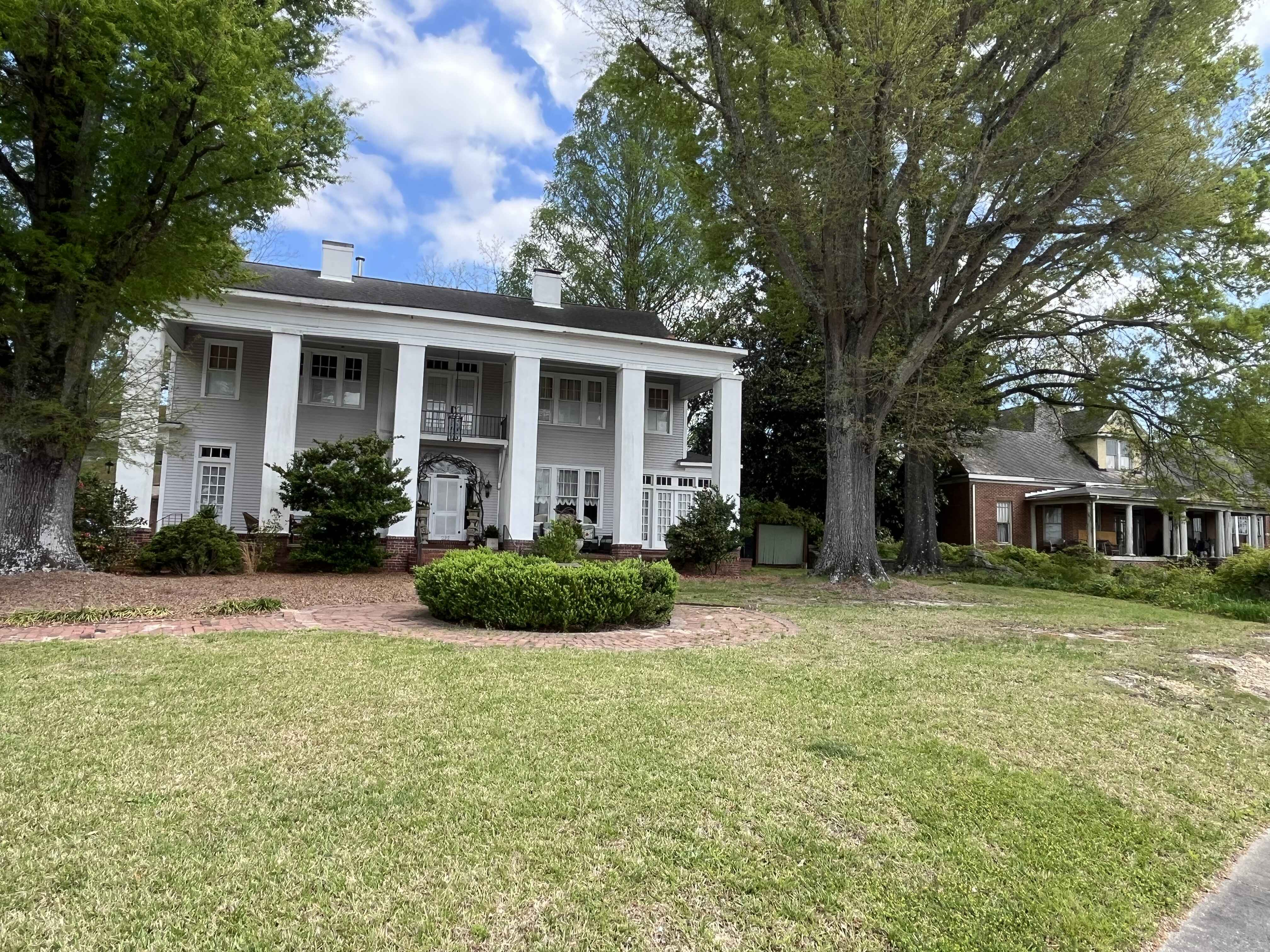
Bruton-Allen House (left) and Mills-Thompson House (right)

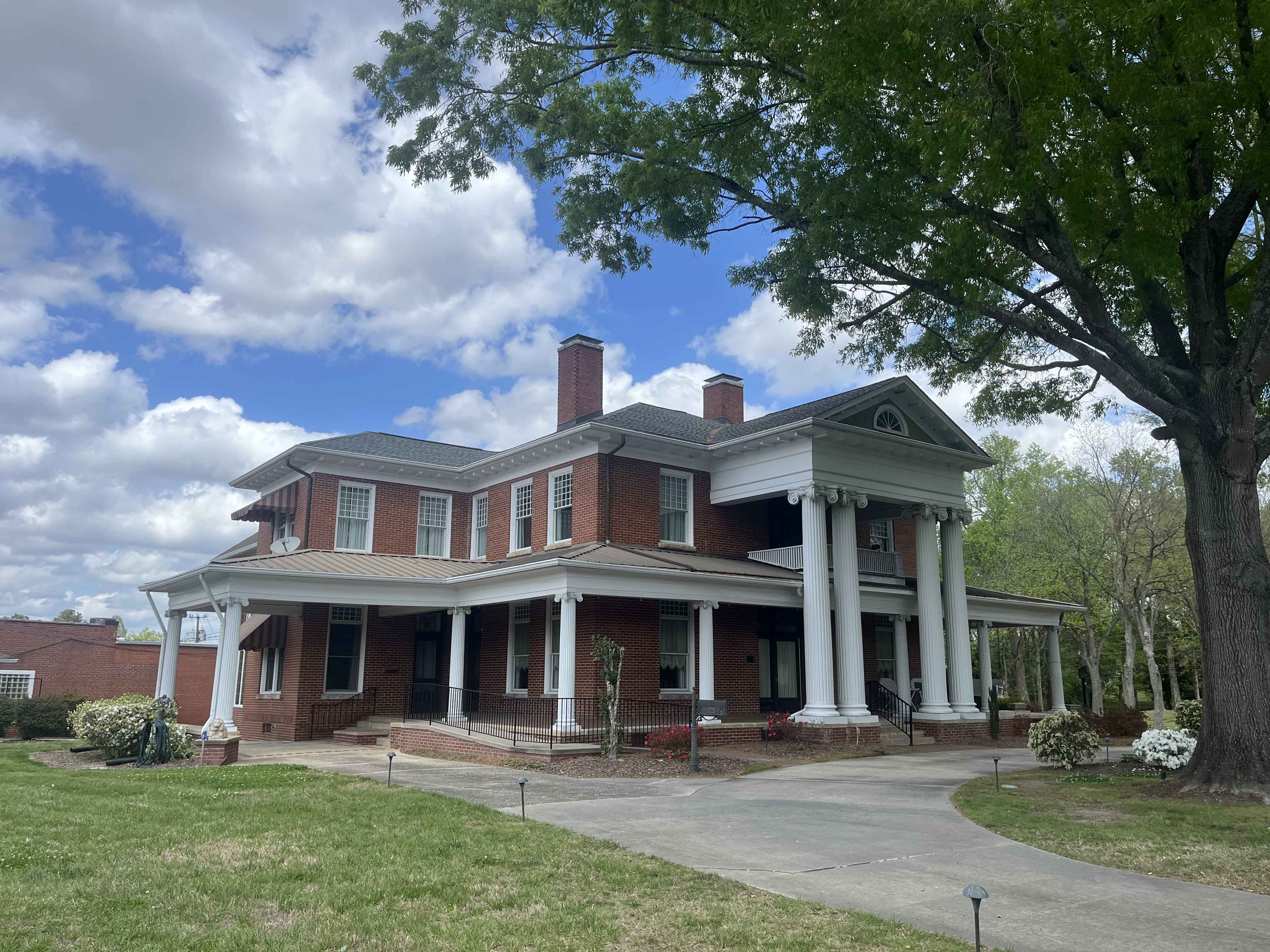
Joseph Reese Blair House

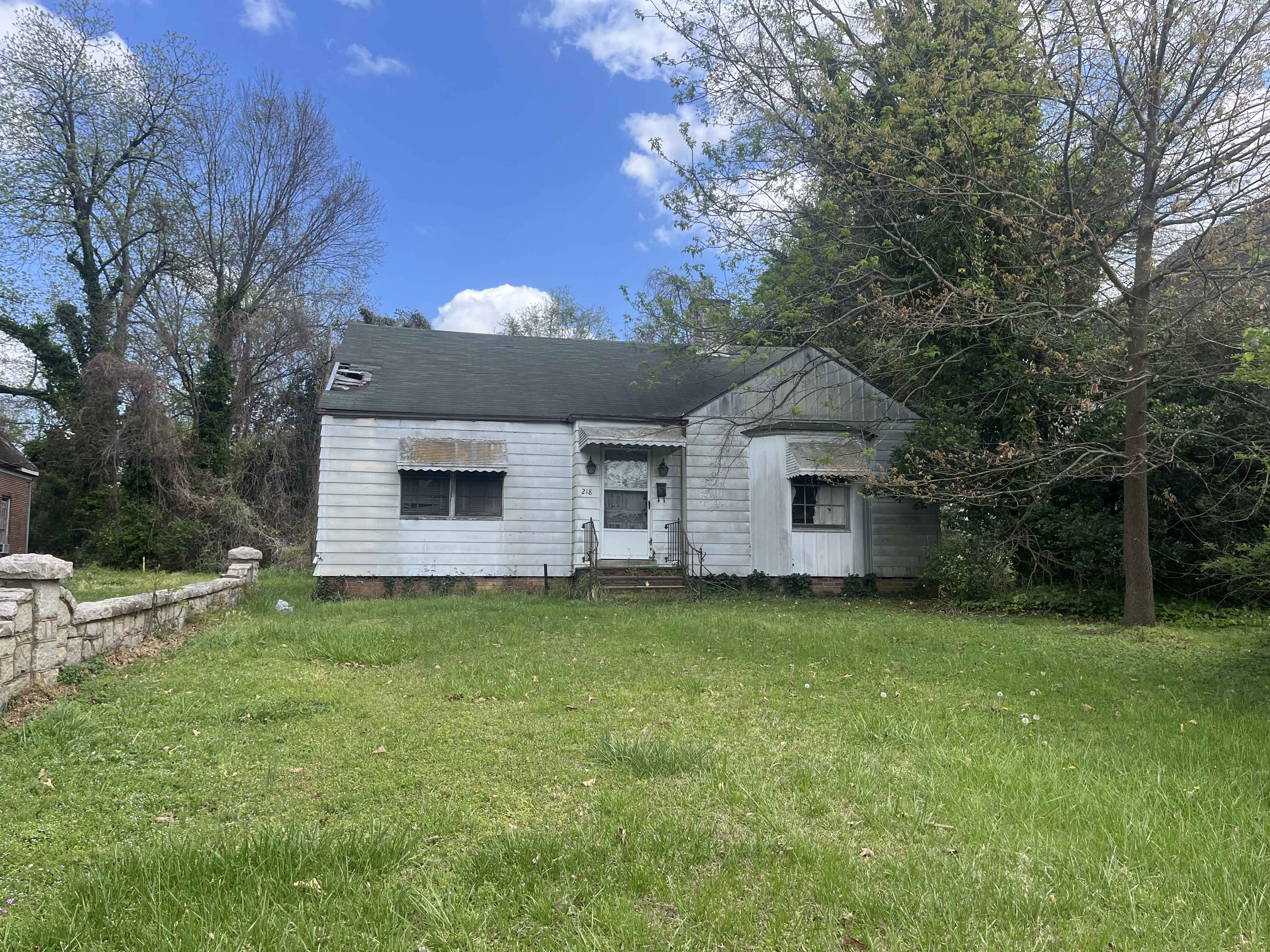
Thompson Rental House
