= Hotel Troy =

- U.S. National Register of Historic Places
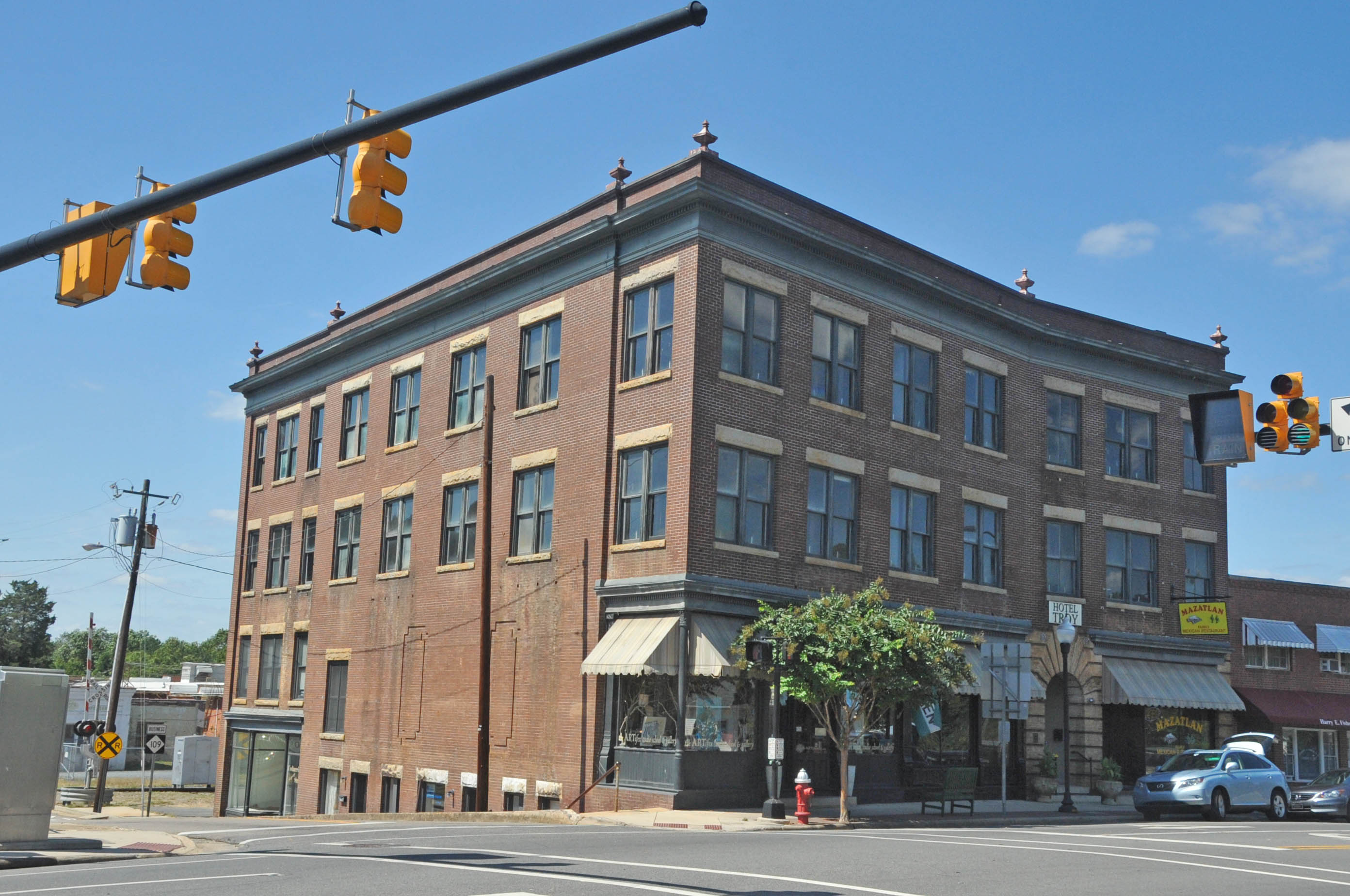
- Hotel Troy, March 2007

- Location within North Carolina Location within the United States
- Location: NW corner of N. Main and Smitherman Sts., Troy, North Carolina
- Coordinates: 35°21′45″N 79°53′44″W
- Area: less than one acre
- Built: 1908-1909
- Architectural style: Classical Revival
- NRHP reference No.: 06000720
- Added to NRHP: August 23, 2006

Hotel Troy is a historic commercial building located in Troy, Montgomery County, North Carolina.

== History ==
It was built in 1908–1909, and is a three-story, seven bay by eight bay, brick building, rising above a full basement with Classical Revival style design elements. The front facade features cast iron pilasters, columns with foliated capitals and cornices.

Originally built for multi-purpose use including a sanitorium, in 1925, rooms in the upper stories were modified for use as hotel rooms and baths. The hotel became a rooming house in the 1950s and finally closed in 1970.

It was added to the National Register of Historic Places in 2006.
