= Town Creek Indian Mound =

National Historic Landmark in North Carolina

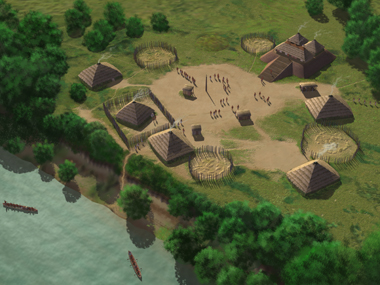
- Artists conception of Town Creek Indian Mound during the late Town Creek-early Leak phases circa 1350 CE.

- Location within North Carolina today Town Creek Indian Mound (the United States)
- 35°10′58.1″N 79°55′46.1″W
- Cultures: South Appalachian Mississippian culture
- Location: Mount Gilead, North Carolina, Montgomery County, North Carolina, USA
- Region: Montgomery County, North Carolina

History
- Built: 1150 CE
- Abandoned: 1400

Site notes
- Architectural styles: platform mound, plaza Number of temples: 1
- Town Creek Indian Mound
- U.S. National Register of Historic Places
- U.S. National Historic Landmark
- NRHP reference No.: 66000594
- Added to NRHP: October 15, 1966
- Excavation dates: 1937-1987
- Archaeologists: Joffre Coe

Town Creek Indian Mound (31 MG 2) is a prehistoric Native American archaeological site located near present-day Mount Gilead, Montgomery County, North Carolina, in the United States. The site, whose main features are a 15 feet high platform mound with a surrounding village and wooden defensive palisade, was built by the Pee Dee, a South Appalachian Mississippian culture people (a regional variation of the Mississippian culture) that developed in the region as early as 980 CE. They thrived in the Pee Dee River region of North and South Carolina during the Pre-Columbian era. The Town Creek site was an important ceremonial site occupied from about 1150—1400 CE. It was abandoned for unknown reasons. It is the only ceremonial mound and village center of the Pee Dee located within North Carolina.

The Pee Dee people shared the Mississippian culture that was characterized in part by building large, earthwork mounds for spiritual and political purposes. They participated in a widespread network of trading that stretched from Georgia through South Carolina, eastern Tennessee, and the mountain and Piedmont regions of North Carolina. The Town Creek site is not large by Mississippian standards. The earthwork mound was built over the remains of a rectangular-shaped earth lodge. The site was declared a National Historic Landmark on October 15, 1966, and is identified as reference number 66000594.

The site is the only national historic landmark in North Carolina to commemorate American Indian culture. It is owned by the North Carolina Department of Natural and Cultural Resources and is operated by the Division of State Historic Sites. Today the Pee Dee people are based in South Carolina, where the state has recognized four bands and one group.

== Background ==
The Pee Dee people built their mound on a low bluff at the confluence of Town Creek and the Little River. The Town Creek site was a major center of Pee Dee habitation, religion and trade. Discussions regarding trade among the local clans were held at Town Creek. Many of the highest-ranking members of the tribe lived, died, and were buried at Town Creek; the elite served both political and religious roles. The site in Montgomery County was the location of important religious ceremonies and tribal feasts.

The clans in the surrounding area would gather at Town Creek for periodic gatherings known as "busks". During a busk, the temple, homes, and grounds of the village were cleaned and repaired as needed. Debts and grievances were resolved. Ritual purification ceremonies took place at the Town Creek Mound. The ceremonies included fasting, bathing, the ingestion of cathartic medicine, and ritual scratching of the skin with the teeth of the garfish. The busk gathering concluded with a celebration known as a poskito, in which the neighboring tribes feasted on new corn. (It is often referred to as the Green Corn Ceremony.) The clans would return to their villages with embers from the sacred fire to stoke their hearths. Scholars believe that the sharing of the fire symbolized unity among the Pee Dee.

== Archaeology ==
Archaeologic excavation began at Town Creek in 1927 on an amateur basis,. In 1937 professional archaeologists began a Works Progress Administration (WPA)-funded project during the Great Depression. The scholarly excavations continued regularly until 1987. In the years prior to 1927, local residents had known the site as a place to collect Indian arrowheads and other relics. With little knowledge of archaeological practices, they likely caused some permanent damage to the site. The amateur group used a scraper pulled by a mule to uncover artifacts, including animal and human bones, and shards of pottery. Today excavations continue on a limited basis.

During the 1930s the land was owned by L. D. Frutchey. He allowed exploratory work to begin in 1937 by a team from the University of North Carolina-Chapel Hill, funded by the WPA of the President Franklin D. Roosevelt administration. Frutchey donated the mound and about an acre of surrounding land to the state of North Carolina, and it was called Frutchey State Park for several years. The name was changed to Town Creek in the 1940s, and it has been administered by the North Carolina Department of Cultural Resources. Town Creek was the first state historic site to be developed for interpretation for visitors.

The Pee Dee left no written record, so the archaeology work has been vital in uncovering and interpreting their history. Joffre Coe of the University of North Carolina-Chapel Hill was the lead archaeologist at Town Creek beginning in 1937. Coe and his team uncovered various artifacts and burial vaults, and also found the remains of a defensive wooden palisade that once surrounded the town and mound. Evidence suggests this palisade was rebuilt at least five times.

Further excavations revealed that the mound, which had not been destroyed over the years despite widespread farming in the area, was the site of three separate structures. The earliest structure was a rectangular earth lodge that had collapsed with age. The second structure was built over the fallen lodge; it was a temple. After the temple burned, the Pee Dee built another ceremonial structure on the same spot on top of the mound. This building had an eastward-facing ramp that provided access to the surrounding plaza.

The flat, graded plaza in front of the mound served as the site for ceremonies and other public meetings. The archaeologists discovered the remains of several support buildings in the vicinity of the plaza, including a burial and mortuary house. It is believed that the burial house was significant for a specific clan. The mound, burial, mortuary houses and many family homes were surrounded by a protective palisade. The remains of two gates and guard towers have been discovered on the north and south ends of the palisade, with archaeological evidence pointing to the successive construction and destruction of at least five protective walls. This is a pattern seen at other Mississippian sites, such as Cahokia, a major center located in present-day southwestern Illinois across the Mississippi River and near Saint Louis, Missouri.

A total of 563 burials have been found at Town Creek Indian Mound; they are believed to be Pee Dee people. Many of the burial sites appear to have been fairly simple and common, with the bodies casually placed in the graves. Some of the remains were found buried with the bodies fully extended, while others may have been re-buried in a bundle of bones. The remains of young children and infants have been found tightly wrapped in deerskins and placed within large pottery vessels which archeologists have called burial urns.

Coe served as the lead archaeologist for Town Creek Indian Mound for more than 50 years. His extensive work at Town Creek has resulted in the development of deep knowledge about the past of Town Creek. Traditionally, historic excavations have taken place over a much shorter period of time, and artifacts are often moved to a distant research facility. Coe maintained his center of operations at Town Creek for over 50 years, allowing him to establish a consistent plan of research and study.

== Facilities ==
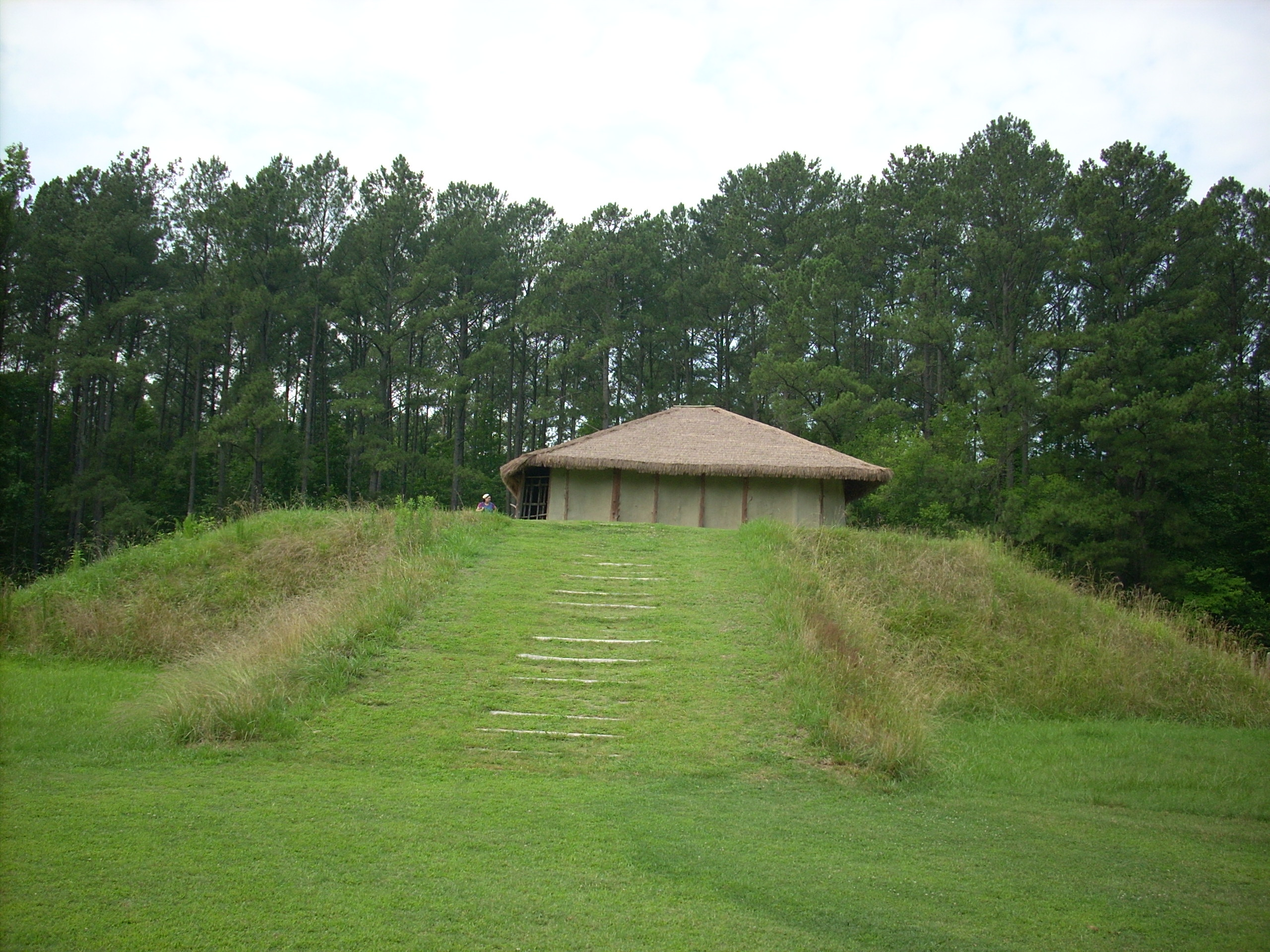
Platform mound at Town Creek with reconstructed temple

The state has developed several facilities at Town Creek Indian Mound that are open to the public. It built a reconstructed ceremonial center, restoring the platform mound and reconstructing a temple on it. It also reconstructed a minor temple and the mortuary.

The visitor center houses interpretive exhibits, audiovisual programs, and a gift shop. The visitor center, minor temple, and mortuary are handicapped accessible.

Several trails and outdoor monuments are located on the property. Fourteen picnic tables are located on the grounds.

== Tours ==
Group tours are available with advance scheduling. Groups are led through some hands-on activities. Various special events held throughout the year focus on the lifestyle of the Pee Dee. Self-guided tours of the rebuilt structures and mound occur during normal operational hours, and admission to Town Creek Indian Mound is free.

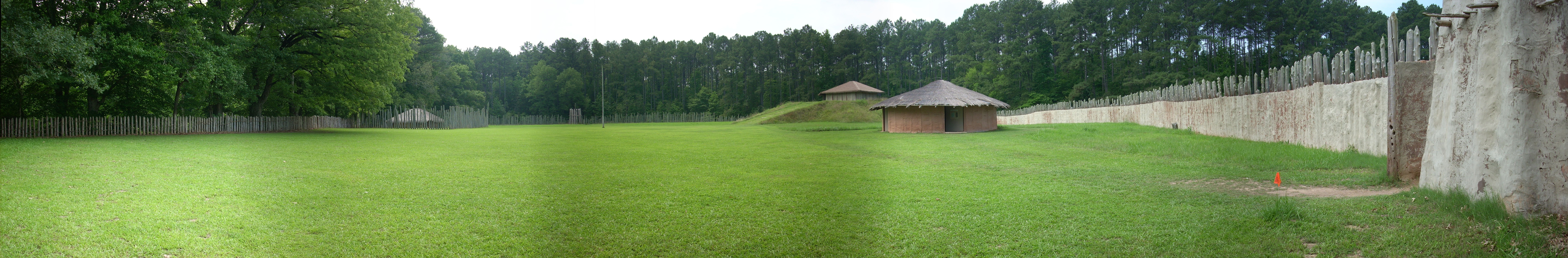
Panoramic view of the park, left to right: palisades, "minor" temple, post used for ball games, "major" temple on the mound, burial hut and more palisades.

== See also ==
- List of Mississippian sites
- Mississippian culture
- List of National Historic Landmarks in North Carolina
- National Register of Historic Places listings in Montgomery County, North Carolina
