= Montgomery County Courthouse (North Carolina) =

- U.S. National Register of Historic Places
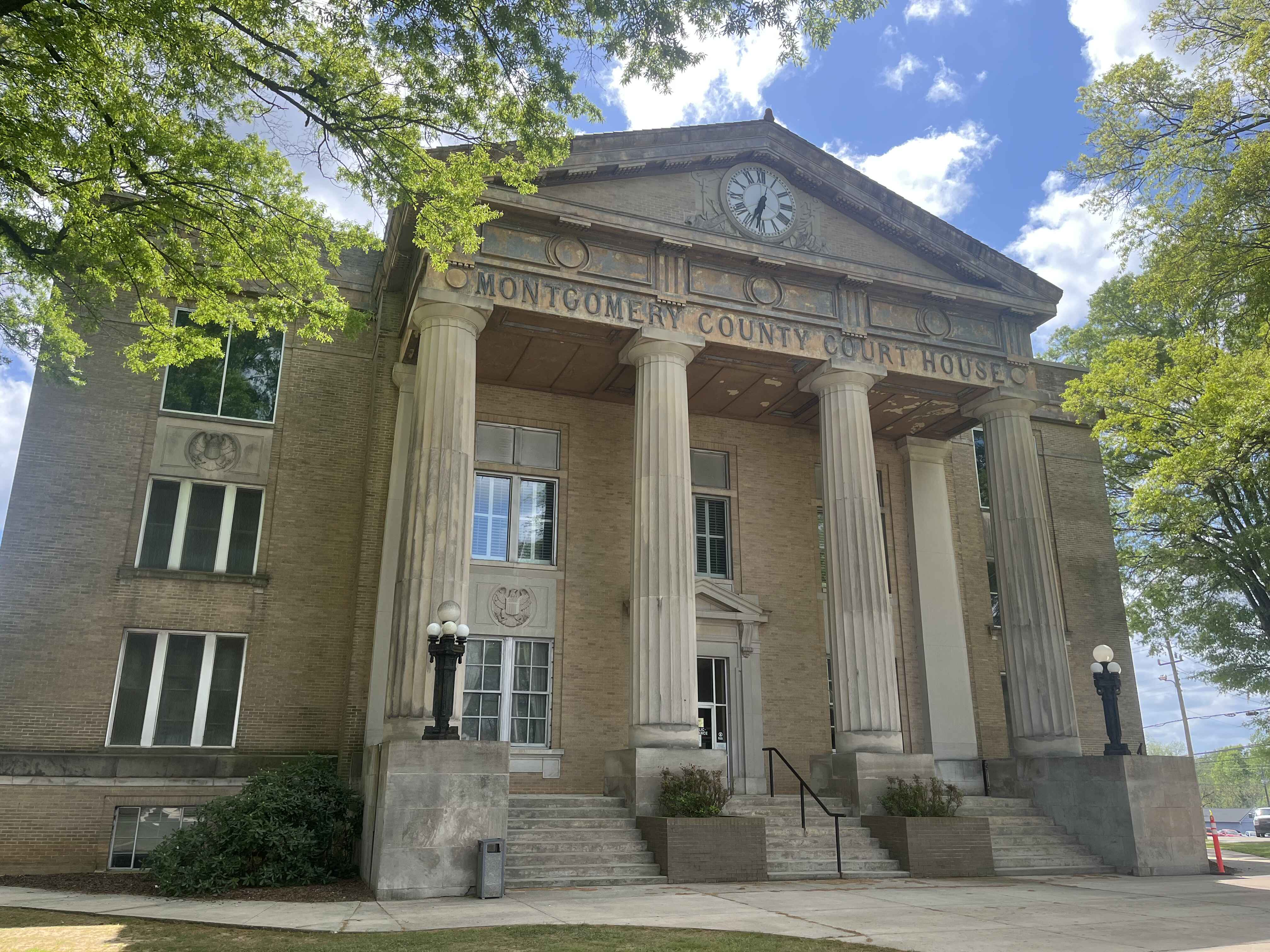
- Montgomery County Courthouse, April 2026

- Location within North Carolina Location within the United States
- Location: E. Main St. between S. Main and S. Pearl Sts., Troy, North Carolina
- Coordinates: 35°21′29″N 79°53′36″W
- Area: 1 acre (0.40 ha)
- Built: 1921
- Architect: Benton & Benton
- Architectural style: Classical Revival
- MPS: North Carolina County Courthouses TR
- NRHP reference No.: 79001737
- Added to NRHP: May 10, 1979

Montgomery County Courthouse is a historic courthouse located at Troy, Montgomery County, North Carolina. It was designed by the architectural firm of Benton & Benton and built in 1921. It is a three-story, rectangular tan brick building in the Classical Revival style. It features a pedimented tetrastyle Doric order pedimented portico with a clock in the tympanum of the pediment. The interior was remodeled in 1976.

It was added to the National Register of Historic Places in 1979.

== Gallery ==
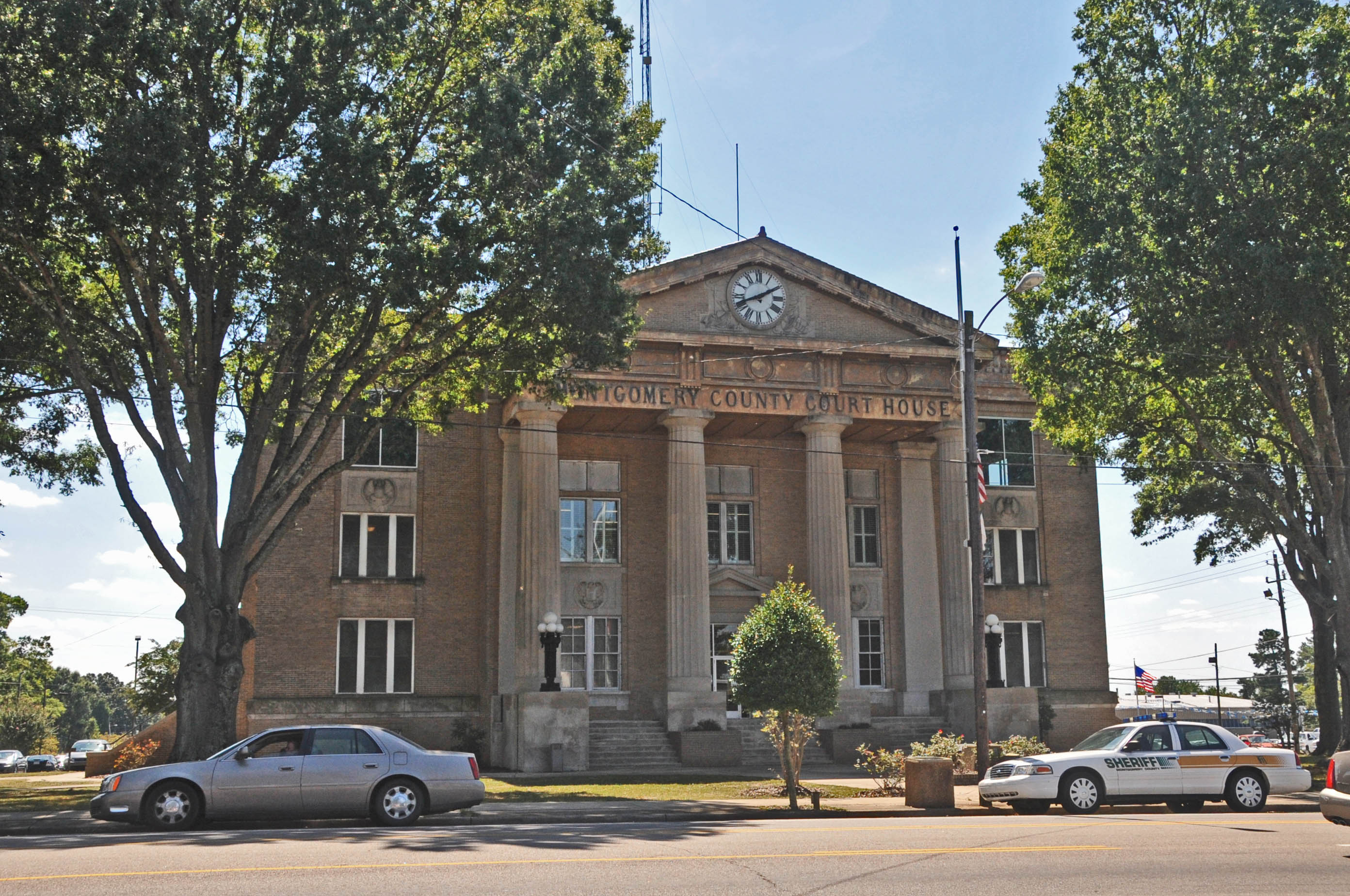
Montgomery County Courthouse, March 2007

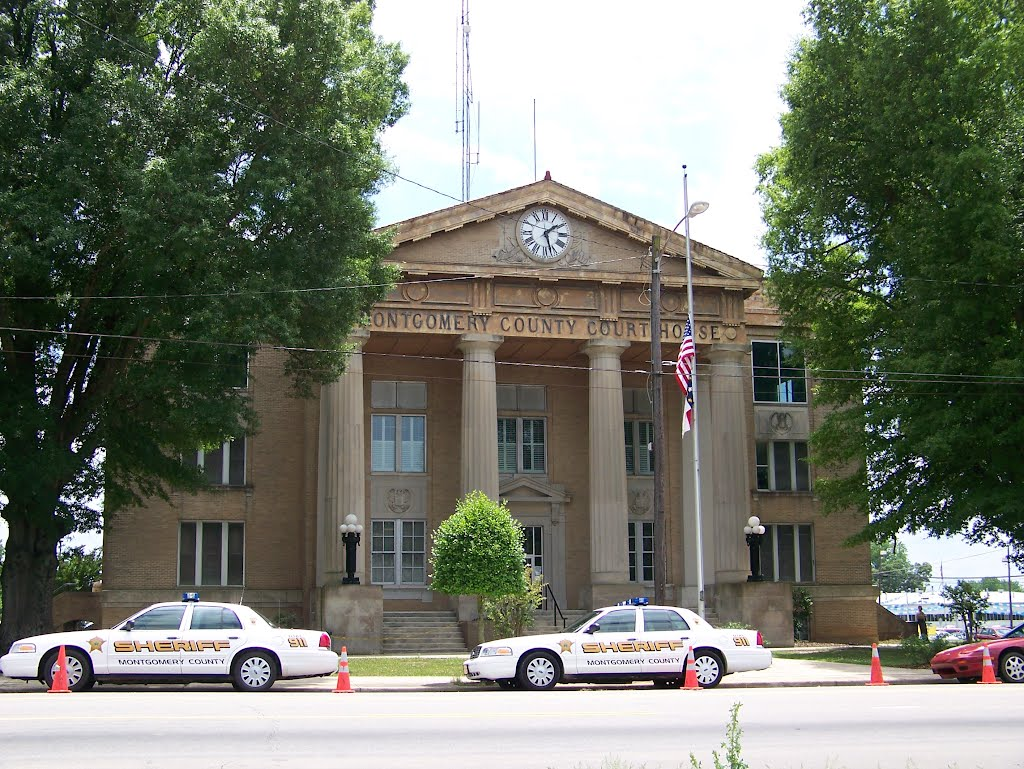
Montgomery County Courthouse, May 2012

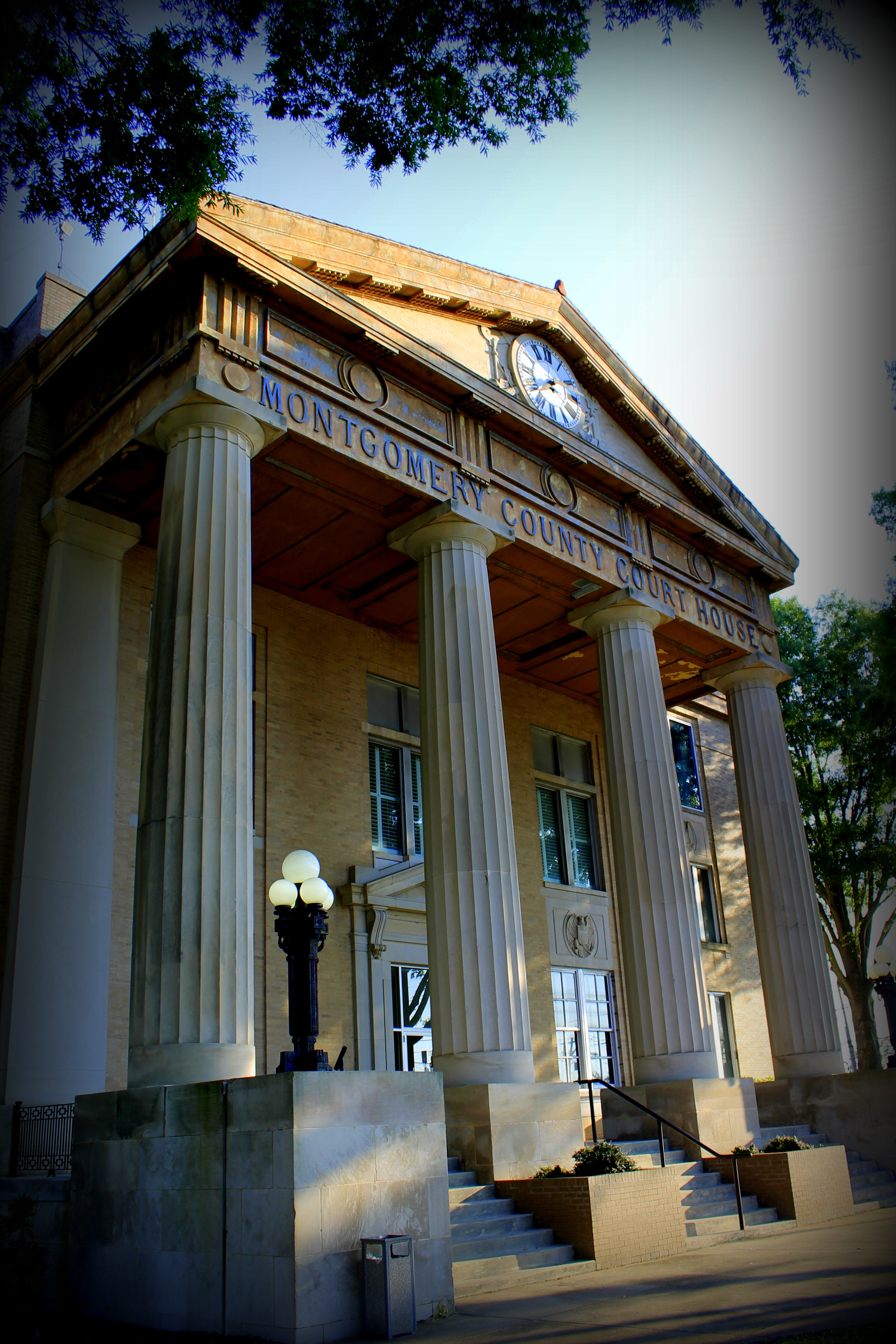
Montgomery County Courthouse, June 2014

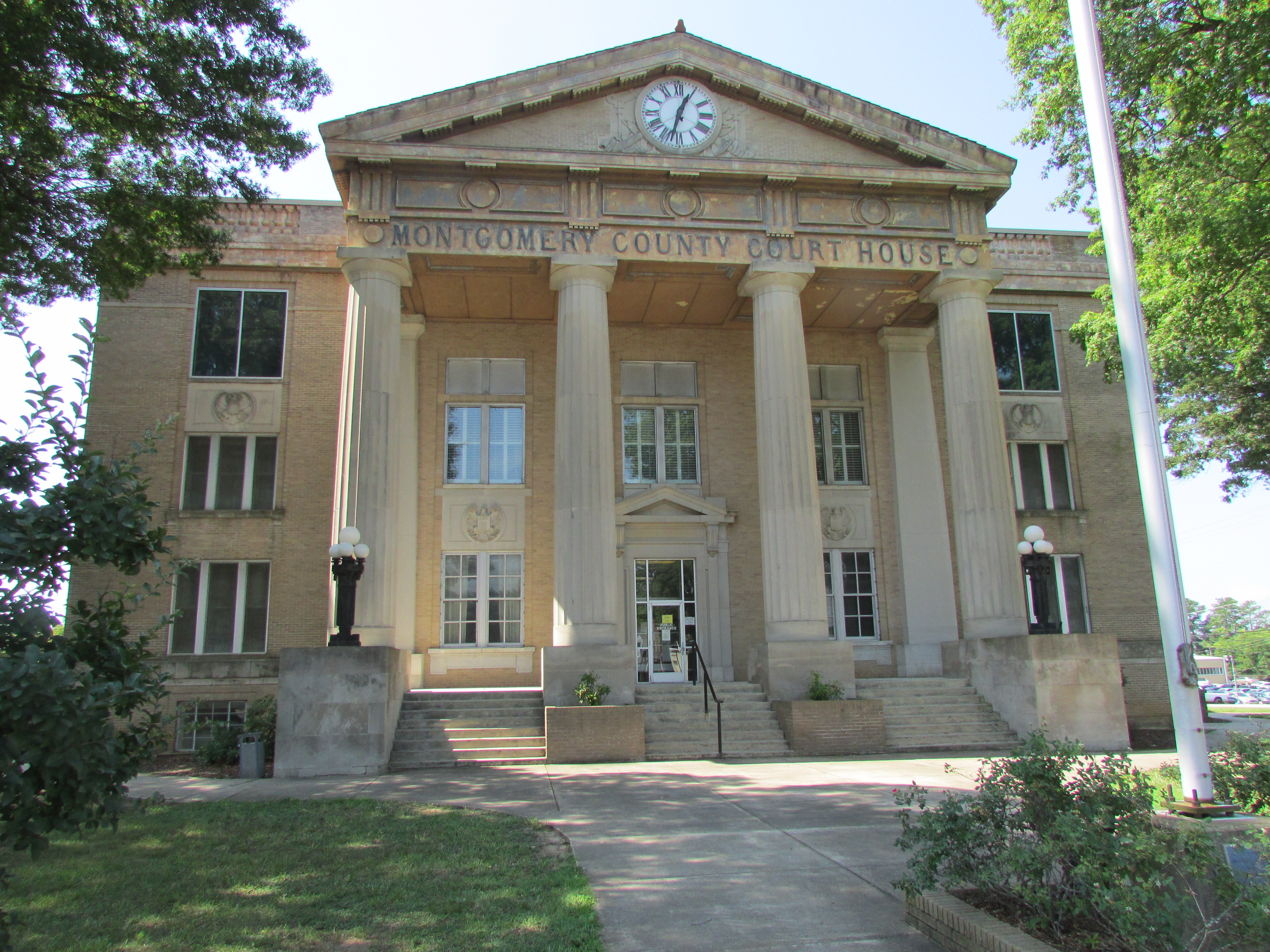
Montgomery County Courthouse, July 2018
