= Carolina Beach State Park =

State park in North Carolina, United States

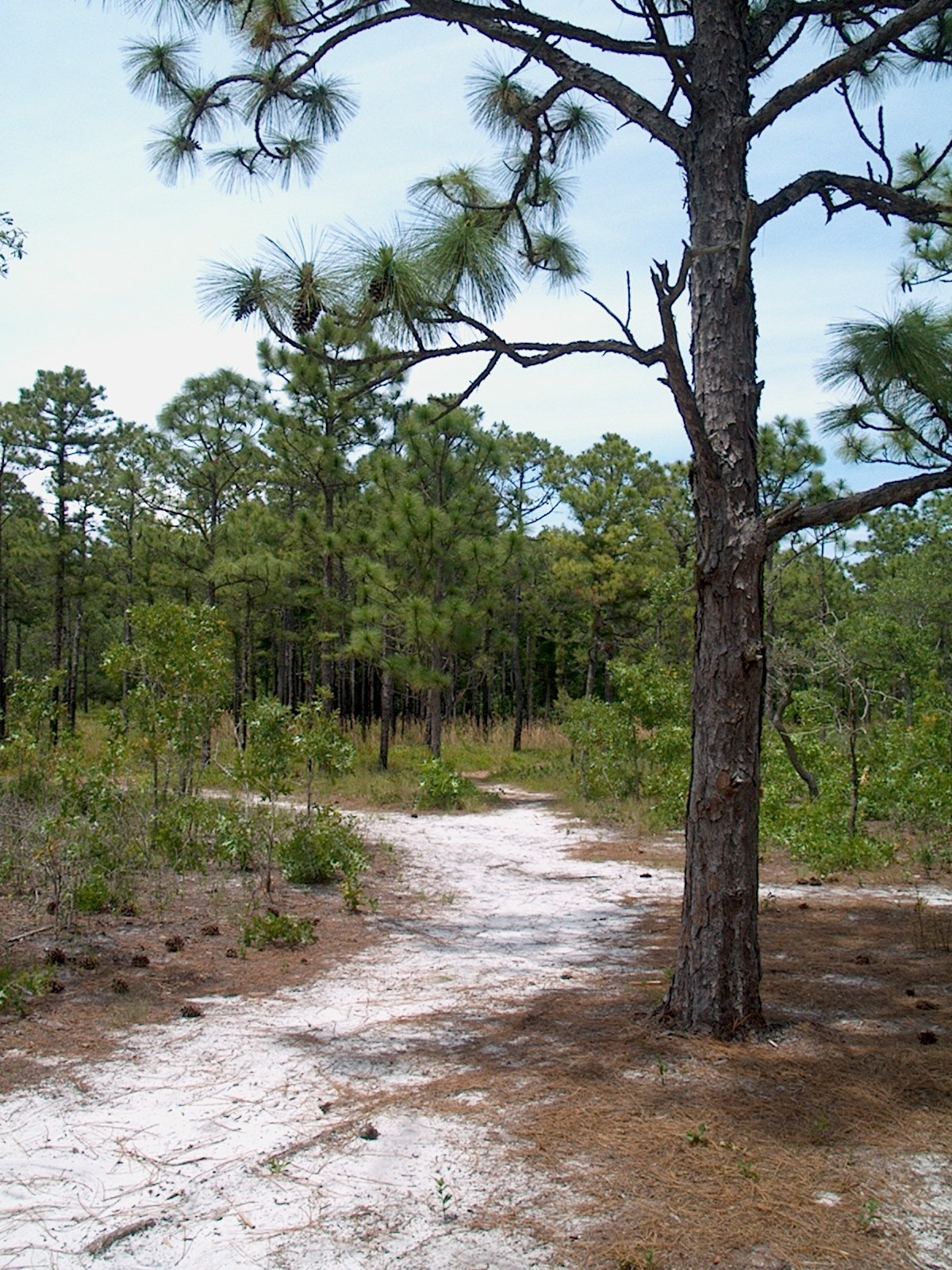
- A sandy trail in Carolina Beach State Park

- Location within North Carolina Location within the United States
- Interactive map of Carolina Beach State Park
- Location: New Hanover County, North Carolina, United States
- Coordinates: 34°02′50″N 77°54′26″W
- Area: 761 acres (308 ha)
- Established: 1969
- Administrator: North Carolina Division of Parks and Recreation
- Website: Official website

Carolina Beach State Park is a North Carolina state park in New Hanover County, North Carolina. It covers 761 acres (3.08 km^{2}) on Pleasure Island. The state owns 420 acres (1.7 km^{2}) of the park in fee simple, and the remainder of park land is leased from the Department of the Army. The park is located along the Cape Fear River and Snow's Cut (part of the Intracoastal Waterway).

Pocosin wetlands, a type of wetland that supports rare carnivorous plant species, are found in the park. Carnivorous plants found at this park include Venus flytraps, pitcher plants, butterworts and bladderworts.

The park features six miles of hiking trails. Other amenities include a marina, campsites, picnic area, and a visitor center featuring natural history exhibits.

== Gallery ==
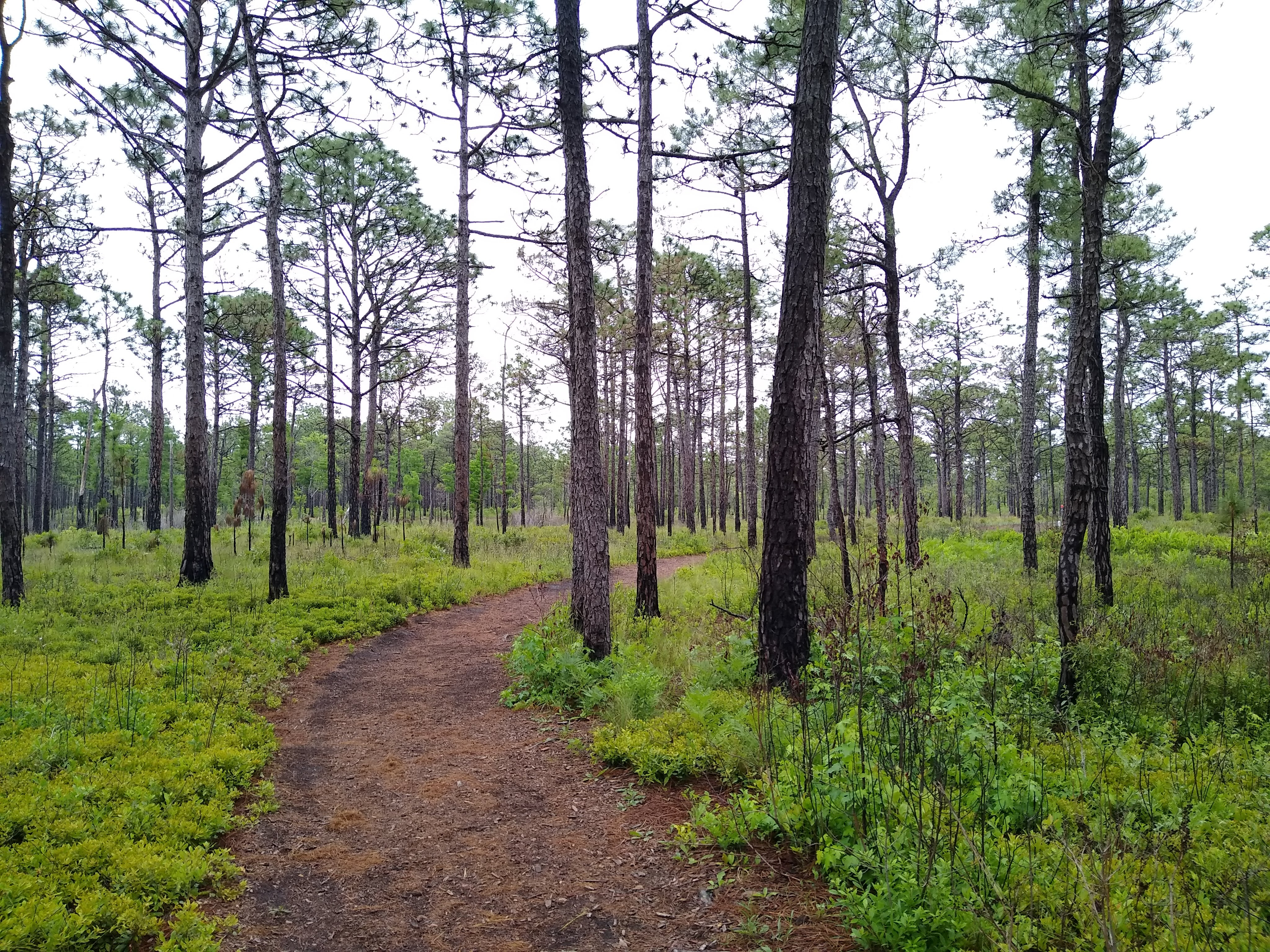
The Flytrap Trail

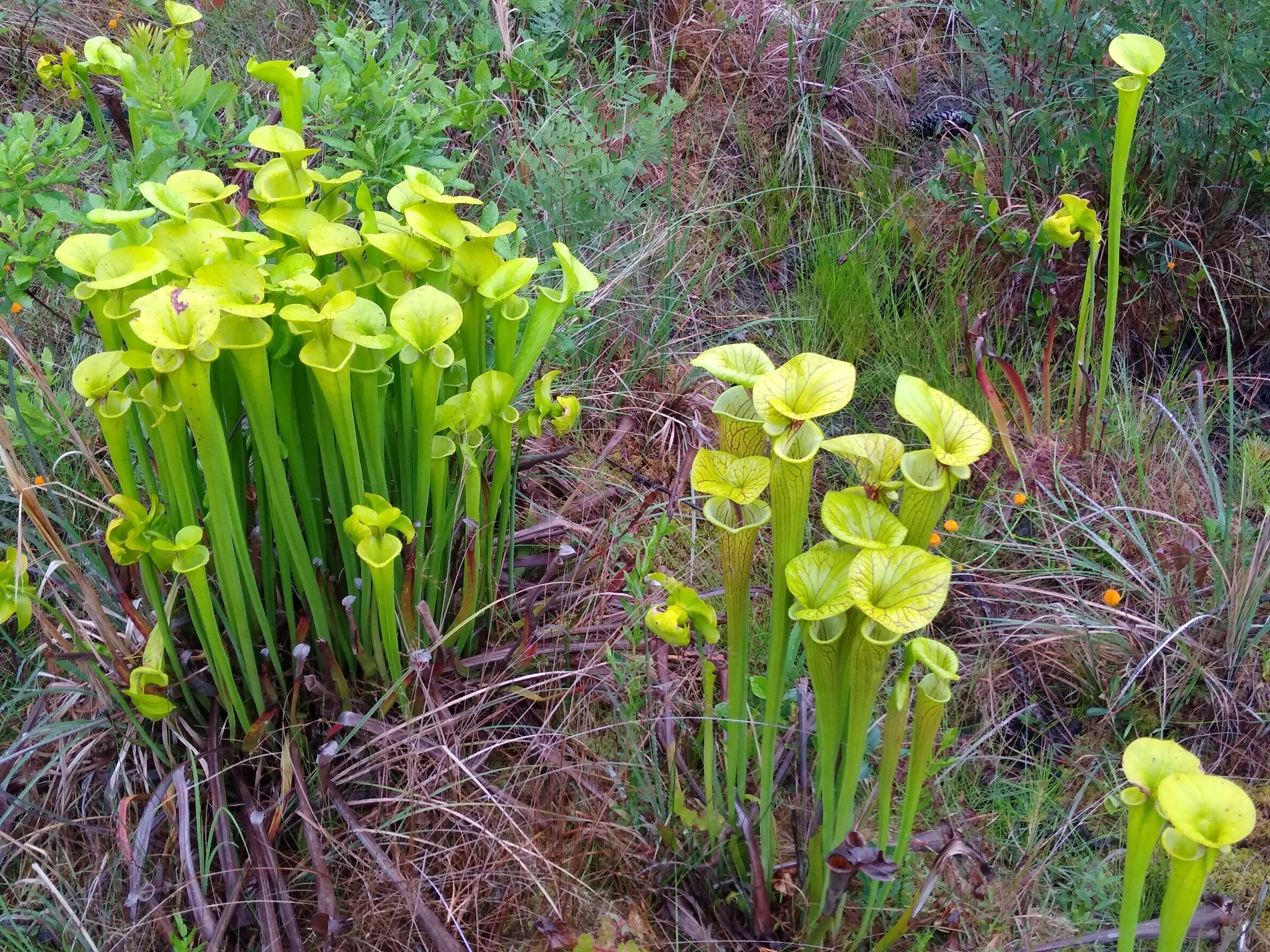
Pitcher plants

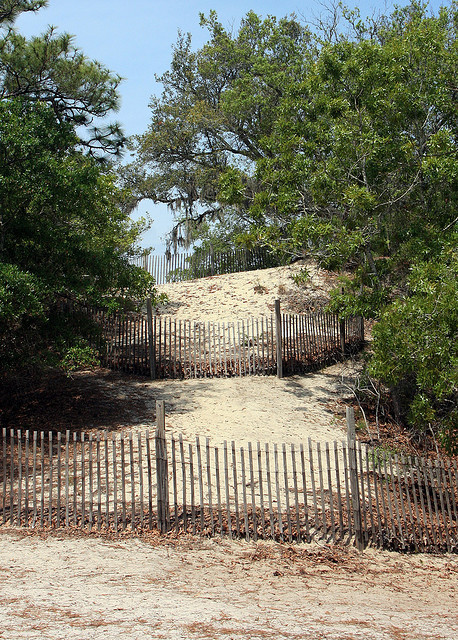
Sugarloaf sand dune

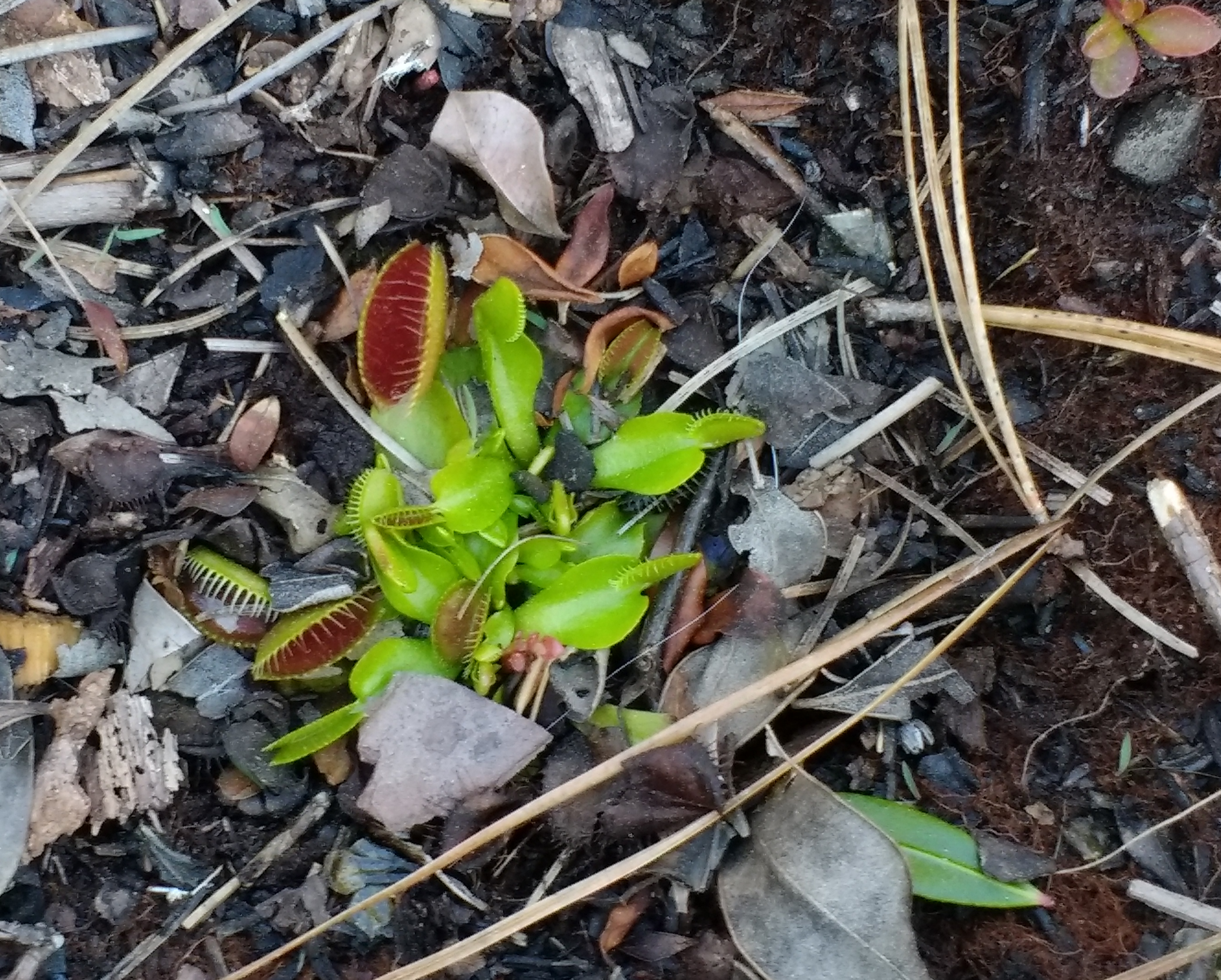
Venus flytrap
