= Ophir, North Carolina =

Unincorporated community in North Carolina, US

Coordinates: 35°28′41″N 79°58′44″W

Ophir is an unincorporated community in the north-central part of Montgomery County, North Carolina, United States.

== Location ==
Ophir is located on State Road 1303 (Ophir Road), with State Road 1301 (Low Water Bridge Road), State Road 1306 (Flint Hill Road), and State Road 1134 (Tower Road) junctioning within the community. Ophir is five miles northeast of N.C. Hwy.109 (Montgomery County), six miles southeast of N.C. Hwy 49 (Davidson County), six miles west of N.C. Hwy. 134 (Montgomery County), and eight miles south of N.C. Hwy. 49 (Randolph County).

Ophir is approximately one mile south of Randolph County, five miles southeast of Davidson County, seven miles east of Stanly County, eleven miles west of Moore County, and twenty-one miles north of Richmond County.

The elevation of the community of Ophir is 518 feet (158 m) above sea level.

== History ==
Ophir was named after Ophir, the biblical region where gold was produced for King Solomon's temple.

The small community was settled during the mid-19th century, during the gold boom in the state of North Carolina.

=== Gold ===
Very little mining was done in Montgomery County during the Civil War. Manpower was short. Men were away at war and those left at home were focused on taking care of the farms and their families. In 1891, there were 35 mines in operation in the county, but a short while later in 1896, the N.C. Geographical Survey named only 18 mines in use. In the northwest corner of the county there were many regional mines, including several in the Ophir area. These mines all had a major impact and played important roles in the county's mining history.

The Russell Mine, one of the larger producers in Montgomery County, had a total production of around 15,000 ounces of lode gold. This mine included several open pits and underground workings that attained a depth of over 200 ft (61 m). The largest pit, "Big Cut", is about 300 ft (91 m). long, 150 ft (46 m). wide, and 60 ft (18 m). deep. As a whole, material excavated from this pit is said to have averaged $2.00 to the ton in gold. The entire mass is gold-bearing but only certain parts of it are rich enough to work, and even these parts are of low grade except for rich seams that appear and disappear abruptly. Ore is difficult to distinguish from waste, visually. Ore grades averaged about 3.4 grams per tonne (g/t), with higher-grade zones reported. The total production of the Russell Mine is reported to have exceeded $300,000.

The Steel Mine is located just west of Ophir along the Uwharrie River. It was a lode gold mine. The rock in the vicinity is the argillaceous slate, but according to some it is silicified schist. At the Steel Mine ore consists of thin seams of free gold, galena, sphalerite, chalcopyrite, and pyrite. These seams are conformable with the slaty cleavage or schistosity. Gold is said to have been discovered here about 1832, and the mine appears to have been worked extensively before 1853. Someone said that at this mine, gold digging amounted to mania for farmers were locating gold in almost every hill. However, the early history of the mine is obscure. Production data are fragmentary and are based on estimates. The only year for which production data are available is 1887, when $150,000 (about 75,000 ounces) in gold was produced. In 1876 the property was purchased by an English company, and until 1884 the ore was treated in Chilean mills. Mining journals for 1886 and 1887 note the repairing of old shafts and buildings of a new mill containing at first 20 stamps and later 40 stamps. One shaft was 135 ft (41 m). deep. Assay of ore taken from rich seams ranged from 20 to several hundred ounces of gold to the ton, and the ore from a few assayed more than 100 ounces of silver per ton. As late as 1934, a mill containing 10 stamps, a boiler, an engine, a roaster and other accessories remained on site going to ruin. Today, the Steel Mine is nearly inaccessible and the 1832 structures are in total ruins.

== Ophir today ==
Ophir is located in the heart of the Uwharrie National Forest in the Uwharrie Mountains. There are numerous campgrounds and hiking trails, hunting and fishing spots, and recreational services nearby for the outdoorsman's comfort. Badin Lake and Lake Tillery are only a few miles away, and the Uwharrie River runs through it.
