= Troy, North Carolina =

- Town
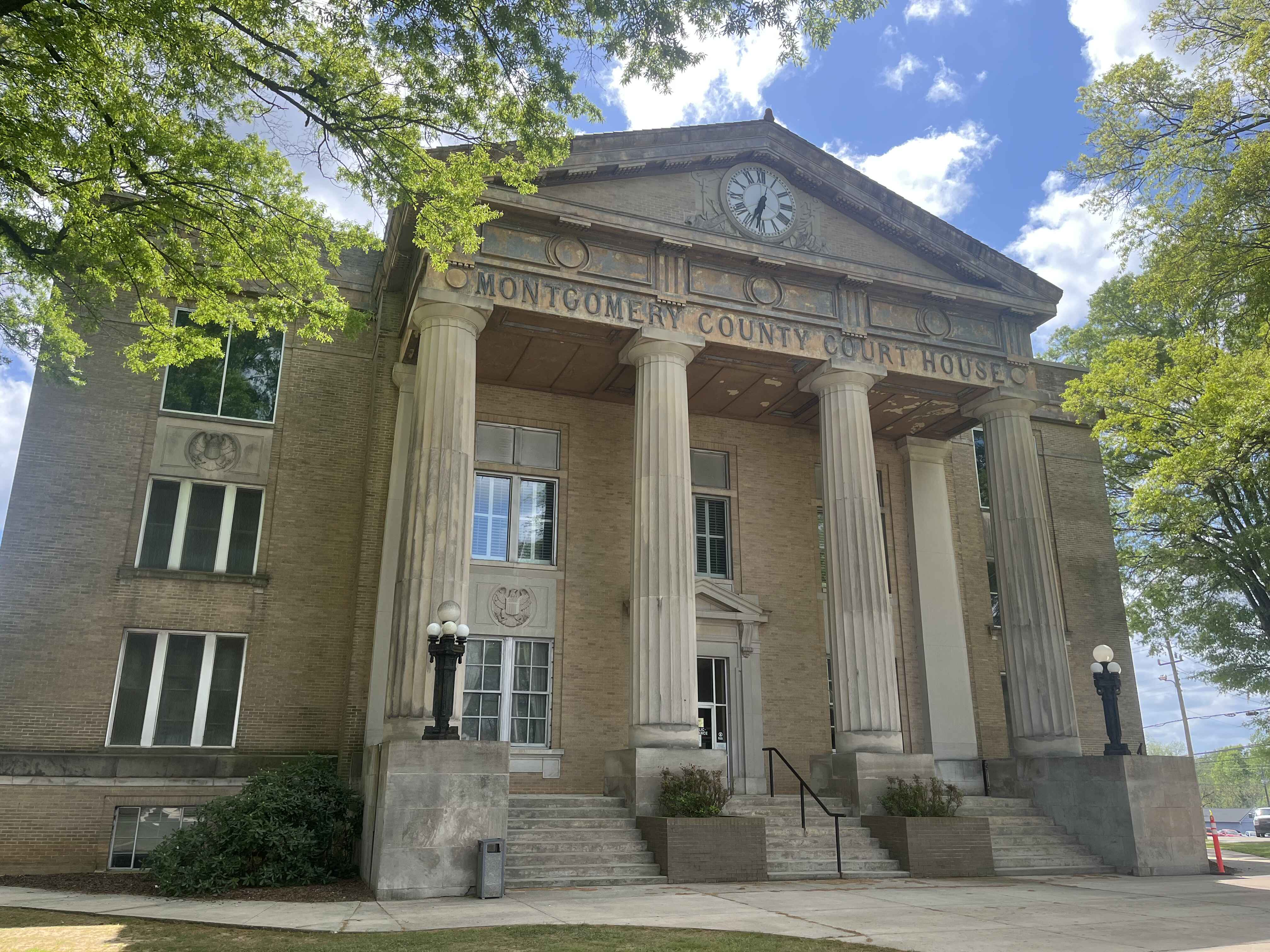
- Montgomery County Courthouse

- Seal
- Motto: "Gateway to the Uwharries"
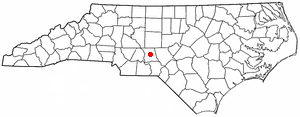
- Location in North Carolina
- Coordinates: 35°21′38″N 79°53′47″W
- Country: United States
- State: North Carolina
- County: Montgomery

Area
  - Total: 3.70 sq mi (9.59 km^{2})
  - Land: 3.66 sq mi (9.48 km^{2})
  - Water: 0.042 sq mi (0.11 km^{2})
- Elevation: 623 ft (190 m)

Population (2020)
  - Total: 2,850
  - Density: 778.8/sq mi (300.68/km^{2})
- Time zone: UTC-5 (Eastern (EST))
  - Summer (DST): UTC-4 (EDT)
- ZIP Code: 27371
- Area codes: 910, 472
- FIPS code: 37-68520
- GNIS feature ID: 2406760
- Website: troy.nc.us

Troy is a town in Montgomery County, North Carolina, United States. The population was 2,850 at the 2020 census, down from 3,188 in 2010. It is the county seat of Montgomery County.

== History ==
Troy lies in an area once known for its vast longleaf pine forests; much of the town's early development came from the harvesting of those trees for lumber and turpentine. Originally known as "West Old Fields", the name was changed to Troy in 1843 when the county seat of Montgomery County was moved there from Old Lawrenceville. The town was incorporated in 1853.

The coming of the Asheboro and Aberdeen Railroad as well as the gold mining industry surrounding the town accelerated growth in the late 19th century. By the 20th century textile mills and lumber mills were contributing heavily to Troy's economy.

The Hotel Troy, Montgomery County Courthouse, and Troy Residential Historic District are listed on the National Register of Historic Places.

== Geography ==
Troy is in central Montgomery County, 20 miles (32 km) east of Albemarle, 26 miles (42 km) south of Asheboro, 30 miles (48 km) west of Carthage, and 31 miles (50 km) north-northeast of Wadesboro. North Carolina Highways 24 and 27 pass south of Troy, with their business routes passing through the center of town. Highway 24/27 leads east to Biscoe and Carthage and west to Albemarle and eventually Charlotte, 60 miles (97 km) distant. North Carolina Highway 109 passes through the west side of Troy, leading northwest 25 miles (40 km) to Denton and south-southwest to Mount Gilead and Wadesboro. Highway 134 (North Main Street) has its southern terminus in Troy and leads north to Asheboro.

According to the U.S. Census Bureau, the town of Troy has a total area of 3.7 square miles (9.6 km^{2}), of which 0.04 square miles (0.10 km^{2}), or 1.16%, are water. The town sits on a hilltop which drains southwest toward Warner Creek, a tributary of Rocky Creek, part of the Little River watershed leading to the Pee Dee River; north to Suck Branch, a tributary of Densons Creek, also leading to the Little River; and to the southeast by direct tributaries of the Little River.

Troy, along with most of Montgomery County, lies within the proclamation boundary of the Uwharrie National Forest. The town lies at the eastern edge of the Uwharrie Mountains, a hilly region with summits generally in the 800 to 900 feet (240 to 270 m) range.

== Demographics ==
Historical population
Census	Pop.	Note	%±
1870	67		—
1880	130		94.0%
1900	878		—
1910	1,055		20.2%
1920	1,102		4.5%
1930	1,522		38.1%
1940	1,861		22.3%
1950	2,213		18.9%
1960	2,346		6.0%
1970	2,429		3.5%
1980	2,702		11.2%
1990	3,404		26.0%
2000	3,430		0.8%
2010	3,189		−7.0%
2020	2,850		−10.6%
U.S. Decennial Census

=== 2020 census ===
As of the 2020 census, Troy had a population of 2,850. The median age was 37.1 years. 23.0% of residents were under the age of 18 and 15.6% were 65 years of age or older. For every 100 females there were 111.9 males, and for every 100 females age 18 and over there were 114.6 males.

0.0% of residents lived in urban areas, while 100.0% lived in rural areas.

Troy racial composition
Race	Number	Percentage
White (non-Hispanic)	1,375	48.25%
Black or African American (non-Hispanic)	939	32.95%
Native American	11	0.39%
Asian	37	1.3%
Other/Mixed	67	2.35%
Hispanic or Latino	421	14.77%

There were 1,061 households in Troy, including 547 families. Of all households, 34.6% had children under age 18 living in them, 32.7% were married-couple households, 18.9% had a male householder with no spouse or partner present, and 42.7% had a female householder with no spouse or partner present. About 33.6% of all households were made up of individuals, and 17.0% had someone living alone who was 65 years of age or older.

There were 1,204 housing units, of which 11.9% were vacant. The homeowner vacancy rate was 2.5% and the rental vacancy rate was 6.1%.

=== 2010 census ===
As of the census of 2010, there were 3,189 people, 1,115 households, and 704 families residing in the town. The population density was 1,156.8 inhabitants per square mile (446.6/km^{2}). There were 1,209 housing units at an average density of 407.7 per square mile (157.4/km^{2}). The racial makeup of the town was 58.9% White, 31.8% African American, 0.73% Native American, 1.0% Asian, 3.32% from other races, and 1.5% from two or more races. Hispanic or Latino of any race were 10.3% of the population.

There were 1,108 households, out of which 30.3% had children under the age of 18 living with them, 37.2% were married couples living together, 20.4% had a female householder with no husband present, and 36.9% were non-families. 34.6% of all households were made up of individuals, and 16.0% had someone living alone who was 65 years of age or older. The average household size was 2.38 and the average family size was 3.04.

In the town, the population was spread out, with 21.6% under the age of 18, 11.1% from 18 to 24, 35.0% from 25 to 44, 16.9% from 45 to 64, and 15.4% who were 65 years of age or older. The median age was 36.7 years. Male population makes up 37% with a median age of 34.1 years. The female population makes up 63% with a median age of 37.7 years.

The median income for a household in the town was $22,933, and the median income for a family was $33,984. Males had a median income of $29,500 versus $19,861 for females. The per capita income for the town was $11,420. About 20.9% of families and 24.8% of the population were below the poverty line, including 32.8% of those under age 18 and 26.1% of those age 65 or over. Of the 1,115 occupied housing units, 46.7% are owner-occupied housing units while 53.3% are renter-occupied housing units.

== Education ==
- Montgomery Community College
- Montgomery County Central High School
- Montgomery Learning Academy
- Page Street Elementary

== In popular culture ==
A short story by Charles W. Chesnutt, "The Sheriff's Children", is set in Troy.

== Notable people ==
- Henry F. Warner, United States Army soldier and recipient of the Medal of Honor for his actions in World War II
