= Montgomery County, North Carolina =

County in North Carolina, United States

- County
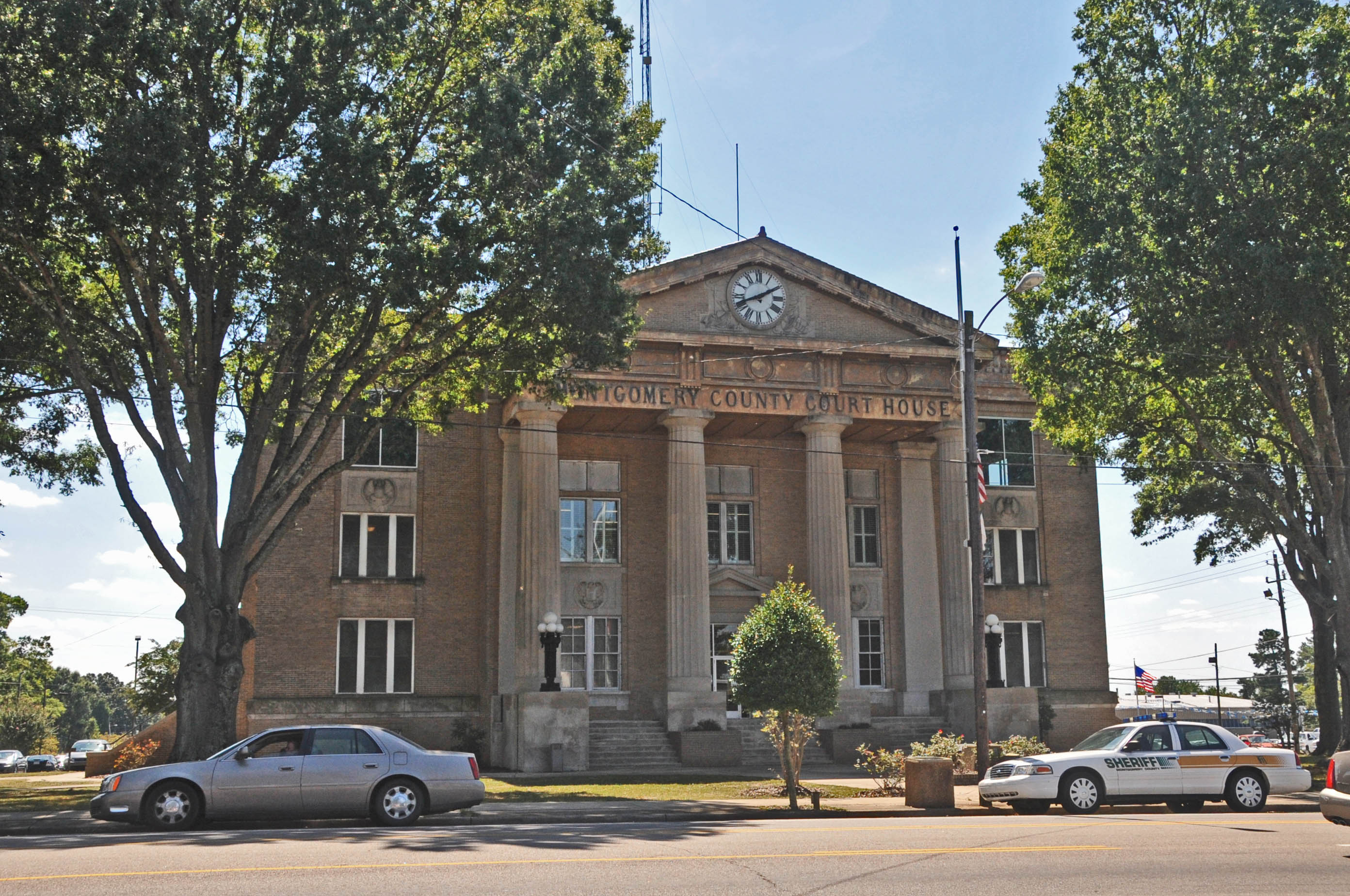
- Montgomery County Courthouse

- Seal Logo
- Motto: "The Golden Opportunity"
- Location within the U.S. state of North Carolina
- Coordinates: 35.33°N 79.91°W
- Country: United States
- State: North Carolina
- Founded: 1779
- Named for: Richard Montgomery
- Seat: Troy
- Largest community: Troy

Area
  - Total: 501.54 sq mi (1,299.0 km^{2})
  - Land: 491.54 sq mi (1,273.1 km^{2})
  - Water: 10.00 sq mi (25.9 km^{2}) 1.99%

Population (2020)
  - Total: 25,751
  - Estimate (2025): 26,403 ▲
  - Density: 52.68/sq mi (20.34/km^{2})
- Time zone: UTC−5 (Eastern)
  - Summer (DST): UTC−4 (EDT)
- Congressional district: 8th
- Website: www.montgomerycountync.gov

Montgomery County is a rural county located in the southern Piedmont of the U.S. state of North Carolina. As of the 2020 census, the population was 25,751. Its county seat is Troy.

== History ==
The first inhabitants of the area eventually comprising Montgomery County were Keyauwee and Cheraw Native Americans. The first European settlers were German and Scottish.

Montgomery County was created in 1779 out of Anson County. It was named in honor of Richard Montgomery, an American Revolutionary War general killed in 1775 while attempting to capture Quebec City, Canada. The law establishing the county also directed a group of commissioners to secure land near the center of the county for the construction of a country courthouse and prison. Many residents were dissatisfied with the location chosen, and after several years of demurring on a decision, a courthouse was erected in the community of Henderson, created at the confluence of the Yadkin and Uwharrie rivers in 1794. In 1816, the old courthouse was sold another was erected at the new community of Laurenceville. In 1841, the portion of Montgomery County west of the Yadkin/Pee Dee River became Stanly County. Two years later, commissioners were selected to move the courthouse to Montgomery's geographic center, and in 1844 Troy was established as the county seat.

The county's first paved roads were established in the 1920s. The Great Depression, which began in 1929, had a large adverse impact on the local agricultural and manufacturing industries. By 1933, 30 percent of local residents were unemployed.

== Geography ==
Interactive map of Montgomery County

According to the U.S. Census Bureau, the county has a total area of 501.54 square miles (1,299.0 km^{2}), of which 491.54 square miles (1,273.1 km^{2}) is land and 10.00 square miles (25.9 km^{2}) (1.99%) is water. Montgomery is bordered by Davidson, Moore, Richmond, Randolph, and Stanly counties. Most of the county lies within the Yadkin-Pee Dee River Basin, with some smaller areas lying within the Cape Fear and Lumber River basins. The Uwharrie National Forest encompasses a large swathe of the county.

=== State and local protected areas/sites ===
- Pee Dee River Game Land (part)
- Roy J. Maness Nature Preserve
- Town Creek Indian Mound State Historic Site
- Uwharrie Game Land (part)
- Yadkin River Game Land (part)

=== Major water bodies ===
- Badin Lake
- Big Creek
- Big Mountain Creek
- Densons Creek
- Drowning Creek
- Great Pee Dee River
- Jackson Creek
- Lake Tillery
- Little River
- Rocky Creek
- Spencer Creek
- Tuckertown Reservoir
- Uwharrie River
- Yadkin River

== Demographics ==
Historical population
Census	Pop.	Note	%±
1790	5,039		—
1800	7,677		52.4%
1810	8,430		9.8%
1820	8,693		3.1%
1830	10,919		25.6%
1840	10,780		−1.3%
1850	6,872		−36.3%
1860	7,649		11.3%
1870	7,487		−2.1%
1880	9,374		25.2%
1890	11,239		19.9%
1900	14,197		26.3%
1910	14,967		5.4%
1920	14,607		−2.4%
1930	16,218		11.0%
1940	16,280		0.4%
1950	17,260		6.0%
1960	18,408		6.7%
1970	19,267		4.7%
1980	22,469		16.6%
1990	23,346		3.9%
2000	26,822		14.9%
2010	27,798		3.6%
2020	25,751		−7.4%
2025 (est.)	26,403	▲	2.5%
U.S. Decennial Census; 1790–1960 1900–1990; 1990–2000 2010 2020

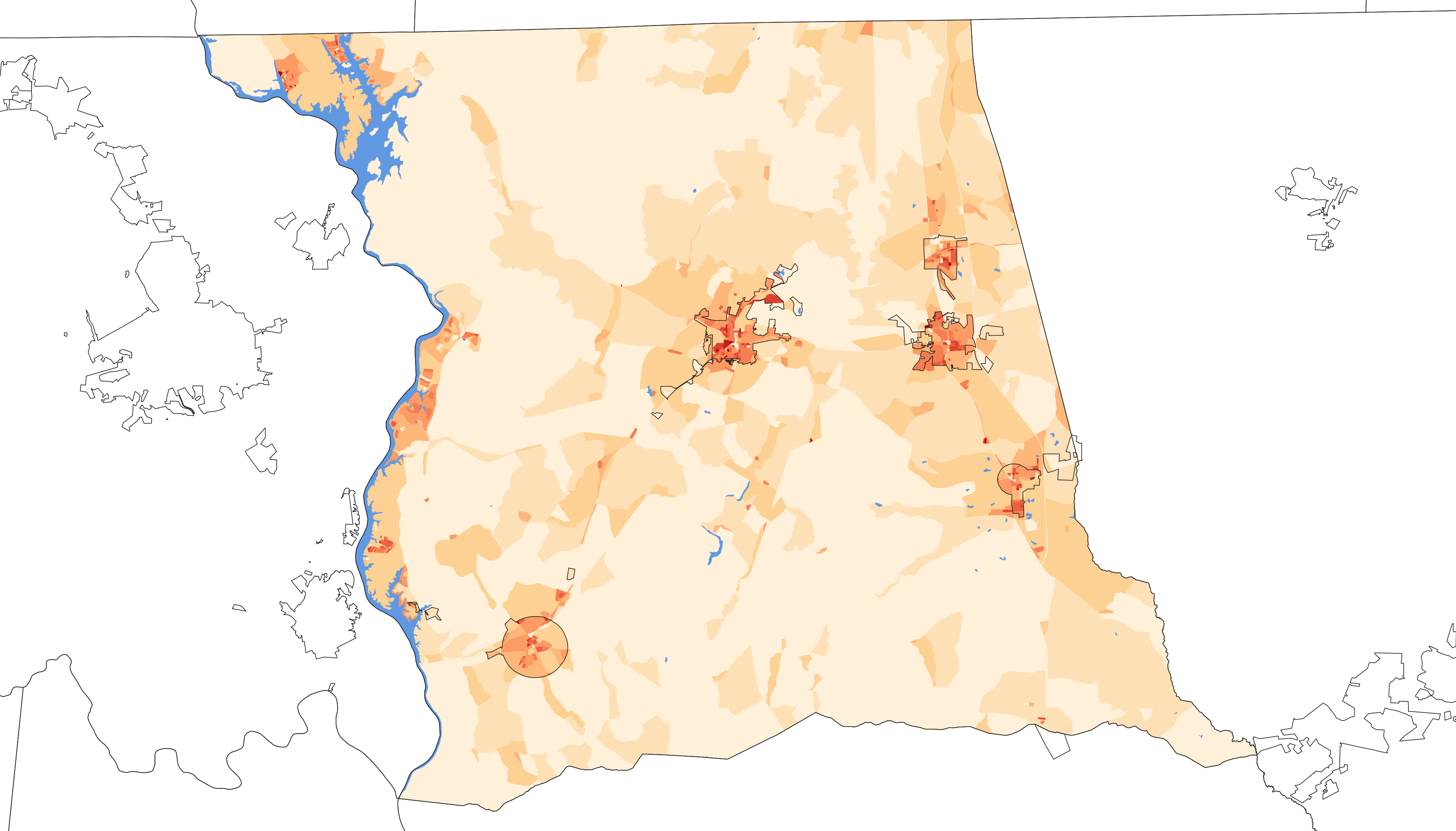
2020 population density of Montgomery County NC by census block

=== Racial and ethnic composition ===
Montgomery County, North Carolina – Racial and ethnic composition Note: the US Census treats Hispanic/Latino as an ethnic category. This table excludes Latinos from the racial categories and assigns them to a separate category. Hispanics/Latinos may be of any race.
Race / Ethnicity (NH = Non-Hispanic)	Pop 1980	Pop 1990	Pop 2000	Pop 2010	Pop 2020	% 1980	% 1990	% 2000	% 2010	% 2020
White alone (NH)	16,755	16,564	17,514	17,875	16,504	74.57%	70.95%	65.30%	64.30%	64.09%
Black or African American alone (NH)	5,440	5,986	5,805	5,182	4,192	24.21%	25.64%	21.64%	18.64%	16.28%
Native American or Alaska Native alone (NH)	64	90	76	102	76	0.28%	0.39%	0.28%	0.37%	0.30%
Asian alone (NH)	10	142	412	439	391	0.04%	0.61%	1.54%	1.58%	1.52%
Native Hawaiian or Pacific Islander alone (NH)	x	x	4	3	2	x	x	0.01%	0.01%	0.01%
Other race alone (NH)	4	8	12	16	47	0.02%	0.03%	0.04%	0.06%	0.18%
Mixed race or Multiracial (NH)	x	x	202	255	615	x	x	0.75%	0.92%	2.39%
Hispanic or Latino (any race)	196	556	2,797	3,926	3,924	0.87%	2.38%	10.43%	14.12%	15.24%
Total	22,469	23,346	26,822	27,798	25,751	100.00%	100.00%	100.00%	100.00%	100.00%

=== 2020 census ===
As of the 2020 census, there were 25,751 people, 10,333 households, and 6,788 families residing in the county.

The median age was 44.8 years, with 21.6% of residents under the age of 18 and 21.4% aged 65 or older; for every 100 females there were 100.0 males, and there were 98.7 males for every 100 females age 18 and over.

The racial makeup of the county was 65.7% White, 16.4% Black or African American, 0.5% American Indian and Alaska Native, 1.5% Asian, <0.1% Native Hawaiian and Pacific Islander, 10.7% from some other race, and 5.1% from two or more races. Hispanic or Latino residents of any race comprised 15.2% of the population.

<0.1% of residents lived in urban areas, while 100.0% lived in rural areas.

There were 10,333 households in the county, of which 27.7% had children under the age of 18 living in them. Of all households, 47.1% were married-couple households, 19.9% were households with a male householder and no spouse or partner present, and 27.4% were households with a female householder and no spouse or partner present. About 29.0% of all households were made up of individuals and 14.3% had someone living alone who was 65 years of age or older.

There were 14,773 housing units, of which 30.1% were vacant. Among occupied housing units, 74.0% were owner-occupied and 26.0% were renter-occupied. The homeowner vacancy rate was 2.0% and the rental vacancy rate was 5.0%.

=== 2000 census ===
At the 2000 census, there were 26,822 people, 9,848 households, and 7,189 families residing in the county. The population density was 55 people per square mile (21 people/km^{2}). There were 14,145 housing units at an average density of 29 per square mile (11/km^{2}). The racial makeup of the county was 69.07% White, 21.84% Black or African American, 0.40% Native American, 1.61% Asian, 0.04% Pacific Islander, 5.75% from other races, and 1.29% from two or more races. 10.43% of the population were Hispanic or Latino of any race.

There were 9,848 households, out of which 31.00% had children under the age of 18 living with them, 55.60% were married couples living together, 12.40% had a female householder with no husband present, and 27.00% were non-families. 24.10% of all households were made up of individuals, and 10.70% had someone living alone who was 65 years of age or older. The average household size was 2.61 and the average family size was 3.080.

In the county, the population was spread out, with 24.90% under the age of 18, 9.00% from 18 to 24, 28.50% from 25 to 44, 23.60% from 45 to 64, and 14.00% who were 65 years of age or older. The median age was 37 years. For every 100 females there were 102.60 males. For every 100 females age 18 and over, there were 100.60 males.

The median income for a household in the county was $32,903, and the median income for a family was $39,616. Males had a median income of $27,832 versus $21,063 for females. The per capita income for the county was $16,505. About 10.90% of families and 15.40% of the population were below the poverty line, including 19.50% of those under age 18 and 17.80% of those age 65 or over.

== Law and government ==
=== Government ===
The county's government is led by a board of commissioners, is responsible for levying taxes and appropriating county funds, issuing ordinances to regulate resident behavior, and overseeing county government administration. A county manager oversees most regular administrative activities and is responsible for executing the board's wishes.

Montgomery County is a member of the Piedmont Triad Council of Governments, a regional voluntary association of 12 counties, It is located entirely in the North Carolina Senate's 29th district, the North Carolina House of Representatives' 67th district, and North Carolina's 8th congressional district. It is represented in the 118th United States Congress by Mark Harris(R).

=== Politics ===
United States presidential election results for Montgomery County, North Carolina
Year	Republican		Democratic		Third party(ies)	
Year	No.	%	No.	%	No.	%
1912	144	7.19%	1,012	50.55%	846	42.26%
1916	1,196	49.46%	1,222	50.54%	0	0.00%
1920	2,304	49.82%	2,321	50.18%	0	0.00%
1924	2,077	45.50%	2,483	54.39%	5	0.11%
1928	2,653	56.82%	2,016	43.18%	0	0.00%
1932	2,153	42.23%	2,927	57.41%	18	0.35%
1936	2,506	41.84%	3,484	58.16%	0	0.00%
1940	1,789	37.30%	3,007	62.70%	0	0.00%
1944	1,963	42.42%	2,665	57.58%	0	0.00%
1948	1,975	43.33%	2,165	47.50%	418	9.17%
1952	3,181	50.04%	3,176	49.96%	0	0.00%
1956	3,359	52.10%	3,088	47.90%	0	0.00%
1960	3,649	52.53%	3,297	47.47%	0	0.00%
1964	3,385	46.26%	3,933	53.74%	0	0.00%
1968	3,070	39.67%	2,410	31.14%	2,259	29.19%
1972	4,417	65.67%	2,175	32.34%	134	1.99%
1976	2,872	39.83%	4,308	59.74%	31	0.43%
1980	3,587	45.74%	4,129	52.65%	126	1.61%
1984	5,109	57.07%	3,831	42.79%	12	0.13%
1988	4,504	52.80%	3,995	46.83%	31	0.36%
1992	3,543	38.67%	4,422	48.27%	1,196	13.06%
1996	3,379	43.11%	3,856	49.20%	603	7.69%
2000	4,946	55.11%	3,979	44.34%	49	0.55%
2004	5,745	56.99%	4,313	42.79%	22	0.22%
2008	6,155	54.91%	4,926	43.94%	129	1.15%
2012	6,404	57.02%	4,706	41.90%	121	1.08%
2016	7,130	61.79%	4,150	35.96%	260	2.25%
2020	8,411	65.46%	4,327	33.68%	111	0.86%
2024	9,044	68.48%	4,055	30.71%	107	0.81%

As of March 2022, 35.9 percent of registered voters in Montgomery County were Republicans, 34.1 percent were registered Democrats, and 29.4 percent were registered unaffiliated.

== Economy ==
One of the United States' largest lumber mills, a Jordan Lumber & Supply facility, is located near Mt. Gilead.

== Transportation ==
Interstate 73/Interstate 74 runs through the eastern portion of Montgomery County. The main east-to-west road route which crosses the county is North Carolina Highway 27. Freight rail service is run by the Aberdeen, Carolina and Western Railway, which operates an east-to-west line through the county which connects to Charlotte and Raleigh, and another which runs south to the Southern Pines/Pinehurst region. Corporate and private airplane facilities are provided by the Montgomery County Airport, located in the eastern portion of the county.

=== Major highways ===
- US 220
- US 220 Alt.
- NC 24
- NC 24 Bus. (business route)
- NC 27 Bus.
- NC 73
- NC 109
- NC 109 Bus. (Mount Gilead)
- NC 109 Bus. (Troy)
- NC 134
- NC 211
- NC 731

== Education ==
The public school system provides five elementary schools (Star, Mt. Gilead, Candor, Page Street, and Green Ridge), two middle schools (West Montgomery and East Montgomery and one high school (Montgomery Central, formed in 2020 by the merger of East Montgomery High and West Montgomery High). Higher education is provided by Montgomery Community College.

== Communities ==
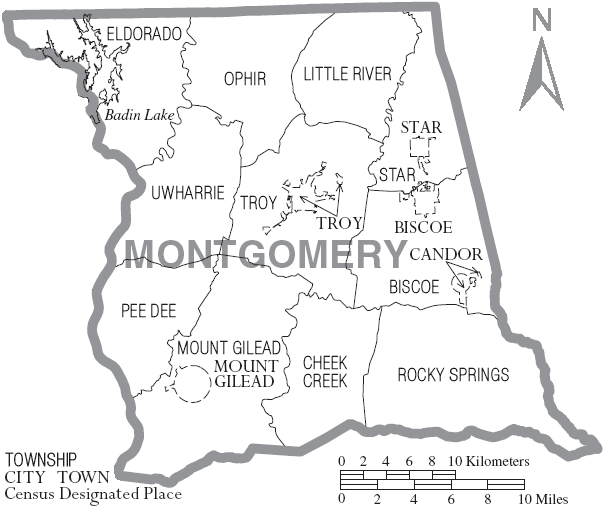
Map of Montgomery County with municipal and township labels

=== Towns ===
- Biscoe
- Candor (also in Moore County)
- Mount Gilead
- Star
- Troy (county seat and largest community)

=== Townships ===
- Biscoe
- Cheek Creek
- Eldorado
- Little River
- Mount Gilead
- Ophir
- Pee Dee
- Rocky Springs
- Star
- Troy
- Uwharrie

=== Unincorporated communities ===
- Abner
- Black Ankle
- Blaine
- Chip
- Dry Creek
- Eldorado
- Emery
- Ether
- Harrisville
- Love Joy
- Okeewemee
- Ophir
- Pee Dee
- Pekin
- Steeds
- Thickety Creek
- Uwharrie
- Wadeville
- Wind Blow (also in Richmond County)

== Notable people ==
- Beulah Parson Davis (1896–1948), fortune-telling witch
- Henry F. Warner (1923–1944), United States Army World War II Medal of Honor recipient

• Dusty Blake- MLB Pitching Coach

== See also ==
- List of counties in North Carolina
- National Register of Historic Places listings in Montgomery County, North Carolina

== Works cited ==
- Corbitt, David Leroy (2000). The formation of the North Carolina counties, 1663-1943 (reprint ed.). Raleigh: North Carolina Division of Archives and History. OCLC 46398241.
- Rosen, Richard A.; Mosnier, Joseph (2016). Julius Chambers: A Life in the Legal Struggle for Civil Rights. Chapel Hill: The University of North Carolina Press. ISBN 9781469628554.
