= National Register of Historic Places listings in Richmond County, North Carolina =

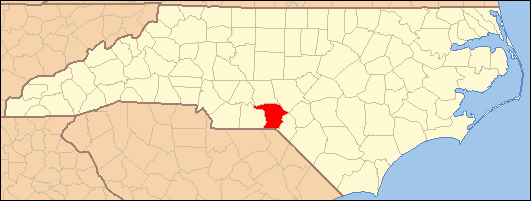

This list includes properties and districts listed on the National Register of Historic Places in Richmond County, North Carolina. Click the "Map of all coordinates" link to the right to view a Google map of all properties and districts with latitude and longitude coordinates in the table below.

== Current listings ==
This National Park Service list is complete through NPS recent listings posted March 14, 2025.

| | Name on the Register | Image | Date listed | Location | City or town | Description |
|---|---|---|---|---|---|---|
| 1 | Bank of Pee Dee Building | Bank of Pee Dee Building | September 22, 1983 (#83001905) | 201 E. Washington St. 34°56′22″N 79°46′25″W | Rockingham | |
| 2 | Bostick School | Bostick School | April 20, 2005 (#05000327) | 604 Clayton Carriker Rd. 35°07′34″N 79°46′22″W | Ellerbe | |
| 3 | Covington Plantation House | Covington Plantation House | May 28, 1980 (#80002897) | Southwest of Rockingham; 34°53′49″N 79°48′12″W | Rockingham | |
| 4 | Alfred Dockery House | Alfred Dockery House | November 20, 1986 (#86003350) | E side SR 1005, 0.1 mile S of jct. with SR 1143; 35°00′38″N 79°48′48″W | Rockingham | |
| 5 | Ellerbe Springs Hotel | Ellerbe Springs Hotel | June 4, 1980 (#80002896) | N of Ellerbe; 35°05′30″N 79°45′48″W | Ellerbe | |
| 6 | Hannah Pickett Mill No. 1 | | September 22, 1983 (#83001906) | 300 King Edward St. 34°55′02″N 79°45′40″W | Rockingham | |
| 7 | Liberty Hill School | Liberty Hill School | January 17, 2008 (#07001409) | 234 Covington Comm. Rd. 35°08′15″N 79°52′00″W | Ellerbe | |
| 8 | John Phillips Little House | John Phillips Little House | December 20, 1984 (#84000590) | Off NC 73; 35°09′11″N 79°55′12″W | Little's Mill | |
| 9 | Main Street Commercial Historic District | Main Street Commercial Historic District | March 19, 1992 (#92000169) | 2-105 Main St. 34°53′03″N 79°41′59″W | Hamlet | |
| 10 | Manufacturers Building | Manufacturers Building | May 29, 1979 (#79003348) | 220 E. Washington St. 34°56′21″N 79°46′22″W | Rockingham | |
| 11 | Mount Carmel Presbyterian Church and Cemetery | | December 19, 2019 (#100004795) | 1367 Clayton Carriker Rd. 35°10′25″N 79°45′23″W | Norman | Extends into Montgomery County |
| 12 | Powell-Brookshire-Parker Farm | | January 16, 2008 (#07001410) | 1881 E. NC 73; 35°08′07″N 79°53′17″W | Ellerbe | |
| 13 | Richmond County Courthouse | Richmond County Courthouse | May 10, 1979 (#79001747) | Franklin St. between Hancock and Lee Sts. 34°56′15″N 79°46′26″W | Rockingham | |
| 14 | Roberdel Mill No. 1 Company Store | Roberdel Mill No. 1 Company Store | September 22, 1983 (#83001907) | 1106 Roberdel Rd. 34°58′18″N 79°44′40″W | Roberdel | |
| 15 | Rockingham Historic District | Rockingham Historic District | November 21, 1983 (#83003981) | Roughly bounded by LeGrand and Brookwood Aves., Leak and Ann Sts. 34°56′29″N 79°45′47″W | Rockingham | |
| 16 | Seaboard Air Line Passenger Depot | Seaboard Air Line Passenger Depot | November 19, 1971 (#71000617) | 2 Main St. 34°53′01″N 79°41′58″W | Hamlet | Continues in use as an Amtrak station. |
| 17 | U. S. Post Office and Federal Building | U. S. Post Office and Federal Building | September 22, 1983 (#83001908) | 125 S. Hancock St. 34°56′18″N 79°46′24″W | Rockingham | |
| 18 | H. C. Watson House | H. C. Watson House | September 22, 1983 (#83001909) | 526 Caroline St. 34°55′50″N 79°46′39″W | Rockingham | |

== Former listing ==
| | Name on the Register | Image | Date listed | Date removed | Location | City or town | Description |
|---|---|---|---|---|---|---|---|
| 1 | Great Falls Mill | Great Falls Mill | December 13, 1971 (#71001069) | September 2, 1975 | W. Washington and Broad Aves. 34°56′17″N 79°46′55″W | Rockingham | Destroyed by fire on October 8, 1972. Facade still standing. |

== See also ==
- National Register of Historic Places listings in North Carolina
- List of National Historic Landmarks in North Carolina
