= R. W. Goodman =

American law enforcement officer (1915–2007)

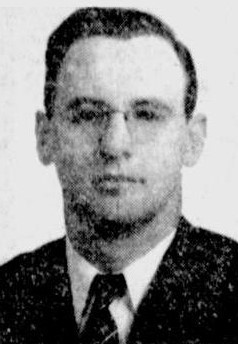
- Goodman c. 1946

18th Sheriff of Richmond County, North Carolina
- In office 1950–1994
- Preceded by: Carl Holland

Personal details
- Born: August 23, 1915 Richmond County, North Carolina, US
- Died: April 5, 2007 (aged 91) Rockingham, North Carolina, US
- Party: Democratic Party

Raymond Wallace Goodman (August 23, 1915 – April 5, 2007) was an American law enforcement officer and businessman who served as Sheriff of Richmond County, North Carolina from 1950 until 1994, making him the longest serving sheriff in North Carolina history. Born in the county to a textile worker, he dropped out high school to work in a mill and as a deliveryman before undertaking brief service with the United States Navy. Upon returning to Richmond County, Goodman began working at a store in Rockingham, which he eventually bought out and renamed R. W. Goodman Company. He expanded his holdings over the following years, growing his store and acquiring a textile mill.

Goodman ran for the office of Sheriff of Richmond County in 1946, but lost the contest. He ran again four years later and was elected. While serving as sheriff, he rarely stayed in his official office, and management of the sheriff's department was usually performed by his chief deputy, who reported to him several times a day, though he would go to investigate large crime scenes and perform high-profile arrests. Goodman instead spent most of his time in his store, from where he acted as the boss of a conservative Democratic courthouse machine. Politically influential, he was often sought by local candidates for endorsements and used his connections to lobby the state government in Raleigh. Unlike other politicians in the American South during his tenure, Goodman courted black support, hiring a few black sheriff's deputies and supporting some black candidates for local offices in the 1970s. He retired in 1994 and died in 2007.

== Early life ==
R. W. Goodman was born on August 23, 1915, in Richmond County, North Carolina, United States to Maggie Wallace Goodman and John Lawrence Goodman. R. W. lived in a rented textile mill company house with 15 siblings. His father worked in the company's mill in Cordova and as a barber. After his father died, R. W. dropped out of high school and took up work in the mill and making deliveries for a dry-cleaner. Goodman then briefly served in the United States Navy before being discharged in 1937. The following year he married Alice Smith, a woman who lived in the same mill village. He had four children with her.

== Career ==
In 1938 Goodman began working at the E. B. Morse Store in Rockingham, across the street from the Richmond County Courthouse. He bought a portion of the building in 1941, and then purchased the rest of it three years later, renaming it R. W. Goodman Company. Under Goodman, the store acted as a full service retailer and mostly sold clothing and furniture. He bought nearby buildings over the following years for use as offices and showrooms. Over time he gained enough wealth to move his family into a prominent Rockingham neighborhood. In 1967 he joined with several partners in establishing Richmond Yarns, a textile mill near Ellerbe. He became the sole owner in 1975. It employed over 200 people.

He would put out the word of who he was for and that was it. It was not only Richmond County. It took in all the counties surrounding it.

— Former North Carolina Attorney General Rufus L. Edmisten on Goodman's influence in local elections

Goodman supported DeWitt Ornsby's election as the sheriff of Richmond County, but Ornsby died in a car accident during his first month in office. The county commission appointed Carl Holland to fill the vacancy, who Goodman disliked. Aware of this, Holland, dared Goodman to challenge him. In 1946 Goodman launched his own candidacy for the office of sheriff. He lost the May 25 Democratic primary election, earning 2,281 votes to the Holland's 2,931 votes. He ran against Holland four years later with the electoral support of local mill workers and prevailed, becoming the 18th sheriff of Richmond County.

As sheriff, Goodman was the boss of a conservative Democratic courthouse machine in Richmond County, though he objected to such characterization. He held wide influence in determining who served in local government and represented the county in the North Carolina General Assembly and maintained a wide network of informants. He oversaw the machine from his furniture store, where he spent most of his time. He did not carry a gun and rarely stayed in his official office. Management of the sheriff's department was usually performed by his chief deputy, who reported to him several times a day, though he would go to investigate large crime scenes and perform high-profile arrests. Sheriff's deputies would stop by his store to update him on law enforcement matters, as would local constituents who wanted his help or wished to discuss politics with him. If he saw a politician or journalist walking by with whom he wished to speak, he would send a store clerk out to fetch them. Beginning in the 1960s, local politicians would stop by his store in election years to ask for his endorsement. Goodman used his connections with local representatives to lobby the state government in Raleigh; in one instance he successfully secured state funding for a new water system on behalf of Hamlet municipal officials.

Goodman allegedly garnered electoral support by being lenient with minor offenders with the implicit expectation that they voted for him and his preferred candidates in a subsequent election. He would also help his supporters find county government jobs or lend them credit through his store. Unlike other politicians in the American South during his tenure, Goodman courted black support and hired a few black sheriff's deputies. Most local black citizens considered him "fair and impartial" when dealing with matters related to race. Beginning in the 1970s, he supported some black candidates for public office. This included his endorsement of Maceo McEachern in 1972, the first black man elected to the Richmond County Board of Education since Reconstruction. McEachern later became a county commissioner and fell out with Goodman, who supported his electoral defeat in 1982. In June 1975 racial tensions in Hamlet dramatically worsened after a white Hamlet police sergeant got involved in an altercation with a black woman and allegedly shot her in the back. She filed a complaint concerning the sergeant's actions but local judicial officials refused to indict the officer, leading to a night of arson and rioting. The situation calmed after Goodman secured an arrest warrant against the sergeant for assault with a deadly weapon, and personally arrested him.

While serving as sheriff Goodman became wealthy, and some locals attributed this to allegations that he collected kickbacks from real estate transactions he managed and other financial dealings. Some locals also accused him of illegally selling moonshine the sheriff's department had seized. He was officially investigated by other law enforcement agencies in 1957 for this supposed practice but was absolved of any misconduct. Goodman was also staunchly opposed to labor unions and allegedly harassed union organizers and pressured rival corporations with the goal of keeping wages depressed in Richmond County so as to guarantee larger profits from his own enterprises.

Goodman took courses in county law enforcement at the Institute of Government at the University of North Carolina at Chapel Hill in 1951. He served as a delegate at the 1960 Democratic National Convention. He served as a member of the North Carolina Economic Development Board from 1977 to 1984. In 1978 he accompanied North Carolina Governor Jim Hunt to Germany to recruit foreign industrial investment. He retired from the office of sheriff in 1994 after serving in the post for 44 years, setting the record for the longest tenure of a sheriff in North Carolina.

== Later life and legacy ==
In 1983 the westbound lane of the U.S. Route 74 bridge over the Pee Dee River was renamed in Goodman's honor. Goodman suffered from two heart attacks in his life in 1989 and underwent open-heart surgery late in his tenure as sheriff. In 1989 the Richmond County Chamber of Commerce awarded him its "Citizen of the Year" honor. In 1994 the North Carolina Senate passed a resolution honoring Goodman for his long tenure as Sheriff of Richmond County. In 2005 the Richmond County Democratic Party initiated an annual fundraising dinner partly named in homage to him.

Goodman's wife died in 2001. Goodman died on April 5, 2007, at his home in Rockingham and was buried two days later. Journalist Rob Christensen wrote that Goodman was "the last of the 'high sheriffs'" of North Carolina while The Charlotte Observer called him "the last of the old-style sheriffs." His son, Ken, later served in the North Carolina House of Representatives. Ken also managed the R. W. Goodman Company store until it closed in 2013.

== Works cited ==
- Christensen, Rob (2010). The Paradox of Tar Heel Politics : The Personalities, Elections, and Events That Shaped Modern North Carolina (second ed.). Chapel Hill: The University of North Carolina Press. ISBN 978-0-8078-7151-5.
- Cox, Clark (2003). Deadly Greed: The McEachern Murders in Hamlet, North Carolina. Boone: High Country Publishers. ISBN 9781932158496.
- Sherman, Daniel J. (2012). Not Here, Not There, Not Anywhere: Politics, Social Movements, and the Disposal of Low-Level Radioactive Waste. Routledge. ISBN 9781136522062.
- Simon, Bryant (2020). The Hamlet Fire: A Tragic Story of Cheap Food, Cheap Government, and Cheap Lives. Chapel Hill: The University of North Carolina Press. ISBN 9781469661377.
