= North Carolina Highway 177 =

State highway in Richmond County, North Carolina, US

North Carolina Highway 177

Route information
- Maintained by NCDOT
- Length: 16.1 mi (25.9 km)
- Existed: 1961–present

Major junctions
- South end: SC 177 at the South Carolina state line near Hamlet
- I-74 / US 74 near Hamlet; US 74 Bus. in Hamlet
- North end: US 1 near Hoffman

Location
- Country: United States
- State: North Carolina
- Counties: Richmond

Highway system
- North Carolina Highway System; Interstate; US; State; Scenic
← US 176	→ US 178

North Carolina Highway 177 (NC 177) is a 16-mile-long (26 km) route in the Piedmont region of North Carolina. The road runs from South Carolina Highway 177 (SC 177) at the North Carolina-South Carolina border, through the town of Hamlet to U.S. Highway 1 (US 1) just south of Hoffman and just north of Rockingham. NC 177 was created in 1961 as a renumbering of NC 77.

== Route description ==
SC 177 becomes NC 177 at the North Carolina–South Carolina border south of Hamlet. The road runs through an area with many farms and forest until reaching US 74/Interstate 74 south of Hamlet. The road enters Hamlet along Cheraw Road and runs through the downtown area. The road exits Hamlet passing near Dobbins Heights and a large railroad yard. NC 177 then follows King Street to its end at US 1 next to the Rockingham Speedway.

== History ==
NC 177 was created in 1961 as a renumbering of NC 77, around the same time Interstate 77 was being constructed in the state. The road has stayed the same since its beginning.

=== North Carolina Highway 77 ===
North Carolina Highway 77
- Location: SC State Line–Hoffman, NC
- Existed: 1934–1961

=== North Carolina Highway 204 ===
North Carolina Highway 204
- Location: SC State Line–Hoffman, NC
- Existed: 1921–1934

== Junction list ==
The entire highway is in Richmond County.

Location	mi	km	Destinations	Notes
	0.0	0.0	SC 177 south – Cheraw	South Carolina state line
Hamlet	4.0	6.4	I-74 / US 74 – Laurinburg, Rockingham	Exit 316 (US 74)
Hamlet	7.5	12.1	US 74 Bus. (Hamlet Avenue) – Rockingham	
Marston	16.1	25.9	US 1 – Rockingham, Aberdeen	
1.000 mi = 1.609 km; 1.000 km = 0.621 mi
