= South Carolina Highway 98 =

South Carolina Highway 98 may refer to:

- South Carolina Highway 98 (1928–1938), a former state highway northeast of Cheraw
- South Carolina Highway 98 (1940–1956), a former state highway from Robat to near Pacolet
