= Fruitland, Richmond County, North Carolina =

Fruitland, North Carolina
- Unincorporated community
- Location within North Carolina Location within the United States
- Coordinates: 34°55′29″N 79°39′01″W
- Country: United States
- State: North Carolina
- County: Richmond
- Elevation: 420 ft (130 m)
- Time zone: UTC-5 (Eastern (EST))
  - Summer (DST): UTC-4 (EDT)
- Area codes: 910, 472
- GNIS feature ID: 1020372

Fruitland is an unincorporated community in Richmond County, North Carolina, United States. Fruitland is located along North Carolina Highway 177, 3.7 miles (6.0 km) northeast of Hamlet.
