= East Rockingham =

East Rockingham may refer to:

- East Rockingham, North Carolina, U.S.
- East Rockingham, Western Australia
- East Rockingham High School, Elkton, Virginia, U.S.
