= Manufacturers Building =

Manufacturers Building may refer to:

- Manufacturers Building (Rockingham, North Carolina)
- Manufacturers Building at the Alaska Yukon Pacific Exposition in Seattle, 1909
- Manufacturers Building, a historic building in Pioneer Square (Seattle, Washington)
