= John Phillips Little House =

Historic house in North Carolina, United States

- U.S. National Register of Historic Places
- Location within North Carolina Location within the United States
- Nearest city: Off NC 73, near Little's Mills, North Carolina
- Coordinates: 35°09′11″N 79°55′12″W
- Area: 54 acres (22 ha)
- Built: c. 1850–1855
- Architectural style: Greek Revival
- NRHP reference No.: 84000590
- Added to NRHP: December 20, 1984

John Phillips Little House is a historic plantation house located near Little's Mills, Richmond County, North Carolina. It was built between 1850 and 1855, and is a two-story, three-bay, frame dwelling in the Greek Revival style. It features a low hip roof and one-story porch supported by four fluted Doric order columns. Also on the property are the contributing blacksmith's shop, the ruins of the cook's house, the site of the original kitchen, two small dove-tail plank structures, a 20th-century shed structure, and a large plank barn.

It was listed on the National Register of Historic Places in 1984.
