= Rockingham Historic District =

Historic district in North Carolina, United States

- U.S. National Register of Historic Places
- U.S. Historic district
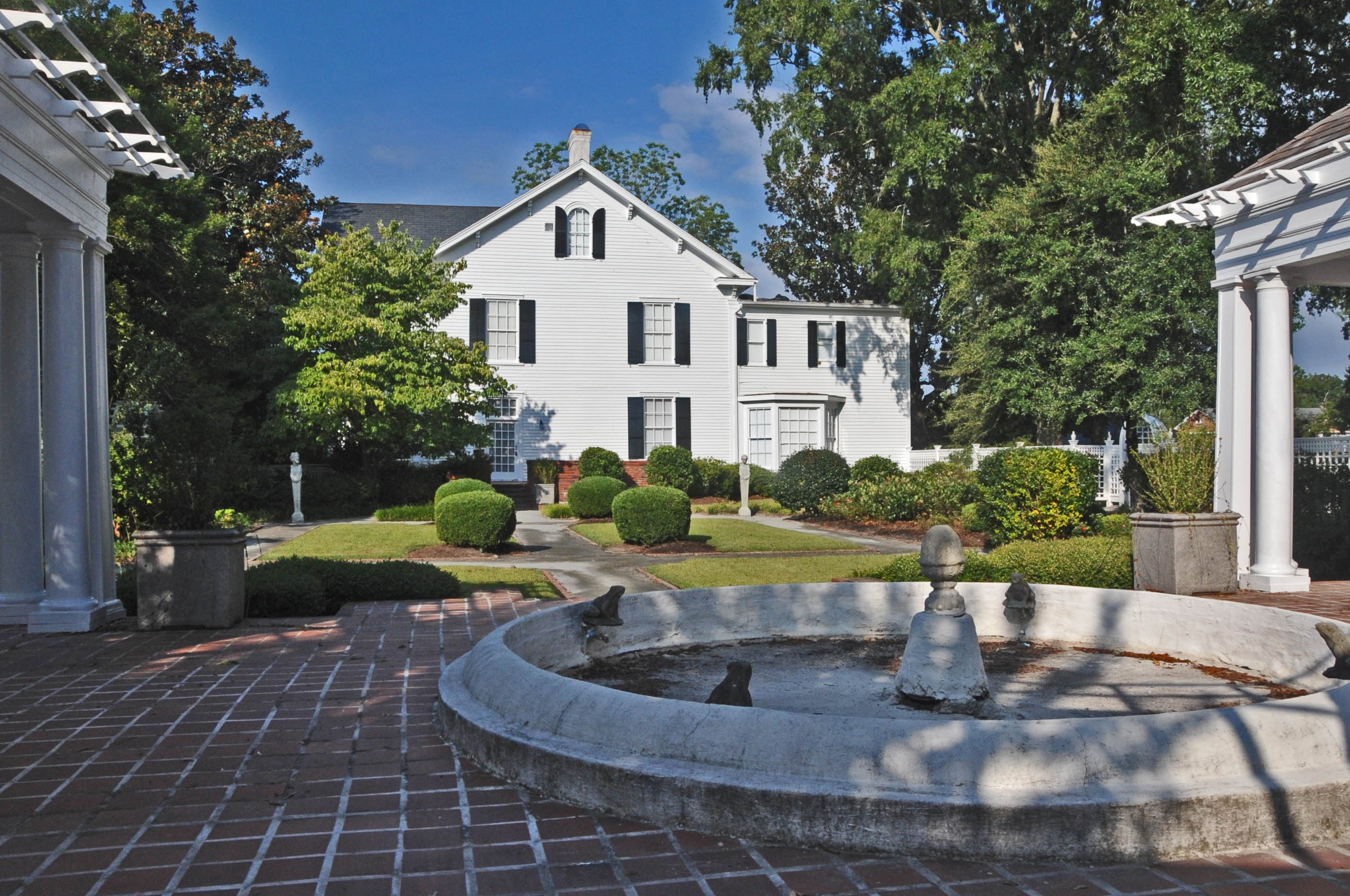
- Leak Wall House (1853), Rockingham Historic District, March 2007

- Location within North Carolina Location within the United States
- Location: Roughly bounded by LeGrand and Brookwood Aves., Leak and Ann Sts., Rockingham, North Carolina
- Coordinates: 34°56′29″N 79°45′47″W
- Area: 165 acres (67 ha)
- Architect: Multiple, including Joseph W. Royer
- Architectural style: Late 19th And 20th Century Revivals, Mixed (more Than 2 Styles From Different Periods), Bungalow
- MPS: Rockingham MRA
- NRHP reference No.: 83003981
- Added to NRHP: November 21, 1983

Rockingham Historic District is a national historic district located at Rockingham, Richmond County, North Carolina. The district encompasses 181 contributing buildings and 1 contributing site in a predominantly residential section of Rockingham. It includes buildings built between the early-19th century through the early 20th century in a variety of popular architectural styles. Notable buildings include the Steele-Johnson-Cole House (1838), Leak-Wall House (1853), W. C. Leak House (1890s), Ledbetter-Leath House, the W. B. Cole House, Dr. Robert S. Cole House, and Mial Leak House.

The Jay Helms House, 603 E. Washington Street, (c. 1946), a ranch style house, was designed by architect Joseph W. Royer.

The district was added to the National Register of Historic Places in 1983.
