= United States Post Office and Federal Building (Rockingham, North Carolina) =

Historic building in North Carolina, US

- U. S. Post Office and Federal Building
- U.S. National Register of Historic Places
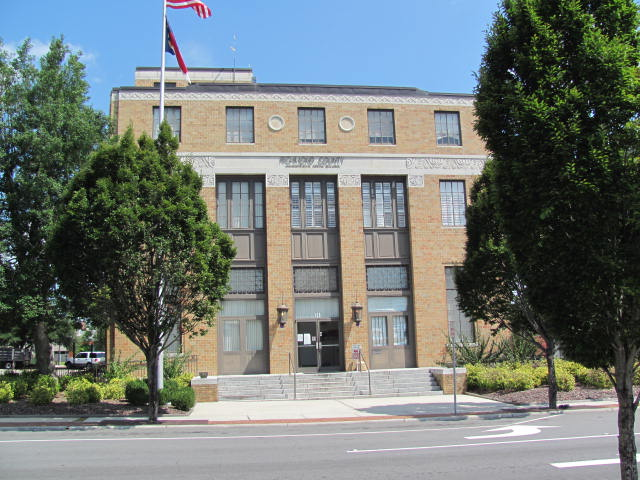
- U. S. Post Office and Federal Building, September 2014

- Location within North Carolina Location within the United States
- Location: 125 S. Hancock St., Rockingham, North Carolina
- Coordinates: 34°56′10″N 79°46′23″W
- Area: less than one acre
- Built: 1935-1936
- Built by: Blaire, A. Farnell
- Architect: Simon, Louis A.
- Architectural style: Art Deco
- MPS: Rockingham MRA
- NRHP reference No.: 83001908
- Added to NRHP: September 22, 1983

U. S. Post Office and Federal Building is a historic post office building located at Rockingham, Richmond County, North Carolina. It was designed by the Office of the Supervising Architect under Louis A. Simon and built in 1935–1936. It is a two-story, five-bay, yellow brick veneer building in the Art Deco style. It features a 1937 Works Progress Administration mural titled "Human Aspects of the Postal Service" ·by artist Edward Lanning in the front lobby. The building was occupied by the Rockingham Post Office until 1977 when it was purchased by Richmond County from the United States Postal Service.

It was listed on the National Register of Historic Places in 1983.
