= Hannah Pickett Mill No. 1 =

- U.S. National Register of Historic Places
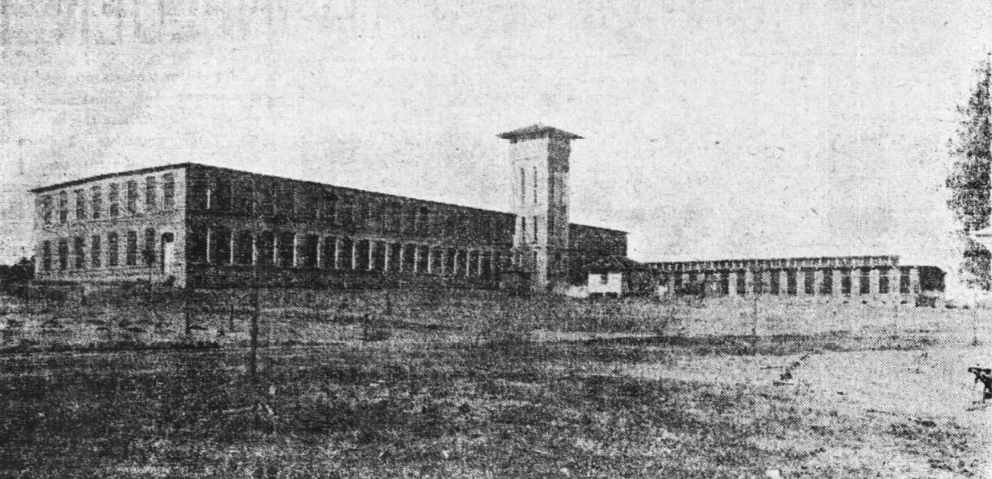
- Hannah Pickett Mill in 1917

- Location within North Carolina Location within the United States
- Location: 300 King Edward St., Rockingham, North Carolina
- Coordinates: 34°55′2″N 79°45′40″W
- Area: 2.3 acres (0.93 ha)
- Built: 1906-1908, 1920s
- Architectural style: Italianate
- MPS: Rockingham MRA
- NRHP reference No.: 83001906
- Added to NRHP: September 22, 1983

Hannah Pickett Mill No. 1 was a historic textile mill complex located at Rockingham, Richmond County, North Carolina. The complex consisted of a large two-story main building with Italianate style tower built between 1906 and 1908, and two large, attached weave rooms, two adjacent cotton warehouses, and a small brick veneered office building dating from the early 1920s. The Hannah Pickett Mill administrative offices were housed in the Manufacturers Building. It has been demolished.

It was listed on the National Register of Historic Places in 1983.
