= Roberdel Mill No. 1 Company Store =

Historic building in North Carolina, US

- U.S. National Register of Historic Places
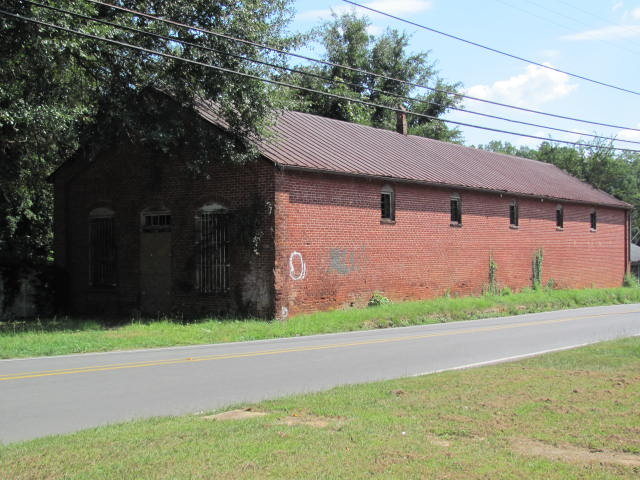
- Roberdell Mill 1 Company Store, September 2014

- Location within North Carolina Location within the United States
- Location: 1106 Roberdel Rd., Roberdel, North Carolina
- Coordinates: 34°58′18″N 79°44′40″W
- Area: less than one acre
- Built: c. 1885
- MPS: Rockingham MRA
- NRHP reference No.: 83001907
- Added to NRHP: September 22, 1983

Roberdel Mill No. 1 Company Store is a historic company store located at Roberdel, Richmond County, North Carolina, north of Rockingham. It was built about 1885, and is a one-story, three-bay, brick building with a gable roof. The Roberdel Mill administrative offices were housed in the Manufacturers Building.

It was listed on the National Register of Historic Places in 1983.
