= Ellerbe Springs Hotel =

- U.S. National Register of Historic Places
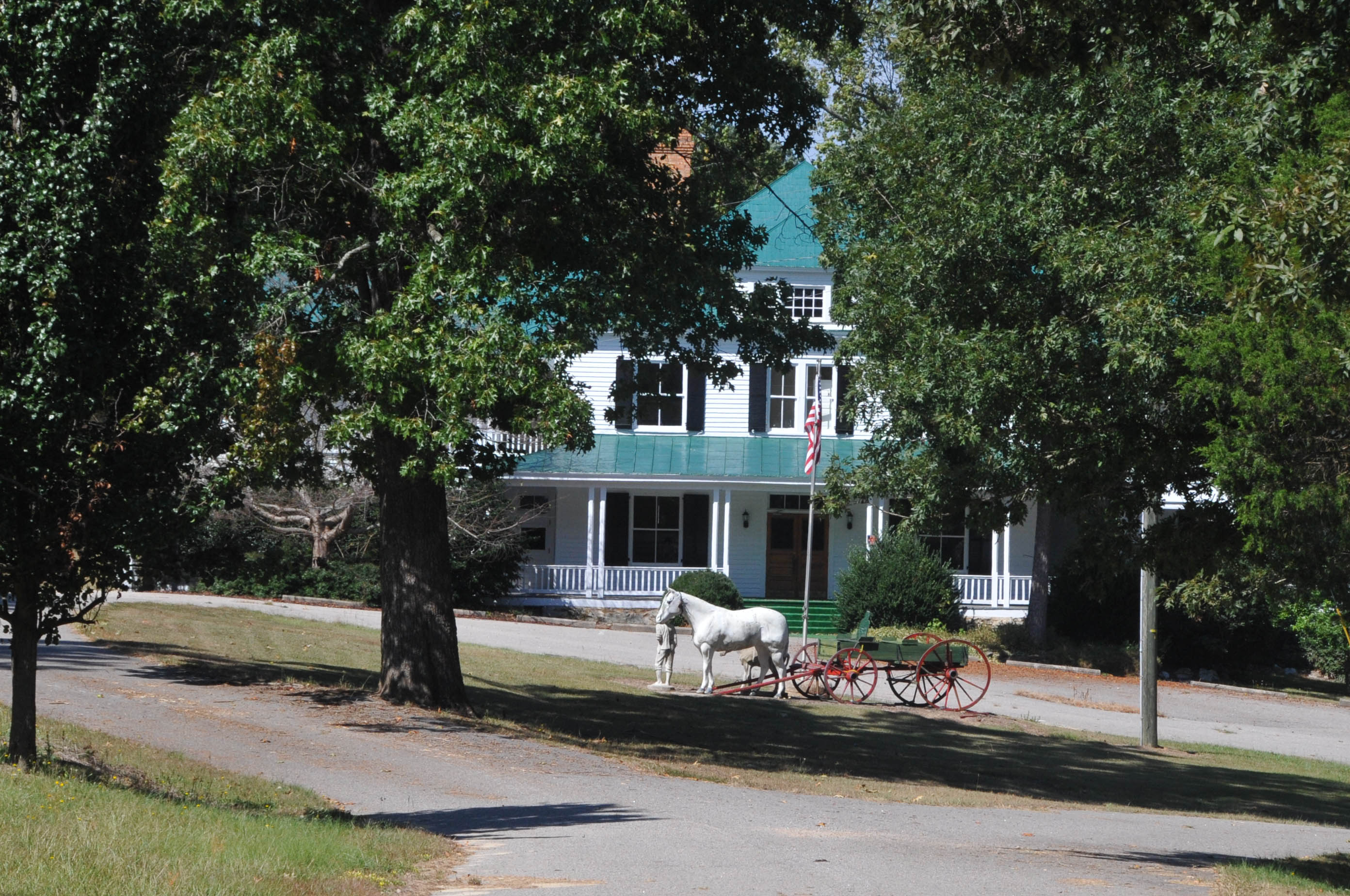

- Location within North Carolina Location within the United States
- Location: N of Ellerbe, near Ellerbe, North Carolina
- Coordinates: 35°05′30″N 79°45′48″W
- Area: 48.2 acres (19.5 ha)
- Built: c. 1875; 151 years ago
- Architectural style: Late Victorian
- NRHP reference No.: 80002896
- Added to NRHP: June 4, 1980

Ellerbe Springs Hotel is a historic rural resort hotel located near Ellerbe, Richmond County, North Carolina. It was built around 1875 and is a two-story, three part, rambling frame dwelling in the Late Victorian style. It consists of a five bay central block with five bay flanking wings and steep hipped roofs. It features a one-story, wraparound porch. Also on the property is a contributing late-19th century dance pavilion. The hotel developed around a mineral spring. Eleanor Roosevelt was a visitor to the site in 1940, when she spoke of the president's National Youth Administration program.

It was listed on the National Register of Historic Places in 1980.
