= Bostick School =

Historic school building in North Carolina, United States

- U.S. National Register of Historic Places
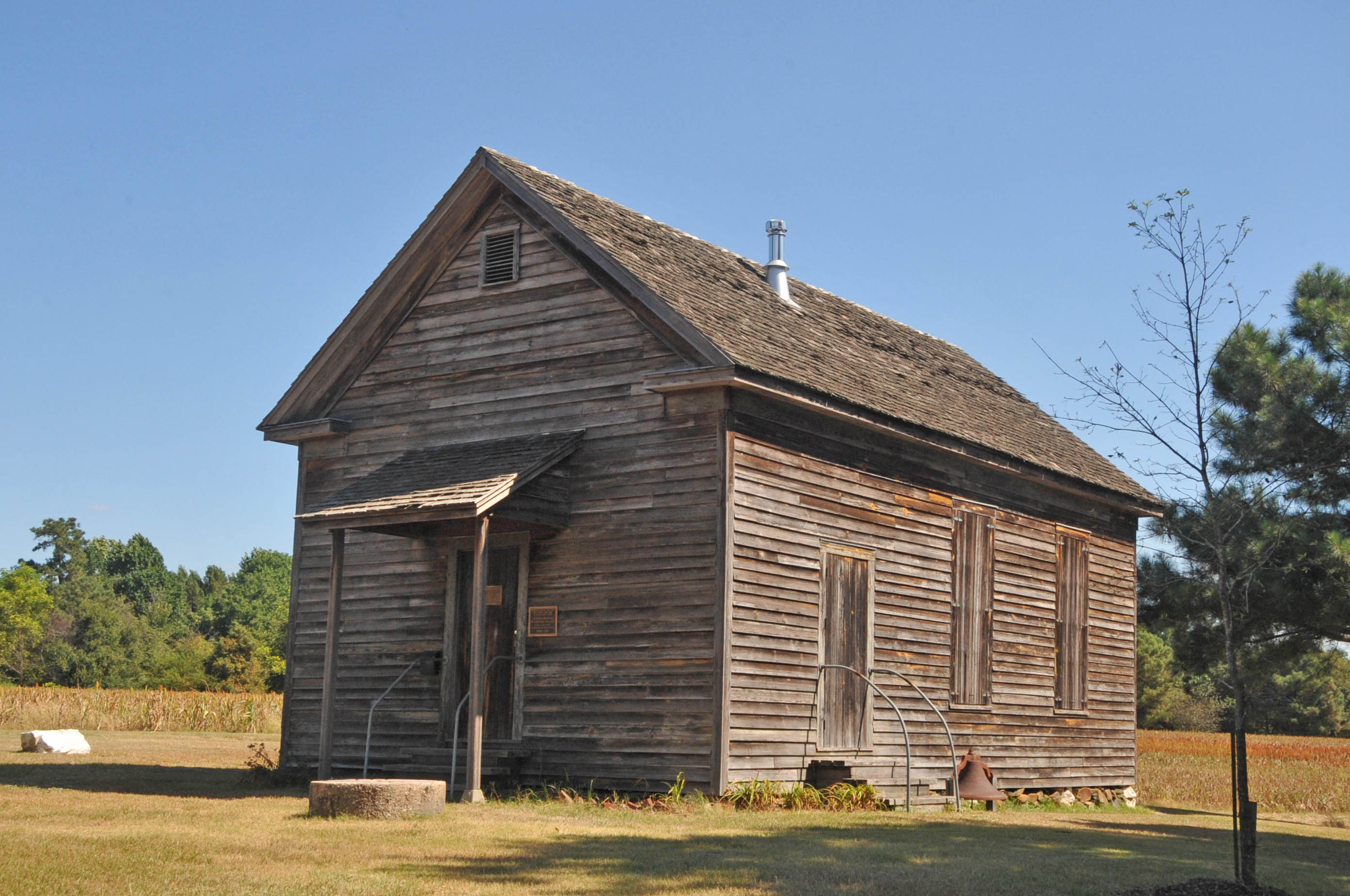
- Bostick School, March 2007

- Location within North Carolina Location within the United States
- Location: 604 Clayton Carriker Rd., near Ellerbe, North Carolina
- Coordinates: 35°7′34″N 79°46′22″W
- Area: less than one acre
- Built: c. 1890
- NRHP reference No.: 05000327
- Added to NRHP: April 20, 2005

Bostick School is a historic one-room school located near Ellerbe, Richmond County, North Carolina. It was built about 1890, and is a one-story, gable-front frame building clad in weatherboard siding. It measures approximately 26 feet by 36 feet. The structure ceased to operate as a school in 1922, and subsequently used as a peach packhouse, a tobacco barn, and a tool shed. The school building underwent a major restoration between the years 1992 and 1998.

It was listed on the National Register of Historic Places in 2005.
