= Covington Plantation House =

Historic house in North Carolina, United States

- U.S. National Register of Historic Places
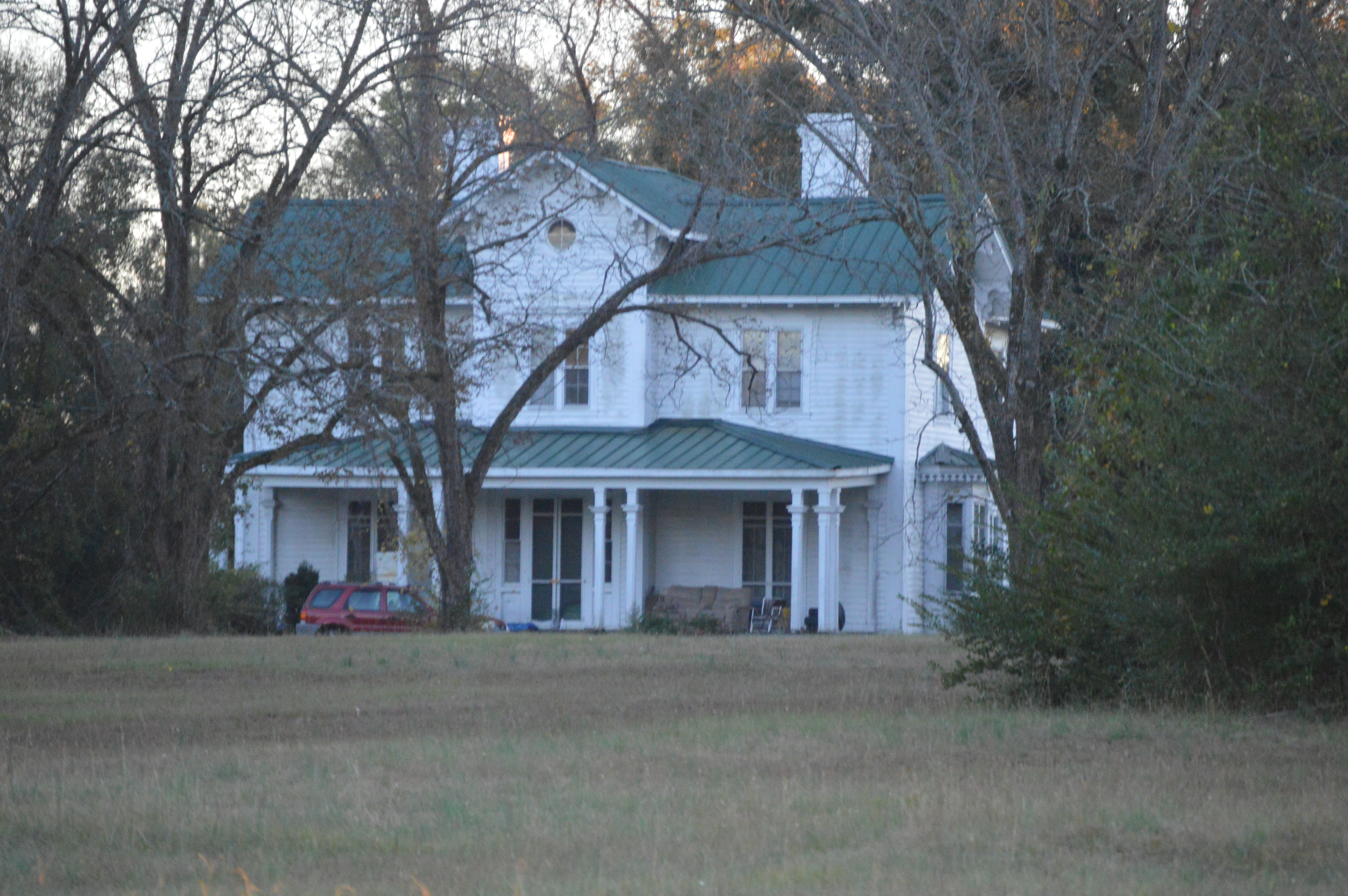
- Roadside view from U.S. Route 1

- Location within North Carolina Location within the United States
- Location: SW of Rockingham, North Carolina
- Coordinates: 34°53′49″N 79°48′13″W
- Area: 14.4 acres (5.8 ha)
- Built: c. 1850
- Architectural style: Italianate
- NRHP reference No.: 80002897
- Added to NRHP: May 28, 1980

Covington Plantation House, also known as John Wall Covington House, is a historic plantation house located near Rockingham, Richmond County, North Carolina. It was built about 1850, and is a two-story, three-bay, frame dwelling in the Italianate style. It features a low-pitched bracketed gable roofs, wide eaves, and a 2 1/2-story central projection.

It was listed on the National Register of Historic Places in 1980.
