= Liberty Hill School (Ellerbe, North Carolina) =

Historic school building in North Carolina, United States

- U.S. National Register of Historic Places
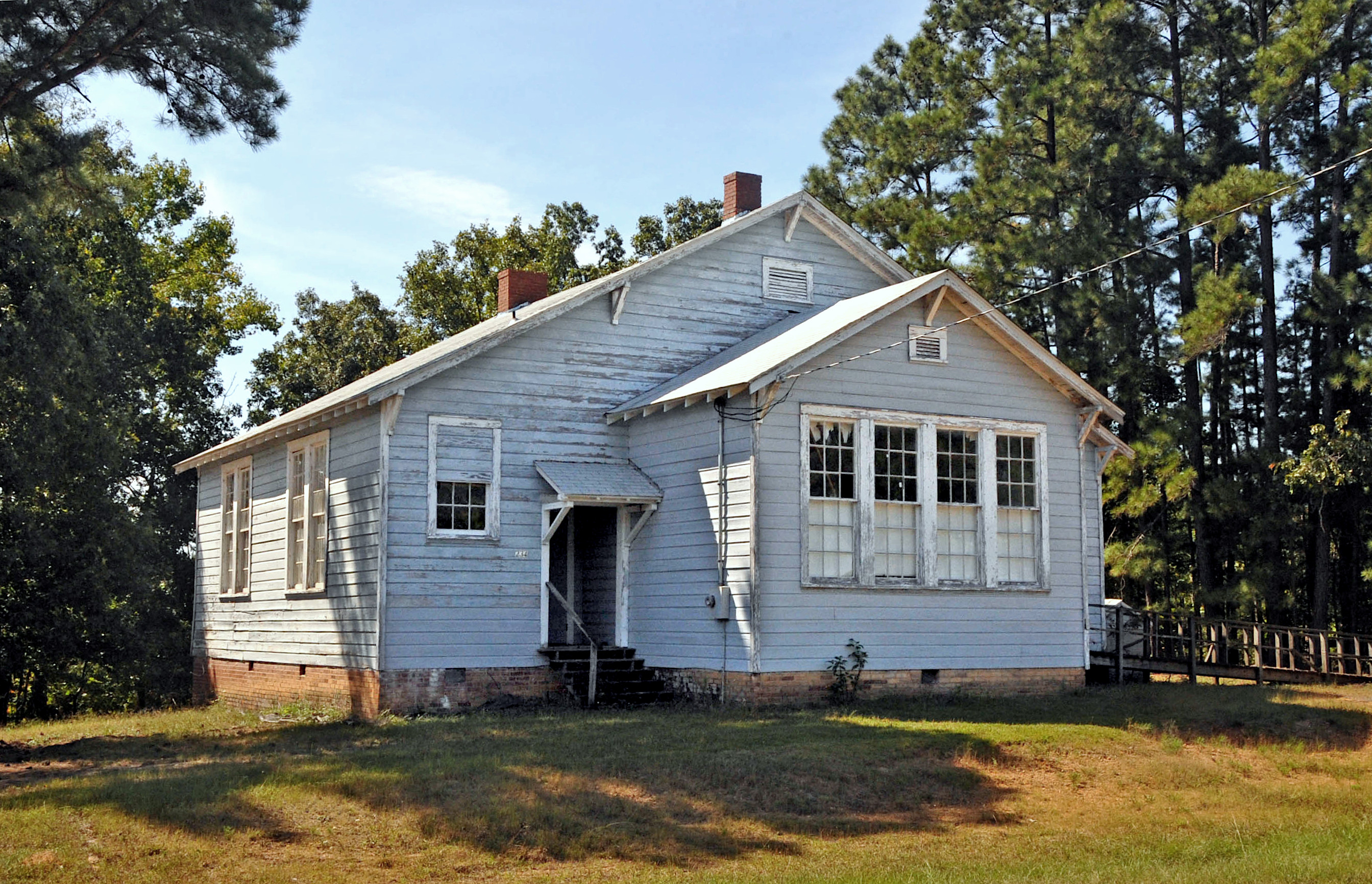
- Liberty Hill School, March 2007

- Location within North Carolina Location within the United States
- Location: 234 Covington Comm. Rd., near Ellerbe, North Carolina
- Coordinates: 35°8′15″N 79°52′0″W
- Area: 1 acre (0.40 ha)
- Built: 1930
- Architectural style: Bungalow/craftsman
- NRHP reference No.: 07001409
- Added to NRHP: January 17, 2008

Liberty Hill School, also known as the Liberty-Exway School and Covington Community Center, is a historic Rosenwald School for African-American students located near Ellerbe, in Richmond County, North Carolina. Built in 1930, it is a one-story, two-teacher school with American Craftsman design elements. It measures approximately 44 by 36.5 feet (13.4 by 11.1 m). The structure ceased to operate as a school in the mid-1950s and subsequently used as a community center.

It was listed on the National Register of Historic Places in 2008.
