= H. C. Watson House =

Historic house in North Carolina, United States

- U.S. National Register of Historic Places
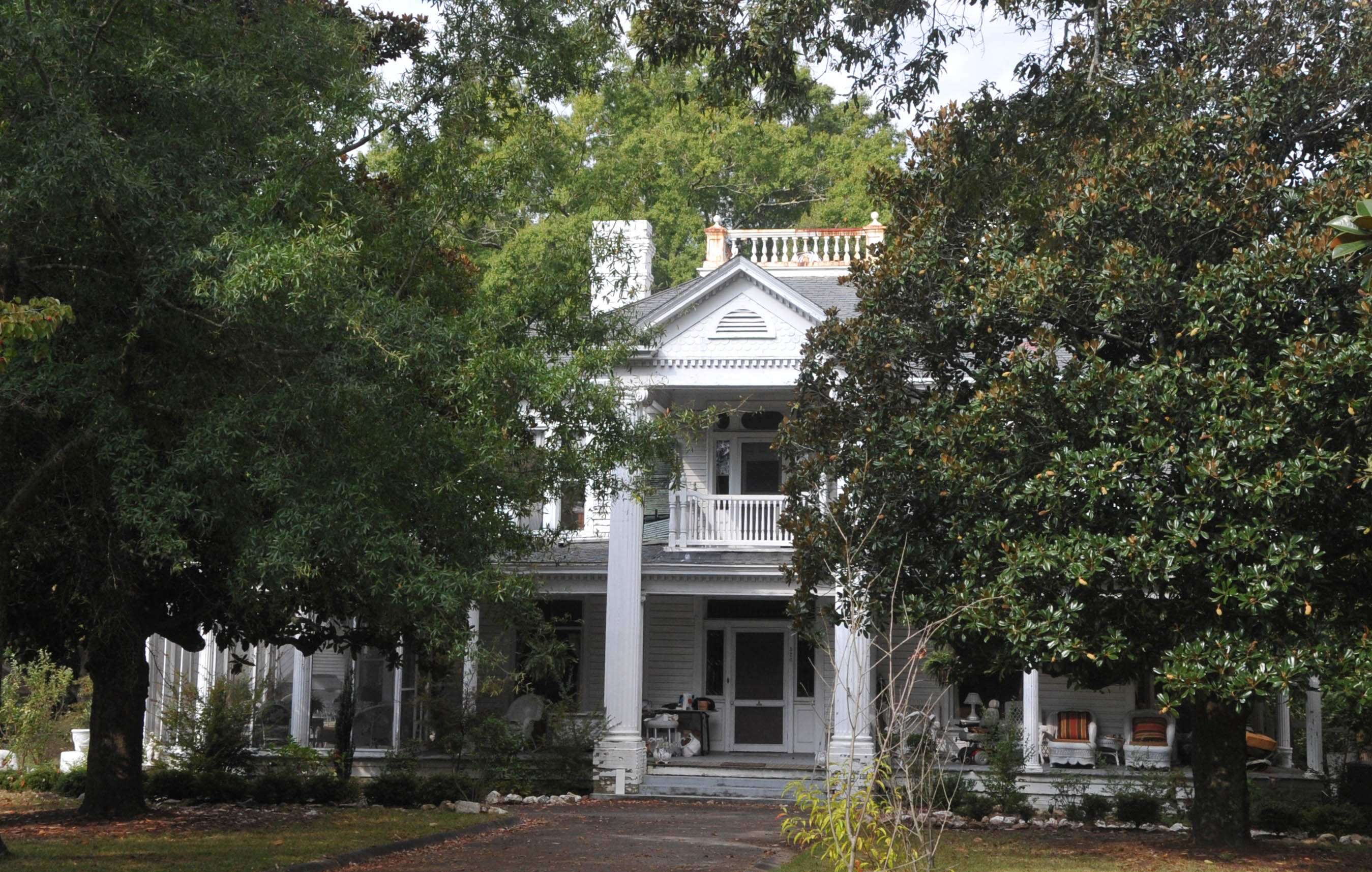
- H. C. Watson House, March 2007

- Location within North Carolina Location within the United States
- Location: 526 Caroline St., Rockingham, North Carolina
- Coordinates: 34°55′57″N 79°46′39″W
- Area: 5 acres (2.0 ha)
- Built: c. 1885, c. 1900
- Architectural style: Classical Revival
- MPS: Rockingham MRA
- NRHP reference No.: 83001909
- Added to NRHP: September 22, 1983

H. C. Watson House is a historic home located at Rockingham, Richmond County, North Carolina. It was built about 1885, and remodeled in the early-1900s in the Classical Revival style. It is a two-story, frame dwelling with a truncated slate hipped roof with a widow's walk and two story pedimented portico with fluted Ionic order columns. It features a formal wraparound porch and attached porte cochere. Also on the property are the contributing frame, gabled three-car garage, a small barn, and detached cookhouse.

It was listed on the National Register of Historic Places in 1983.
