= Bank of Pee Dee Building =

Historic bank building in North Carolina, US

- U.S. National Register of Historic Places
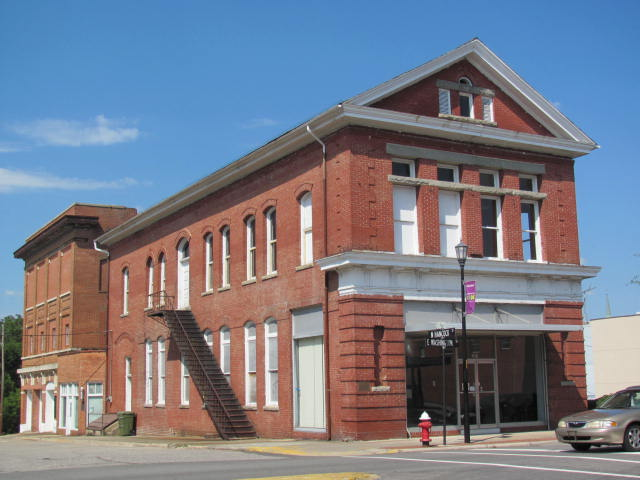
- Bank of Pee Dee Building, September 2014

- Location within North Carolina
- Location: 201 E. Washington St., Rockingham, North Carolina
- Coordinates: 34°56′24″N 79°46′25″W
- Area: less than one acre
- Built: 1905
- Architectural style: Early Commercial
- MPS: Rockingham MRA
- NRHP reference No.: 83001905
- Added to NRHP: September 22, 1983

Bank of Pee Dee Building (also known as Economy Auto Supply) is a historic bank building located at 201 East Washington Street in Rockingham, Richmond County, North Carolina. It was built in 1904–1905, and is a two-story, red brick early commercial style building. It has a pedimented front gable roof.

It was listed on the National Register of Historic Places in 1983.
