= Dobbins Heights, North Carolina =

- Town
- Dobbins Heights Town Hall

- Location within the state of North Carolina
- Coordinates: 34°54′25″N 79°41′36″W
- Country: United States
- State: North Carolina
- County: Richmond

Area
  - Total: 0.88 sq mi (2.29 km^{2})
  - Land: 0.88 sq mi (2.29 km^{2})
  - Water: 0 sq mi (0.00 km^{2})
- Elevation: 397 ft (121 m)

Population (2020)
  - Total: 687
  - Density: 778.2/sq mi (300.48/km^{2})
- Time zone: UTC-5 (Eastern (EST))
  - Summer (DST): UTC-4 (EDT)
- ZIP code: 28345
- Area codes: 910, 472
- FIPS code: 37-17325
- GNIS feature ID: 2406381
- Website: www.dobbinsheights.com

Dobbins Heights is a town in Richmond County, North Carolina, United States. As of the 2020 census, Dobbins Heights had a population of 687.

== Geography ==
According to the United States Census Bureau, the town has a total area of 0.9 square miles (2.3 km^{2}), all land.

== History ==
Dobbins Heights was originally known as North Yard. It began as a largely black community in an unincorporated part of Richmond County near the city of Hamlet, with fewer than 1,000 residents. A black school, the Pee Dee Institute, was built in North Yard in 1908. Through the 1960s, many of the homes in the community were rented, and existed in poor condition with outdoor plumbing. Many streets remained unpaved through the 1980s. Due to its unincorporated status, North Yard's residents received fewer government services than other municipal residents and lacked direct political representation. They usually paid taxes directly to Richmond County government, though occasionally levies were paid to Hamlet. There was little cohesive community identity in the area; collective social life, such as it existed, was centered around several churches.

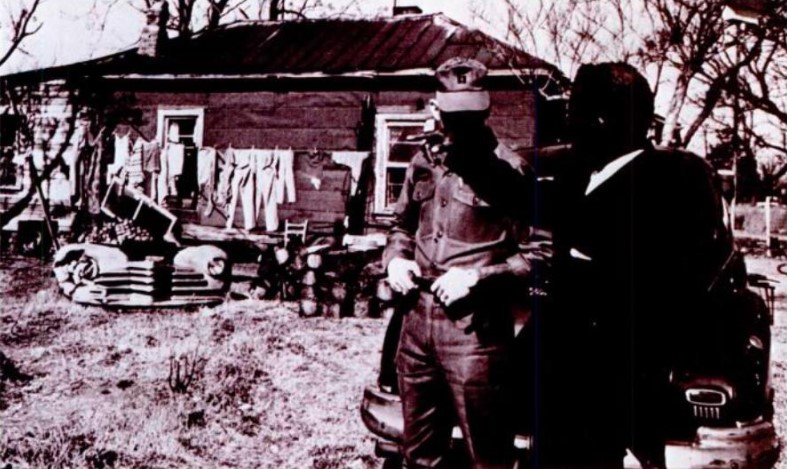
A home in Dobbins Heights, 1972

In the mid-1960s, a local minister founded the North Yard Improvement Association, which raised money to install streetlights along some of the main roads in the community. From 1971 to 1972 United States Army engineers built a recreational area in the community. Lack of adequate coverage from neighboring fire departments led the community to create a volunteer fire department in 1974. Two years later residents appealed for the city of Hamlet to annex the community, but the municipal government rejected the proposal, citing the economically depressed nature of the area. Some locals suspected their lack of success was due to racism. Following the failure of the annexation request, residents began pushing for North Yard to be incorporated in its own right, and began calling the community Dobbins Heights in homage to Jim Dobbins, a minister who had owned a significant amount of the area's land in the 1930s. In 1983 Representative Hugh Lee of Rockingham introduced a bill in the North Carolina General Assembly to authorize a local referendum to decide on incorporation. On May 8, 1984, the referendum was held which concluded narrowly in favor of incorporation, leading to the creation of the town of Dobbins Heights. A black mayor and all-black city council were elected, and the officials successfully secured state and federal grants to improve local infrastructure, including the rehabilitation of streets and parks and equipment acquisitions for the fire department.

== Demographics ==
Historical population
Census	Pop.	Note	%±
1990	1,144		—
2000	936		−18.2%
2010	866		−7.5%
2020	687		−20.7%
U.S. Decennial Census

=== 2020 census ===
Dobbins Heights racial composition
Race	Number	Percentage
White (non-Hispanic)	73	10.63%
Black or African American (non-Hispanic)	545	79.33%
Native American	6	0.87%
Asian	1	0.15%
Other/Mixed	45	6.55%
Hispanic or Latino	17	2.47%

As of the 2020 United States census, there were 687 people, 404 households, and 218 families residing in the town.

== Works cited ==
- Noland, Chuck (May 1972). "Home Front Action". Soldiers. Vol. 27. United States Department of the Army. pp. 23–26.
- Simmons-Henry, Linda, ed. (1990). The Heritage of Blacks in North Carolina. Vol. 1. North Carolina African-American Heritage Foundation. ISBN 9780912081120.
- Simon, Bryant (2020). The Hamlet Fire: A Tragic Story of Cheap Food, Cheap Government, and Cheap Lives. Chapel Hill: The University of North Carolina Press. ISBN 9781469661377.
