= Ellerbe, North Carolina =

- Town
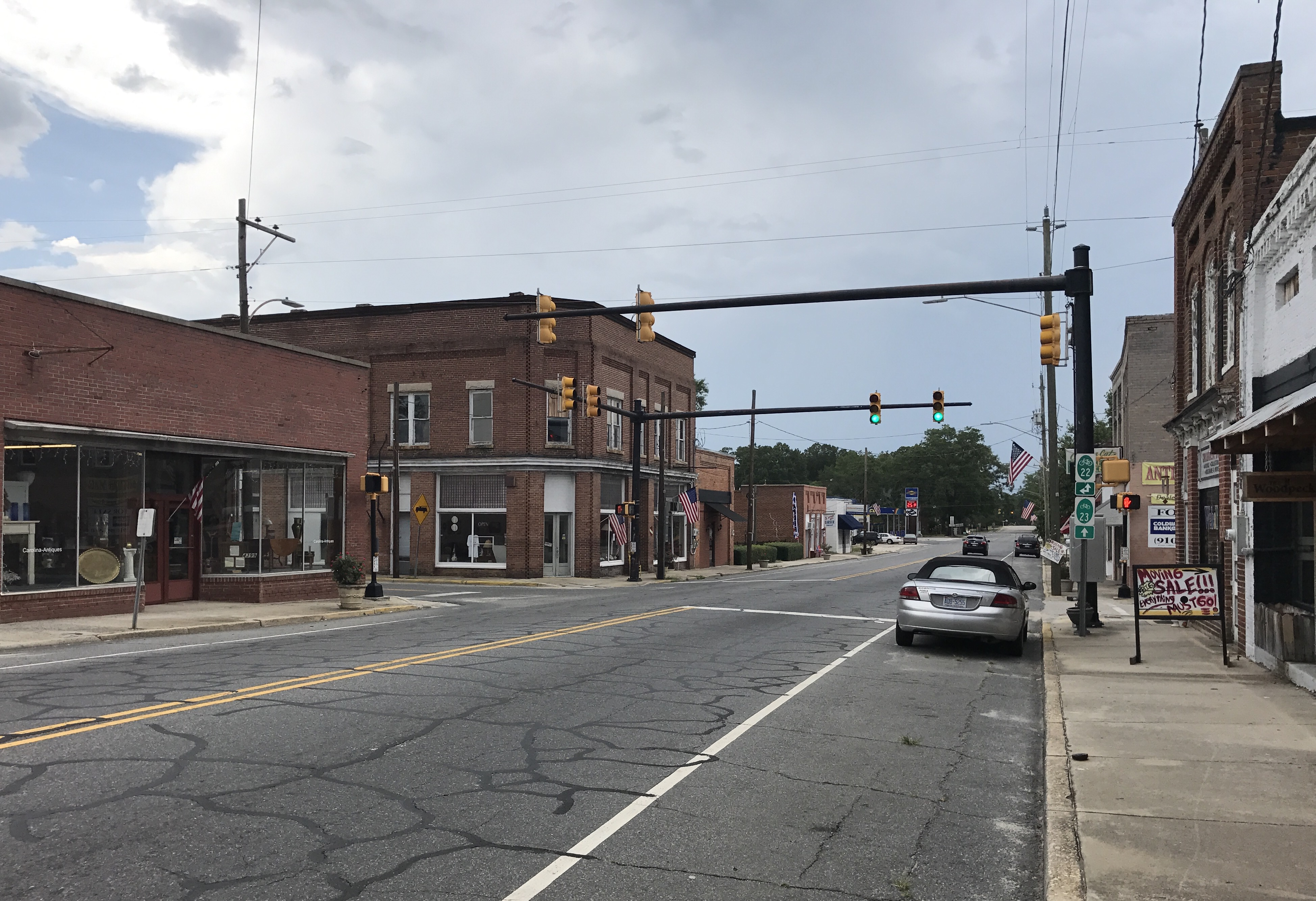

- Location within the state of North Carolina
- Coordinates: 35°04′19″N 79°45′35″W
- Country: United States
- State: North Carolina
- County: Richmond

Government
  - Mayor: Lee Berry

Area
  - Total: 1.32 sq mi (3.42 km^{2})
  - Land: 1.32 sq mi (3.41 km^{2})
  - Water: 0.0039 sq mi (0.01 km^{2})
- Elevation: 528 ft (161 m)

Population (2020)
  - Total: 864
  - Density: 657/sq mi (253.6/km^{2})
- Time zone: UTC-5 (Eastern (EST))
  - Summer (DST): UTC-4 (EDT)
- ZIP code: 28338
- Area codes: 910, 472
- FIPS code: 37-20840
- GNIS feature ID: 2406441
- Website: https://www.ellerbenc.com/

Ellerbe is a town in Richmond County, North Carolina, United States. As of the 2020 census, Ellerbe had a population of 864.

== History ==
In the 1700s Scottish settlers held a fair every May and November in the present location of Ellerbe, leading locals to dub the place "the Fair Grounds". W. T. Ellerbe later developed a spa nearby called Ellerbe Springs, and thereafter the community took its name. A railroad was built to Ellerbe in 1910 and a depot was constructed. The town was incorporated the following year. At the time it only had a population of 50. By 1923 it had grown to a population of over 500, with several mills, two banks, three churches, a telephone exchange, and a hotel. The rail line remained in service until 1954, and the depot burnt down several years later.

== Geography ==
According to the United States Census Bureau, the town has a total area of 1.5 square miles (3.9 km^{2}), all land.

== Demographics ==
Historical population
Census	Pop.	Note	%±
1920	473		—
1930	615		30.0%
1940	693		12.7%
1950	773		11.5%
1960	843		9.1%
1970	913		8.3%
1980	1,129		23.7%
1990	1,132		0.3%
2000	1,021		−9.8%
2010	1,054		3.2%
2020	864		−18.0%
U.S. Decennial Census

=== 2020 census ===
Ellerbe racial composition
Race	Number	Percentage
White (non-Hispanic)	399	46.18%
Black or African American (non-Hispanic)	270	31.25%
Native American	21	2.43%
Asian	1	0.12%
Other/Mixed	63	7.29%
Hispanic or Latino	110	12.73%

As of the 2020 United States census, there were 864 people, 398 households, and 284 families residing in the town.

=== 2000 census ===
As of the census of 2000, there were 1,021 people, 398 households, and 269 families residing in the town. The population density was 696.9 inhabitants per square mile (269.1/km^{2}). There were 447 housing units at an average density of 305.1 per square mile (117.8/km^{2}). The racial makeup of the town was 48.68% White, 46.13% African American, 0.20% Native American, 0.10% Asian, 4.90% from other races. Hispanic or Latino of any race were 8.42% of the population.

There were 398 households, out of which 32.7% had children under the age of 18 living with them, 37.9% were married couples living together, 25.4% had a female householder with no husband present, and 32.4% were non-families. 29.6% of all households were made up of individuals, and 13.8% had someone living alone who was 65 years of age or older. The average household size was 2.55 and the average family size was 3.16.

In the town, the population was spread out, with 30.7% under the age of 18, 7.8% from 18 to 24, 26.2% from 25 to 44, 19.8% from 45 to 64, and 15.5% who were 65 years of age or older. The median age was 33 years. For every 100 females, there were 82.3 males. For every 100 females age 18 and over, there were 74.8 males.

The median income for a household in the town was $21,118, and the median income for a family was $29,091. Males had a median income of $25,625 versus $16,544 for females. The per capita income for the town was $12,327. About 27.9% of families and 29.5% of the population were below the poverty line, including 42.9% of those under age 18 and 17.5% of those age 65 or over.

== Arts and culture ==
The Bostick School, Ellerbe Springs Hotel, Liberty Hill School, and Powell-Brookshire-Parker Farm are listed on the National Register of Historic Places.

== Notable people ==
- Andre the Giant - world-famous professional wrestler. Owned a farm in Ellerbe for many years where his ashes were spread after his death in Paris, France, in 1993.
- L. G. DeWitt - Trucking company owner and pioneer and track owner (Rockingham Speedway)
- Henry Frye - first African American N.C. Supreme Court judge (born in Ellerbe, NC)
- Thomas M. McInnis - first Republican State Senator for the 25th District
- Benny Parsons - NASCAR driver and television analyst who won the 1973 Winston Cup Championship and the 1975 Daytona 500.
