= South Carolina Highway 177 =

State highway in South Carolina

South Carolina Highway 177

Route information
- Maintained by SCDOT
- Length: 7.820 mi (12.585 km)
- Existed: 1960–present

Major junctions
- South end: SC 9 in Wallace
- North end: NC 177 at the North Carolina state line

Location
- Country: United States
- State: South Carolina
- Counties: Marlboro

Highway system
- South Carolina State Highway System; Interstate; US; State; Scenic
← US 176	→ US 178

South Carolina Highway 177 (SC 177) is a 7.820-mile (12.585 km) primary state highway in the U.S. state of South Carolina. It connects the community of Wallace with Hamlet, North Carolina.

== Route description ==
SC 177 is a two-lane rural highway that traverses from Wallace at SC 9 to the North Carolina state line.

== History ==
The highway was established in 1960 as a renumbering of SC 77, little has changed since.

Two predecessors existed before the current SC 177 came to existence. The first appeared from 1930-1936 as a new primary routing from U.S. Route 176 (US 176)/SC 10 in Spartanburg to the North Carolina state line; it eventually became part of SC 9. The second appeared from 1938-1951 as a new primary routing from US 176 southeast of Pomaria to US 76/SC 2 near Ballentine. It was adjusted twice, in 1948 extending and replacing SC 664, and in 1950 shifting to meet with US 176/SC 121 split. It was eventually renumbered as an extension of US 176.

=== South Carolina Highway 77 ===
South Carolina Highway 77
- Location: Wallace, South Carolina-NC State Line
- Length: 7.82 mi (12.59 km)
- Existed: 1937–1960

South Carolina Highway 77 (SC 77) was established in 1937 as a renumbering of SC 98 from Wallace to the North Carolina state line. In 1960, this became SC 177.

Another SC 77 reappeared only appeared on South Carolina official maps in 1981-1982 as a proposed segment of Interstate 77 (I-77) from US 76/US 378 to I-20. When the freeway eventually opened, it was simply labeled as I-77.

=== South Carolina Highway 664 ===
South Carolina Highway 664
- Location: Newberry County
- Existed: 1942–1948

South Carolina Highway 664 (SC 664) was established in 1941 or 1942 as a new primary routing between SC 177 and US 176. In 1948, it was renumbered to SC 177.

== Major intersections ==
The entire route is in Marlboro County.

Location	mi	km	Destinations	Notes
Wallace	0.000	0.000	SC 9 – Bennettsville, Cheraw	Southern terminus
	7.820	12.585	NC 177 north – Hamlet	Continuation into North Carolina
1.000 mi = 1.609 km; 1.000 km = 0.621 mi
