= Rockingham, North Carolina =

- City
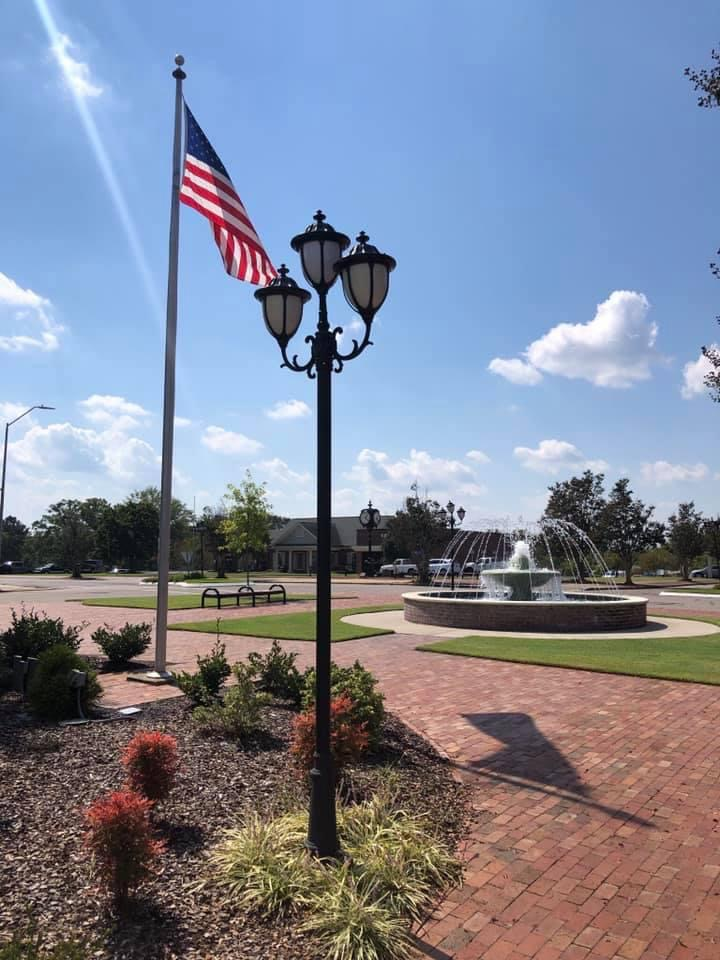
- City Square - Downtown Rockingham

- Seal
- Motto: "A City Looking Forward"
- Location within the state of North Carolina
- Coordinates: 34°56′19″N 79°45′39″W
- Country: United States
- State: North Carolina
- County: Richmond
- Incorporated: 1784

Area
  - Total: 7.65 sq mi (19.82 km^{2})
  - Land: 7.64 sq mi (19.80 km^{2})
  - Water: 0.012 sq mi (0.03 km^{2})
- Elevation: 266 ft (81 m)

Population (2020)
  - Total: 9,243
  - Density: 1,209.3/sq mi (466.93/km^{2})
- Time zone: UTC-5 (Eastern (EST))
  - Summer (DST): UTC-4 (EDT)
- ZIP codes: 28379-28380
- Area codes: 910, 472
- FIPS code: 37-57260
- GNIS feature ID: 2404637
- Website: gorockingham.com

Rockingham is a city in Richmond County, North Carolina, United States, named after the Marquess of Rockingham. The population was 9,243 at the 2020 census. It is the county seat of Richmond County.

Downtown Rockingham is currently being revitalized as a part of a ten-year plan named "Shaping Our Future: 2023". The city is currently experiencing an economic boom, with new businesses opening in the downtown area.

== History ==
The city was named for Charles Watson-Wentworth, 2nd Marquess of Rockingham, British Prime Minister from 1765 to 1766 and again in 1782. Rockingham's administration was dominated by the issue of the Thirteen Colonies. Rockingham wanted to repeal the Stamp Act 1765 and won a Commons vote in 1766 on the repeal resolution by 275 to 167. As a result, he was a popular figure among British colonists in America (who would later become known simply as "Americans"). People in North Carolina were still sympathetic toward him in the years following the United States gaining independence.

During the early 19th century, numerous families from here migrated to Middle Tennessee, settling in what is now Nolensville. They quickly established their new community.

In 1950, the town fielded a professional minor league baseball team in the Class D Tobacco State League, the Rockingham Eagles. The club won the playoff title in their only season before disbanding with the entire league.

Rockingham has a number of historic buildings which have been listed on the National Register of Historic Places since the late 1970s: the Bank of Pee Dee Building, Covington Plantation House, Alfred Dockery House, Hannah Pickett Mill No. 1, Manufacturers Building, Richmond County Courthouse, Roberdel Mill No. 1 Company Store, Rockingham Historic District, U.S. Post Office and Federal Building, and H. C. Watson House.

== Geography ==
Rockingham is situated in the south-central North Carolina Piedmont. It is located 61 miles (98 km) west of Lumberton, 61 miles (98 km) north of Florence, 70 miles (110 km) east of Charlotte, and 83 miles (134 km) south of Greensboro. According to the United States Census Bureau, the city has a total area of 7.65 square miles (19.8 km^{2}), of which 7.64 square miles (19.8 km^{2}) is land and 0.01 square miles (0.026 km^{2}) (0.13%) is water.

Rockingham's unincorporated suburbs within Richmond County that reside just outside the Rockingham-Hamlet statistical area: Cordova, East Rockingham, Dobbins Heights, Hoffman.

=== Urban ===
The Midtown business district is densely populated with stores, boutiques, clothing stores and several apartment complexes just outside the area. While not as urban as many cities in North Carolina, it is considered by the census as the urbanized area for Rockingham and Richmond County.

=== Neighborhoods ===
The Rockingham area is divided into various neighborhoods and suburbs; many include different socioeconomic classes. These include Cordova, Philadelphia, Ledbetter, Roberdell, East Rockingham, West Rockingham, Glenwood, Maplewood, East Side Park, and Knob Hill.

== Demographics ==
Historical population
Census	Pop.	Note	%±
1870	454		—
1900	1,507		—
1910	2,155		43.0%
1920	2,509		16.4%
1930	2,906		15.8%
1940	3,657		25.8%
1950	3,356		−8.2%
1960	5,512		64.2%
1970	5,852		6.2%
1980	8,300		41.8%
1990	9,399		13.2%
2000	9,672		2.9%
2010	9,558		−1.2%
2020	9,243		−3.3%
U.S. Decennial Census

As of the 2018 estimates, the area is a part of the Hamlet-Rockingham micropolitan statistical area and has a population of 22,579. The area will eventually be served by I-73/I-74, which will go west of the city. The area has many hotels, in part because beach traffic comes through this city.

=== 2020 census ===
As of the 2020 census, there were 9,243 people, 3,919 households, and 2,211 families residing in the city.

The median age was 39.2 years. 24.6% of residents were under the age of 18 and 18.8% of residents were 65 years of age or older. For every 100 females there were 84.2 males, and for every 100 females age 18 and over there were 78.0 males age 18 and over.

99.6% of residents lived in urban areas, while 0.4% lived in rural areas.

There were 3,919 households in Rockingham, of which 31.7% had children under the age of 18 living in them. Of all households, 30.7% were married-couple households, 18.3% were households with a male householder and no spouse or partner present, and 43.8% were households with a female householder and no spouse or partner present. About 36.3% of all households were made up of individuals and 16.8% had someone living alone who was 65 years of age or older.

There were 4,357 housing units, of which 10.1% were vacant. The homeowner vacancy rate was 2.5% and the rental vacancy rate was 8.8%.

Rockingham racial composition
Race	Number	Percentage
White (non-Hispanic)	4,668	50.5%
Black or African American (non-Hispanic)	3,274	35.42%
Native American	181	1.96%
Asian	131	1.42%
Pacific Islander	2	0.02%
Other/Mixed	453	4.9%
Hispanic or Latino	534	5.78%

=== 2010 census ===
As of the 2010 census, there were 9,553 people, 3,966 households, and 2,573 families residing in the city. The population density was 1,326.8 inhabitants per square mile (512.3/km^{2}). There were 4,375 housing units at an average density of 600.1 per square mile (231.7/km^{2}). The racial makeup of the city was 65.57% White, 29.90% African American, 1.10% Native American, 1.34% Asian, 0.06% Pacific Islander, 0.81% from other races, and 1.22% from two or more races. Hispanic or Latino of any race were 2.10% of the population.

There were 3,966 households, out of which 30.7% had children under the age of 18 living with them, 41.8% were married couples living together, 19.4% had a female householder with no husband present, and 35.1% were non-families. 32.1% of all households were made up of individuals, and 14.6% had someone living alone who was 65 years of age or older. The average household size was 2.33 and the average family size was 2.92.

In the city, 25.8% of the population was under the age of 18, 7.9% from 18 to 24, 27.2% from 25 to 44, 21.6% from 45 to 64, and 17.5% who were 65 years of age or older. The median age was 37 years. For every 100 females, there were 82.7 males. For every 100 females age 18 and over, there were 76.6 males.

The median income for a household in the city was $26,574, and the median income for a family was $33,534. Males had a median income of $27,923 versus $20,313 for females. The per capita income for the city was $15,426. About 18.0% of families and 20.4% of the population were below the poverty line, including 32.4% of those under age 18 and 15.0% of those age 65 or over.

== Arts and culture ==
=== Museums ===
- Discovery Place Kids-Rockingham

=== Events ===
Rockingham hosts "The Smokeout" (an annual motorcycle weekend), and has also hosted the Carolina Rebellion rock festival.

The city is the home of Rockingham Speedway, formerly the North Carolina Speedway. It was a staple of the NASCAR schedule for nearly 40 years before the race was discontinued in 2004. In the Spring of 2025, NASCAR returned to Rockingham Speedway with its Xfinity and Truck series.

== Education ==
Rockingham operated its own school system until 1968, when it was absorbed by the Richmond County School System.

The Leon Levine School of Business and Information Technology, part of Richmond Community College, is planned to be completed in downtown Rockingham, to offer post-graduate education to Rockingham. The building will be three stories tall, and is scheduled to be open for the 2020 fall semester. The school will offer programs including Accounting Specialist, IT Support — Healthcare, Healthcare Manager, Government Support Specialist, Cyber Security, Software and Web Developer, and Mobile Application Developer. The school will also provide classroom space for the college's Workforce and Economic Development division and Small Business Center.

Richmond Senior High School serves as the high school for Richmond County residents.

Rockingham also offers other education centers such as the Richmond Community College Main Campus.

A new three-story downtown Richmond Community College campus is being constructed and is expected to be open for the 2020 fall semester; it was originally planned to open in January, but got pushed back. It is expected to draw new businesses and retailers.

== Media ==
- WAYN, 900 AM, adult contemporary and easy listening music; sports
- WLWL, 770 AM, oldies with an emphasis on beach music

== Transportation ==
=== Air ===
Richmond County Airport (ICAO: KRCZ, FAA LID: RCZ), formerly known as Rockingham-Hamlet Airport, is located approximately 3 miles southeast of Rockingham. The airport serves local and transient general aviation flights.

Interstates and major highways

- Interstate 73 — Runs two miles north of Rockingham, will go west of Rockingham micropolitan area, when bypass is complete in 2023.
- Interstate 74 — Runs two miles north of Rockingham, and exists as Future I-74, along a 13-mile freeway south of Rockingham, named the G.R. Kindley Freeway. It is expected to be signed as I-74 when the 7.2 mile Rockingham Bypass is completed in 2023, and is planned to be routed to Myrtle Beach in the future.
- U.S. Route 220 — Runs north-south and goes through downtown Rockingham. A four-lane divided highway, it ends just south of Rockingham after merging with US 1.
- U.S. Route 1 — Runs north-south and goes through Rockingham in the heart of downtown. It then upgrades to a four-lane expressway when leaving Rockingham.
- U.S. Route 74 — Runs east-west and goes through Rockingham as US 74 Business; businesses are located on this stretch. US 74 upgrades to a four-lane freeway and bypasses Rockingham. It will become I-74, when the route is signed as such.

== Notable people ==
- Dante Bowe, singer and songwriter
- Bucky Covington, country singer and finalist on the fifth season of American Idol
- Charles B. Deane, member of the United States House of Representatives
- Charles B. Deane Jr., North Carolina state senator and lawyer
- Alfred Dockery, congressman and brigadier general of the Tennessee State Militia
- Dannell Ellerbe, NFL linebacker, two-time Super Bowl champion with the Baltimore Ravens and the Philadelphia Eagles
- Blind Boy Fuller, early blues artist; recorded some 120 works using the Piedmont blues finger-picking style
- Viola Gentry, aviator, best known for setting the first non-refueling endurance record for women
- Wayne Goodwin, current commissioner of NC Division of Motor Vehicles; former chair of the North Carolina Democratic party
- Melanie Wade Goodwin, former Democratic member of the North Carolina General Assembly; also represented the state's 66th House district for three terms
- Melvin Ingram, NFL linebacker, three-time Pro Bowl selection
- Leon Levine, founder of Family Dollar
- Brian Moehler, former MLB pitcher
- Alvin Morman, former MLB pitcher
- Cameron A. Morrison, 55th Governor of North Carolina; also formerly a U.S. Senator, a U.S. Representative, and Mayor of Rockingham
- Effie Wilder, writer
- The-Dream, singer, producer and songwriter
