= Powell–Brookshire–Parker Farm =

Historic farm in North Carolina, United States

- U.S. National Register of Historic Places
- U.S. Historic district
- Location within North Carolina Location within the United States
- Location: 1881 E. NC 73, near Ellerbe, North Carolina
- Coordinates: 35°08′07″N 79°53′17″W
- Area: 25 acres (10 ha)
- Built: c. 1870
- Architectural style: Greek Revival, Late Victorian
- NRHP reference No.: 07001410
- Added to NRHP: January 16, 2008

Powell–Brookshire–Parker Farm, also known as Summer Duck Farm, is a historic farm complex and national historic district located near Ellerbe, Richmond County, North Carolina. The main house, known as The Brookshire House, was built about 1870, and is a 1 1/2-story, rectangular, frame dwelling with a side gable roof. It has Greek Revival and Late Victorian style design elements. Also on the property are the contributing two dependencies (1940s), flowerhouse (c. 1940), corncrib and guano house (19th century), barn, watering trough, hog butchering scaffold (c. 1940), stock and hay barn (1937), gate, and the Powell–Brookshire Cemetery.

It was listed on the National Register of Historic Places in 2008.
