= Manufacturers Building (Rockingham, North Carolina) =

Historic building in North Carolina, US

- U.S. National Register of Historic Places
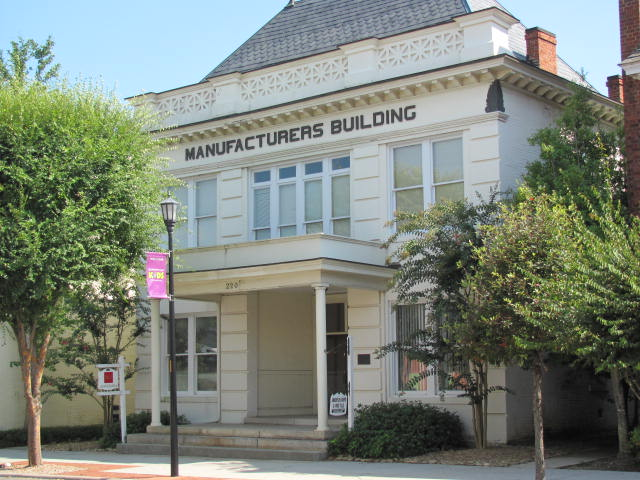
- Manufacturers Building, September 2014

- Location within North Carolina Location within the United States
- Location: 220 E. Washington St., Rockingham, North Carolina
- Coordinates: 34°56′21″N 79°46′22″W
- Area: less than one acre
- Built: c. 1904
- NRHP reference No.: 79003348
- Added to NRHP: May 29, 1979

Manufacturers Building is a historic commercial building located at Rockingham, Richmond County, North Carolina. It was built about 1904, and is a two-story, cream-colored brick commercial building. Its brickwork is in common bond. It has a high hipped and slate covered roof. The building served as the administrative offices for five of the most important textile mills in Richmond County—Pee Dee Manufacturing Company, Steele's Mills, Roberdel Mills, Midway Mills, and Hannah Pickett Mills.

It was listed on the National Register of Historic Places in 1979.
