= Cordova, North Carolina =

- CDP
- Location within North Carolina
- Coordinates: 34°54′37″N 79°48′43″W
- Country: United States
- State: North Carolina
- County: Richmond

Area
  - Total: 2.150 sq mi (5.57 km^{2})
  - Land: 2.129 sq mi (5.51 km^{2})
  - Water: 0.021 sq mi (0.054 km^{2})
- Elevation: 259 ft (79 m)

Population (2010)
  - Total: 1,775
  - Density: 833.7/sq mi (321.9/km^{2})
- Time zone: UTC-5 (Eastern (EST))
  - Summer (DST): UTC-4 (EDT)
- ZIP code: 28330
- Area codes: 910, 472
- GNIS feature ID: 2584312

Cordova is an unincorporated community and former census-designated place in Richmond County, North Carolina, United States. As of the 2020 census, Cordova had a population of 1,653. Cordova has a post office with ZIP code 28330.

Cordova is a suburban town of Rockingham.

== History ==
A post office, named Steeles Mill, existed in the area of Cordova as early as 1828. A Cordova post office was established in 1899.

== Geography ==
Cordova is located in southwest Richmond County along the Pee Dee River.

== Demographics ==
=== 2020 census ===
As of the 2020 census, Cordova had a population of 1,653. The median age was 43.9 years. 20.0% of residents were under the age of 18 and 19.2% of residents were 65 years of age or older. For every 100 females there were 97.0 males, and for every 100 females age 18 and over there were 90.5 males age 18 and over.

94.1% of residents lived in urban areas, while 5.9% lived in rural areas.

There were 684 households in Cordova, of which 30.1% had children under the age of 18 living in them. Of all households, 47.1% were married-couple households, 18.1% were households with a male householder and no spouse or partner present, and 30.0% were households with a female householder and no spouse or partner present. About 26.4% of all households were made up of individuals and 11.5% had someone living alone who was 65 years of age or older.

There were 738 housing units, of which 7.3% were vacant. The homeowner vacancy rate was 2.6% and the rental vacancy rate was 8.5%.

Racial composition as of the 2020 census
Race	Number	Percent
White	1,201	72.7%
Black or African American	239	14.5%
American Indian and Alaska Native	30	1.8%
Asian	19	1.1%
Native Hawaiian and Other Pacific Islander	1	0.1%
Some other race	63	3.8%
Two or more races	100	6.0%
Hispanic or Latino (of any race)	90	5.4%

== Works cited ==
- Powell, William S. (1976). The North Carolina Gazetteer: A Dictionary of Tar Heel Places. Chapel Hill: The University of North Carolina Press. ISBN 9780807812471.
