= Roberdel, North Carolina =

Roberdel, North Carolina Roberdell
- Census-designated place
- Location within North Carolina Location within the United States
- Coordinates: 34°58′38″N 79°44′45″W
- Country: United States
- State: North Carolina
- County: Richmond

Area
  - Total: 0.68 sq mi (1.76 km^{2})
  - Land: 0.66 sq mi (1.71 km^{2})
  - Water: 0.019 sq mi (0.05 km^{2})
- Elevation: 299 ft (91 m)

Population (2020)
  - Total: 246
  - Density: 372.7/sq mi (143.89/km^{2})
- Time zone: UTC-5 (Eastern (EST))
  - Summer (DST): UTC-4 (EDT)
- ZIP Code: 28379 (Rockingham)
- Area codes: 910, 472
- FIPS code: 37-57039
- GNIS feature ID: 2805283

Roberdel, also known as Roberdell, is an unincorporated community and census-designated place (CDP) in Richmond County, North Carolina, United States. It was first listed as a CDP in the 2020 census with a population of 246.

The community is in central Richmond County, 3 miles (5 km) north of Rockingham, the county seat. It sits on the north side of Hitchcock Creek, a southwest-flowing tributary of the Pee Dee River. The Roberdel Mill No. 1 Company Store was listed on the National Register of Historic Places in 1983.

== Demographics ==
Historical population
Census	Pop.	Note	%±
2020	246		—
U.S. Decennial Census; 2020

=== 2020 census ===
Roberdel CDP, North Carolina – Demographic Profile (NH = Non-Hispanic)
Race / Ethnicity	Pop 2020	% 2020
White alone (NH)	246	82.93%
Black or African American alone (NH)	3	1.22%
Native American or Alaska Native alone (NH)	4	1.63%
Asian alone (NH)	0	0.00%
Pacific Islander alone (NH)	0	0.00%
Some Other Race alone (NH)	0	0.00%
Mixed Race/Multi-Racial (NH)	13	5.28%
Hispanic or Latino (any race)	22	8.94%
Total	246	100.00%

Note: the US Census treats Hispanic/Latino as an ethnic category. This table excludes Latinos from the racial categories and assigns them to a separate category. Hispanics/Latinos can be of any race.
