= Richmond County Courthouse (North Carolina) =

- U.S. National Register of Historic Places
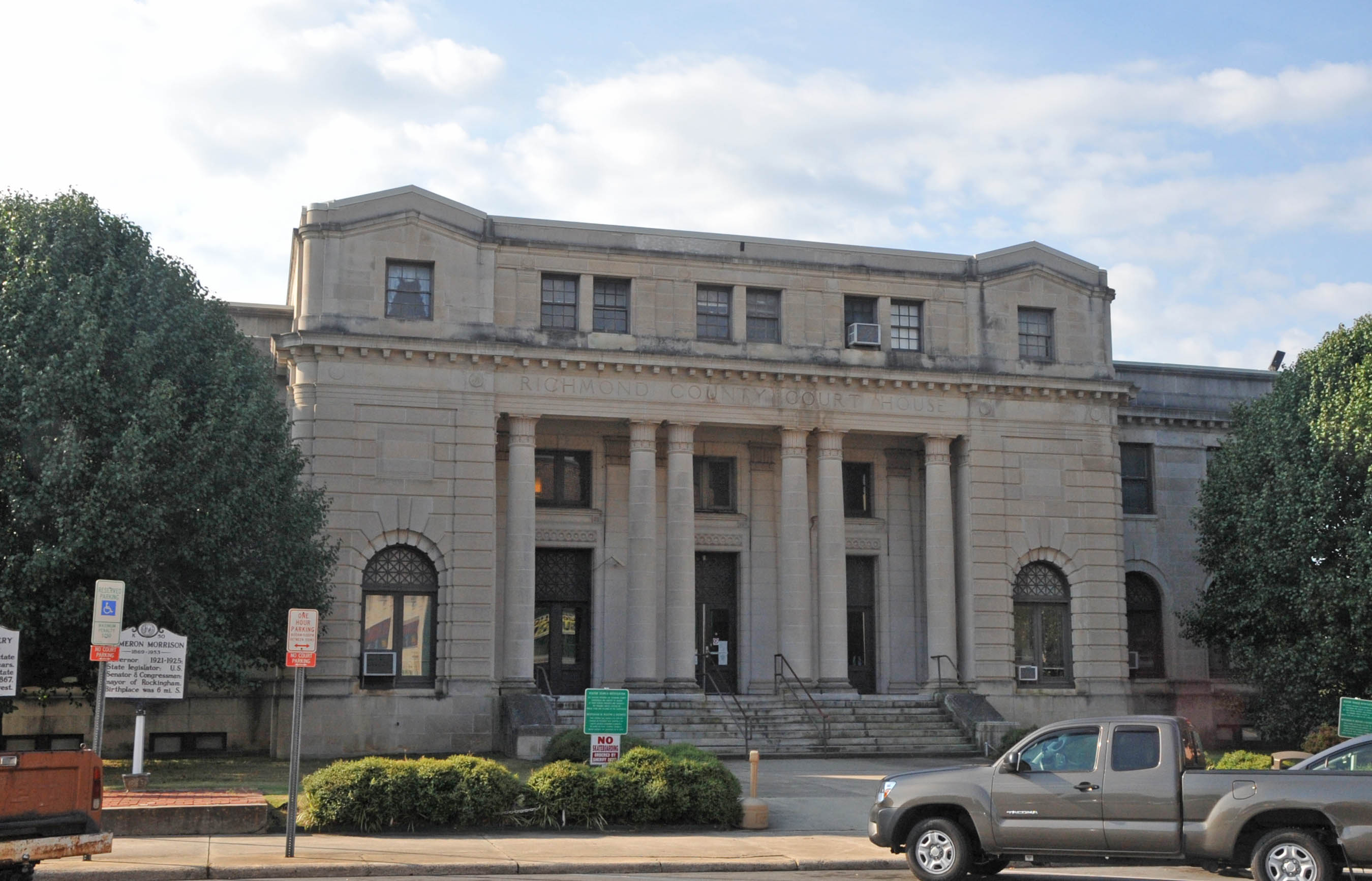
- Richmond County Courthouse, March 2007

- Location within North Carolina Location within the United States
- Location: W. Franklin St. between S. Hancock and S. Lee Sts., Rockingham, North Carolina
- Coordinates: 34°56′15″N 79°46′26″W
- Area: less than one acre
- Built: 1922–1923
- Built by: Little, J.P., & Son
- Architect: Hook, Charles C.
- Architectural style: Renaissance
- MPS: North Carolina County Courthouses TR
- NRHP reference No.: 79001747
- Added to NRHP: May 10, 1979

The Richmond County Courthouse is a historic courthouse located at Rockingham, Richmond County, North Carolina. It was designed by Charles Christian Hook and built in 1922–1923. It is a Renaissance Revival style ashlar veneer building that consists of a three-story central pavilion flanked by two-story wings. It features a hexastyle in antis portico.

It was listed on the National Register of Historic Places in 1979.
