= East Rockingham, North Carolina =

- CDP
- Location within the state of North Carolina
- Coordinates: 34°54′42″N 79°45′58″W
- Country: United States
- State: North Carolina
- County: Richmond

Area
  - Total: 3.44 sq mi (8.91 km^{2})
  - Land: 3.42 sq mi (8.85 km^{2})
  - Water: 0.023 sq mi (0.06 km^{2})
- Elevation: 295 ft (90 m)

Population (2020)
  - Total: 3,471
  - Density: 1,020/sq mi (392/km^{2})
- Time zone: UTC-5 (Eastern (EST))
  - Summer (DST): UTC-4 (EDT)
- FIPS code: 37-19800
- GNIS feature ID: 2402435

East Rockingham is a census-designated place (CDP) in Richmond County, North Carolina, United States. As of the 2020 census, East Rockingham had a population of 3,471.

== Geography ==
According to the United States Census Bureau, the CDP has a total area of 3.5 square miles (9.1 km^{2}), of which 3.4 square miles (8.9 km^{2}) is land and 0.04 square miles (0.10 km^{2}) (0.58%) is water.

== Demographics ==
Historical population
Census	Pop.	Note	%±
2020	3,471		—
U.S. Decennial Census

=== 2020 census ===
As of the 2020 census, East Rockingham had a population of 3,471. The median age was 38.5 years. 26.2% of residents were under the age of 18 and 16.0% of residents were 65 years of age or older. For every 100 females there were 99.1 males, and for every 100 females age 18 and over there were 93.7 males age 18 and over.

98.3% of residents lived in urban areas, while 1.7% lived in rural areas.

There were 1,357 households in East Rockingham, of which 33.3% had children under the age of 18 living in them. Of all households, 33.5% were married-couple households, 24.2% were households with a male householder and no spouse or partner present, and 30.6% were households with a female householder and no spouse or partner present. About 28.5% of all households were made up of individuals and 11.8% had someone living alone who was 65 years of age or older.

There were 1,572 housing units, of which 13.7% were vacant. The homeowner vacancy rate was 2.4% and the rental vacancy rate was 11.5%.

Racial composition as of the 2020 census
Race	Number	Percent
White	2,020	58.2%
Black or African American	687	19.8%
American Indian and Alaska Native	82	2.4%
Asian	27	0.8%
Native Hawaiian and Other Pacific Islander	2	0.1%
Some other race	382	11.0%
Two or more races	271	7.8%
Hispanic or Latino (of any race)	524	15.1%

=== 2000 census ===
As of the census of 2000, there were 3,885 people, 1,562 households, and 1,071 families residing in the CDP. The population density was 1,132.9 inhabitants per square mile (437.4/km^{2}). There were 1,752 housing units at an average density of 510.9 per square mile (197.3/km^{2}). The racial makeup of the CDP was 82.03% White, 11.94% African American, 1.80% Native American, 0.64% Asian, 0.15% Pacific Islander, 2.01% from other races, and 1.42% from two or more races. Hispanic or Latino of any race were 5.12% of the population.

There were 1,562 households, out of which 28.9% had children under the age of 18 living with them, 46.2% were married couples living together, 15.3% had a female householder with no husband present, and 31.4% were non-families. 27.3% of all households were made up of individuals, and 12.4% had someone living alone who was 65 years of age or older. The average household size was 2.48 and the average family size was 2.96.

In the CDP, the population was spread out, with 24.4% under the age of 18, 9.0% from 18 to 24, 28.4% from 25 to 44, 24.1% from 45 to 64, and 14.1% who were 65 years of age or older. The median age was 37 years. For every 100 females, there were 94.3 males. For every 100 females age 18 and over, there were 93.6 males.

The median income for a household in the CDP was $22,263, and the median income for a family was $26,827. Males had a median income of $26,050 versus $18,608 for females. The per capita income for the CDP was $12,132. About 24.2% of families and 26.9% of the population were below the poverty line, including 35.0% of those under age 18 and 27.0% of those age 65 or over.
