= Hoffman, North Carolina =

- Town
- Hoffman Town Hall and Fire Station

- Location within the state of North Carolina
- Coordinates: 35°01′53″N 79°32′57″W
- Country: United States
- State: North Carolina
- County: Richmond

Area
  - Total: 3.40 sq mi (8.81 km^{2})
  - Land: 3.40 sq mi (8.81 km^{2})
  - Water: 0 sq mi (0.00 km^{2})
- Elevation: 427 ft (130 m)

Population (2020)
  - Total: 418
  - Density: 122.9/sq mi (47.44/km^{2})
- Time zone: UTC-5 (Eastern (EST))
  - Summer (DST): UTC-4 (EDT)
- ZIP code: 28347
- Area codes: 910, 472
- FIPS code: 37-31920
- GNIS feature ID: 2405848
- Website: http://townofhoffman.com/

Hoffman is a town in Richmond County, North Carolina, United States. As of the 2020 census, Hoffman had a population of 418. It was named for a family of settlers.

== Geography ==
According to the United States Census Bureau, the town has a total area of 3.4 square miles (8.8 km^{2}), all land.

== Demographics ==
Historical population
Census	Pop.	Note	%±
1900	184		—
1910	175		−4.9%
1920	385		120.0%
1930	569		47.8%
1940	395		−30.6%
1950	398		0.8%
1960	344		−13.6%
1970	434		26.2%
1980	389		−10.4%
1990	348		−10.5%
2000	624		79.3%
2010	588		−5.8%
2020	418		−28.9%
U.S. Decennial Census

As of the census of 2000, there were 624 people, 219 households, and 167 families residing in the town. The population density was 181.6 inhabitants per square mile (70.1/km^{2}). There were 238 housing units at an average density of 69.3 per square mile (26.8/km^{2}). The racial makeup of the town was 41.19% White, 53.21% African American, 4.17% Native American, and 1.44% from two or more races. Hispanic or Latino of any race were 1.12% of the population.

There were 219 households, out of which 41.6% had children under the age of 18 living with them, 47.0% were married couples living together, 21.5% had a female householder with no husband present, and 23.7% were non-families. 18.7% of all households were made up of individuals, and 7.3% had someone living alone who was 65 years of age or older. The average household size was 2.82 and the average family size was 3.14.

In the town, the population was spread out, with 33.0% under the age of 18, 7.4% from 18 to 24, 32.9% from 25 to 44, 17.8% from 45 to 64, and 9.0% who were 65 years of age or older. The median age was 31 years. For every 100 females, there were 101.3 males. For every 100 females age 18 and over, there were 94.4 males.

The median income for a household in the town was $32,279, and the median income for a family was $34,688. Males had a median income of $25,893 versus $16,838 for females. The per capita income for the town was $14,726. About 17.2% of families and 24.5% of the population were below the poverty line, including 34.3% of those under age 18 and 16.7% of those age 65 or over.
