= Richmond County, North Carolina =

County in North Carolina, United States

- County
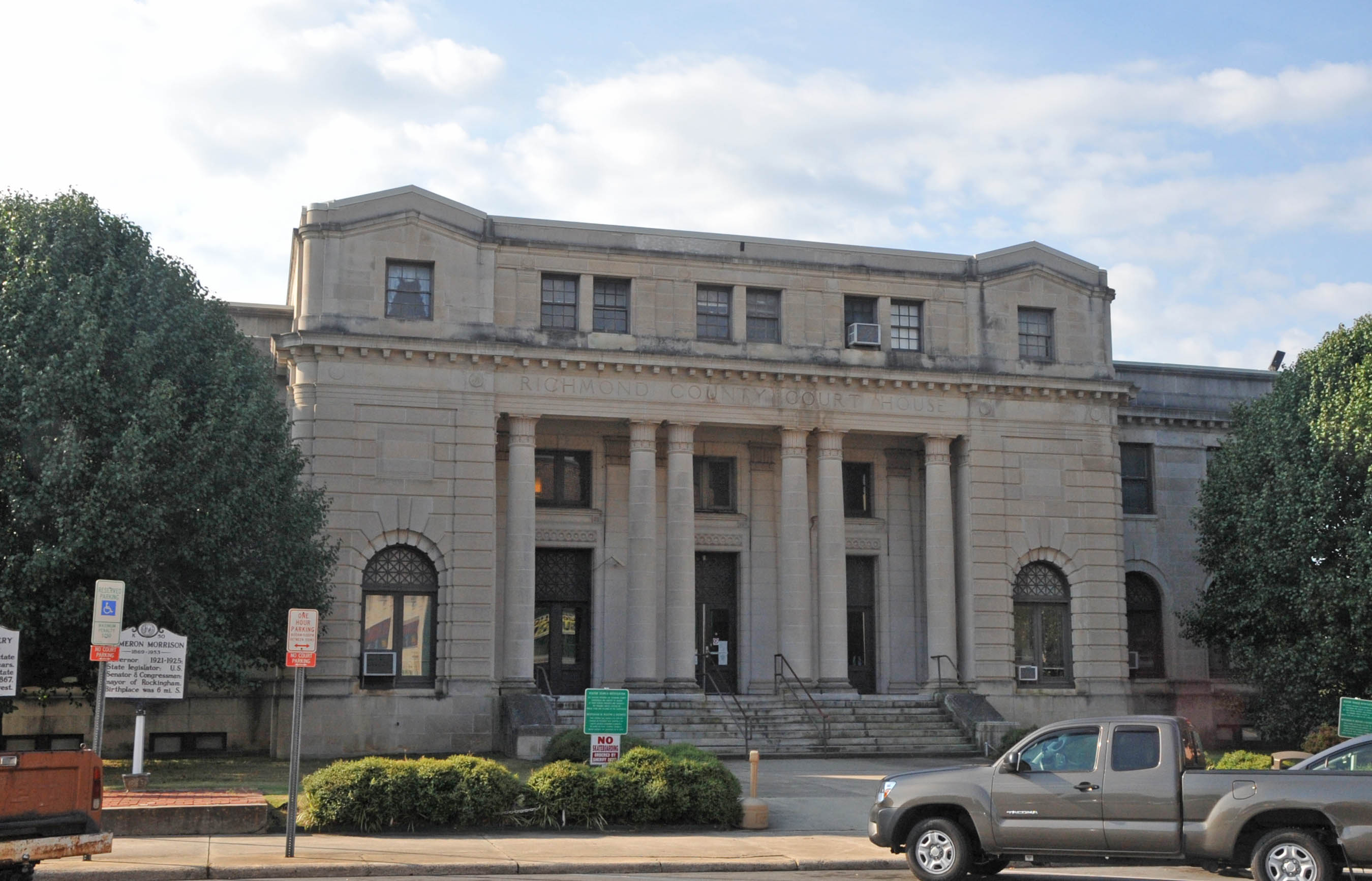
- Richmond County Courthouse in Rockingham

- Flag Seal
- Motto(s): "Fiat Justicia" (Latin) (Let Justice Be Done)
- Location within the U.S. state of North Carolina
- Coordinates: 35.00°N 79.76°W
- Country: United States
- State: North Carolina
- Founded: November 10, 1779
- Named for: Charles Lennox, 3rd Duke of Richmond and Lennox
- Seat: Rockingham
- Largest community: Rockingham

Area
  - Total: 479.70 sq mi (1,242.4 km^{2})
  - Land: 473.69 sq mi (1,226.9 km^{2})
  - Water: 6.01 sq mi (15.6 km^{2}) 1.25%

Population (2020)
  - Total: 42,946
  - Estimate (2025): 42,041 ▼
  - Density: 90.66/sq mi (35.00/km^{2})
- Time zone: UTC−5 (Eastern)
  - Summer (DST): UTC−4 (EDT)
- Congressional district: 8th
- Website: www.richmondnc.com

Richmond County is a county located on the central southern border of the U.S. state of North Carolina. Its county seat is Rockingham. The county was formed in 1779 from a portion of Anson County and named in honor of Charles Lennox, 3rd Duke of Richmond and Lennox. As of the 2020 census, the population was 42,946.

== History ==
=== Early history ===
The earliest inhabitants of the land eventually comprising Richmond County were Cheraw Native Americans. The first European settlers in the area were Scottish Highlanders, who traveled up the Cape Fear River valley to find farmland. English settlers initially arrived in the northwestern section of the eventual county after traveling down the Pee Dee River and gradually became the dominant European-descent group in the area. Many early settlers reared cattle. Politically, the area was first organized as a portion of Bladen County and then eventually Anson County.

=== Creation and Antebellum period ===
Richmond County was formed in 1779 from a portion of Anson in order to reduce the amount of travel needed by residents to reach a county courthouse. It was named for Charles Lennox, 3rd Duke of Richmond and Lennox who was an Englishman and a member of the Parliament of the United Kingdom who sided with the colonists in America during the American Revolution. The county seat was established at Richmond Court House, which was renamed Rockingham in 1785 in homage to Charles Watson-Wentworth, 2nd Marquess of Rockingham, a British politician who had friendly relations with the Americans. During the American Revolutionary War, Richmond was afflicted by numerous Loyalist raids. By 1790, the county had 5,885 residents, with 583 of them being slaves.

Following the war, area farmers moved away from cattle switched to growing corn, oats, indigo, and cotton. In 1837, the county's first textile mill, Richmond Manufacturing Company, was built. A growth in cotton production, concentrated in the western portion of the county, led the enslaved population to increase to the point where they made up half of local residents. Around 1850 the largely unused Sandhills region in the eastern section of the county began to be exploited by the naval stores industry, particularly for the harvest of turpentine from longleaf pines. Railway service was introduced in Richmond in 1861.

=== Civil War and Reconstruction era ===
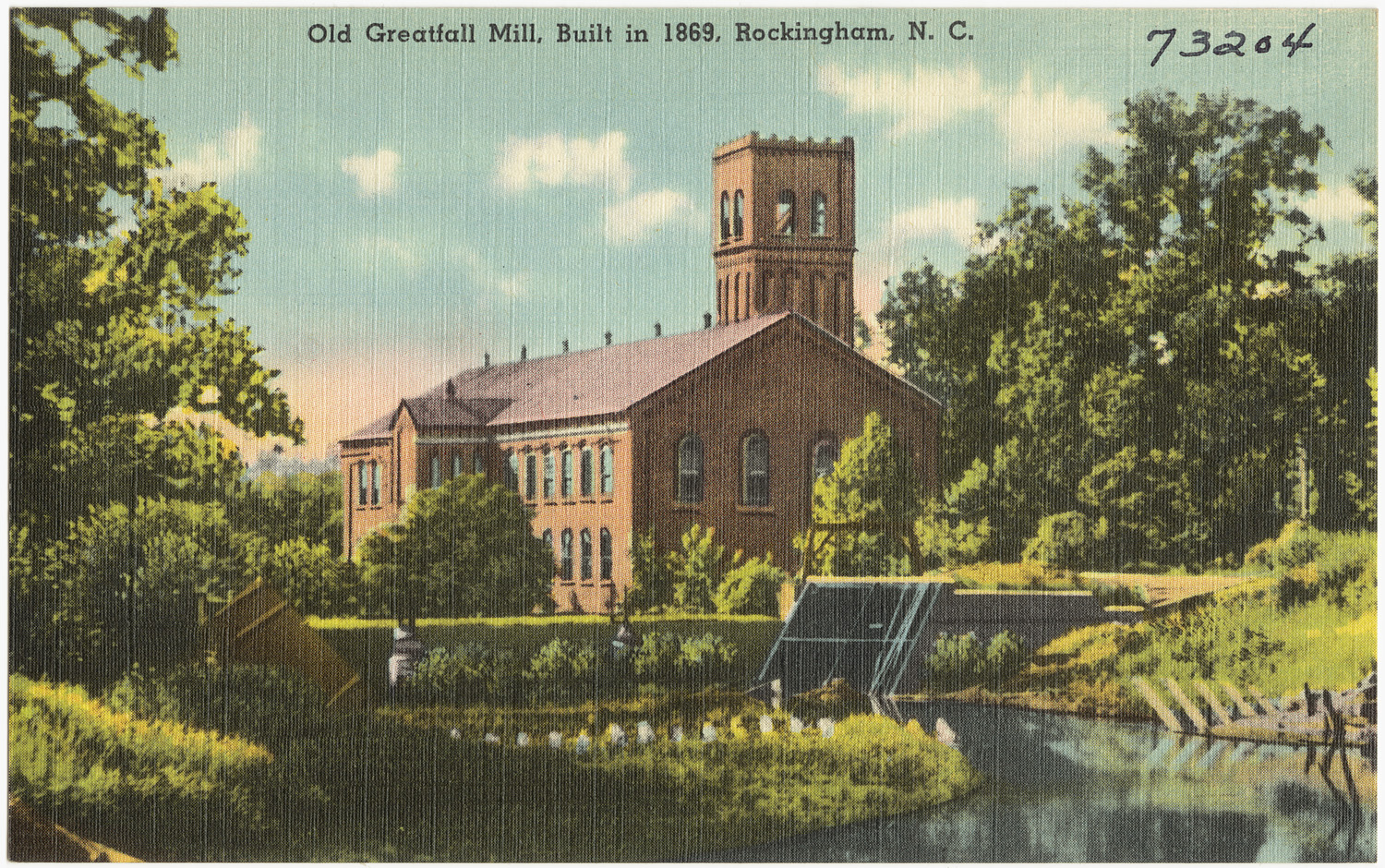
The Great Falls Cotton Mill was built in 1869.

During the American Civil War, Richmond County had troops serve in various units of the Confederate States Army, including the Pee Dee Guards, Scotch Boys, and the Harrington Light Artillery. Federal troops under General William Tecumseh Sherman entered Richmond County in March 1865. Confederate troops fled, and the federal forces sabotaged local industry before moving north. The Richmond Manufacturing Company mill, having been burned, was rebuilt as the Great Falls Mill in 1869. That year rail service was extended to Rockingham. A second cotton mill was built in 1876 and rapidly followed by more textile plants. Cotton production increased after the war and remained a significant crop in the county until the mid-1900s. Farmers also began diversifying their crops, with tobacco and peach trees growing in popularity, with peach orchards being concentrated in the Sandhills.

By the late 1800s, Richmond County had a majority black population and tended to support the Republican Party in elections, while the state of North Carolina was dominated by the Democratic Party. In response to this, white Democrats built up a political base in Laurinburg. During the state legislative elections of 1898, Democrats organized intensely in the area to unseat the Fusionist coalition of state Republicans and Populists, including the deployment of paramilitary Red Shirts in Laurinburg to intimidate blacks and other opponents at the polls. Democrats regained a majority in the General Assembly. In tribute to the efforts of Democrats in Laurinburg, on February 20, 1899, the assembly split off the town and the surrounding area from Richmond County and created the new Scotland County, which began operating as an effective unit of government in December the following year.

=== Development ===
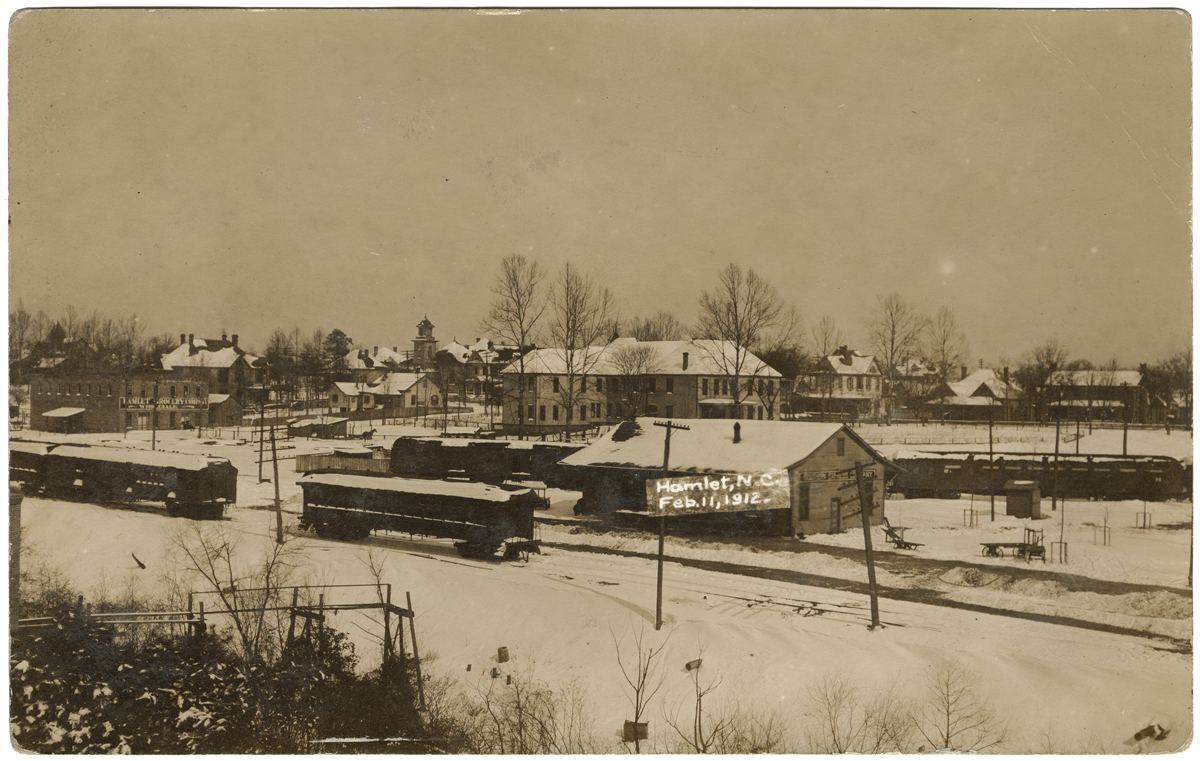
Hamlet (pictured in 1912) developed as a railway town in the early 1900s.

At the turn of the century, Richmond County's economy revolved around agriculture and textile mills in Rockingham. In the early 1900s, Hamlet grew as a center for the Seaboard Air Line Railroad, which had five lines cross through the town. The railway created numerous jobs and, in conjunction with the establishment of Blewett Falls Dam and its hydroelectric power, facilitated the expansion of the textile industry. By the end of World War II, Richmond County hosted ten textile mills which employed as many as 15,000 people. Through the 1940s, most of the independent mills were acquired by larger outside corporations and many began producing non-cotton fabrics, facilitating a local decline in cotton production. Seaboard established an $11 million classification yard, the first one in the Southeastern United States, about one mile north of Hamlet in 1954. In 1968 the county, Rockingham, and Hamlet school systems merged.

=== Economic decline ===
Hamlet's economic situation came under strain beginning in the 1960s, as the railroad faced increasing competition from growing road networks, trucking, and air travel. Seaboard acquired smaller competitors and consolidated its operations, moving workers out of the area. It also froze wages, terminated some positions, and reduced passenger services, diminishing the number of outside visitors. Seaboard became CSX Transportation in 1986. Foreign competition and increasing automation led the county textile industry to cut jobs, and by the 1970s mills in Richmond only retained about 5,000 workers. Declines in textile employment continued through the 1980s and 1990s. In 1986, the county's single largest manufacturing employer, Clark Equipment Company, closed its plant in Rockingham. Many of the remaining available manufacturing jobs required skilled labor which the county lacked. The traditional railroad and manufacturing jobs were supplanted by menial service positions and work in food processing plants, while local small businesses were displaced by national retail chains.

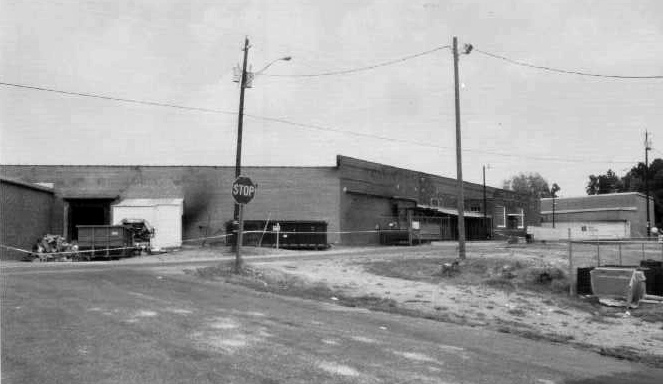
A 1991 fire at the Imperial Food Products plant (pictured) in Hamlet led to 25 deaths and a record fine from state regulators.

In 1986, the Southeast Interstate Low-Level Radioactive Waste Management Compact voted to build a low-level radioactive waste disposal site in North Carolina. In November 1989, Chem-Nuclear Systems, the contractor in charge of constructing the disposal facility, announced a prospective Richmond County site for the nuclear waste. Local residents promptly formed For Richmond County Environment (FORRCE) to lobby against the site. The group attracted wide grassroots support across Richmond, including significant backing from both white and black communities and both of the county's major municipalities, Hamlet and Rockingham. FORRCE conducted an opposition petition drive and obtained 26,756 signatures, over 60 percent of the county's total population. Under significant political pressure, local officials denounced the site, and 1,200 residents traveled to Raleigh to deliver the FORRCE petition to the governor. In 1993, a state panel voted to move the site to Wake County, but listed the Richmond location as its second choice. The project was later abandoned under scrutiny from state regulators.

On September 3, 1991, a fire broke at the Imperial Food Products plant in Hamlet. Many exits at the plant were locked in violation of fire codes, and 24 workers and one visiting delivery driver died in the conflagration. Emmett J. Roe, the plant owner, was sentenced to 19 years in prison for the involuntary manslaughter. State authorities imposed a record fine upon the company for the violations and the incident brought negative national attention to the town. National declines in textiles through the 1990s and into the early 2000s further strained the county's economy; from 1993 to 2005, the county suffered nine textile mill closures and the loss of 1,730 mill jobs. Unemployment rates worsened after the Great Recession commenced in December 2007.

== Geography ==
Interactive map of Richmond County

According to the U.S. Census Bureau, the county has a total area of 479.70 square miles (1,242.4 km^{2}), of which 473.69 square miles (1,226.9 km^{2}) is land and 6.01 square miles (15.6 km^{2}) (1.25%) is water. It is the 38th largest county in the state by land area. It is bordered by Montgomery County, Moore County, Scotland County, Anson County, and Marlboro County in South Carolina. Richmond lies along the Atlantic Seaboard Fall Line and rests at the convergence of the Piedmont, Sandhills, and Coastal Plain physiographic regions, with the Piedmont making up most of the western part of the county and the Sandhills and Coastal Plain predominating in the center and east. The Uwharrie Mountains extend along the county's western border.

Nearly three-fourths of the county lies within the Great Pee Dee River drainage basin, with the remainder mostly draining into Drowning Creek, the headwaters of the Lumber River. The county hosts several lakes/reservoirs (like Blewett Falls Lake) and creeks. Most of the county is forested. Longleaf pine grows naturally in the area. Significant amounts of longleaf pine forest are preserved in the Sandhills Game Land, over half of which is in Richmond County. Pee Dee River Game Land is also partially located in the county. Agricultural land in Richmond is home to many landbirds, including loggerhead shrike and vesper sparrow. The Pee Dee National Wildlife Refuge, which covers part of the county and includes grassland and swamps, hosts numerous migratory waterfowl and white-tailed deer.

== Demographics ==
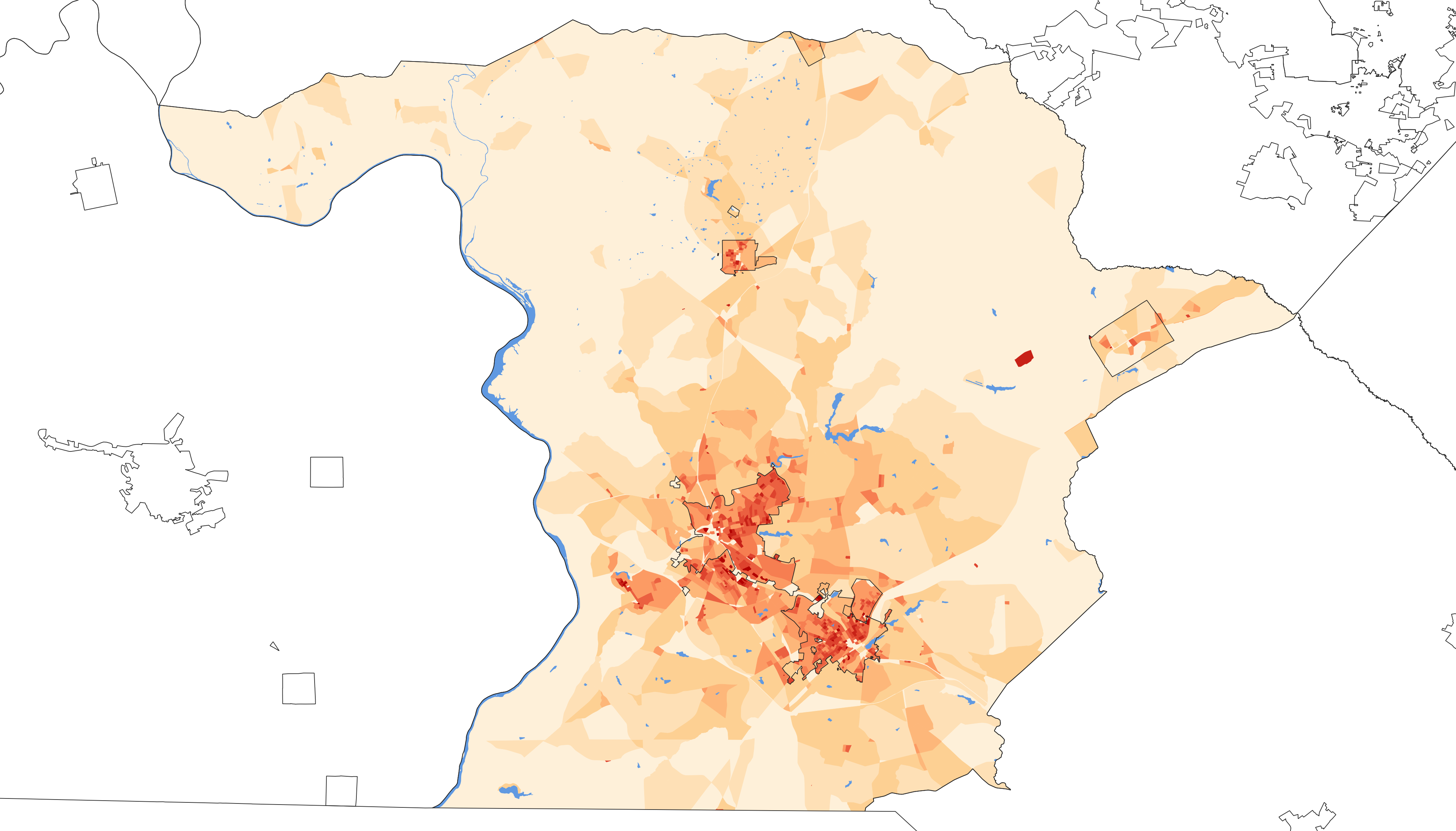
2020 population density of Richmond County NC by census block

=== Racial and ethnic composition ===
Richmond County, North Carolina – Racial and ethnic composition Note: the US Census treats Hispanic/Latino as an ethnic category. This table excludes Latinos from the racial categories and assigns them to a separate category. Hispanics/Latinos may be of any race.
Race / Ethnicity (NH = Non-Hispanic)	Pop 1980	Pop 1990	Pop 2000	Pop 2010	Pop 2020	% 1980	% 1990	% 2000	% 2010	% 2020
White alone (NH)	32,646	30,729	29,522	27,369	23,610	71.78%	69.03%	63.40%	58.68%	54.98%
Black or African American alone (NH)	11,950	12,798	14,160	14,159	12,770	26.27%	28.75%	30.41%	30.36%	29.74%
Native American or Alaska Native alone (NH)	443	502	748	1,069	994	0.97%	1.13%	1.61%	2.29%	2.31%
Asian alone (NH)	57	192	299	419	360	0.13%	0.43%	0.64%	0.90%	0.84%
Native Hawaiian or Pacific Islander alone (NH)	x	x	4	15	7	x	x	0.01%	0.03%	0.02%
Other race alone (NH)	22	4	26	63	167	0.05%	0.01%	0.06%	0.14%	0.39%
Mixed race or Multiracial (NH)	x	x	486	804	1,966	x	x	1.04%	1.72%	4.58%
Hispanic or Latino (any race)	363	293	1,319	2,741	3,072	0.80%	0.66%	2.83%	5.88%	7.15%
Total	45,481	44,518	46,564	46,639	42,946	100.00%	100.00%	100.00%	100.00%	100.00%

=== 2020 census ===
As of the 2020 census, there were 42,946 people, 17,454 households, and 11,783 families residing in the county. The median age was 41.5 years, with 22.6% of residents under the age of 18 and 19.0% of residents 65 years of age or older. For every 100 females there were 95.6 males, and for every 100 females age 18 and over there were 92.7 males age 18 and over.

The racial makeup of the county was 55.8% White, 30.0% Black or African American, 2.4% American Indian and Alaska Native, 0.8% Asian, <0.1% Native Hawaiian and Pacific Islander, 5.2% from some other race, and 5.7% from two or more races. Hispanic or Latino residents of any race comprised 7.2% of the population.

55.5% of residents lived in urban areas, while 44.5% lived in rural areas.

Of the county's 17,454 households, 30.3% had children under the age of 18 living in them, 38.5% were married-couple households, 20.0% were households with a male householder and no spouse or partner present, and 34.4% were households with a female householder and no spouse or partner present. About 30.4% of all households were made up of individuals and 14.2% had someone living alone who was 65 years of age or older.

There were 19,605 housing units, of which 11.0% were vacant. Among occupied housing units, 64.9% were owner-occupied and 35.1% were renter-occupied. The homeowner vacancy rate was 1.7% and the rental vacancy rate was 8.2%.

Richmond County comprises the Rockingham, NC Micropolitan Statistical Area.

=== 2010 census ===
At the 2010 census, there were 46,564 people, 17,873 households, and 12,582 families residing in the county. The population density was 98 people per square mile (38 people/km^{2}). There were 19,886 housing units at an average density of 42 units per square mile (16 units/km^{2}). The racial makeup of the county was 56.5% White, 31.70% Black or African American, 0.60% Native American, 2.10% Asian, 0.03% Pacific Islander, 1.08% from other races, and 1.18% from two or more races. 5.90% of the population were Hispanic or Latino of any race.

There were 17,873 households, out of which 32.10% had children under the age of 18 living with them, 48.30% were married couples living together, 17.00% had a female householder with no husband present, and 29.60% were non-families. 26.30% of all households were made up of individuals, and 11.20% had someone living alone who was 65 years of age or older. The average household size was 2.51 and the average family size was 3.01.

In the county, the population was spread out, with 25.80% under the age of 18, 10.10% from 18 to 24, 27.70% from 25 to 44, 22.80% from 45 to 64, and 13.60% who were 65 years of age or older. The median age was 36 years. For every 100 females there were 96.30 males. For every 100 females age 18 and over, there were 92.70 males.

The median income for a household in the county was $28,830, and the median income for a family was $35,226. Males had a median income of $27,308 versus $20,453 for females. The per capita income for the county was $14,485. About 15.90% of families and 19.60% of the population were below the poverty line, including 26.70% of those under age 18 and 18.90% of those age 65 or over.

=== Demographic change ===
Historical population

Historical population
Census	Pop.	Note	%±
1790	5,053		—
1800	5,623		11.3%
1810	6,695		19.1%
1820	7,537		12.6%
1830	9,396		24.7%
1840	8,909		−5.2%
1850	9,818		10.2%
1860	11,009		12.1%
1870	12,882		17.0%
1880	18,245		41.6%
1890	23,948		31.3%
1900	15,855		−33.8%
1910	19,673		24.1%
1920	25,567		30.0%
1930	34,016		33.0%
1940	36,810		8.2%
1950	39,597		7.6%
1960	39,202		−1.0%
1970	39,889		1.8%
1980	45,481		14.0%
1990	44,518		−2.1%
2000	46,564		4.6%
2010	46,639		0.2%
2020	42,946		−7.9%
2025 (est.)	42,041	▼	−2.1%
U.S. Decennial Census; 1790–1960 1900–1990; 1990–2000 2010 2020

Between 2010 and 2022, the county lost about 3,900 residents.

== Law and government ==
=== Government ===
Richmond County is governed by a seven-member board of commissioners. The commissioners are elected at-large in four-year staggered terms beginning the first Monday of December following the November in which they were elected. The commissioners select one of their own to serve as chairman and another to serve as vice-chairman. The board sets county policy, passes ordinances, and hires the county manager. The manager serves as the chief executive officer of the county government. They execute the commissioners' directives and represent the county in intergovernmental dealings. The county government is funded by a local property tax.

Richmond County is a member of the Lumber River Council of Governments, a regional planning board representing five counties. It is located in North Carolina's 9th and 8th congressional districts, the North Carolina Senate's 29th district, and the North Carolina House of Representatives' 52nd district. The United States Army operates Camp Mackall, which partially lies within the county.

=== Law enforcement and judicial system ===
Richmond County lies within the bounds of the 21st Prosecutorial District, the 16A Superior Court District, and the 16A District Court District. County voters elect a sheriff. Law enforcement is provided across the county by the sheriff's office, while the cities of Hamlet and Rockingham retain their own police departments.

=== Politics ===
United States presidential election results for Richmond County, North Carolina
Year	Republican		Democratic		Third party(ies)	
Year	No.	%	No.	%	No.	%
1912	82	5.17%	1,319	83.17%	185	11.66%
1916	650	29.51%	1,553	70.49%	0	0.00%
1920	1,124	25.17%	3,341	74.83%	0	0.00%
1924	599	18.50%	2,475	76.46%	163	5.04%
1928	2,045	40.74%	2,975	59.26%	0	0.00%
1932	693	12.39%	4,862	86.96%	36	0.64%
1936	607	8.30%	6,709	91.70%	0	0.00%
1940	779	10.66%	6,530	89.34%	0	0.00%
1944	938	14.81%	5,394	85.19%	0	0.00%
1948	866	14.24%	4,376	71.95%	840	13.81%
1952	3,361	31.41%	7,340	68.59%	0	0.00%
1956	2,907	30.60%	6,592	69.40%	0	0.00%
1960	3,285	28.37%	8,293	71.63%	0	0.00%
1964	3,123	26.83%	8,516	73.17%	0	0.00%
1968	2,865	22.78%	4,257	33.84%	5,457	43.38%
1972	5,692	60.84%	3,508	37.49%	156	1.67%
1976	2,848	24.42%	8,793	75.39%	23	0.20%
1980	3,911	33.69%	7,416	63.88%	282	2.43%
1984	6,807	47.50%	7,494	52.30%	29	0.20%
1988	5,073	41.39%	7,151	58.34%	33	0.27%
1992	4,356	28.01%	9,163	58.91%	2,034	13.08%
1996	3,973	31.04%	7,564	59.09%	1,264	9.87%
2000	6,263	43.89%	7,935	55.61%	71	0.50%
2004	7,709	47.75%	8,383	51.92%	53	0.33%
2008	9,424	48.76%	9,713	50.26%	190	0.98%
2012	9,332	48.06%	9,904	51.01%	181	0.93%
2016	10,383	53.72%	8,501	43.98%	444	2.30%
2020	11,830	56.98%	8,754	42.16%	179	0.86%
2024	11,931	60.04%	7,787	39.18%	155	0.78%

Richmond County was long politically dominated by Democrats. R. W. Goodman, who served as sheriff of Richmond County from 1950 to 1994, was the boss of a conservative Democratic courthouse machine. He held wide influence in determining who served in local government and represented the county in the North Carolina General Assembly. During his tenure Democrats dominated local offices and the politics of the county was largely conservative. A majority of the county electorate voted for Democratic U.S. presidential candidate Barack Obama in 2012, but Republican presidential candidate Donald Trump won by a 10 percent margin in 2016. Following the 2020 elections, Republicans gained a majority of the seats on the county board of commissioners. In 2022 Republicans won a majority of local elections in the county and gained control of all of the seats on the board of commissioners. As of March 2022, Richmond County had 27,358 registered voters of whom 12,346 were Democrats and 6,925 were Republicans. In the 2026 elections, Republicans retained majorities in most races, though a Democrat won one seat on the county commission.

== Economy ==
Richmond County is classified as economically distressed by the North Carolina Department of Commerce. In 2022, the county experienced some success in industrial recruitment as several manufacturers expanded their local workforces and operations. According to the American Community Survey, from 2017 to 2021 the estimated median household income was $38,962.

== Transportation ==
Richmond County is served by Interstate 73 and Interstate 74 (sections of both interstates remain incomplete or designated within the county). The Rockingham Bypass, a part of both routes, is scheduled to be completed in 2025. The county is served by U.S. Route 1, US 74 (Bus.), US 220, as well as North Carolina Highway 38, NC 73, NC 109, NC 177, and NC 381. County government supports a public transport bus service, the Area of Richmond Transportation. Local rail service is provided by CSX Transportation, which maintains several yards and other facilities in Hamlet. Amtrak's Silver Star passenger train has a stop in Hamlet. Airplane facilities are provided by the Richmond County Airport.

== Education ==
Public education is provided by Richmond County Schools, which operates seven elementary schools, four middle schools, and four secondary schools. As across the rest of the state, the county education system was heavily impacted by the COVID-19 pandemic. For the 2021/2022 school year, of 9,085 tested students, 56.1 percent were deemed non-proficient with regards to state standards. The Richmond Community College, based in Hamlet, serves the county. According to the 2021 American Community Survey, an estimated 17.5 percent of county residents have attained a bachelor's degree or higher level of education.

== Sports ==
=== NASCAR ===
The Rockingham Speedway opened in 1965 and served as a regular venue for NASCAR Cup Series events until 2004. It is currently used for the NASCAR O'Reilly Auto Parts Series (North Carolina Education Lottery 250), NASCAR Craftsman Truck Series (Black's Tire 200), and ARCA Menards Series East (Rockingham ARCA Menards Series East 125). A nearby dragway remains in regular use.

=== Football ===
The Raiders, the football team of Richmond Senior High School, has long been popular among county residents.

== Culture ==
Since 1982, Hamlet has hosted the Seaboard Festival, a community gathering including local vendors, running events, and music, designed to celebrate Hamlet's historical connections to the railroad.

The Pee Dee National Wildlife Refuge is a popular regional destination for hunting and fishing. Quail hunting has long been popular in Richmond County and in the larger Sandhills region.

Several area buildings and sites have been listed on the National Register of Historic Places.

== Communities ==
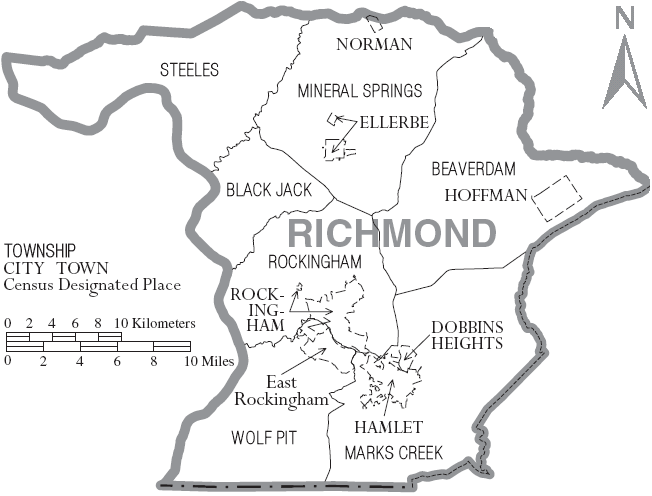
Map of Richmond County with municipal and township labels

=== Cities ===
- Rockingham (county seat and largest community)
- Hamlet

=== Towns ===
- Dobbins Heights
- Ellerbe
- Hoffman
- Norman

=== Census-designated places ===
- East Rockingham
- Roberdel

=== Other unincorporated communities ===
- Cordova (former CDP)
- Fruitland
- Marston

=== Townships ===
- Steeles
- Mineral Springs
- Beaverdam
- Mark's Creek
- Wolf Pit
- Rockingham
- Blackjack

== Notable people ==
- Wayne Goodwin, politician and government official
- Henry Frye, former member of the state legislature, former state supreme court chief justice
- Leon Levine, founder of Family Dollar
- John Coltrane, jazz saxophonist
- Cameron A. Morrison, North Carolina governor, senator, mayor
- Terius Youngdell Nash, singer-songwriter and record producer
- Bucky Covington, country singer
- Dannell Ellerbe, NFL player
- Melvin Ingram, NFL player

== See also ==
- List of counties in North Carolina
- National Register of Historic Places listings in Richmond County, North Carolina

== Works cited ==
- Florence & Hutchinson, Inc. (December 2011), US-1 from Sandhill Road (SR-1971) to North of Fox Road (SR 1606), Richmond County: Environmental Impact Statement, North Carolina Department of Transportation
- Covington, Howard E. Jr; Ellis, Marion A. (1999). Terry Sanford: Politics, Progress, and Outrageous Ambitions. Durham: Duke University Press. ISBN 978-0-8223-2356-3.
- Marks, Stuart A. (2021). Southern Hunting in Black and White: Nature, History, and Ritual in a Carolina Community. Princeton University Press. ISBN 978-0-691-22686-6.
- Massengill, Stephen E.; Vallance, C. Vernon (2005). Richmond County and the Seaboard Air Line Railway. Arcadia Publishing. ISBN 978-0-7385-1754-4.
- McNair, Douglas B. (2015). "Breeding Distribution and Population Persistence of Loggerhead Shrikes in a Portion of the North Carolina Sandhills". Southeastern Naturalist. 14 (4): 757–770. doi:10.1656/058.014.0418. JSTOR 26454515. S2CID 87314787.
- Sharpe, Bill (October 1953). "Mountains, Piedmont, Sandhills". The State. Vol. 21, no. 21. pp. 3–5, 22–24.
- Sherman, Daniel J. (2012). Not Here, Not There, Not Anywhere: Politics, Social Movements, and the Disposal of Low-Level Radioactive Waste. Routledge. ISBN 978-1-136-52206-2.
- Simon, Bryant (2020). The Hamlet Fire: A Tragic Story of Cheap Food, Cheap Government, and Cheap Lives. Chapel Hill: The University of North Carolina Press. ISBN 978-1-4696-6137-7.
- Stewart, John Douglas; Stewart, Sara (2001). Scotland County. Arcadia Publishing. ISBN 978-0-7385-1358-4.
- Sykes, Wanda D. (May 2010), Richmond County Working Lands Protection Plan (PDF), North Carolina Department of Environmental Quality
