= Bob Nelson =

Bob Nelson may refer to:

- Bob Nelson (songwriter) (1934–2015), Hawaiian songwriter
- Chicago Bob Nelson (1944–2013), harmonica player, songwriter
- Bob Nelson (linebacker) (born 1953), retired American football linebacker; played for the Buffalo Bills, San Francisco 49ers, and Oakland/Los Angeles Raiders
- Bob Nelson (comedian) (born 1958), American stand-up comedian and actor
- Bob Nelson (screenwriter) (born 1956), American screenwriter
- Bob Nelson (defensive tackle) (born 1959), American football nose tackle; played for Tampa Bay Buccaneers & Green Bay Packers
- Bob Nelson (center) (1920–1986), American football center

== See also ==
- Robert Nelson (disambiguation)
- Bobby Nelson (disambiguation)
- Bert Nelson (disambiguation)
- Nelson (surname)
- Bob Neilson (1923–2014), New Zealand rugby player
