= Robert Melson =

Robert Melson may refer to:

- Robert Melson (political scientist)
- Robert Melson (murderer)

== See also ==
- Robert Nelson (disambiguation)
