= North Carolina Highway 159 =

State highway in Randolph County, North Carolina, US

North Carolina Highway 159
- Zoo Parkway

Route information
- Maintained by NCDOT
- Length: 7.3 mi (11.7 km)
- Existed: 1975–present

Major junctions
- South end: US 220 Alt. near Ulah
- North end: US 64 Bus. / NC 49 in Asheboro

Location
- Country: United States
- State: North Carolina
- Counties: Randolph

Highway system
- North Carolina Highway System; Interstate; US; State; Scenic
| ← US 158 | → NC 160 |

North Carolina Highway 159 (NC 159) is a primary state highway in the U.S. state of North Carolina. It serves as access to the North Carolina Zoological Park.

== Route description ==
NC 159 is a two-lane highway that connects nearby highways to the North Carolina Zoological Park.

== History ==
Established in 1975 as a new primary route, it went from the North Carolina Zoological Park to US 64/NC 49 in Asheboro. In 1977, its southern terminus was moved to connect to US 220, creating an NC 159 Spur to the park.

== Future ==
NC 159 Spur is planned to be extended west of its current terminus on mainline NC 159 to the US 64 By-Pass. Construction on the new US 64 By-Pass began in 2016 and was completed in 2020, with the spur extension to begin at a later date. The new connector will alleviate traffic for those going to-and-from the North Carolina Zoological Park.

== Junction list ==
The entire route is in Randolph County.

| Location | mi | km | Destinations | Notes |
|---|---|---|---|---|
| | 0.0 | 0.0 | US 220 Alt. to I-73 / I-74 – Seagrove, Rockingham, Charlotte, Greensboro | |
| | 2.9 | 4.7 | NC 159 Spur – North Carolina Zoological Park | |
| Asheboro | 7.3 | 11.7 | US 64 Bus. / NC 49 – Lexington, Charlotte, Ramseur, Siler City | |
1.000 mi = 1.609 km; 1.000 km = 0.621 mi

== Special routes ==
=== North Carolina Zoological Park spur route ===
North Carolina Highway 159 Spur
- Location: North Carolina Zoological Park
- Length: 0.7 mi (1,100 m)
- Existed: 1977–present

Established in 1979 when NC 159 was redirected south to US 220. Its purpose is to connect the North Carolina Zoological Park with mainline NC 159. Though not signed along its route, it is listed on state and county maps and is the only known spur route in North Carolina.

Junction list

The entire route is in Asheboro, Randolph County.

| mi | km | Destinations | Notes |
|---|---|---|---|
| 0.0 | 0.0 | NC 159 to I-73 / I-74 / US 64 / US 220 / NC 49 – Greensboro, Rockingham, Raleigh, Charlotte | |
| 0.7 | 1.1 | North Carolina Zoological Park | |
1.000 mi = 1.609 km; 1.000 km = 0.621 mi
