= Special routes of U.S. Route 220 =

Special routes of U.S. Route 220

Highway system
- United States Numbered Highway System; List; Special; Divided

Several special routes of U.S. Route 220 exist. In order from south to north they are as follows.

== North Carolina ==
=== Candor–Seagrove alternate route ===
U.S. Highway 220 Alternate
- Location: Candor–Seagrove, North Carolina
- Length: 27.5 mi (44.3 km)
- Existed: 1979–present

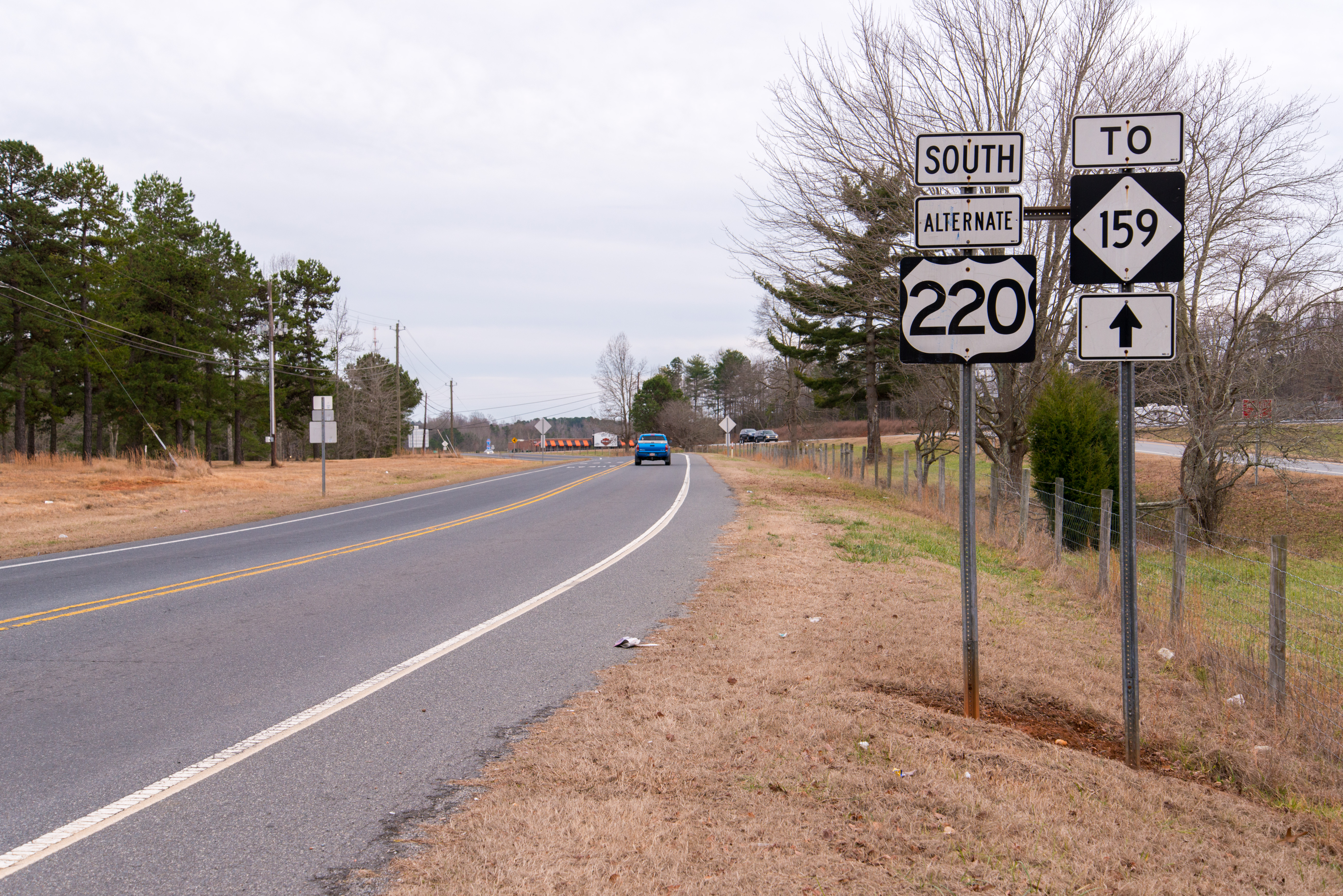
Southbound US 220 Alt to NC 159, near Ulah

U.S. Route 220 Alternate (US 220 Alt), established in 1979, is an 27.5-mile (44.3 km) route that follows the old US 220 route through Candor, Biscoe and Star. In 1997, it was extended further north through Seagrove to its current terminus near Ulah. In 2008, the US 220 Alt was temporary extended south 7.9-mile (12.7 km) to NC 73, while mainline US 220 was on new freeway filling in for Future I-73/I-74; In 2013, mainline US 220 was moved back on that section. Predominantly a two-lane rural highway, it begins at exit 41 interchange from I-73/I-74/US 220 and ends at US 220 Bus, just 200 feet (61 m) from exit 68.

Major intersections

| County | Location | mi | km | Destinations | Notes |
|---|---|---|---|---|---|
| Montgomery | Emery | 0.0 | 0.0 | I-73 / I-74 / US 220 – Rockingham, Asheboro | |
| Montgomery | Candor | 1.8 | 2.9 | NC 731 west – Norman | West end of NC 731 overlap |
| Montgomery | Candor | 23.1 | 37.2 | NC 211 east – Seven Lakes, Pinehurst | East end of NC 731 overlap |
| Montgomery | Biscoe | 8.2 | 13.2 | NC 24 / NC 27 (Main Street) – Carthage, Troy | |
| Montgomery | Star | 11.7 | 18.8 | Spies Road | |
| Montgomery | Ether | 14.9 | 24.0 | I-73 / I-74 / US 220 – Rockingham, Asheboro | |
| Montgomery | | 17.5 | 28.2 | Black Ankle Road | |
| Randolph | Seagrove | 21.2 | 34.1 | NC 705 (Main Street) – Robbins | |
| Randolph | | 25.6 | 41.2 | New Hope Church Road | |
| Randolph | | 26.5 | 42.6 | NC 159 north (Zoo Parkway) – North Carolina Zoological Park | |
| Randolph | | 27.5 | 44.3 | US 220 Bus. to I-73 / I-74 / US 220 – Ulah, Asheboro, Rockingham | |
1.000 mi = 1.609 km; 1.000 km = 0.621 mi: Concurrency terminus

=== Asheboro business loop ===
U.S. Highway 220 Business
- Location: Ulah–Level Cross, North Carolina
- Length: 20.2 mi (32.5 km)
- Existed: 1966–present

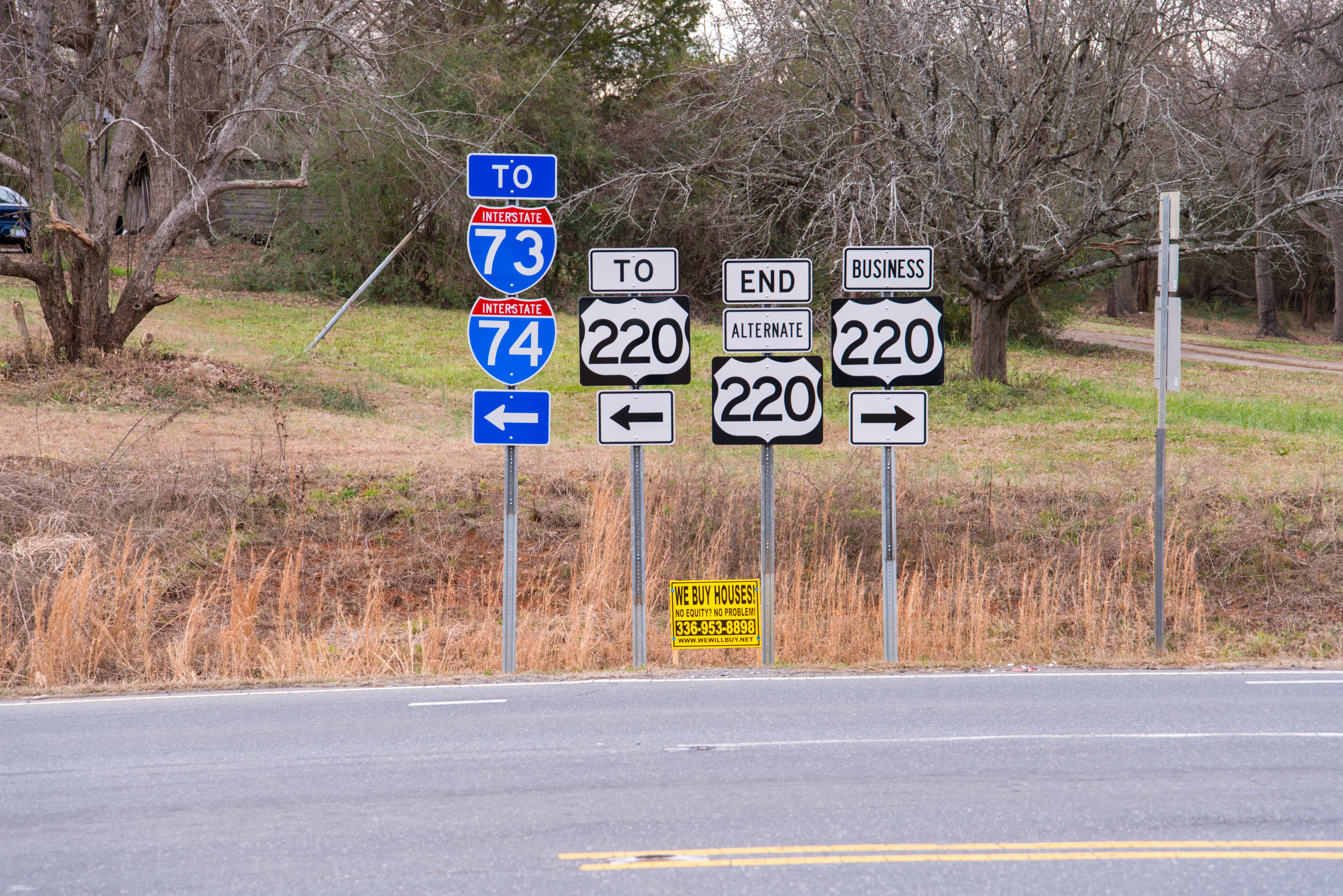
End of US 220 Alt at US 220 Bus, connecting to nearby I-73/I-74/US 220

U.S. Route 220 Business (US 220 Bus) was established in 1966 when mainline US 220 was rerouted onto new freeway bypass from south of Ulah to Vision Drive, in Asheboro. In 1972, US 220 Bus replaced some of the mainline along Vision Drive as new freeway was built further north towards US 311. In 1974, US 220 Bus was removed from Vision Drive and continued north along the old mainline route, through Randleman, to Level Cross. In 1982, US 220 Bus was adjusted at Level Cross, replacing some of the mainline to its current terminus with US 220 interchange. US 220 Bus is two-lane along its routing outside Asheboro and three to four-lane in Asheboro.

Major intersections

The entire route is in Randolph County.

| Location | mi | km | Destinations | Notes |
|---|---|---|---|---|
| | 0.0 | 0.0 | I-73 / I-74 / US 220 – Rockingham, Asheboro US 220 Alt. south to NC 159 – Seagrove To NC 134 south / Dawson Miller Road – Troy | US 220 Alt is 200 feet (61 m) north of interchange NC 134 is 600 feet (180 m) south of interchange |
| Asheboro | 3.5 | 5.6 | McDowell Road | |
| Asheboro | 4.8 | 7.7 | US 64 Alt. / NC 49 – Siler City, Lexington | East and westbound via connector roads |
| Asheboro | 6.2 | 10.0 | NC 42 (Salisbury Street) | |
| Asheboro | 6.7 | 10.8 | Presnell Street | |
| Asheboro | 8.2 | 13.2 | To I-73 / I-74 / US 220 / Vision Drive | |
| Asheboro | 9.4 | 15.1 | Spero Road | |
| Asheboro | 10.7 | 17.2 | Pineview Street | |
| Randleman | 12.5 | 20.1 | To I-73 / I-74 / US 220 / US Highway 311 Extension | |
| Randleman | 14.0 | 22.5 | Academy Street | |
| Level Cross | 20.2 | 32.5 | I-73 / US 220 – Greensboro, Asheboro | |
1.000 mi = 1.609 km; 1.000 km = 0.621 mi

=== Madison–Mayodan business loop ===
U.S. Highway 220 Business
- Location: Madison–Mayodan, North Carolina
- Length: 7.1 mi (11.4 km)
- Existed: 1963–present

== Virginia ==
=== Ridgeway business loop ===
U.S. Route 220 Business
- Location: Ridgeway, Virginia
- Length: 1.7 mi (2.7 km)

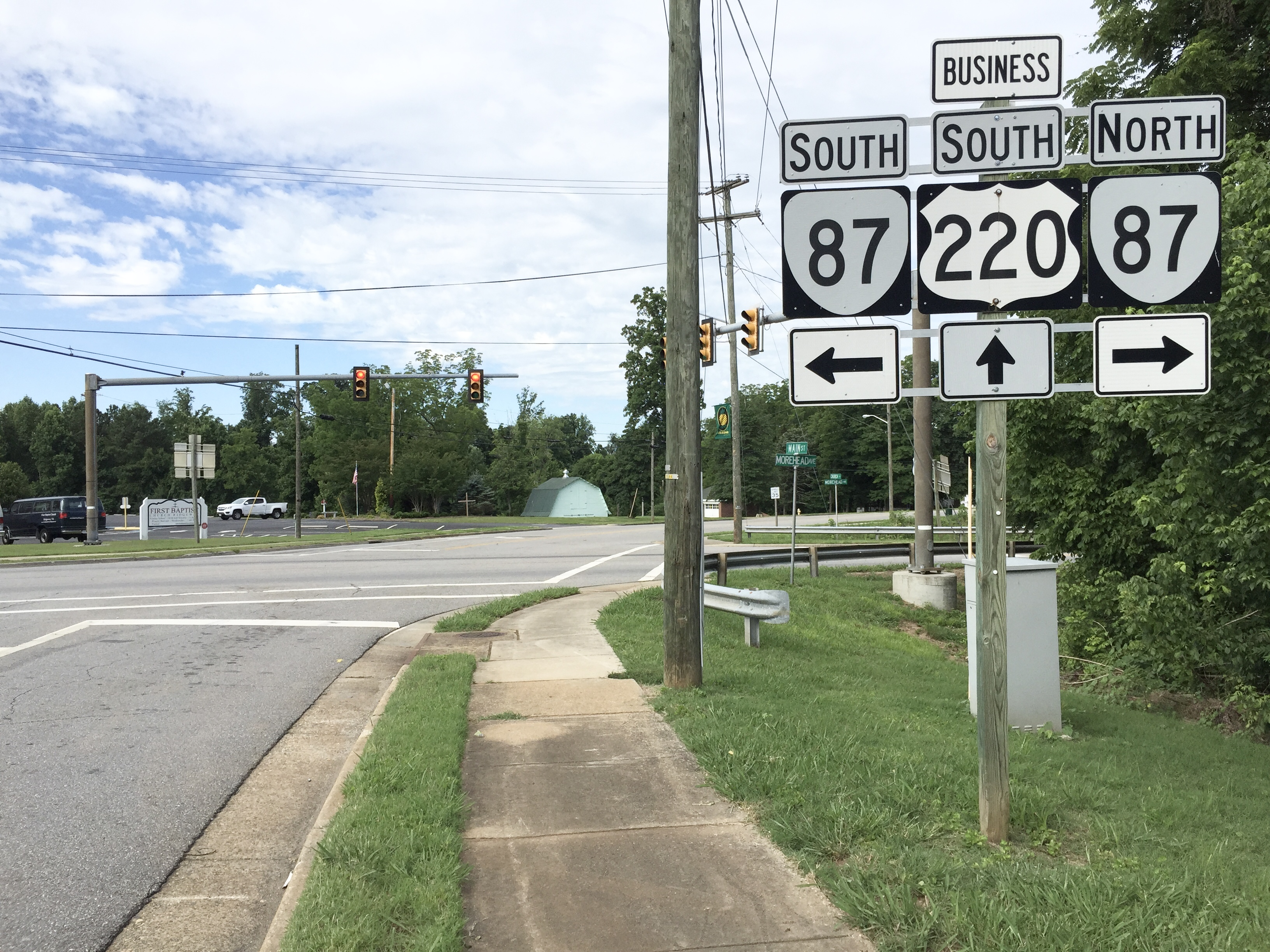
View south along US 220 Bus. at SR 87 in Ridgeway

U.S. Route 220 Business in Ridgeway, Henry County follows the old route of US 220 through downtown Ridgeway along Church Street and Main Street.

=== Martinsville business loop ===
U.S. Route 220 Business
- Location: Martinsville, Virginia
- Length: 10.5 mi (16.9 km)

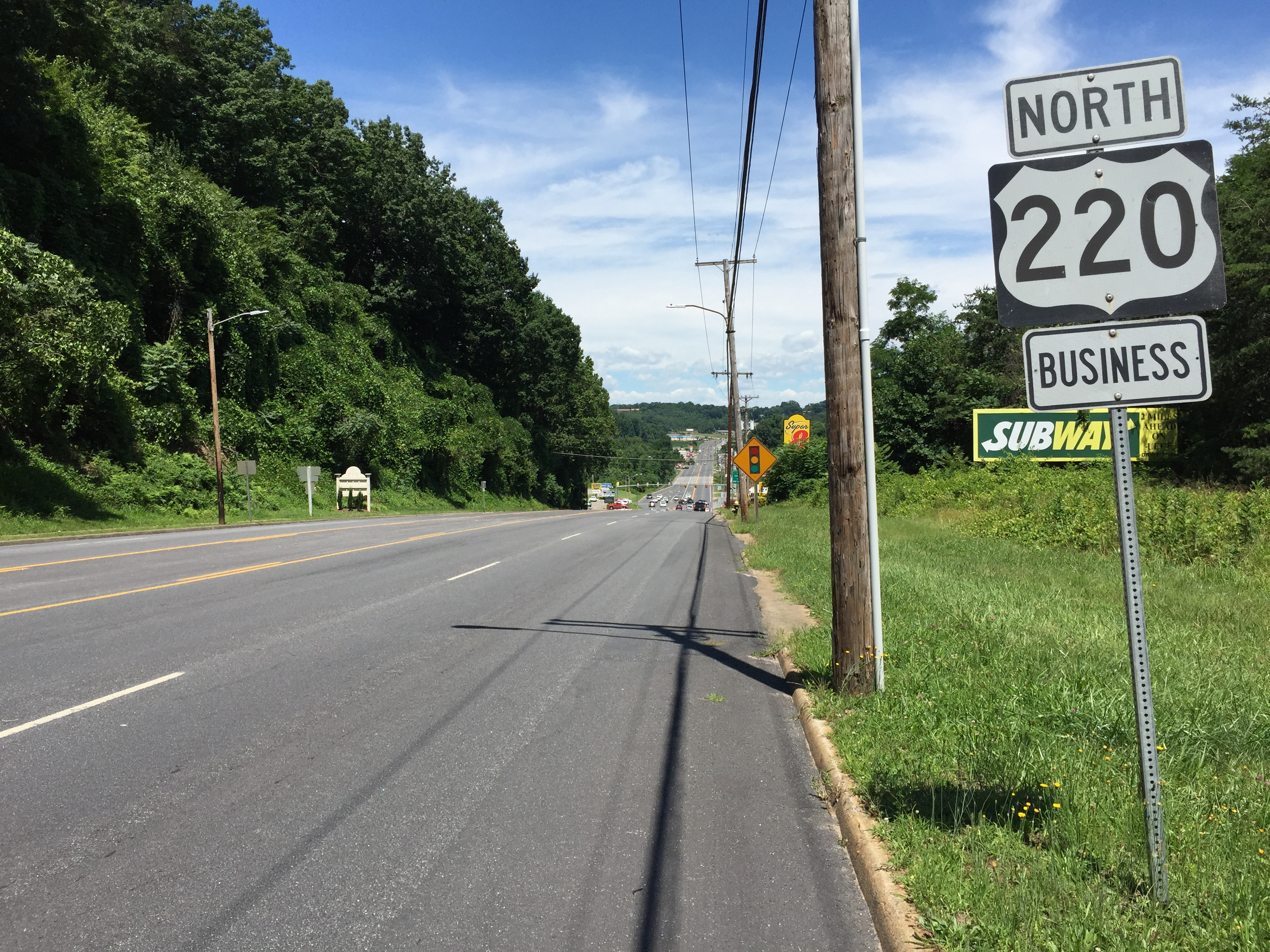
US 220 Bus. northbound in Martinsville

U.S. Route 220 Business (US 220 Bus) departs US 220 at the junction with US 58 south of Martinsville in Henry County. It heads north as Greensboro Road, following US 220's old alignment. North of its junction with US 58 Bus in Martinsville, it crosses the Smith River and becomes known as Memorial Boulevard, a name it retains even after separating from US 58 Bus and joining SR 57 at Starling Avenue. SR 57 separates from US 220 Bus at Fayette Street, with US 220 Bus continuing on Memorial Boulevard. After re-entering Henry County, US 220 Bus intersects Commonwealth Boulevard and changes its name to Virginia Avenue. It retains this name through Collinsville before rejoining mainline US 220. West of US 220, Virginia Avenue becomes known as Fairystone Park Highway, a portion of SR 57.

=== Rocky Mount business loop ===
U.S. Route 220 Business
- Location: Rocky Mount, Virginia
- Length: 5.4 mi (8.7 km)

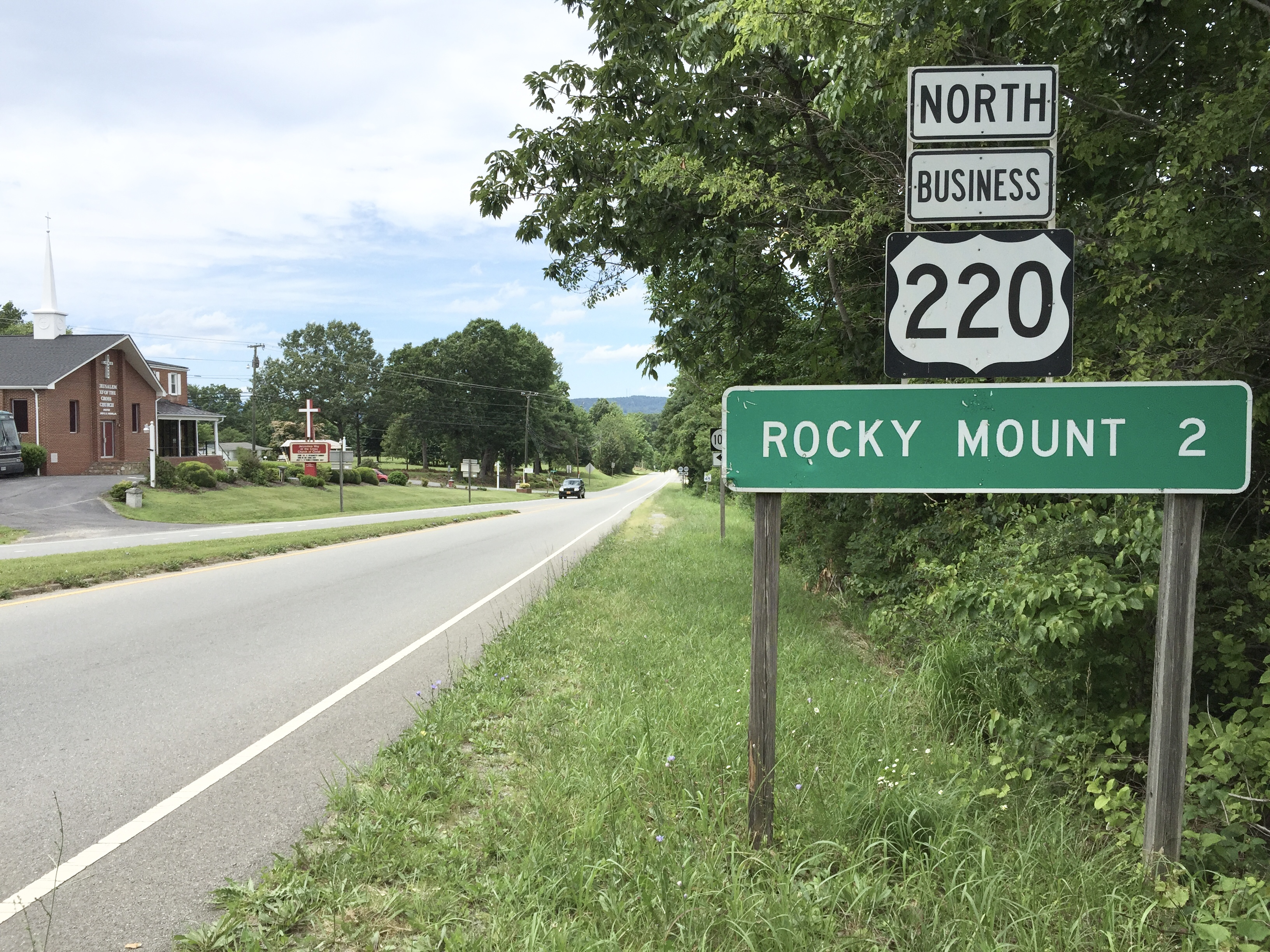
View north along US 220 Bus. in Henry Fork

U.S. Route 220 Business begins at an interchange two miles south of Rocky Mount as South Main Street. The street continues north through residential neighborhoods as it passes Franklin Memorial Hospital and the Franklin County Courthouse in downtown Rocky Mount. The route continues north as Main Street and intersects with Virginia State Route 40 (Franklin St and Pell Avenue). The street becomes North Main Street as it continues north through town. North Main St intersects with State Route 919 just before the final interchange with US 220.

=== Roanoke business loop ===
U.S. Route 220 Business
- Location: Roanoke, Virginia
- Length: 4.5 mi (7.2 km)

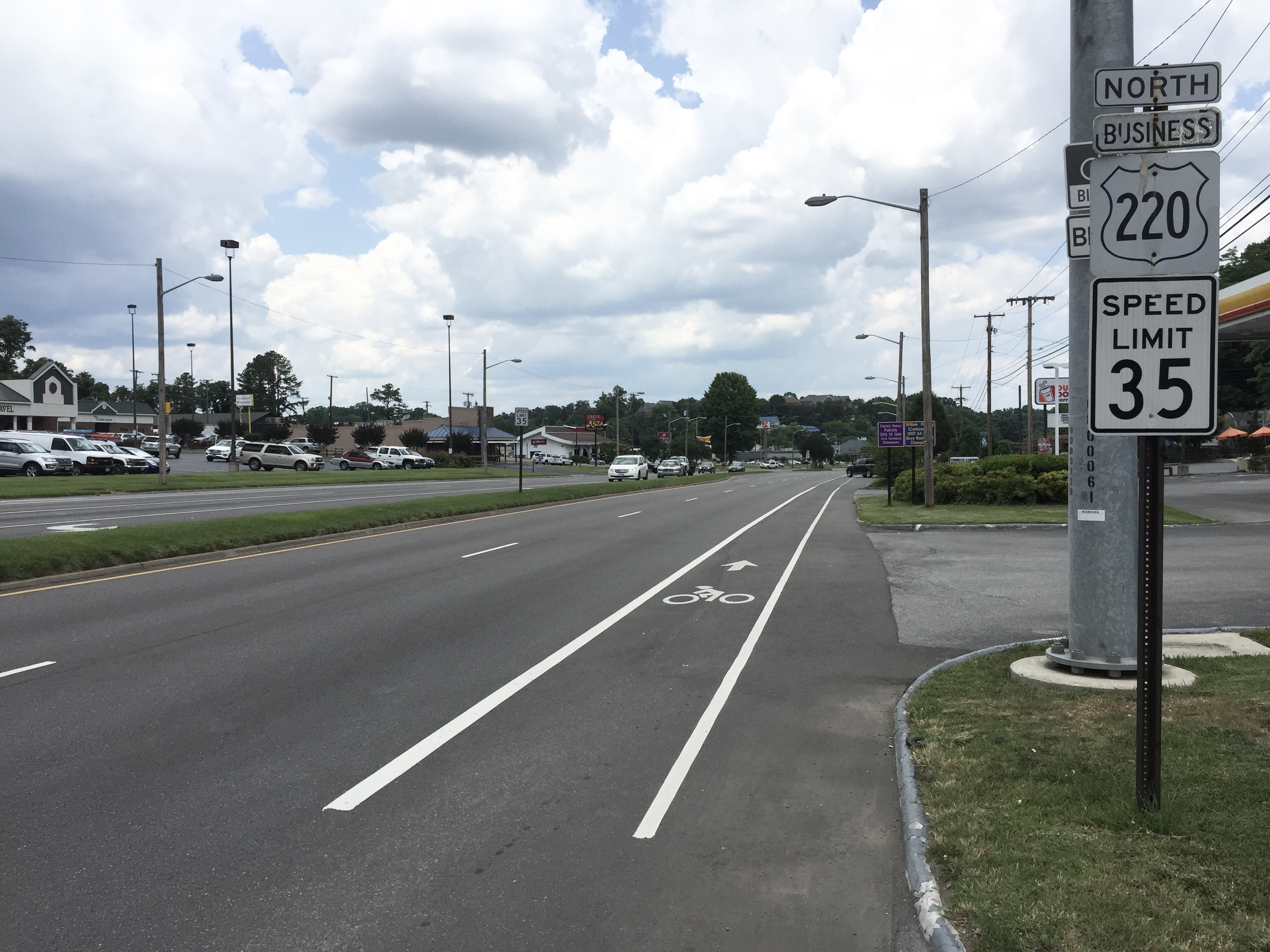
US 220 Bus. northbound in Roanoke

U.S. Route 220 Business begins at an interchange with US 220 in the southwest corner of Roanoke. From there, it runs north along Franklin Road to Williamson Road, then north along Williamson Road to Orange Avenue where it terminates at US 220 Alternate.

=== Roanoke alternate route ===
U.S. Route 220 Alternate
- Location: Roanoke, Virginia
- Length: 11.0 mi (17.7 km)

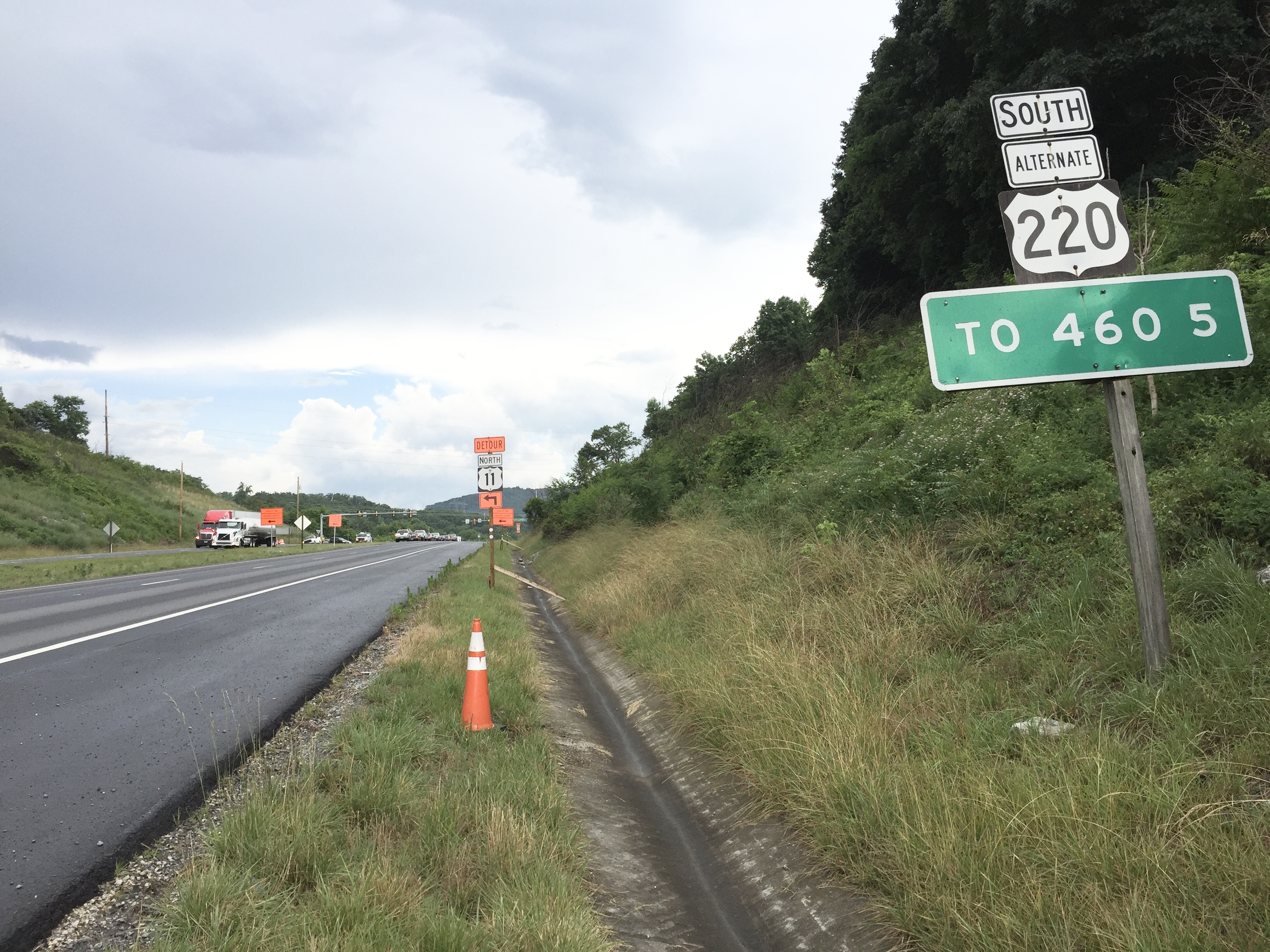
View south at the north end of US 220 Alt. at I-81, US 11, and US 220 in Botetourt County

U.S. Route 220 Alternate is a 11.0-mile (17.7 km) route that appeared in 1979 as a concurrency with US 460/US 221 from the junction of I-581/US 220 (Exit 7) in downtown Roanoke and then north on the route of former secondary State Route 604 from Bonsack in Roanoke County to just north of Cloverdale in Botetourt County. There, its terminus is at an interchange of I-81, US 220 and US 11 (Exit 150).

In the 1930s and 40s, the Bonsack to Cloverdale route was part of VA 114 until it was downgraded to SR 604 in April 1944. In the 1990s, the section from Bonsack to Cloverdale was widened to four lanes and it serves as a bypass for US 460 seeking to avoid Roanoke traffic congestion.

Previously, the Rocky Mount bypass was designated as US 220 Alternate from its construction in 1960-61 until it was changed to US 220 Bypass between 1968 and 1970.

=== Clifton Forge business loop ===
U.S. Route 220 Business
- Location: Clifton Forge, Virginia
- Length: 3.3 mi (5.3 km)

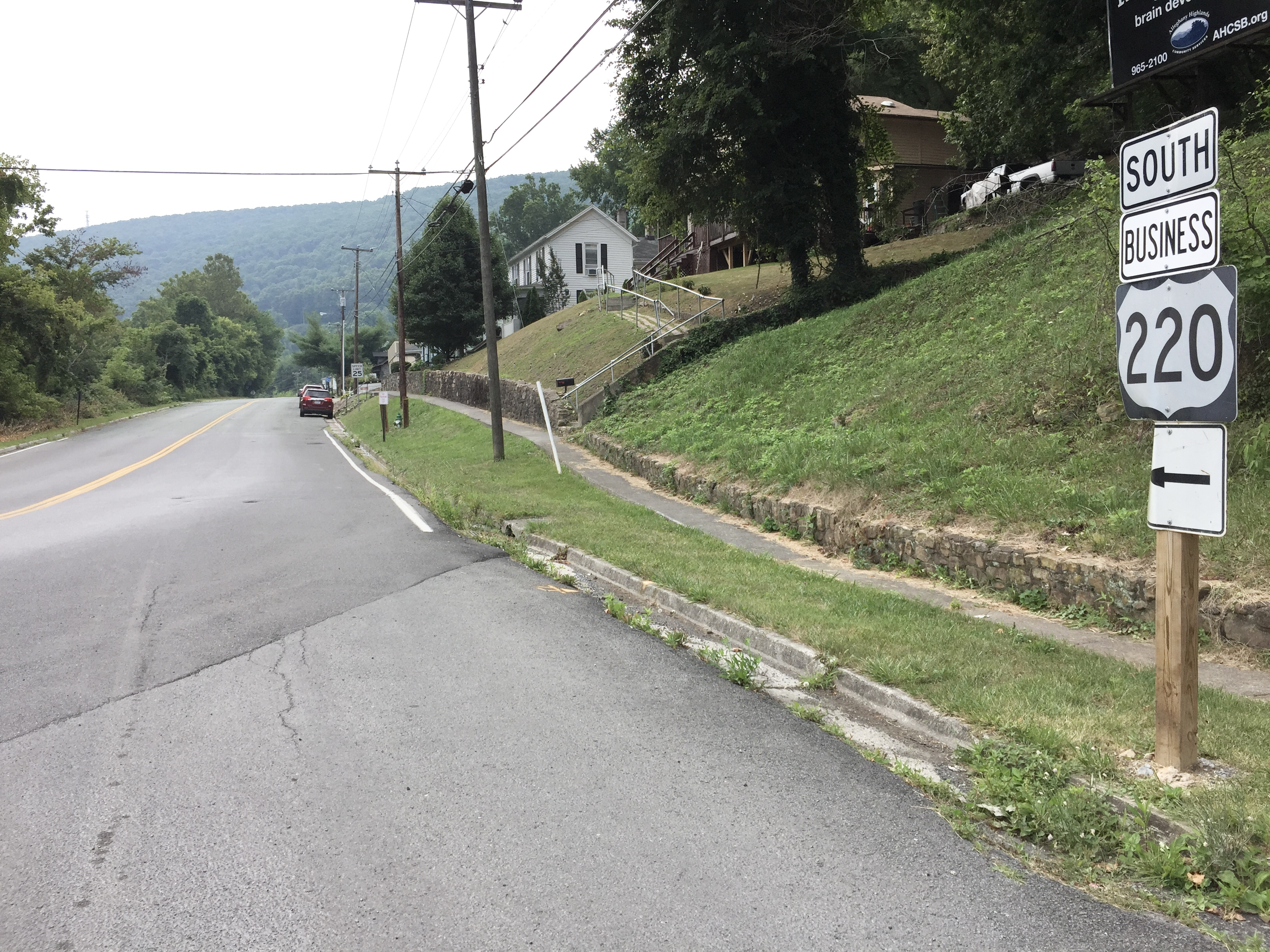
US 220 Bus. southbound in Clifton Forge

== Maryland ==
=== Maryland truck route ===
U.S. Route 220 Truck
- Location: La Vale – Cresaptown, Maryland
- Length: 3.26 mi (5.25 km)

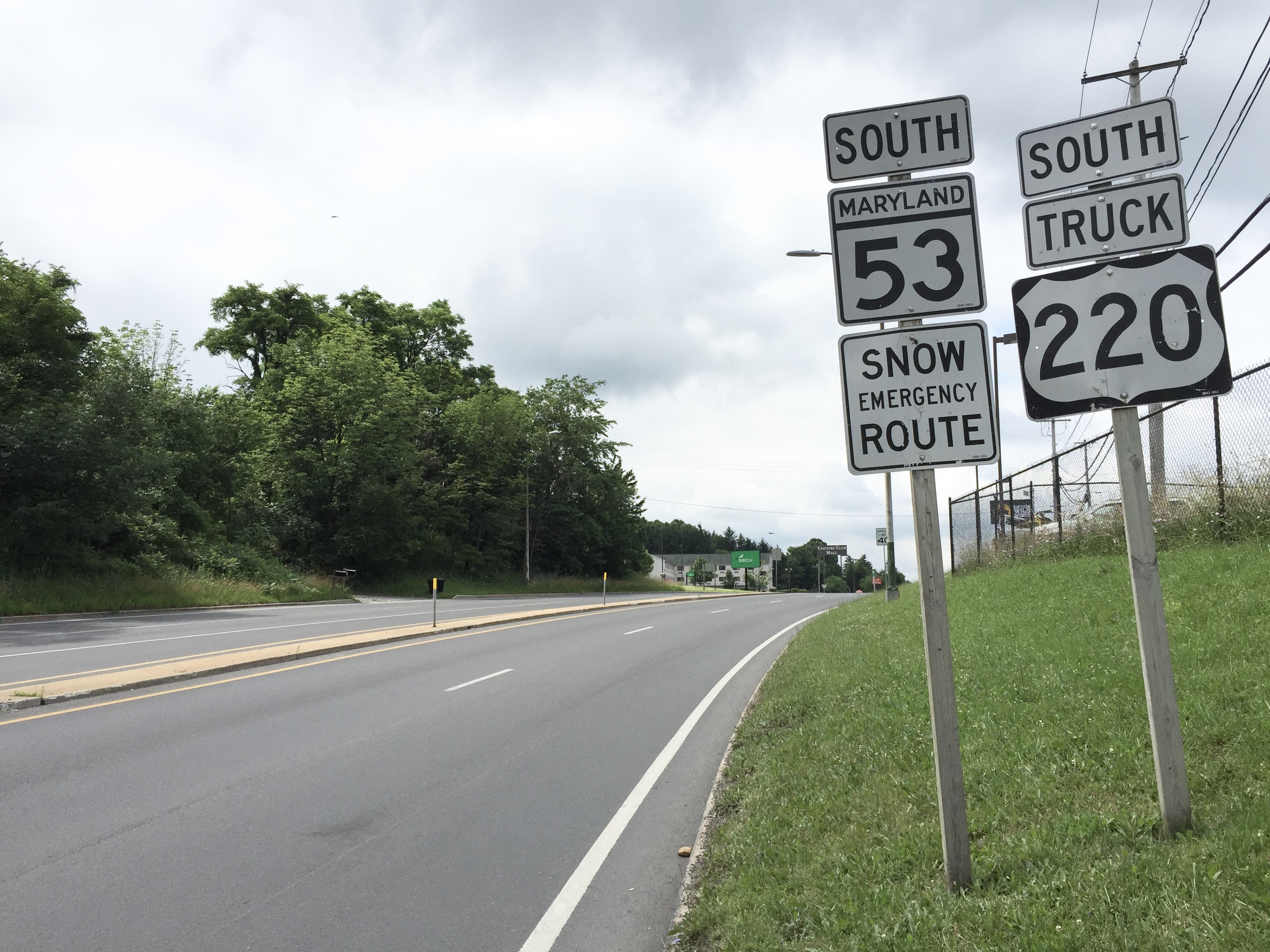
View south along MD 53 and US 220 Truck in La Vale

U.S. Route 220 Truck is a southbound-only truck route used to bypass the exit ramp from eastbound I-68 to southbound US 220 at Interchange 42, which carries a truck and bus prohibition due to the steep grade. The restricted traffic exits eastbound I-68 at Interchange 40 and follows US 220 Truck, which follows MD 658 (Vocke Road) and then MD 53 south to US 220 in Cresaptown.

== Pennsylvania ==
=== Bedford business route ===
U.S. Route 220 Business
- Location: Bedford, Pennsylvania
- Existed: 1973–present

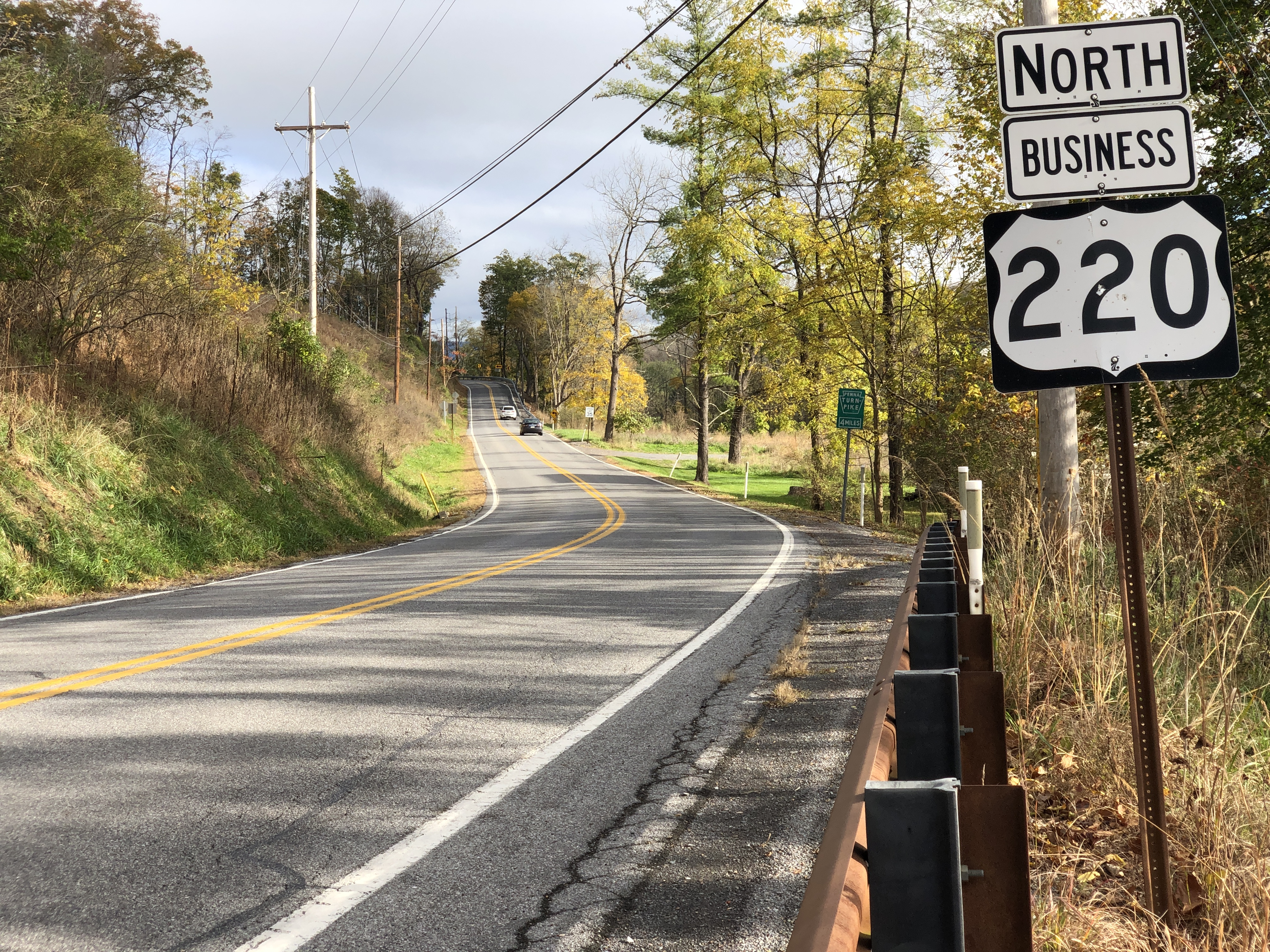
US 220 Bus. northbound south of Bedford

U.S. Route 220 Business is a 12-mile (19 km) route following the original alignment of its parent. In 1973, US 220 became a freeway between Bedford and Altoona, Pennsylvania, and the old tract of the route near Bedford became a business loop. Currently, US 220 has been partnered with Interstate 99; however, the freeway segment south of the Pennsylvania Turnpike is currently not yet part of the interstate system, which may or may not affect the future status of this road. South of the borough, the route winds over the hilly approach to the town at much steeper grades than does the freeway. It then reaches several stoplights as it serves as a north-south main street. After exiting the municipality, it briefly becomes four lanes as it accommodates a variety of travel services at the interchanges with the Turnpike and I-99. Travelling north, the route flattens out, before meeting US 220 at I-99 Exit 3.

=== Blair County business route ===
U.S. Route 220 Business
- Location: Blair County, Pennsylvania
- Existed: 1996–present

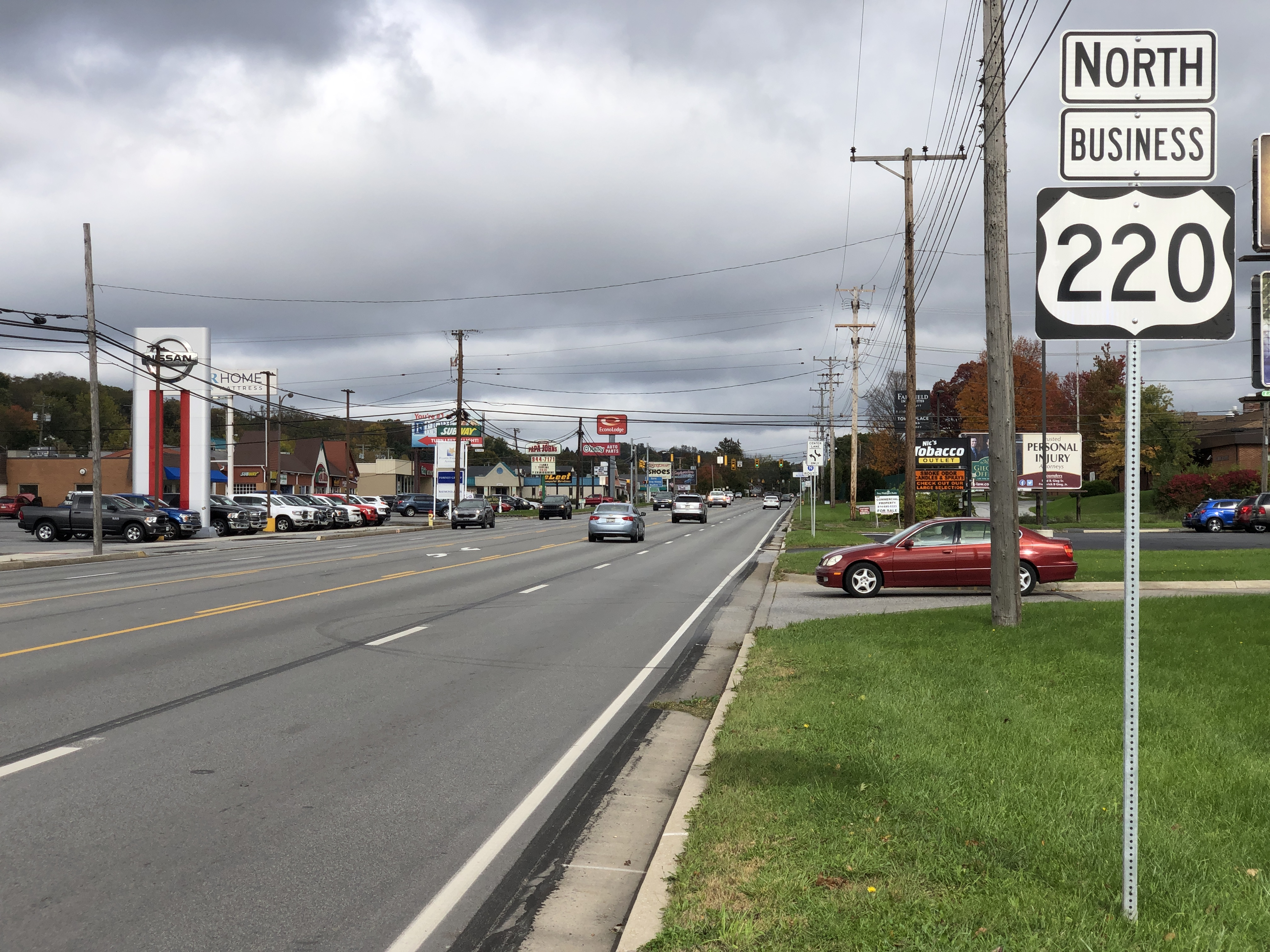
US 220 Bus. northbound in Altoona

U.S. Route 220 Business is a 37-mile (60 km) route following the original alignment of its parent. The route begins at Exit 15 of Interstate 99, in the southernmost point of Blair County, Pennsylvania. After travelling over a largely rural two-lane segment, it briefly becomes four lanes as it enters metropolitan Altoona; the highway then spends nearly a mile co-signed with two-lane U.S. Route 22. Afterward, it becomes Plank Road between Hollidaysburg and Altoona, feature four-lanes, a center turning lane, and a copious commercial development. Eventually the route becomes the more suburban Pleasant Valley Boulevard, splitting off into Valley View Boulevard between 23rd street and 2nd street with Pleasant Valley and Valley View being one-way roads, before they rejoin again into Pleasant Valley again, and it transitions to a two-laner before leaving the urban area. A cosign with Pennsylvania Route 764 occurs, as the route travels toward Tyrone, through which it serves as a narrow main street. After heading through several more small towns, the route rejoins I-99 at Exit 52.

=== Centre County alternate route ===
U.S. Route 220 Alternate
- Location: Centre County, Pennsylvania
- Existed: 2002–present

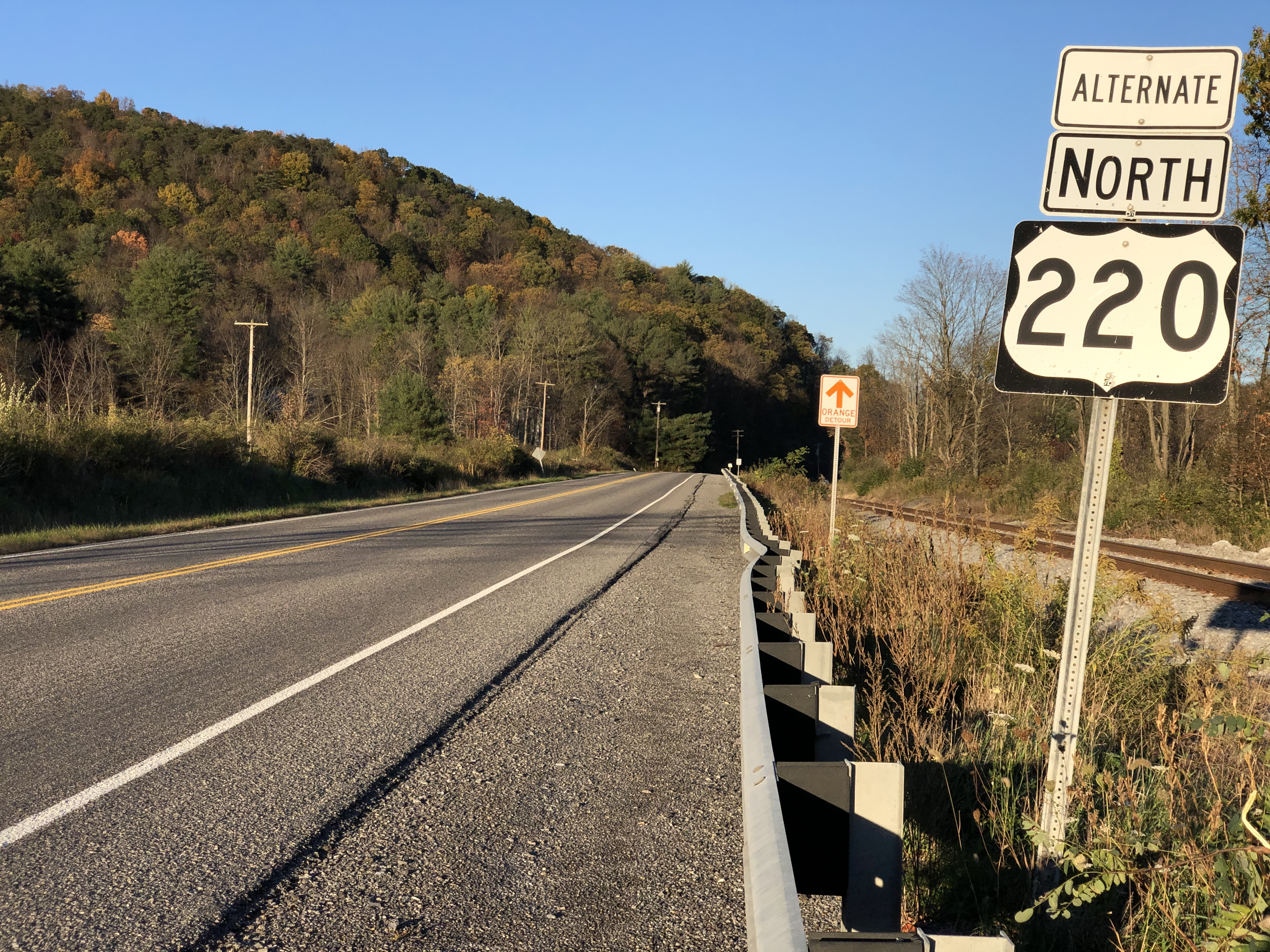
US 220 Alt. northbound in Huston Township

U.S. Route 220 Alternate is a 22-mile (35 km) route following the original alignment of its parent. As part of the ongoing completion of Interstate 99, U.S. 220 was shifted on to the Mount Nittany Expressway around State College, Pennsylvania. This portion received an alternate instead of a business designation because it deviates from the route's current course. The route begins in Huston Township, and is multiplexed consecutively with Pennsylvania Route 504, Pennsylvania Route 144, Pennsylvania Route 150, and Interstate 80 in its final 6 miles (9.7 km).

=== Williamsport truck route ===
U.S. Route 220 Truck
- Location: Williamsport, Pennsylvania
- Existed: 2013–present

U.S. Route 220 Truck is a truck route established to help trucks from US 220 south access US 220 north and trucks from US 220 north access US 220 south. The route was signed in 2013 and is located in Williamsport, Pennsylvania.

== Former ==
=== Ellerbe business loop ===
U.S. Highway 220 Business
- Location: Ellerbe, North Carolina
- Length: 8.1 mi (13.0 km)
- Existed: 2008–2013

U.S. Route 220 Business (US 220 Bus) was established in 2008 as a temporary route, while mainline US 220 was on new freeway filling in for Future I-73/I-74. At or near NC 73, it would continue north as US 220 Alt. In 2013, mainline US 220 was moved back onto its original route through Ellerbe, deleting the business loop.

=== Rocky Mount alternate route ===
U.S. Route 220 Alternate
- Location: Rocky Mount, Virginia
- Existed: 1959–1970

Established around 1959-1961 as new construction bypassing Rocky Mount. By 1970, it was converted into mainline US 220.

== See also ==
- List of special routes of the United States Numbered Highway System
