= Albert Nelson =

Albert Nelson may refer to:

- Albert Nelson (actor), American actor
- Albert Nelson (sculptor) (1949–2021), American sculptor, brother of Martha Nelson Thomas
- Albert Nelson, 6th Earl Nelson (1890–1957), British peer
- Albert H. Nelson (1812–1858), American jurist and politician
- Al Nelson (born 1943), American football cornerback
- Albert Nelson, designer of The Nelsonian
- Albert Nelson (1923–1992), known by his stage name Albert King
- Red Nelson (baseball) (Albert Francis Nelson, 1886–1956), pitcher in Major League Baseball

== See also ==
- Alberta Nelson (1937–2006), American television and film actress
- Bert Nelson (disambiguation)
