= Bobby Nelson (disambiguation) =

Bobby Nelson may refer to

- Bobby Nelson (1917–2002), former professional wrestler and businessman
- Bobbie Nelson (1931–2022), country and jazz pianist, sister of Willie Nelson
- Bobby Nelson Poe (1933–2011), rockabilly musician
- Officer Bobby "Hot Dog" Nelson, a fictional police officer on CHiPs portrayed by actor Tom Reilly
- Bobby Nelson, former mayor of Huntington, West Virginia
- Bobby Nelson, an actor who appeared in Hollywood western films including Roaring Ranch, The Red Rope, and Partners (1932 film)

== See also ==
- Bob Nelson (disambiguation)
- Robert Nelson (disambiguation)
- Nelson (surname)
