= Hubert Nelson =

Hubert Nelson may refer to:

- Hub Nelson (1907–1981), ice hockey player
- Hubert Nelson of Nelstone's Hawaiians, who originally recorded Just Because (Nelstone's Hawaiians song)

== See also ==
- Bert Nelson (disambiguation)
