= Bert Nelson =

Bert or Herbert Nelson may refer to:

- Bert Nelson, character in Darkened Rooms
- Bert Nelson, co-star on Alan Watts on Living
- Bert Nelson (publisher) (1921–1994), co-founder of Track & Field News
- Bert Nelson, radio host on Call For Music
- Herbert Nelson, actor in The Bold Ones: The Lawyers

== See also ==
- Albert Nelson (disambiguation)
- Robert Nelson (disambiguation)
- Hubert Nelson (disambiguation)
