= Rob Nelson (biologist) =

American biologist

- Born: Robert Nelson; 13 August 1979 (age 47); Denver, Colorado, United States
- Education: University of Miami, University of Hawaiʻi at Mānoa, Montana State University
- Occupations: Biologist, documentary filmmaker, television personality
- Spouse: Haley Chamberlain (m. 2010)
- Children: 2

Robert "Rob" Nelson (born August 13, 1979, in Denver, Colorado) is an American biologist, documentary filmmaker, television personality and YouTuber.

He is a regular contributor to the Science Channel documentary series What on Earth? Starting in 2017, he was the host and participating researcher of the Science Channel documentary series Secrets of the Underground, whose goal was to examine long-held legendary mysteries that lie beneath the surfaces of streets, buildings, earth, salt and fresh water, etc. Nelson also cohosted the popular hit Animal Planet show, Life After Chernobyl in 2015.

He holds a B.S. in biology and marine science from the University of Miami, a M.S. degree in behavioral ecology from the University of Hawaiʻi at Mānoa, and a M.F.A. from the Montana State University. His work focused on finding ways to create the most effective science films.

He received an Emmy Award in 2014 for his work on Mysteries of the Driftless, a documentary film about the Driftless Area. He later filmed a second feature of the Mysteries of the Driftless in 2018 called Decoding the Driftless, which won another Emmy Award, and won "Best Picture" at the Los Angeles Film Festival in 2019.

Nelson's current work includes being the director of Untamed Science, a science documentary production company. He also hosts three YouTube channels, the most famous of which is the StoneAgeMan channel. His show works to help humans understand their relationship with the natural world. Rob works closely with the North Carolina Zoo to help tell animal stories.
