= What on Earth? (American TV program) =

- Country of origin: United States
- Original language: English
- No. of seasons: 12
- No. of episodes: 130

Original release
- Network: Science Channel
- Release: February 10, 2015 – March 16, 2023

What on Earth? is an American television program broadcast on Science Channel. It examines notable satellite imagery and explains or speculates on the strange phenomena visible. The program debuted in February 2015. It was Science Channel's most-watched program and was renewed for a third season in 2016 and a fourth season in 2017.

The series features Karen Bellinger, Brittany Brand, Mike Capps, Devin Dennie, Andrew Gough, Steven Kearney, Alan Lester, Jim Marrs, Rob Nelson, and Nick Pope.

In 2023, WOE returned for the twelfth season of episodes (1–10; January 12, 2023 through March 16, 2023).
