= Robert Nelson =

Robert or Rob Nelson may refer to:

== Entertainment ==
- Robert Nelson (filmmaker) (1930–2012), American experimental filmmaker
- Robert Lyn Nelson (born 1955), American artist
- Rob Nelson (talk show host) (born 1964), American talk show host and filmmaker
- Rob Nelson (biologist) (born 1979), American biologist, documentary filmmaker and television personality

== Religion ==
- Robert Nelson (nonjuror) (1656–1715), English religious writer
- Robert Nelson (bishop) (1913–1959), British bishop of Middleton, 1958–1958
- J. Robert Nelson (1920–2004), American Methodist theologian

== Sports ==
- Robert Neilson (1878–1946), Scotland international rugby union player
- Robert Nelson (cricketer, born 1912) (1912–1940), English cricketer
- Bob Neilson (1923–2014), New Zealand rugby league player
- Tex Nelson (Robert Sidney Nelson, 1936–2011), American baseball player
- Rob Nelson (baseball) (born 1964), American baseball first baseman
- Robert Nelson (cricketer, born 1970) (born 1970), English cricketer
- Robert Nelson (defensive back) (born 1990), American football player
- Robert Nelson (American football, born 1920) (1920–1985), American football player

== Other ==
- Robert Nelson (insurrectionist) (1794–1873), physician and leading figure in the Lower Canada Rebellion
- Robert Henry Nelson (1853–1892), British Army officer and African explorer
- Robert Nelson (British politician) (1888–1932), British member of parliament for Motherwell, 1918–1922
- Robert Nelson (entomologist) (1903–1996), American entomologist and agricultural researcher
- Robert T. Nelson (1936–2023), vice admiral in the United States Coast Guard
- Robert Nelson (economist) (1944–2018), professor of environmental policy
- Rob Nelson (reporter) (born 1978), American news reporter

== See also ==
- Robert Nielsen (1922–2009), Canadian journalist
- Bob Nelson (disambiguation)
- Bobby Nelson (disambiguation)
- Bert Nelson (disambiguation)
- Nelson (surname)
