= Call for Music (Canadian TV program) =

Canadian music variety television series

- Genre: Variety
- Presented by: Bert Nelson
- Country of origin: Canada
- Original language: English
- No. of seasons: 1

Production
- Running time: 30 minutes

Original release
- Network: CBC Television
- Release: 12 November 1957 – 4 February 1958

Call for Music is a Canadian music variety television programme that aired on CBC Television from 1957 to 1958.

== Premise ==
Bert Nelson hosted this Vancouver-produced variety series. Guests included Pat Suzuki who appeared on two episodes. The house orchestra was led by Ricky Hyslop.

== Scheduling ==
This half-hour series was broadcast on alternate Tuesdays at 10:00 p.m. (Eastern) from 12 November 1957 to 4 February 1958. The Concert Hour was broadcast on other weeks.
