= Bob Nelson (songwriter) =

Robert Edward Lin Nelson (November 26, 1934 – May 8, 2015) was a Hawaiian songwriter, composer, pianist, and singer. He is best known for his most popular songs, "Hanalei Moon" and "Maui Waltz". He was also a staunch defender of the copyrights and royalties of Hawaiian songwriters and composers, and served on advisory boards at ASCAP for two decades. In 2013 he received the Lifetime Achievement Award from the Hawaii Academy of Recording Arts.

== Career ==
=== Songwriting and performing ===
Nelson was born in 1934 in Wailuku, Maui. For his musical career he moved to Oahu, where he wrote songs and performed. He was interviewed as a songwriter by the Honolulu Advertiser in 1969. He played the piano bar at the Yacht Harbor Towers in Honolulu from 1976 to 1988.

In the 1970s and 1980s, Nelson wrote several popular songs, such as "Hanalei Moon" (1974), "Maui Waltz" (1975), and "Just a Little Girl". In 1976 "Hanalei Moon" received the award for Best New Song at the first Nani Awards, the predecessor to the Na Hoku Hanohano Awards. In 1978 he was nominated for Best Composer, and his song "Maui Waltz" was nominated for Best Song, at the very first Na Hoku Hanohano Awards. In 1978 "Hanalei Moon" and "Maui Waltz" were among the top 15 most-popular songs in Hawaii.

In 1980, he released an album of 13 of his songs titled Bob Nelson & Friends. His album Bob Nelson Live at the Piano won the 1986 Na Hoku Hanohano award for Instrumental Album of the Year.

He was interviewed at length in the late 1970s by Ron Jacobs on Hawaii Public Radio station KKUA, and the tape of the interview was donated in 1979 to the Hawaiian Music Preservation Hall and Academy.

In 2013 Nelson received the Lifetime Achievement Award from the Hawaii Academy of Recording Arts.

=== Songwriters' advocacy ===
Throughout his career Nelson was a staunch advocate for Hawaiian songwriters' and composers' copyrights and royalties, writing articles and giving workshops on how to register and protect copyrights and safeguard royalties.

Nelson was the President of the Hawaii Composers Organization beginning in 1975, and spearheaded the Hawaiian Professional Songwriters Society beginning in the late 1970s.

In 1977 he was selected as ASCAP's resident representative in Hawaii, and he remained on ASCAP advisory boards for 17 years.

== Personal life ==
Nelson married Carolyn Sue Sanders, a local model and singer in the islands. They went on to have 3 children together. Tala, the eldest, Skya, and Derra. Carolyn changed her name for entertainment purposes to SuSu Nelson, and kept this name even after their divorce and up until her death in 2011. Tala married in 1999 and went on to have 5 boys and living most her life in Louisiana. Skya did not have any children and he and his wife live in Tucson. Derra has 1 daughter and is married, living in Colorado since 1996.

Nelson and SuSu finalized their divorce sometime in 1981. Nelson married his long-time love Irene, which they left Hawai'i and relocated to the mainland. In 1998 Nelson and his wife Irene moved to Scottsdale, Arizona. He continued to occasionally perform, mainly at private engagements.

Nelson moved back to Honolulu late in life to finish out his final years. Performing every Wednesday night at the Honolulu Elks Club. Nelson died on May 5, 2015, on O'ahu surrounded by loved ones after his battle with Leukemia.
