= The Nelsonian =

The Nelsonian is a 32-piece One-Man Band contraption, that Albert Nelson (1884-1964) designed, built and played. Nelson began building the device in 1915, because the Cello player in his band would often fail to show up. This led him to invent a device, that would allow him to play the Violin and Cello at the same time. His work on the machine concluded in 1957, when he added the 32nd and final instrument. The Nelsonian was a featured exhibit at Ripley's Believe it Or Not Odditorium during the 1933 World Fair in Chicago, Illinois.

== Albert Nelson ==
Albert Nelson was born November 14, 1884. He grew up in Sacred Heart, Minnesota, the youngest of fourteen children. As a child, Albert was interested in music. He could play violin by the age of seven. By age fourteen he could play fourteen different instruments.

As an adult, Albert learned photography from his brother and started his own studio in Wheaton, Minnesota. Albert married Jennie Erickson of Evansville, Minnesota on May 29, 1912, when Albert was 28 years old and they ran the photography studio together. Albert worked more and more away from home working on putting more instruments into his band that Jennie and Albert separated.

Albert left and moved to Buffalo, Minnesota and started another photography studio. He still experimented with his instruments and started performing at lodges, resorts and fairs. A couple years later he married Ida Nelson. On October 27, 1925, Albert's parents' house burned down, and on December 3, his mother died.

In February 1962 Ida died. Albert was almost 80 years old he was four months and ten days away when he died. There was a memorial service held for albert in Tampa, Florida on Sunday July 5, 1964 prior to his funeral in Buffalo, Minnesota a fitting eulogy was read for him.

== Nelsonian history ==
The Nelsonian is on permanent display in the Wright County Historical Society, located at Buffalo, Minnesota. The truck which Nelson used to transport the device, has recently been restored by the museum staff.

Gary Hukriede, grand-nephew of Albert Nelson, has published a 138-page book titled, "The Mighty Nelsonian: The story of Albert Nelson and his 32-piece One-Man-Band". Hukriede has also compiled a 2-disc CD of original Nelsonian recordings.

The Nelsonian traveled to the 1933 World's Fair in Chicago. The fair attracted more than 27 million people. At the World's Fair, the Nelsonian was a feature of Ripley's Believe It or Not “Odditorium.” According to his five-month contract, Albert played the Nelsonian every hour the fair was open to the public and received $40 per week.

In April 1936 Albert Nelson received a personal invitation letter from Jay Gould to join his Million Dollar Circus. He called it the Million Dollar circus because he said his kids were worth more than a million dollars. The circus traveled the Midwest and made stops in Minnesota, Iowa, North Dakota, South Dakota, Missouri, Illinois, Wisconsin and occasionally Nebraska and Indiana.

Maynard Howe remembered the Nelsonian “ Was mounted on a truck, which served as a big stage at one end of the tent, which was set up over and around it. The walls on the sides and back of the truck, which protected the instruments from weather when moving it from place to place, were removable, and when taken down apposed to spectators three size of the Nelsonian. Inside the tent there were no seats. A person buying a ticket can remain as long as they desired and could walk around and watch...and operator and the many moving parts create music.”

After the Nelsons moved to Florida in 1949, the Nelsonian continued to tour during the summer months. Albert spent the winter cleaning the instrument and making improvements. Albert continued performing on the road with the Nelsonian until 1959. Ida died in February 1962; Albert lost interest in the Nelsonian. Albert died July 4, 1964.

== The Machine ==
=== List of instruments ===
The Nelsonian's 32 Instruments include:

- 2 guitars
- 1 Mandolin
- 2 trumpets
- 1 Double bass
- 1 Trombone
- 1 Violin
- 1 Xylophone
- 1 Cello
- 1 Banjo
- 1 set of drums (bass drum, crash cymbal, snare drum, tom-tom drum, hi-hat)

== Sources ==
- WCHS
- Nelsonian, The (32-piece one-man band) - Buffalo, MN - U.S. National Register of Historic Places on Waymarking.com
- Program
- Albert Nelson: Founder, Inventor, and Performer on the "Nelsonian" One Man Band
- The Mighty Nelsonian: The Story of Albert Nelson and His 32-Piece One-Man-Band
