= North Carolina Zoo =

Zoo in Asheboro, North Carolina, United States

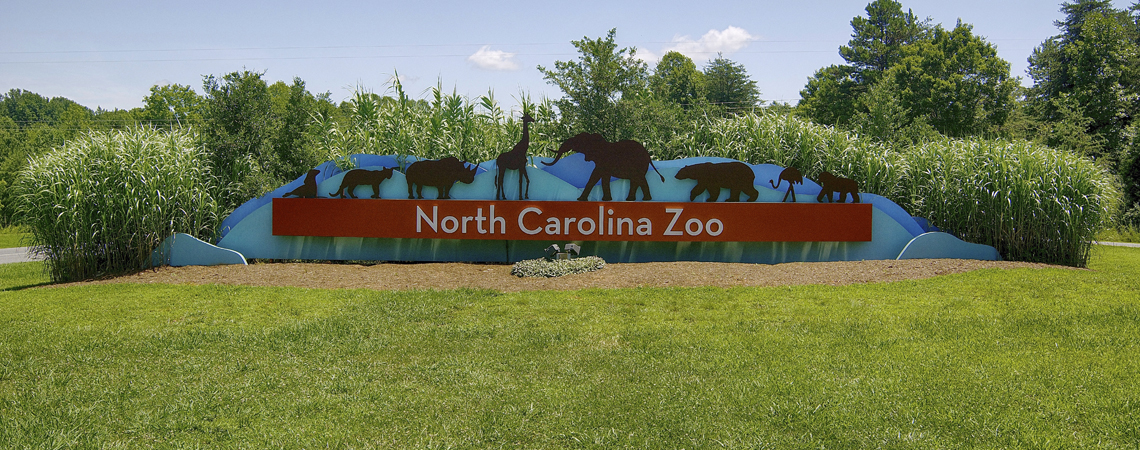
- Main Entrance Sign
- Interactive map of North Carolina Zoo
- 35.6295°N 79.7645°W
- Date opened: August 13, 1974
- Location: Asheboro, North Carolina, United States
- Land area: 2,600 acres (1,100 ha) total 500 acres (200 ha) developed
- No. of animals: 1,800+
- No. of species: 250
- Annual visitors: 1+ million
- Memberships: Association of Zoos and Aquariums, NC Zoo Society
- Major exhibits: Rocky Coast, Kitera Forest, Forest Glade, Desert, Watani Grasslands Reserve, Northwoods, Streamside, Cypress Swamp
- Website: https://www.nczoo.org

The North Carolina Zoo, formerly the North Carolina Zoological Park, is a zoo in Asheboro, North Carolina, housing 1,700 animals of more than 250 species, primarily representing Africa and North America. It is one of two state-supported zoos in the United States, with the other being the Minnesota Zoo. With 500 acres (2.0 km^{2}) developed, it is the world's largest natural habitat zoo. The North Carolina Zoo is a part of the North Carolina Department of Natural and Cultural Resources.

The Zoo is 75 miles (121 km) west of Raleigh, 25 miles (40 km) south of Greensboro, and 75 miles (121 km) northeast of Charlotte. It is within an hour's drive of the three major metropolitan areas along the I-85 Corridor. state's The zoo is open 363 days a year (closed on Thanksgiving and Christmas) and in 2023 received over one million visitors for the first time. The North Carolina Zoo is accredited by the Association of Zoos and Aquariums.

== History ==
In 1967, the North Carolina legislature created the NC Zoological Garden Study Commission to examine the feasibility of a state zoo. The nine-member commission found that a zoo was both feasible and desirable. Following next year, the North Carolina Zoological Society was formed with the goal of raising funds and public support for the zoo project. The same year, the legislature created the NC Zoological Authority to oversee the project. The site in Randolph County was selected from 6 sites after a 2-year search by the zoo commission, led by State Representative Archie McMillan of Wake County. After the selection of the site, its 1,371 acres (5.55 km^{2}) were donated to the state. A $2-million bond was passed and Governor Robert W. Scott dedicated the site in the spring of 1972. Construction of the North Carolina Zoo began in 1974 with the official opening date of August 13, 1976. The first animals, two Galapagos tortoises arrived in 1973 and an Interim Zoo was opened in 1974.

Ground was first broken for the Africa region in the spring of 1976, and the grand opening of the original five habitats took place in the summer of 1980. Today, it is home to a multitude of habitats, including chimpanzees, giraffes, gorillas, zebras, and elephants.

In 1980, Ham, a chimpanzee who became the first hominid in outer space, was moved to the North Carolina Zoo from the National Zoo in Washington, D.C. He lived there until his death three years later from a heart attack.

The Zoo has continued to expand ever since. Throughout the 1980s, the habitats of the African region opened. Additionally, the Zoo in 1984 received accreditation from the Association of Zoos and Aquariums (AZA). In 1993, the first of the North America habitats was completed, home to the animals and habitats of the Sonora Desert. The final North American region opened in 1996.

The Connect NC bond referendum was approved during the March, 2015 primary election. Funds from the bond will be used to construct a new Asia region to attract more than 1 million people a year.

On August 19, 2022, the zoo officially broke ground on the Asia region of the Zoo. In June 2026, the General Assembly passed a budget including a one-time $1.3 million payment to complete this expansion and $6.2 million in recurring funds, to support the addition of 54 full-time employees.

== Future plans ==
On April 1, 2010, the Zoo announced it had acquired adjacent forestland to bring the total land tract to over 2,000 acres (8.1 km^{2}). The main habitats currently occupy about 500 acres (2.0 km^{2}). The North Carolina Zoo was one of many state facilities to receive money from the Connect NC bond referendum, approved during the March 2015 primary election. In June 2018, the Zoo announced that it is in the final planning stages for two new continents: Asia and Australia. Funds from the Connect NC bond will be used to construct the new Asia region which will include tigers, Komodo dragons (which originally arrived at the zoo as juveniles exhibited in the Desert Dome), Visayan warty pigs, Asian small-clawed otters, cinereous vultures, red-crowned cranes, wrinkled hornbills, king cobras and northern white-cheeked gibbons among others. The Zoo broke ground on the Asia Continent expansion in August 2022. The North Carolina Zoo has announced the grand opening for the Asia Continent exhibit to be March 1, 2027.

== Attractions ==
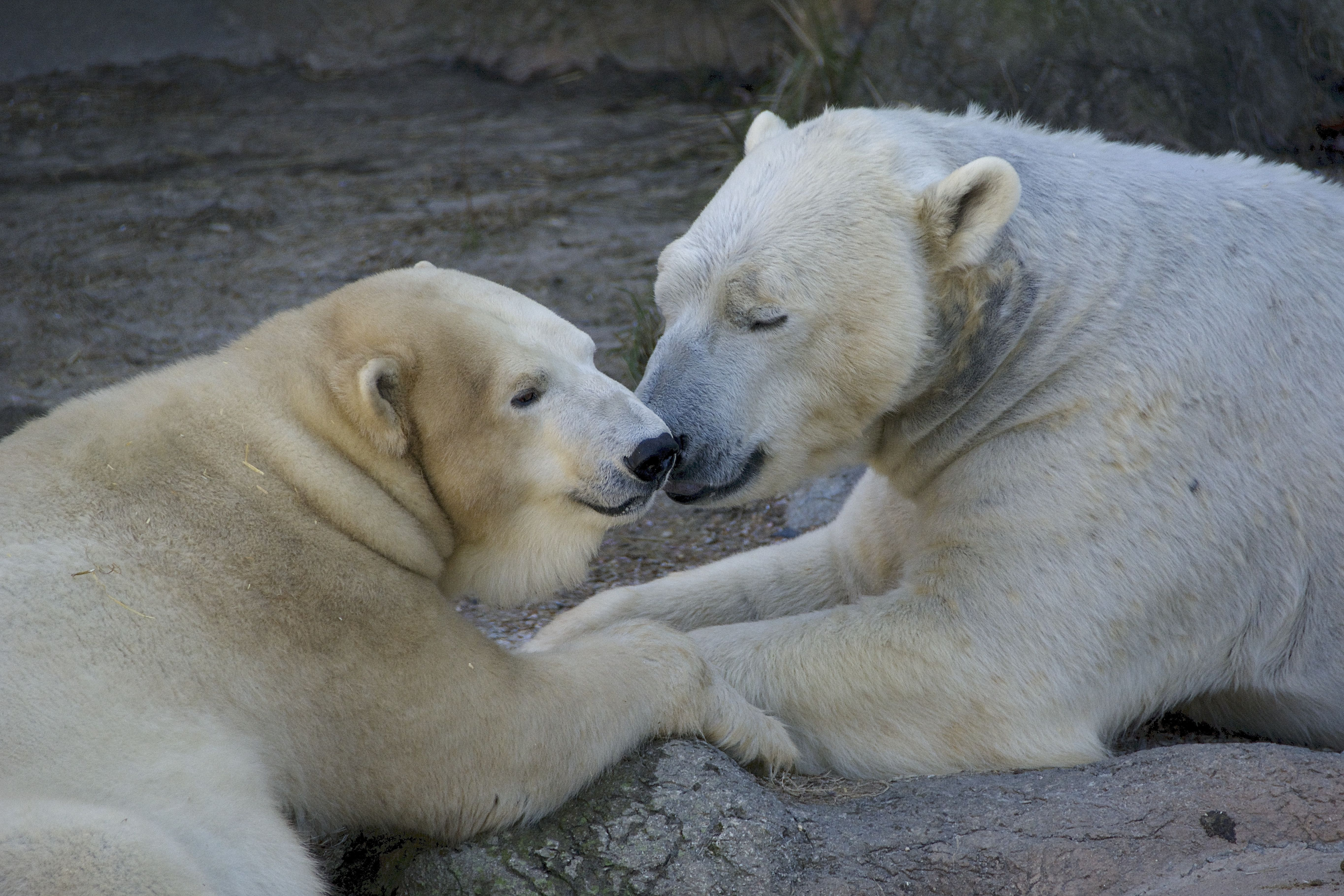
Polar bears at the zoo.

The North Carolina Zoo is home to 1,700 animals of more than 200 species. The zoo is home to one of the largest chimpanzee troops of any zoo in America as well as the largest collection of Alaskan seabirds in the country. The Zoo is also one of only a few AZA (Association of Zoos & Aquariums) in the U.S. with a breeding pair of polar bears which is part of the Species Survival Plan. As of 2022, the pair have yet to produce any offspring.

=== Layout ===
The North Carolina Zoo consists of Africa, North America, and a global Desert. There are parking lots located on each end of Africa and North America, so, during peak season, visitors can start their day from either side. With approximately 5 miles (8.0 km) of walking paths, the Zoo also provides trams and air-conditioned buses for visitors.

The North Carolina Zoo's founding philosophy was that of having natural habitats – presenting animals together with plants in habitats that resemble the habitats in which they would be found in the wild. The 40-acre (160,000 m^{2}) Watani Grasslands habitat alone is as large as many entire zoos.

=== North America ===
The Cypress Swamp area is home to American alligators, alligator snapping turtles, cougars and a variety of reptiles and amphibians. The Rocky Coast depicts the rocky coasts of the Pacific Northwest, with North American porcupines, polar bears, harbor seals, Arctic foxes, thick-billed murres, parakeet auklets, and horned puffins. The streams of North Carolina can be seen in the Streamside habitat with bobcats, North American river otters, barred owls, and several snakes including cottonmouths, eastern copperheads and timber rattlesnakes, and fish. At the Prairie habitat, visitors can see American bison and elk. American black bears, grizzly bears and red wolves also each have their own habitats.

=== Desert ===
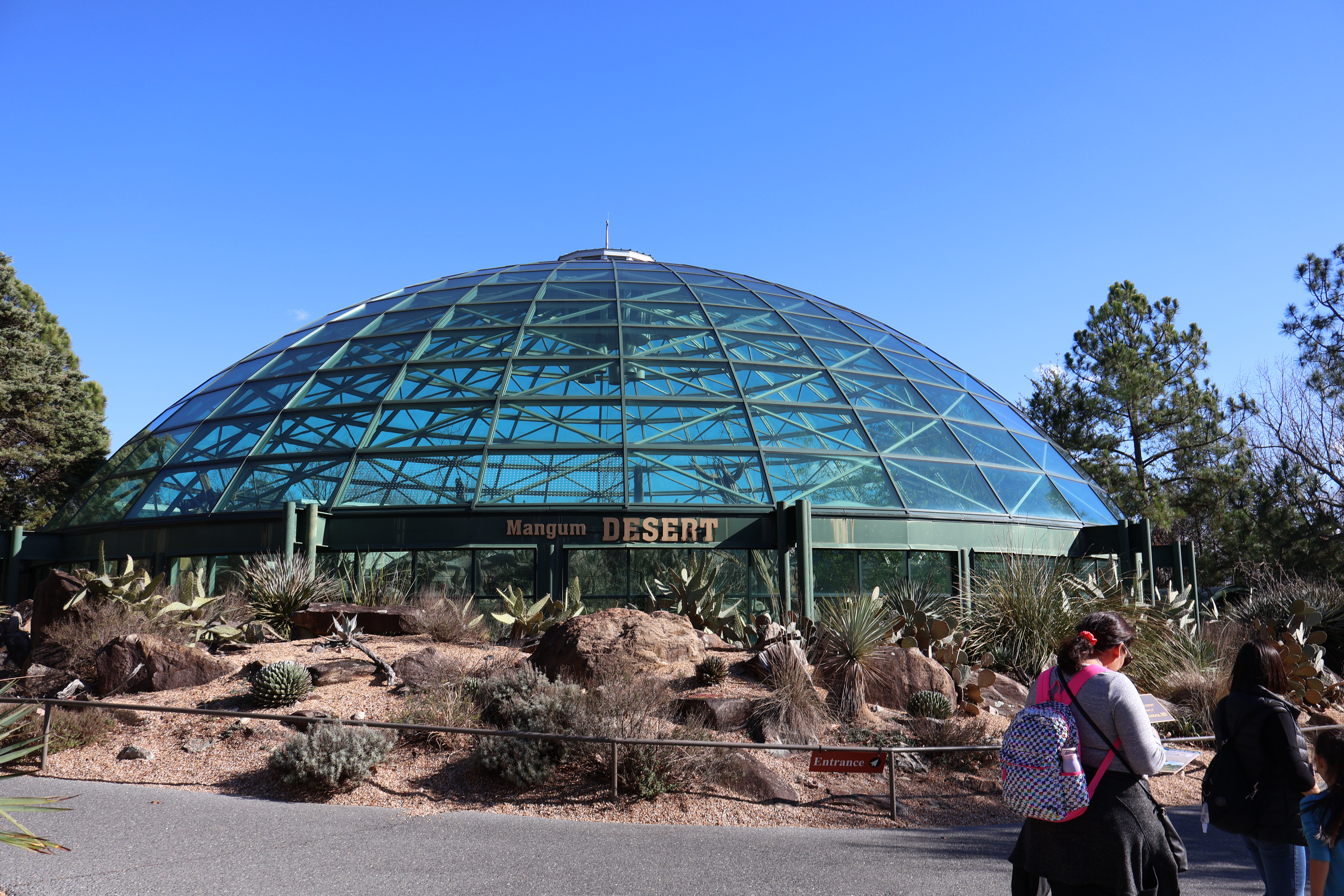
The Desert Dome.

The flora and fauna of deserts are on display in the glass-domed "Mangum Desert". Outside are ocelots, while inside are a variety of reptiles such as blue-tongued skinks, spiny-tailed monitors, ornate uromastyx, Gila monsters, Mexican beaded lizards, desert tortoises, pancake tortoises, and birds such as burrowing owls, greater roadrunners, Von der Decken's hornbills, laughing kookaburras, white-winged doves, Gambel's quail, white-headed buffalo weavers, and crested couas. A separate enclosure within the dome houses sand cats. A nocturnal section contains common vampire bats, gray mouse lemurs, brush-tailed bettongs, and sidewinders.

=== Aviary ===
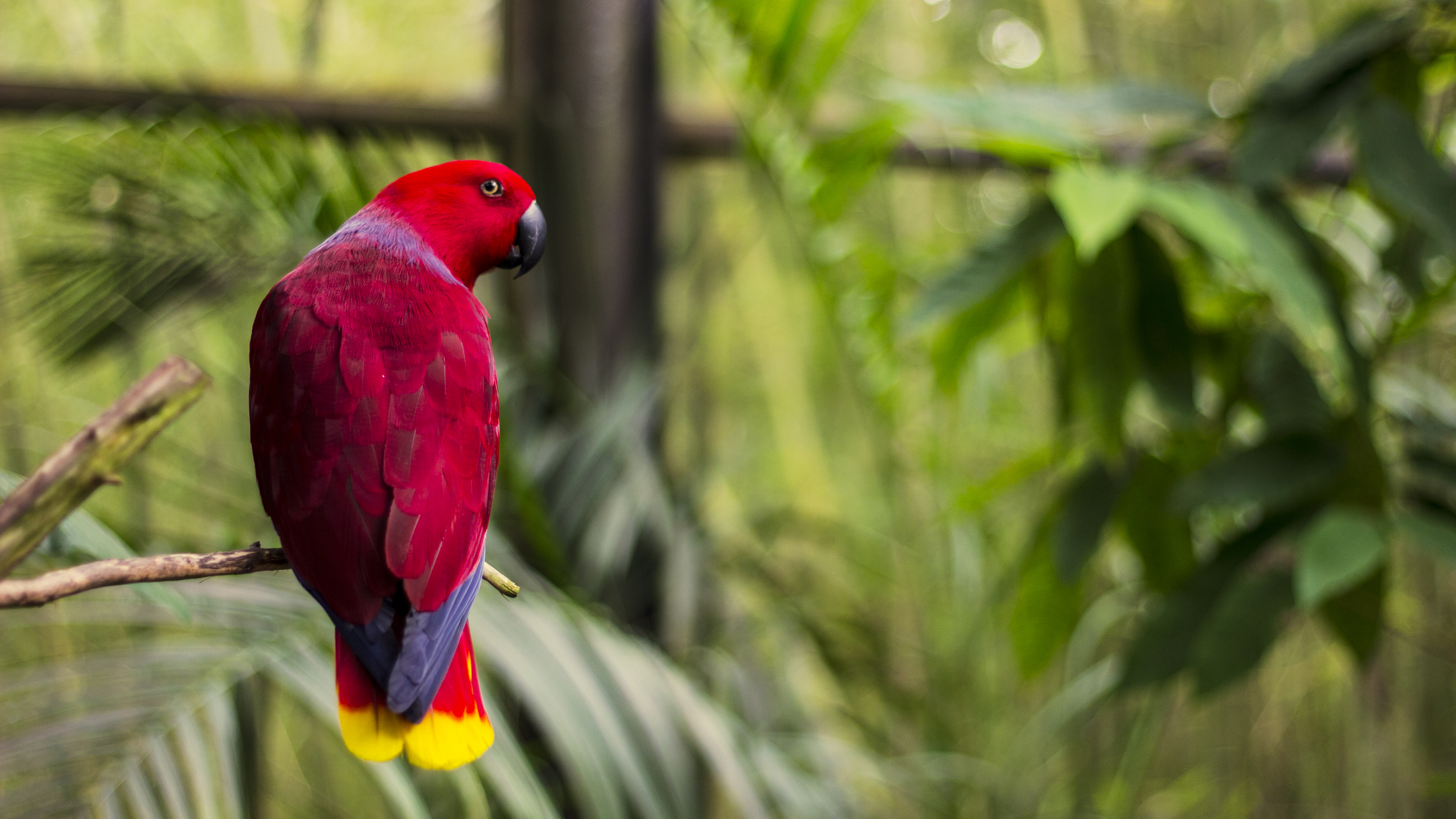
One of the birds in the Aviary.

The R. J. Reynolds Forest Aviary recreated the hot, humid conditions of a tropical forest. The aviary displays more than three thousand tropical plants and allowed visitors to walk among different species of free-flying tropicbirds including, sunbitterns, Victoria crowned pigeons, masked lapwings, Nicobar pigeons, Asian fairy-bluebirds, among many others including Madagascar ibises. The North Carolina Zoo's Aviary was listed among the bird exhibits in the US by USA Today.

On April 21, 2022, the Zoo announced the permanent closure of the R.J. Reynolds Forest Aviary due to structural deterioration caused by high humidity and wet conditions. The aviary had previously been closed since January 2022 due to avian influenza being detected in wild birds in North Carolina. A Chilean flamingo exhibit located outside of the aviary was the last part of the building to be open, but the flamingos were eventually sent to the Greenville Zoo in Greenville, South Carolina. However, efforts are ongoing to potentially rebuild the Aviary in a different part of the zoo.

=== Africa ===
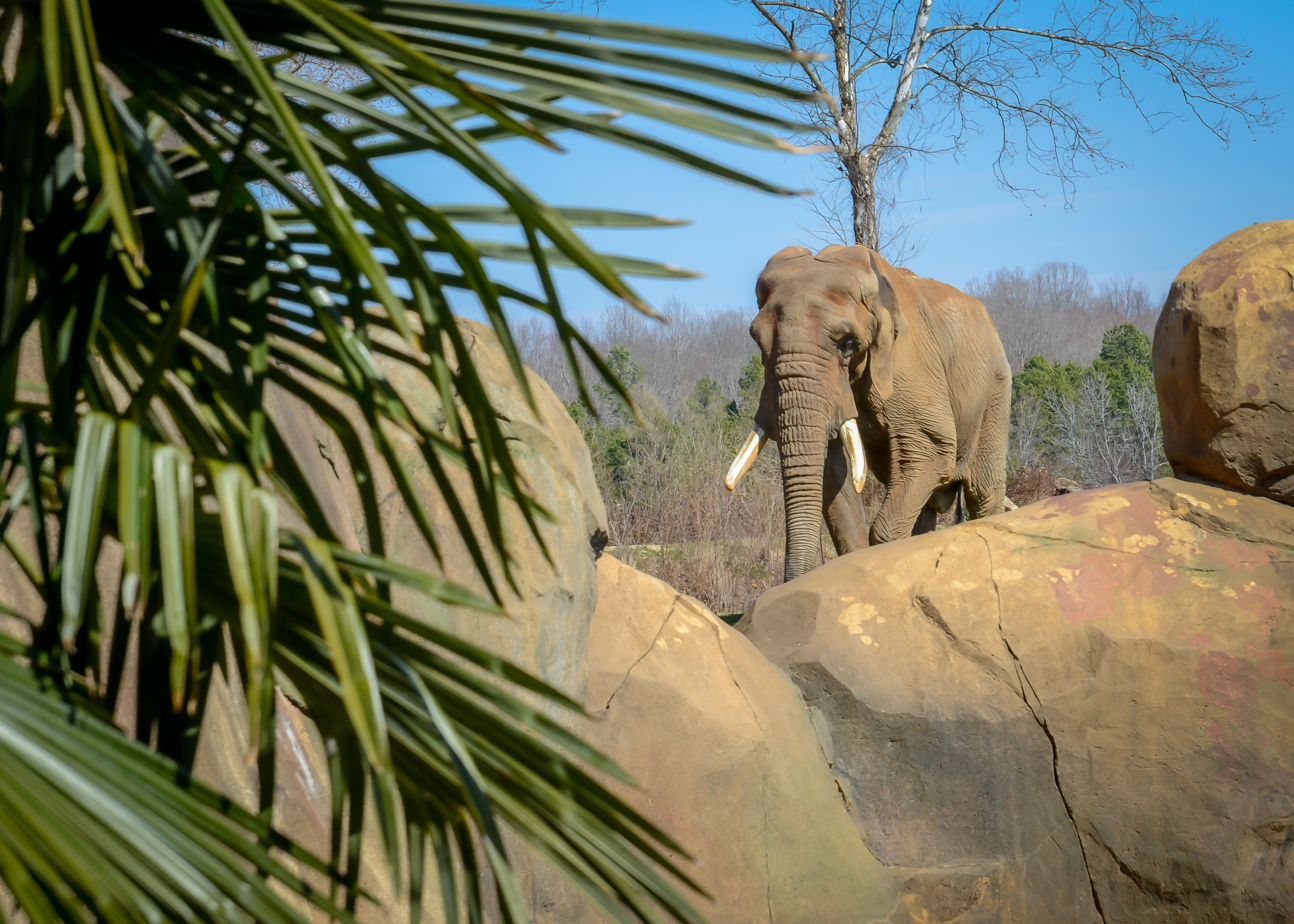
Elephant habitat.

The Forest Edge habitat is a 3.5-acre (14,000 m^{2}), lightly wooded grassland enclosure with plains zebras, common ostriches, and reticulated giraffes. The Watani Grasslands Reserve mimics the great savannas of Africa, totaling 47-acre (190,000 m^{2}) and is home to a herd of African elephants. Nearby southern white rhinoceroses, Thomson's gazelles, addra gazelles, waterbucks, fringe-eared oryxes, greater kudu, and bongos all share a habitat, designed to look as one continuous expanse with the elephants looking out at the rhinos and the antelope. Chimpanzees can be seen in the Kibale Forest habitat. Western lowland gorillas inhabit the Forest Glade exhibit. Lions, hamadryas baboons, and red river hogs each have their own habitats. Red-ruffed lemurs from neighboring Madagascar were also in the Africa region after a refurbishment of the former patas monkey habitat.

=== Art ===
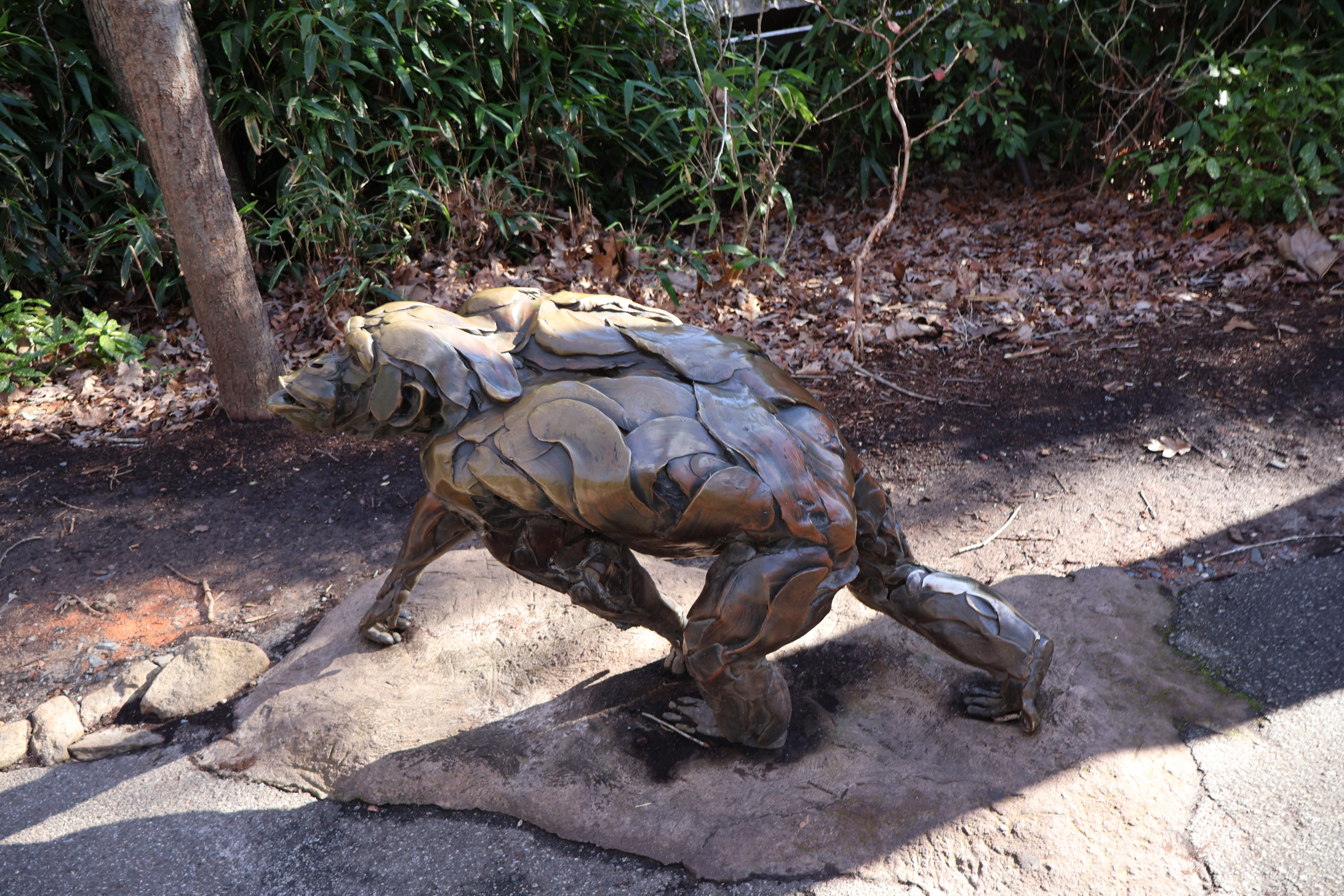
Chimpanzee artwork in the zoo.

The North Carolina Zoo is home to a large collection of art, primarily sculpture, although there are also murals, mosaics, and paintings. Primarily depictions of animals and their habitats, the artwork uses a variety of materials including marble, steel, bronze, fiberglass, limestone, glass, cement, and others. The Zoo's art is intended to enliven and enrich the guest experience and help fulfill its mission by "promoting individual discovery and new ways of thinking."

The two largest sculptures are located at the Zoo's main entrances. One, "Sum of the Parts" is a pile of large metal cubes, about 1 yard (0.91 m) on a side. Most of the cubes are shiny and depict extant species, but a few rusted cubes memorialize extinct species. The second, "The Elephant Group" depicts several large elephants in bronze. The works were installed in 1998.

== Research and conservation ==
=== Africa ===
The NC Zoo is involved in several research and conservation projects. Together with the World Wildlife Fund and the government of Cameroon, the zoo participates in a project to track the movements of elephants through satellite tracking collars in order to expand reserves and parks in a way that protects the most crucial areas of their habitats. The project was recognized in 2008 by the AZA with a Significant Achievement in Conservation Award. Also in Cameroon and its neighbor, Nigeria, the Zoo is working on a project to monitor the rare Cross River gorilla, a subspecies that was thought extinct for many years. Its remote habitat is difficult to access, so with the help of satellite imaging and GPS systems, the Zoo coordinates with park rangers and other conservation groups to map their habitat and movements and assist efforts to ensure their continued survival.

The Zoo also operates projects in Uganda. An education project around Kibale National Park has been in place for over 10 years and aims to educate young people about the purpose of the park and the value of biological conservation. It also supports research at the Ngogo field research site inside the park. Ngogo researchers study primate plant use and rainforest regrowth after logging among other things, and remove illegal snares from the park which can seriously injure or kill protected animals.

=== North Carolina ===
A number of projects are also underway in North Carolina. Protection and research of the hellbender salamander, which is globally recognized as near threatened but is classified as "endangered" in several US states including North Carolina, is the target of a project in the Appalachian Mountains. Due to the steep decline in population in the past 30 years, the Zoo conducted a thorough survey, with the help of the AZA, into the hellbender populations of western North Carolina.

The Zoo is also involved in project to restore the population of endangered Schweinitz's sunflower. In 2001, a road expansion project by the North Carolina Department of Transportation threatened a significant population of the flowers. The Zoo partnered with a number of individuals and organizations and successfully managed their transplant to an off-road site, which continues to be managed and monitored by Zoo horticulturalists.

=== Species Survival Plan ===
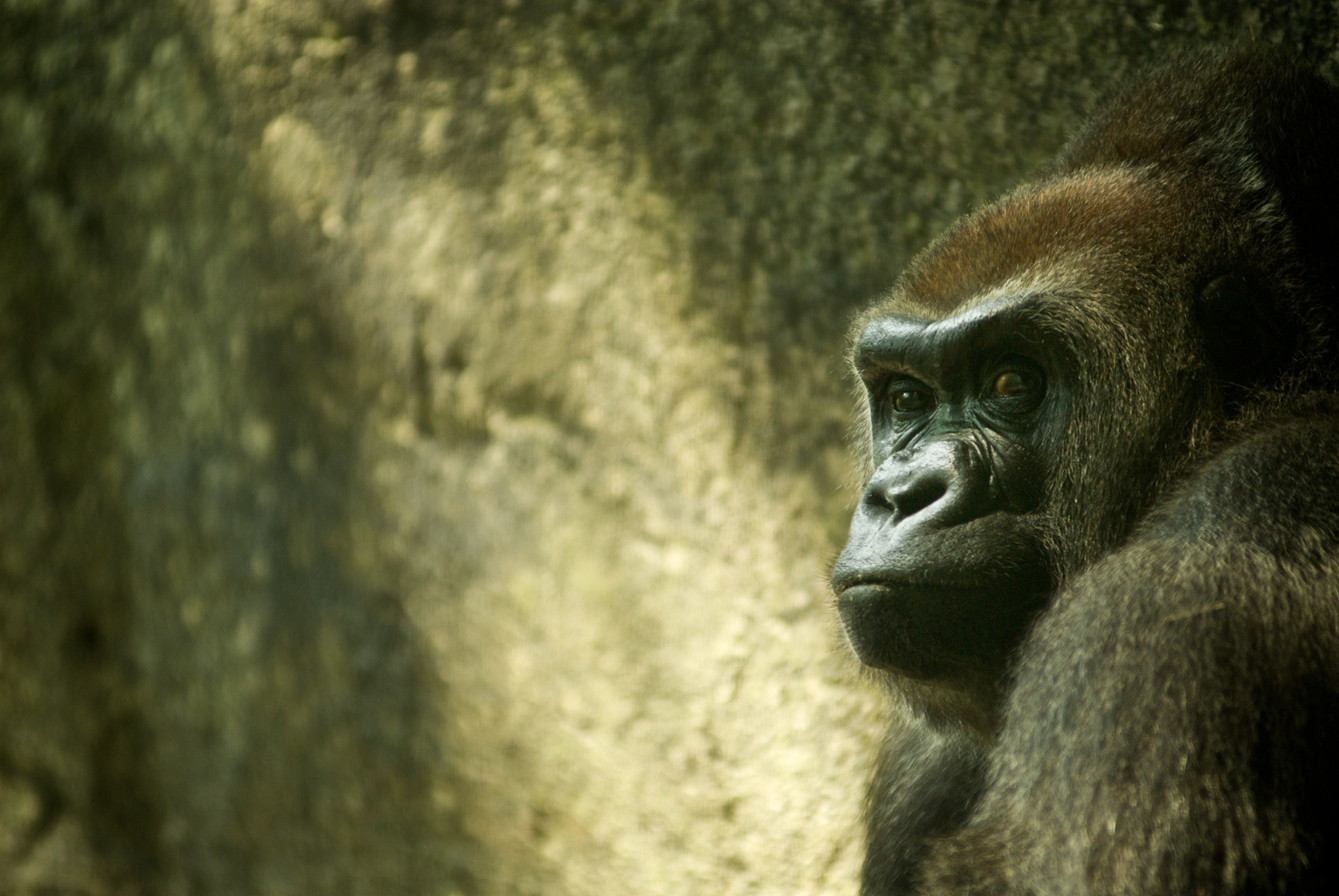
One of the Species Survival Plans has involved work with gorillas.

Since 1995, the North Carolina Zoo has been a part of the American Red Wolf Species Survival Plan and reintroduction program. The Zoo is also involved in the gorilla Species Survival Plan and received two female gorillas in early 2010 as part of the effort. As a result of their successful breeding, two male gorillas (Bomassa and Apollo) were born in August 2012. The Aviary was also known for several high-profile hatchings, including the first U.S hatchings of the golden white-eye, the red-faced liocichla, the African pied barbet, the golden-headed manakin, the horned puffin, the parakeet auklet and the thick-billed murre as well as the second US hatchings of the African grey-headed kingfisher and the African spoonbill.

Two southern white rhino calves were born at the North Carolina Zoo during the summer of 2018, with another two born in 2020.

== Organization ==
The Zoo is part of the North Carolina Department of Natural and Cultural Resources. Its operation and development are overseen by a 15-member Zoo Council appointed by the Governor to six-year terms. The director of the North Carolina Zoo is Pat Simmons, formerly the director of Akron Zoo. Simmons took over from long-time director, Dr. David Jones, who retired in 2015. The Zoo's annual operating budget is roughly $18 million. It receives around 60 percent from the state with the remainder being made up of ticket and merchandise sales and donations from the North Carolina Zoological Society, which remains the Zoo's fund-raising and membership arm. The Zoological Society is overseen by its board of directors. The chairman of the board is always a member of the Zoological Council and the two groups meet once annually.

== Gallery ==
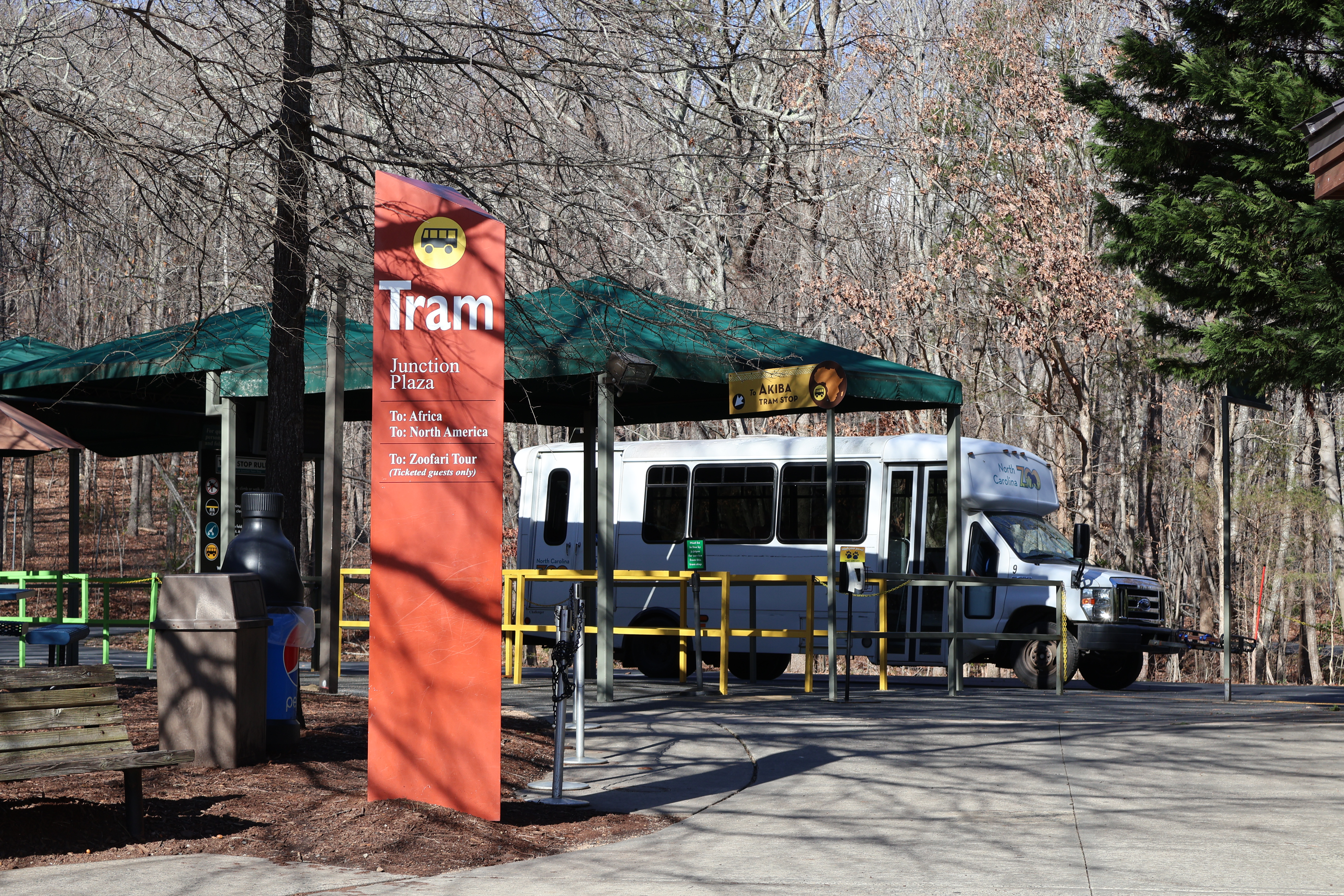
Tram Bus

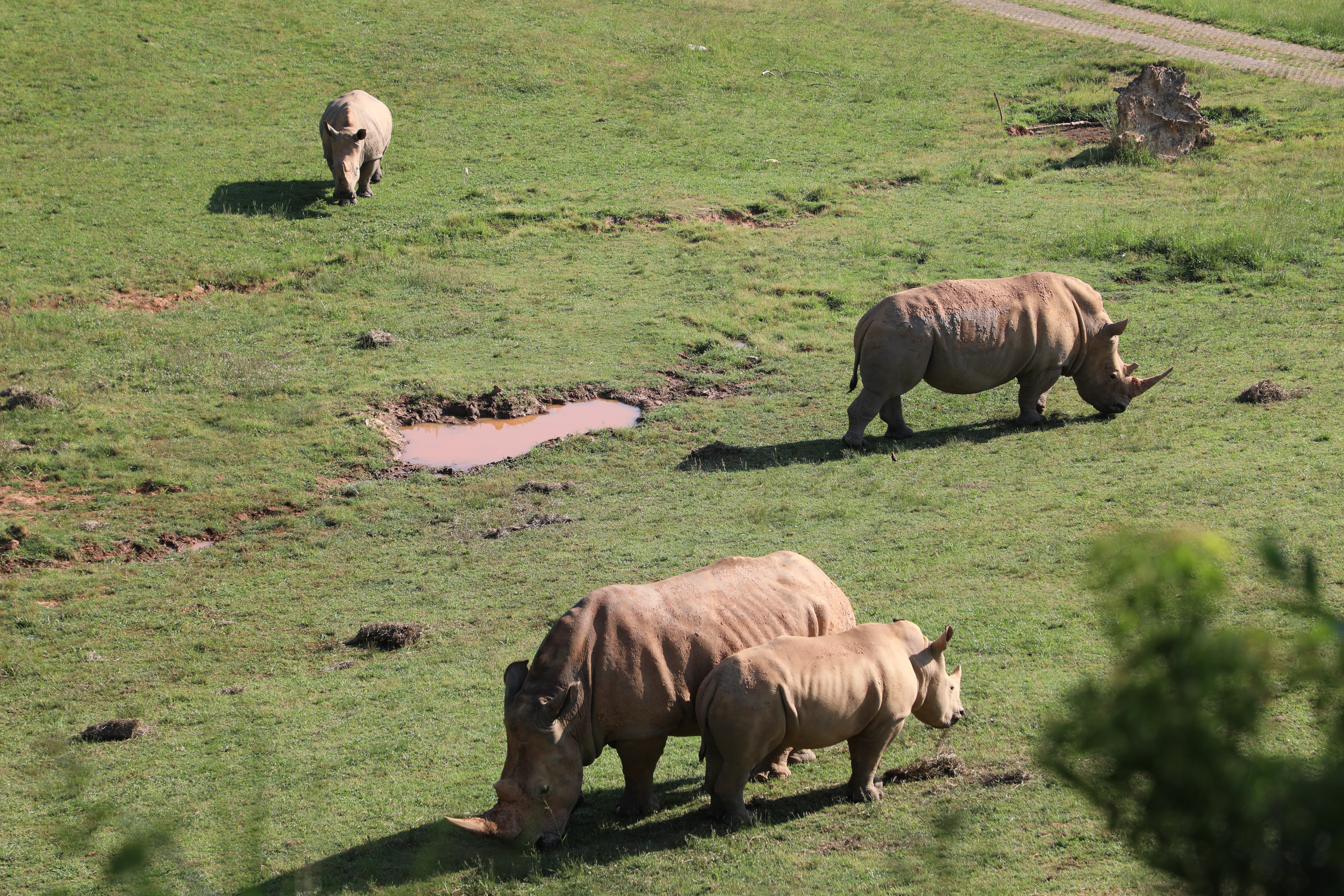
Rhinos at the Watani Grasslands

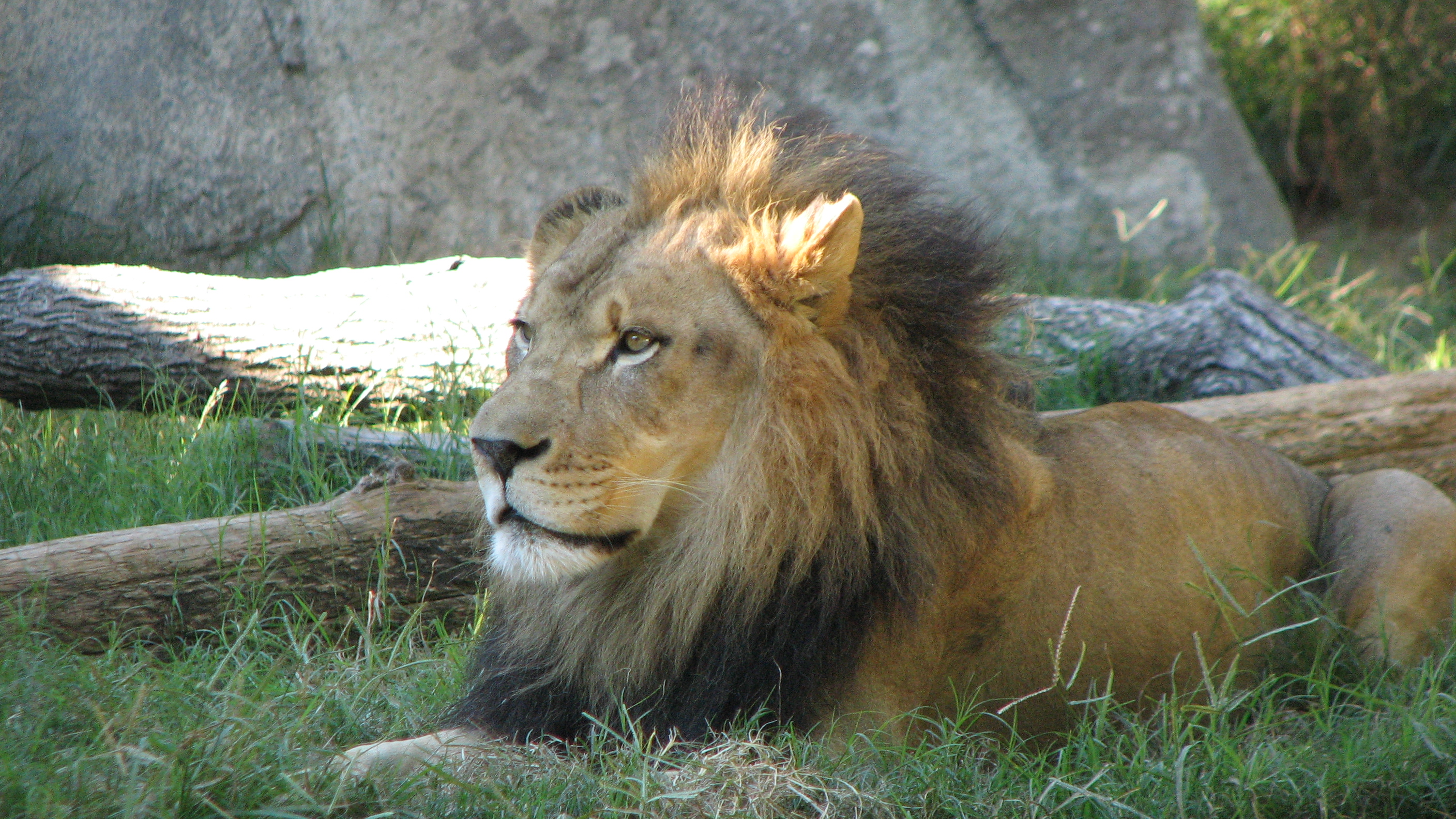
Lion

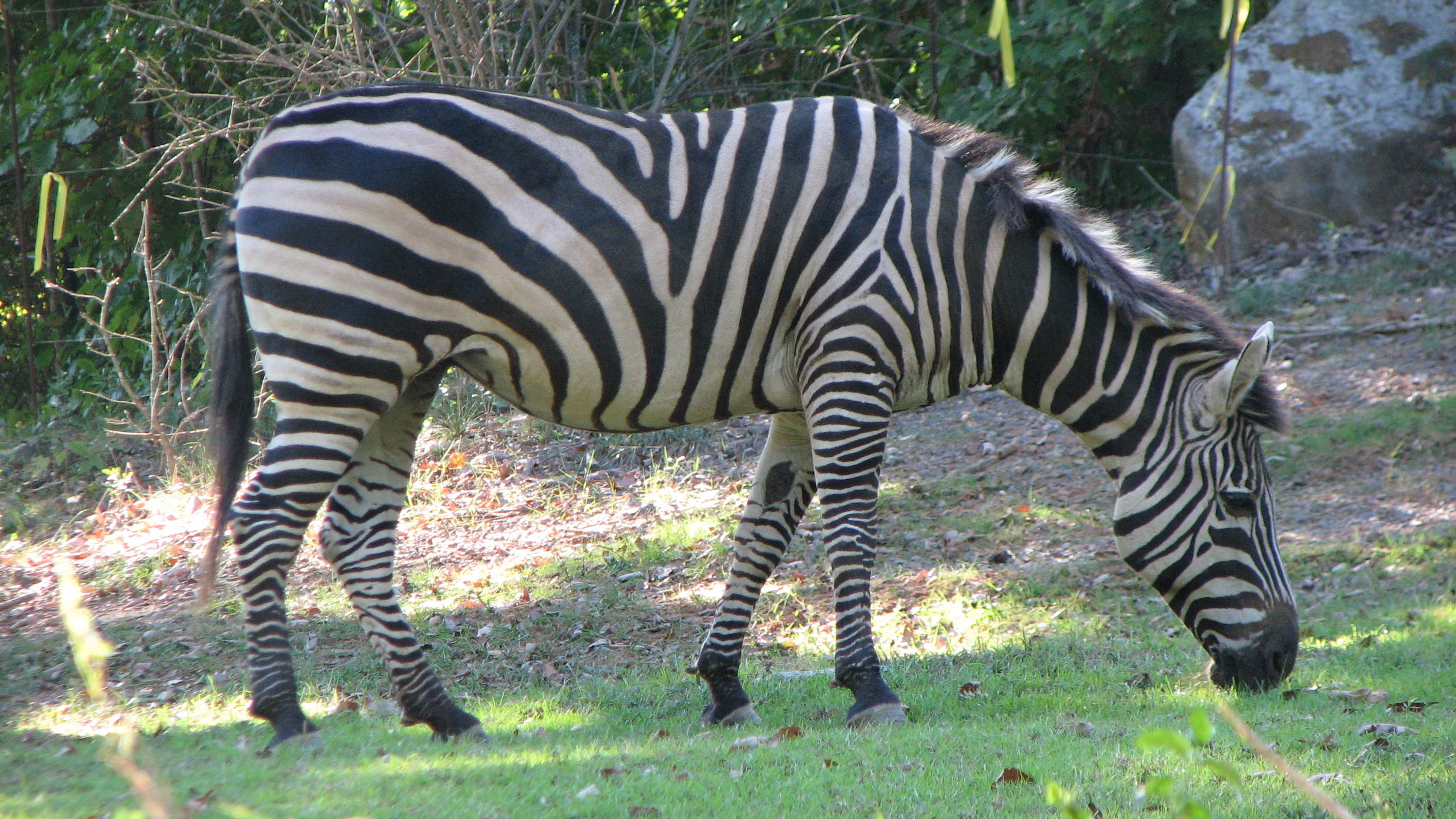
Zebra

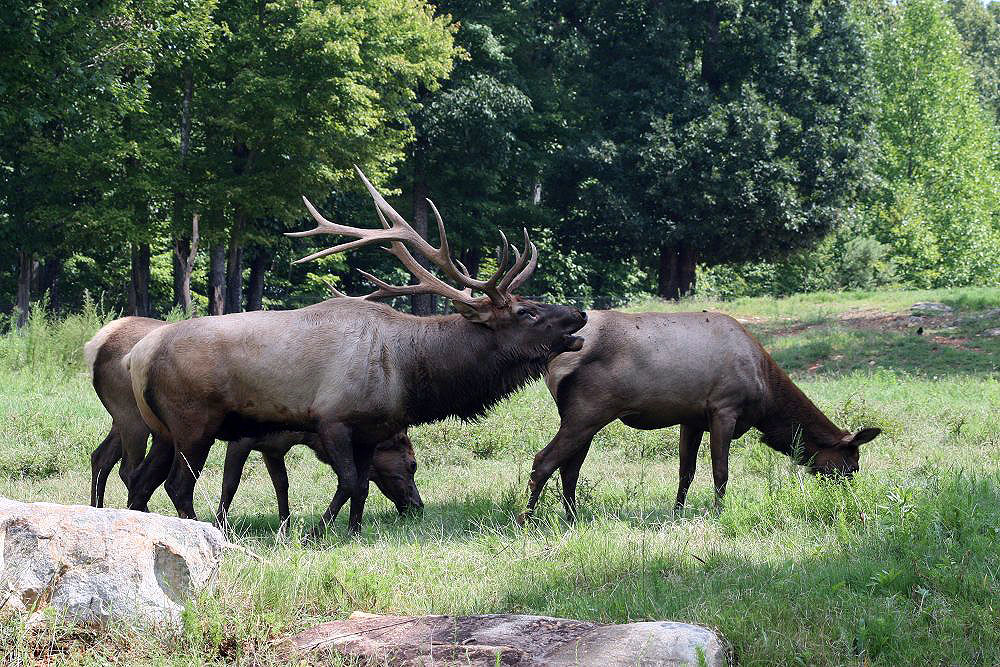
Elk (Cervus canadensis)

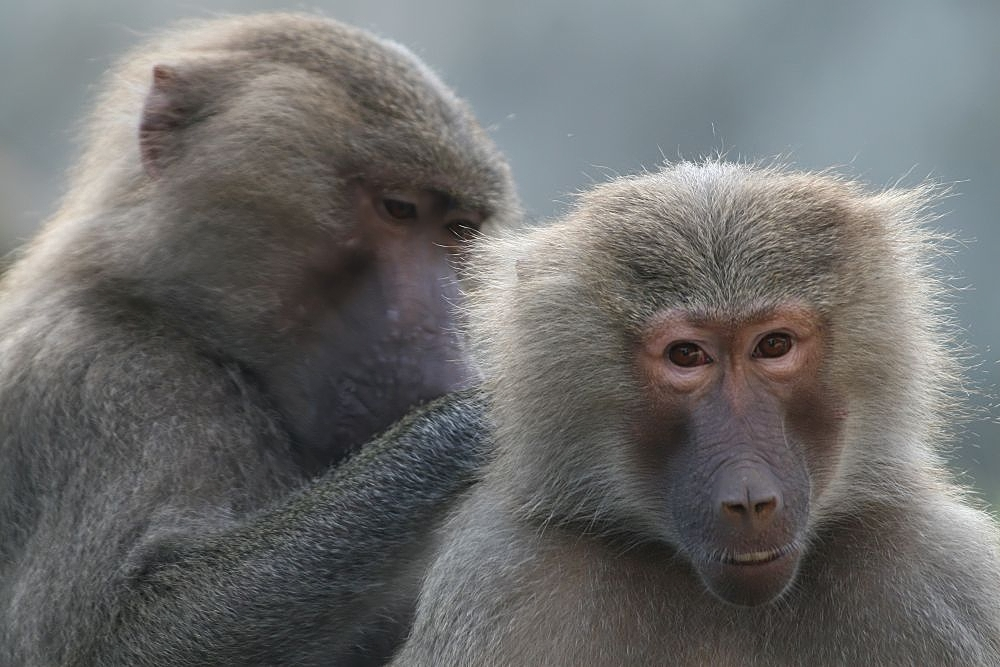
Hamadryas baboons (Papio hamadryas) socially grooming

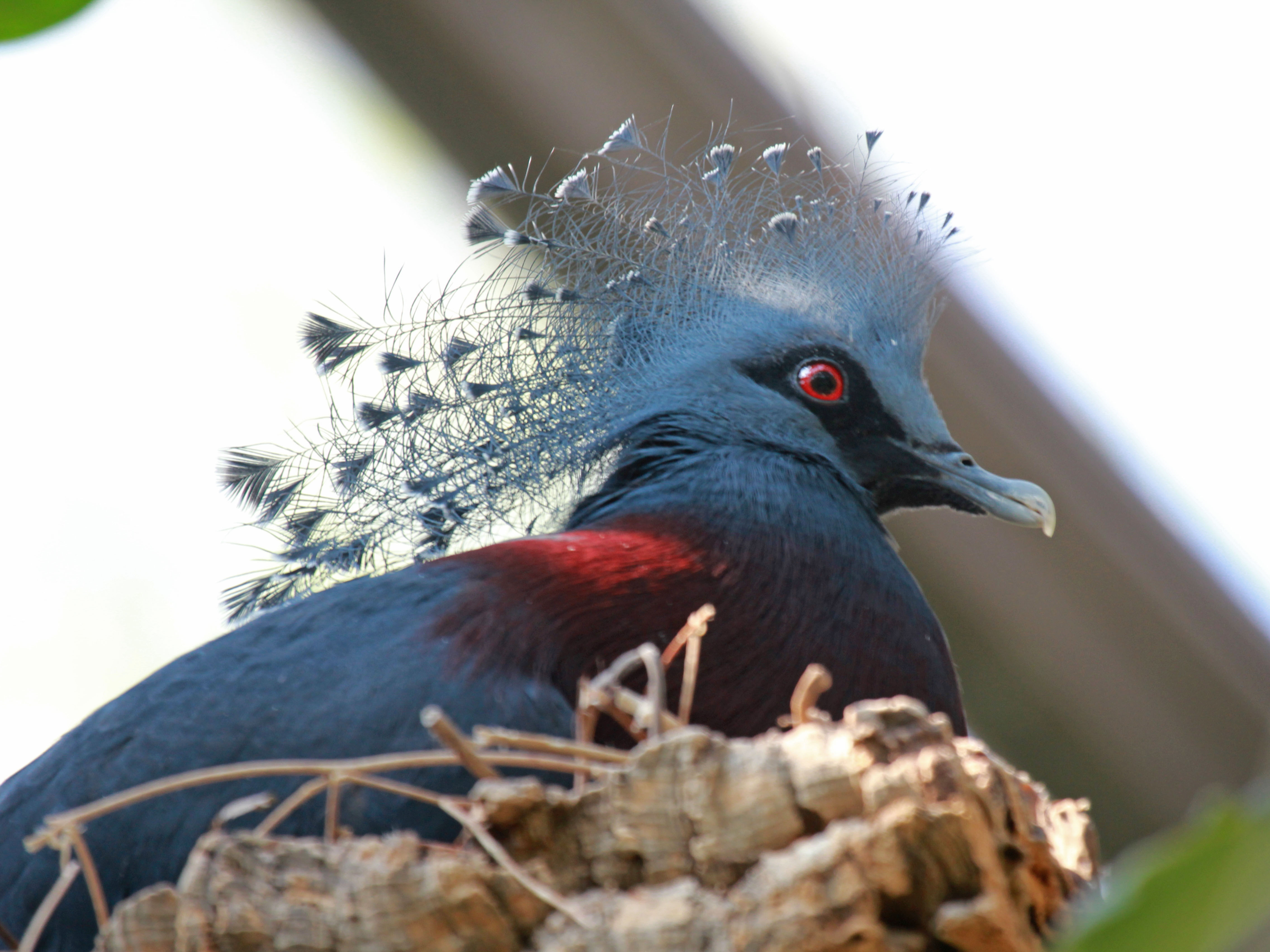
Victoria crowned pigeon (Goura victoria)

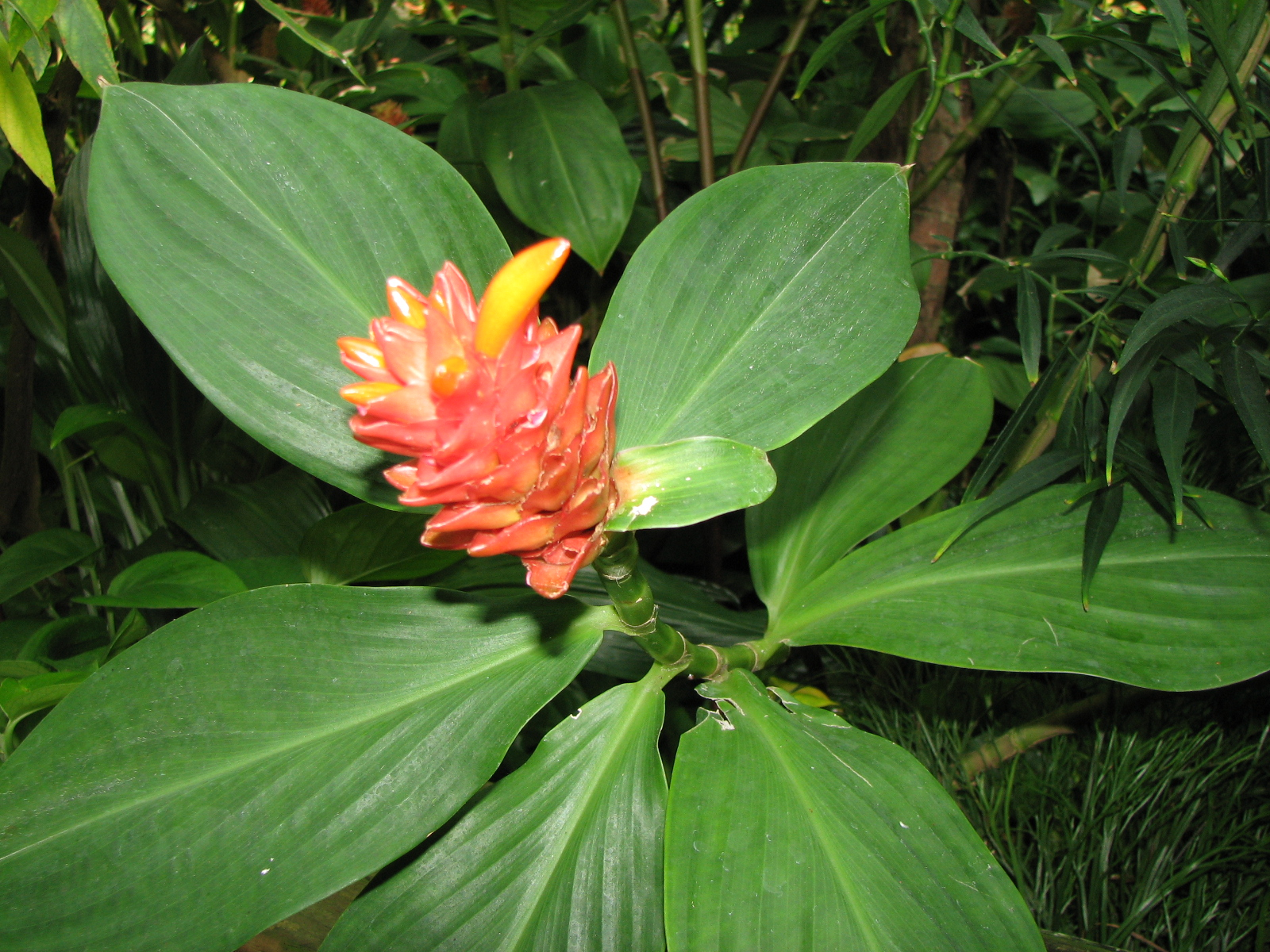
One of the many flowering plants at the zoo
