= Maple, North Carolina =

Unincorporated community in North Carolina, US

Coordinates: 36°25′9.9″N 76°2′1″W

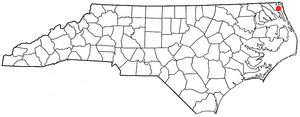
Location of Maple, North Carolina

Maple is an unincorporated community in Crawford Township, Currituck County, North Carolina, United States, located at the intersection of NC Highway 168 and SR 1246 (Maple Road). Maple is located at latitude 36.4148780 North, and longitude -76.0040925 West. The elevation is three feet. Maple appears on the Currituck U.S. Geological Survey Map.

The United States Postal Service operates a post office located at 3452 Caratoke Hwy., Maple, NC. The zip code for Maple is 27956.

The community of Maple is bounded on the east by Coinjock Bay, a tributary of Currituck Sound; on the west by the Great Swamp; on the south by the unincorporated community of Barco and on the north by the unincorporated community of Currituck.

== Government and education facilities ==
Maple is home to the following local governmental and education facilities:

- College of The Albemarle Regional Aviation Technical Training Center
- Currituck County Detention Facility, 413A Maple Rd., Maple, NC 27956
- Currituck County Regional Airport, Airport Rd., Maple, NC 27956
- Currituck County Sheriff's Office, 413A Maple Rd., Maple, NC 27956
- Currituck County Water Plant, 442 Maple Rd., Maple, NC 27956
- NC DOT Maintenance Yard, 397 Maple Rd., Maple, NC 27956

== Nearby cities and towns ==
- Currituck 3.2 mi east-northeast
- Barco 3.6 mi southeast
- Shawboro 3.6 mi southwest
- Coinjock 5.8 southeast
- Moyock 7.9 mi northwest
- Knotts Island 7.9 mi northeast
- Camden 9 mi southwest
- Aydlett 10.4 mi southeast
- Corolla 10.5 mi east
- Shiloh 12.8 mi south

== Regional cities and towns ==
- Norfolk, Va 38.9 mi north-northwest
- Elizabeth City 17.7 mi west-southwest
- Raleigh 183 mi west-southwest
- Greenville 116 mi southwest
- Kitty Hawk 34.8 mi southeast
