= North Carolina Highway 615 =

State highway in Currituck County, North Carolina, US

North Carolina Highway 615

Route information
- Maintained by NCDOT
- Length: 14.9 mi (24.0 km)
- Existed: 1963–present

Major junctions
- South end: NC 168 / Currituck–Knotts Island Ferry in Currituck
- North end: Princess Anne Road at the Virginia state line

Location
- Country: United States
- State: North Carolina
- Counties: Currituck

Highway system
- North Carolina Highway System; Interstate; US; State; Scenic
← NC 610	→ NC 690

North Carolina Highway 615 (NC 615) is a primary state highway in the U.S. state of North Carolina. It connects Knotts Island with mainland North Carolina via the Currituck–Knotts Island Ferry.

== Route description ==
NC 615 connects the community of Knotts Island with both mainland North Carolina and Virginia. The 14.9 miles (24.0 km) route begins at NC 168, in Currituck, where it goes east and crosses over the Currituck Sound, via the Currituck-Knotts Island Ferry. On Knotts Island, it continues north for nine miles (14 km) before reaching the Virginia state line. On the island, the route is well signed and borders the Mackay Island National Wildlife Refuge.

Ferry service, which predates the highway by one year (1962), was established originally to shorten the travel time for Knott's Island school children to their school on the mainland (in Barco). The ferry is free with year-round service with travel times of 45 minutes on average.

The highway is the northeasternmost primary route in the state. The entire route is concurrent with North Carolina Bicycle Route 4.

== History ==
Established around 1963 as a new primary routing, NC 615 was located only on Knotts Island. At some point before 2001, the highway was extended overlapping the Currituck-Knotts Island Ferry, ending on the mainland at Courthouse Road. On April 9, 2013, it was extended .36 miles (0.58 km) northwest along Courthouse Road to end at its current southern terminus at NC 168. Justification for the extension was to connect to North Carolina Highway 168 and remove a gap.

== Major intersections ==
The entire route is in Currituck County.

Location	mi	km	Destinations	Notes
Currituck	0.0	0.0	NC 168 (Caratoke Highway) – Moyock, Kill Devil Hills	
Currituck Sound	0.4	0.64	Currituck-Knotts Island Ferry	
	14.9	24.0	Princess Anne Road	Virginia state line
1.000 mi = 1.609 km; 1.000 km = 0.621 mi
