= North Carolina Highway 34 =

State highway in North Carolina, US

North Carolina Highway 34

Route information
- Maintained by NCDOT
- Length: 9.2 mi (14.8 km)
- Existed: 1970s–present

Major junctions
- South end: US 158 near Camden
- North end: NC 168 near Currituck

Location
- Country: United States
- State: North Carolina
- Counties: Camden, Currituck

Highway system
- North Carolina Highway System; Interstate; US; State; Scenic
← NC 33	→ NC 35

North Carolina Highway 34 (NC 34) is a short primary state highway in the U.S. state of North Carolina. Spanning a distance of 9.177 miles (14.769 km), the route passes through a few small unincorporated communities in eastern North Carolina's Inner Banks near Elizabeth City.

== Route description ==
The route's southern terminus is the intersection with US 158 in the community of Belcross, in Camden County. From there, it progresses in a general northeastern direction through Hastings Corners, where it also becomes known as Shawboro Road. After uniting with Indiantown Road, NC 34 continues north to its northern terminus at NC 168 in Sligo, Currituck County.

== History ==
Over the years since the 1930s, NC 34 has occupied a variety of routes in the northeastern part of North Carolina, including current-day NC 168, NC 343, NC 344, and US 158.

== Major intersections ==
County	Location	mi	km	Destinations	Notes
Camden	Camden	0.0	0.0	US 158 – Nags Head, Elizabeth City	Southern terminus
Currituck	Currituck	9.2	14.8	NC 168 – Moyock, Currituck Sound Ferry	Northern terminus
1.000 mi = 1.609 km; 1.000 km = 0.621 mi
