= Arapahoe, North Carolina =

- Town
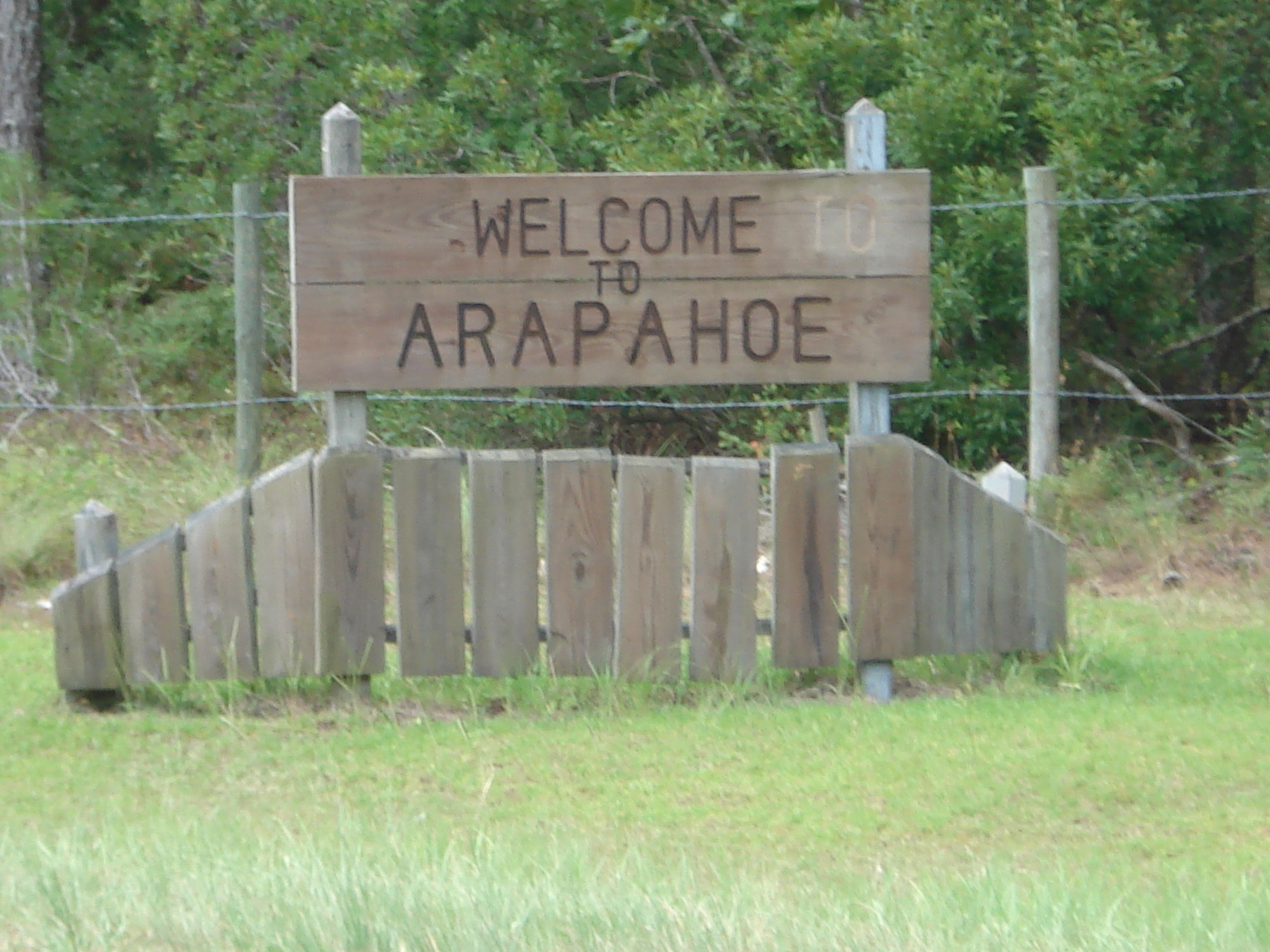

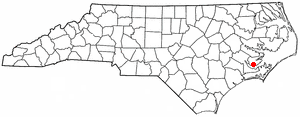
- Location of Arapahoe, North Carolina
- Coordinates: 35°01′17″N 76°49′33″W
- Country: United States
- State: North Carolina
- County: Pamlico
- Founded: Circa 1714
- Incorporated: 1921

Government
  - Mayor: Ken Heath

Area
  - Total: 2.17 sq mi (5.62 km^{2})
  - Land: 2.17 sq mi (5.62 km^{2})
  - Water: 0 sq mi (0.00 km^{2})
- Elevation: 43 ft (13 m)

Population (2020)
  - Total: 416
  - Density: 191.6/sq mi (73.98/km^{2})
- Time zone: UTC-5 (EST)
  - Summer (DST): UTC-4 (EDT)
- ZIP Code: 28510
- Area code: 252
- FIPS code: 37-01640
- GNIS feature ID: 2405159

Arapahoe (/əˈræpəhoʊ/ uh-RAP-uh-hoh) is a town in Pamlico County, North Carolina, United States. At the 2020 census, the population was 416. Arapahoe shares many of its roles and duties with Minnesott Beach, North Carolina. It is part of the New Bern, North Carolina Micropolitan Statistical Area.

== History ==
Arapahoe was founded a few years after New Bern, North Carolina by settlers leaving the New Bern colony. This area was settled in 1703 on the old Indian trail from the big bend in the river heading west to Core Point. The community was called “Bethany Crossroads”. That Indian trail is still in use today but is now called North Carolina Highway 306. In 1886 Bob Hardison, after discussing it with his friend Bob Bowden decided to apply to the U.S. Postal Department for a Post office to be located at “Bethany Crossroads” in Pamlico County. They filled out an application and both signed it. When it was returned to them it was addressed to “Bob’s Town”, the reason being that there was already a “Bethany Crossroads” in the vicinity of Fayetteville. Neither of the Bobs liked “Bob’s Town” so they had to come up with a different name. After a lengthy discussion Bob Hardison said “Well if you have no objection, we will name it after my old white horse, Arapahoe.” So it was decided and a new application filed. It was likely a year or longer before all paperwork was completed, but “Bethany Crossroads” was no more and there by named the Town of Arapahoe. Arapahoe is a Native American tribe whose historic territory spanned regions of present-day Wyoming and Colorado.

== Government ==
Arapahoe government is headed by the mayor of the town. Along with the mayor, there are several town commissioners, a planning board, and a volunteer fire department. The mayor and commissioners are elected to two year terms. The town hall is a small building located along the main street (NC 306) in Arapahoe.

== Education ==
Public Education
Arapahoe has education opportunities available for children grades Kindergarten through High School. Arapahoe Charter School was opened in 1997 to replace Arapahoe Elementary School. There are currently 560 students enrolled, with 40 teachers available. Arapahoe Charter School has a student:teacher ratio of 14:1.

Arapahoe Charter School is currently a K-12 school housed in a new $9 million facility opening for the 2018-19 school year.

Arapahoe is also home to the Don Lee Center, a Methodist founded center for camping and recreation as well as for renowned public environmental education.

Higher Education
For Higher Education, Pamlico Community College (PCC) allows for associate degrees in many areas. From PCC, one can transfer to East Carolina University to complete a bachelors and graduates degree. PCC is located only minutes from Arapahoe along NC Highway 306.

== Media ==
The Pamlico News (http://www.thepamliconews.com) Pamlico Ink: The Newspaper of the Pamlico Sound

== Business ==
Arapahoe is the home of several small businesses. The largest industry in Arapahoe is agriculture. Other businesses include seafood management, home improvement, florist, food service, and other service industries. Another industry that appears to be growing in the Arapahoe area is bio-diesel production.

Another large business located in the Arapahoe area is summer camps. Within the Arapahoe area, there are four camps: Camp Sea Gull for boys (YMCA affiliated), Camp Seafarer for girls (YMCA affiliated), Camp Don Lee (Methodist), and Camp Caroline. Most of these camps have their largest programs in the summer months, but also hold other events throughout the year. For example, Camp Seafarer and Camp Seagull offer a Spring Break camp, Mother-Daughter weekends, and Father-Son weekends among others.

Opportunities for businesses in Arapahoe are plentiful. Business not currently available include the hotel industry, entertainment services, gas stations/convenience stores, and several others. As stated in an article from New Bern's Sun Journal, the hotel business opportunities lost from Arapahoe (and subsequently relished by New Bern) can be equated to millions of dollars during the camp season due to the high proportion of camp families, events, and visitors to the recreational opportunities.

== Geography ==
According to the United States Census Bureau, the town has a total area of 2.2 square miles (5.7 km^{2}), all land.

Arapahoe is located near the mouth of the Neuse River at Pamlico Sound. From Arapahoe (and through Minnesott Beach), the North Carolina Ferry System has a 20-minute ferry ride from Minnesott Beach to Cherry Branch. This ferry ride leads to Havelock, Atlantic Beach, Cherry Point Marine Corps Air Station, and Beaufort.

== Transportation ==
The major means for transportation in Arapahoe is by car. There are currently no taxi service, mass transportation, or airline service within the Araphoe geographic district. The closest airport to Arapahoe is Craven Regional Airport, serviced by American Airlines with eight times daily service to Charlotte. Delta Connection has service to Atlanta with twice daily service (three times daily summer service). Ferry service is also available from the North Carolina Ferry System with service from Minnesott Beach to Cherry Branch / Havelock every 20 minutes.

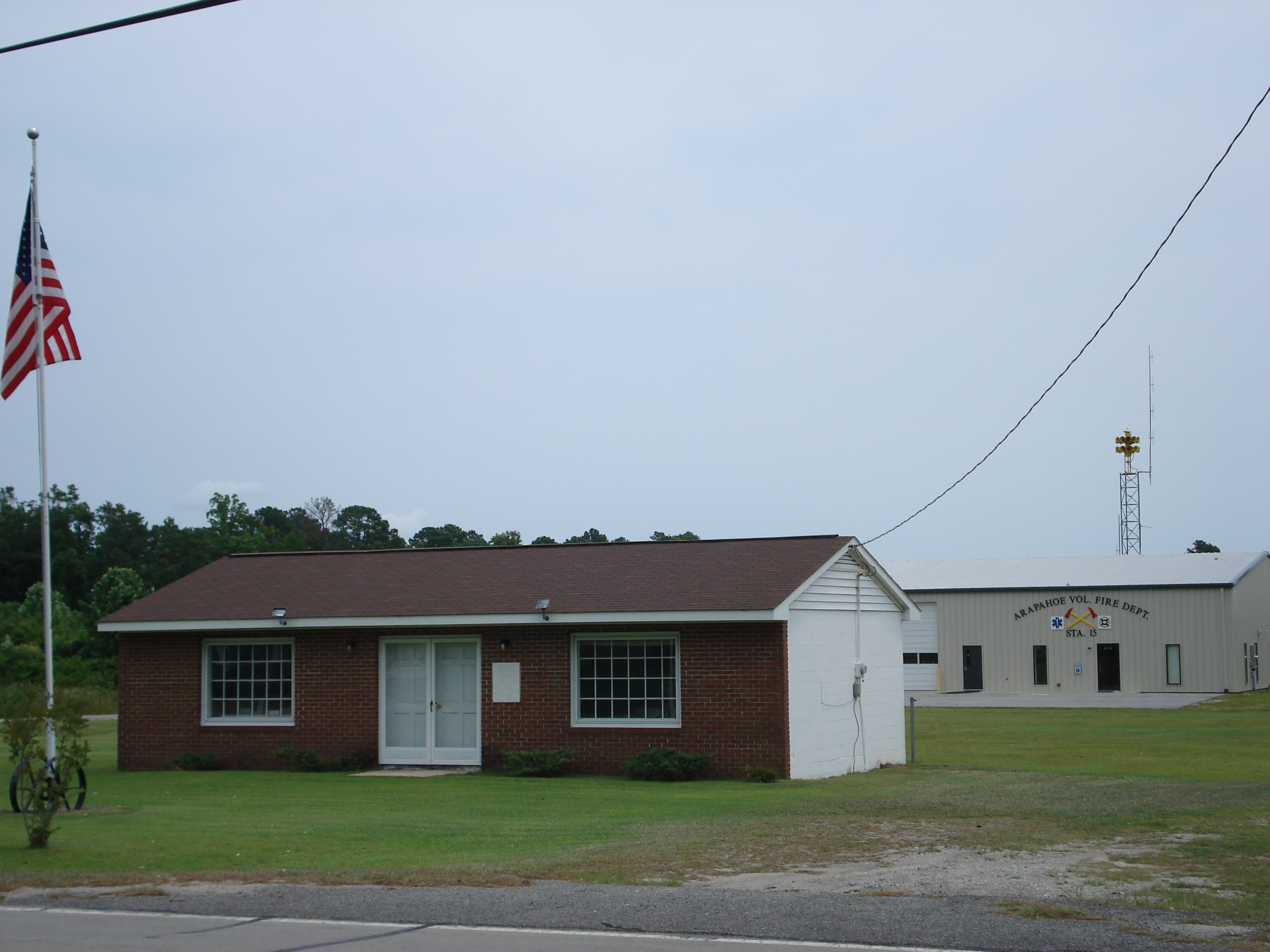
Arapahoe Town Hall and Fire Department

== Demographics ==
Historical population
Census	Pop.	Note	%±
1930	290		—
1940	307		5.9%
1950	273		−11.1%
1960	274		0.4%
1970	212		−22.6%
1980	467		120.3%
1990	430		−7.9%
2000	436		1.4%
2010	556		27.5%
2020	416		−25.2%
U.S. Decennial Census

As of the census of 2000, there were 436 people, 188 households, and 128 families residing in the town. The population density was 199.4 inhabitants per square mile (77.0/km^{2}). There were 214 housing units at an average density of 97.9 per square mile (37.8/km^{2}). The racial makeup of the town was 89.91% White, 6.19% African American, 0.23% Native American, 1.15% Asian, 2.52% from other races. Hispanic or Latino of any race were 5.50% of the population.

There were 188 households, out of which 26.6% had children under the age of 18 living with them, 54.8% were married couples living together, 9.6% had a female householder with no husband present, and 31.4% were non-families. 27.1% of all households were made up of individuals, and 16.0% had someone living alone who was 65 years of age or older. The average household size was 2.32 and the average family size was 2.75.

In the town, the population was spread out, with 20.6% under the age of 18, 6.9% from 18 to 24, 24.8% from 25 to 44, 31.0% from 45 to 64, and 16.7% who were 65 years of age or older. The median age was 42 years. For every 100 females, there were 98.2 males. For every 100 females age 18 and over, there were 102.3 males.

The median income for a household in the town was $32,813, and the median income for a family was $44,167. Males had a median income of $38,750 versus $25,179 for females. The per capita income for the town was $17,073. About 7.6% of families and 10.9% of the population were below the poverty line, including 21.0% of those under age 18 and 1.7% of those age 65 or over. Arapahoe currently has a tax rate of $0.05/$100.

== New developments ==
New Developments in Arapahoe include the following:

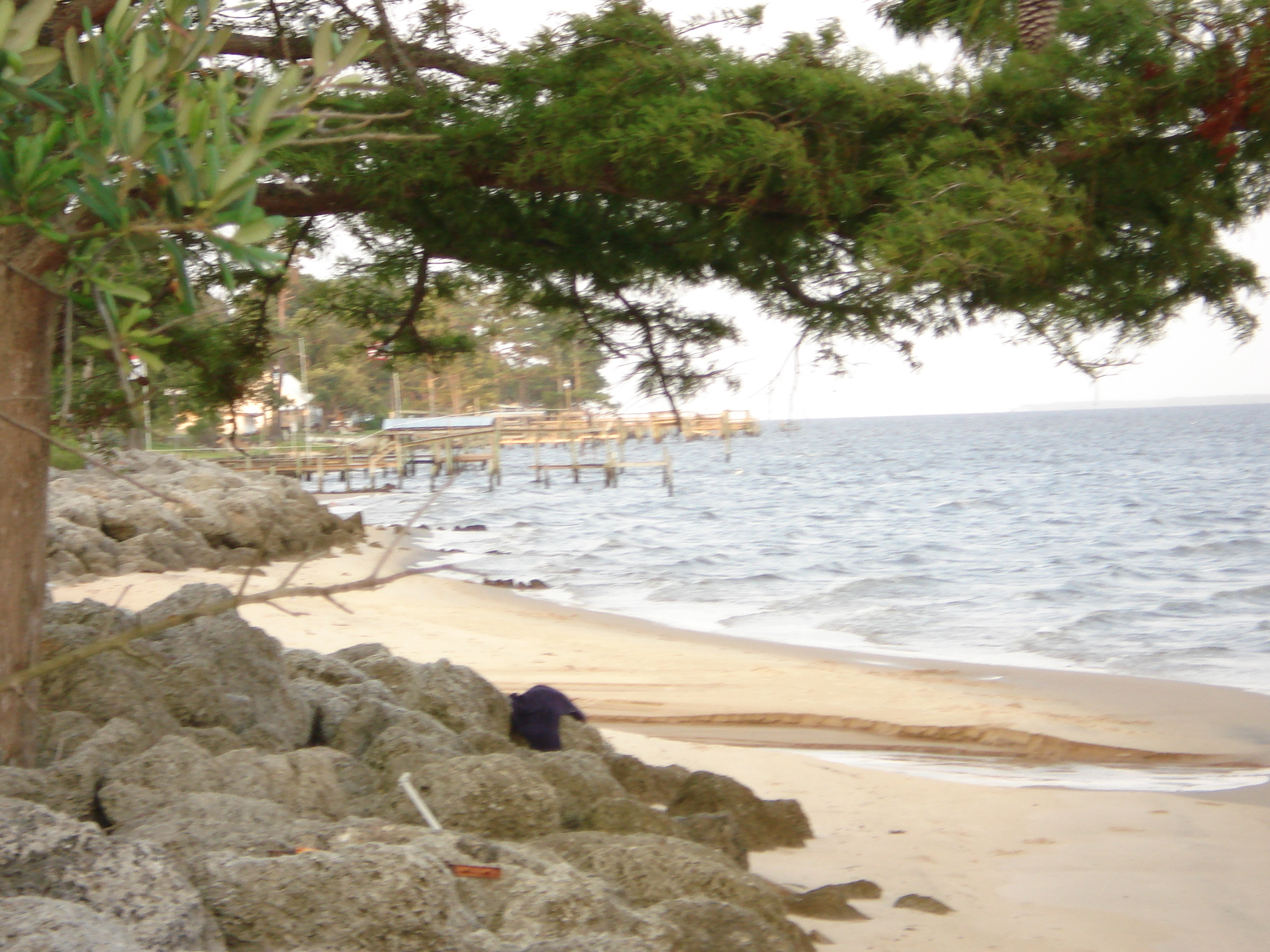
Neuse River in Arapahoe near Camp Don Lee

1. Shareheart Community developments along the Neuse River and Dawsons Creek. These developments are private, small communities built on the comforts that the Neuse River can provide.
2. A new housing community located at Dawson's Creek called Shine Landing. This development contains 96 lots with several being waterfront. This development is currently selling and nearly sold out.
3. A new housing community located at Dawson's Creek called Dawsons Landing. This development is currently in pre-sale with over 100 lots available.
4. A new housing community located on Hwy 306S in Arapahoe. The development, called Arlington Place, is located on the Burts Farm Development and will contain as many as 1200 homes, boat docks, and a community center. Currently Phase 1 of Arlington Place has been sold to the 80% mark.
5. A water path has been developed for kayakers and paddlers to traverse the rivers, streams, and sounds of Pamlico County. Pamlico Paddle recently announced a fall event on October 20, 2007, where paddlers enjoy the paddle paths around Pamlico County. During the 2005 event, over 75 paddlers joined the event.
6. A Medical and Retail center is being developed at the old Arapahoe Elementary School building.
7. Other current developments include a gas/convenience store and a hotel in Minnesott Beach.
8. A new residential community located on Baird Creek (also known as Beards Creek) called Baird Creek Point. This development has approximately 40 home sites including waterfront and interior lots, a ten slip community marina and a community center. Most waterfront lots are currently sold.
9. The largest of developments in the area is called Dawson Creek Subdivision with over 200 lots sold with many waterfront lots under construction. The development has a pool, clubhouse as well as plans for a private members dock and launch ramp in the future.
