= Currituck County Schools =

School district in North Carolina, USA

Location
- Currituck County, North Carolina United States

District information
- Type: Public
- Grades: PK–12
- Superintendent: Dr. Matt Lutz
- Asst. superintendent(s): Renee Dowdy
- Schools: 10
- Budget: $ 41,060,000
- NCES District ID: 3701080

Students and staff
- Students: 3,979
- Teachers: 249.93 (on FTE basis)
- Staff: 336.66 (on FTE basis)
- Student–teacher ratio: 15.92:1

Other information
- Website: www.currituck.k12.nc.us

Currituck County Schools is a PK–12 graded school district serving Currituck County, North Carolina. Its ten schools serve 3,979 students as of the 2010–11 school year.

== Student demographics ==
For the 2010–11 school year, Currituck County Schools had a total population of 3,979 students and 249.93 teachers on a (FTE) basis. This produced a student-teacher ratio of 1592:1. That same year, out of the student total, the gender ratio was 51% male to 49% female. The demographic group makeup was: White, 78%; Black, 5%; Hispanic, 4%; American Indian, 0%; and Asian/Pacific Islander, 0% (two or more races: 13%). For the same school year, 35.06% of the students received free and reduced-cost lunches.

== Governance ==
The primary governing body of Currituck County Schools follows a council–manager government format with a five-member Board of Education appointing a Superintendent to run the day-to-day operations of the system. The school system resides in the North Carolina State Board of Education's First District.

=== Board of Education ===
The five members of the Board of Education generally meet on the third Thursday of each month. As of January 2025, the members of the board are Dana Parker (Chairman), Jason Banks (Vice Chairman), Sandi Ayres, Emily Crodick, and Melissa Harrison.

=== Superintendent ===
The superintendent of the system is Dr. Matt Lutz. He began in August 2020, replacing the former superintendent Mark Stefanik who resigned to take a position with Tipp County Schools in Ohio.

== Member schools ==
Currituck County Schools has ten schools ranging from pre-kindergarten to twelfth grade. Those ten schools are separated into one early college, one high school, two middle schools, six elementary schools.

=== High schools ===
- Currituck County High School (Barco)
- J. P. Knapp Early College (Currituck)

=== Middle schools ===
- Currituck County Middle School (Barco)
- Moyock Middle School (Moyock)

=== Elementary schools ===
- Central Elementary School (Barco)
- Jarvisburg Elementary School (Jarvisburg)
- Knotts Island Elementary School (Knotts Island)
- Moyock Elementary School (Moyock)
- Shawboro Elementary School (Shawboro)
- W. T. Griggs Elementary (Poplar Branch)

== Athletics ==
According to the North Carolina High School Athletic Association, for the 2012–2013 school year:

- Currituck County High is a 2A school in the Northeastern Coastal Conference.
- J. P. Knapp Early College does not have athletic teams.

== See also ==
- List of school districts in North Carolina
