= North Carolina Highway 168 =

State highway in Currituck County, North Carolina, US

North Carolina Highway 168
- Caratoke Highway

Route information
- Maintained by NCDOT
- Length: 9.2 mi (14.8 km)

Major junctions
- South end: US 158 in Barco
- NC 615 / Currituck–Knotts Island Ferry in Currituck; NC 34 in Sligo
- North end: SR 168 at the Virginia state line in Moyock

Location
- Country: United States
- State: North Carolina
- Counties: Currituck

Highway system
- North Carolina Highway System; Interstate; US; State; Scenic
← NC 163	→ NC 171

North Carolina Highway 168 (NC 168) is a primary state highway in the U.S. state of North Carolina. Known as Caratoke Highway, the state highway runs 18.28 miles (29.42 km) from US 158 in Barco north to the Virginia state line in Moyock, where the highway continues as Virginia State Route 168 (SR 168) toward Norfolk, Virginia. NC 168 forms part of the primary north–south highway of Currituck County, where it provides access to the county seat of Currituck. The state highway also provides a crucial link for traffic between the Hampton Roads region of Virginia and the Outer Banks.

== Route description ==
NC 168 begins at an intersection with US 158 in Barco along Coinjock Bay. US 158 continues south along Caratoke Highway toward Nags Head and west on Shortcut Road toward Currituck County Airport and Elizabeth City. NC 168 heads north as a five-lane road (two travel lanes in each direction with a center turn lane) to Currituck, where the highway serves some county offices and has a pair of intersections with SR 1242 (Courthouse Road) on the south and NC 615 on the north. NC 615 provides access to a ferry just east of its terminus to cross Currituck Sound to Knotts Island. NC 168 curves west and crosses two of Tull Creek's tributaries before meeting the northern end of NC 34 (Shawboro Road) at Sligo. The state highway continues northwest parallel to the Chesapeake and Albemarle Railroad, which the highway crosses in Moyock. The highway passes east of the Currituck Welcome Center before reaching its northern terminus at the Virginia state line. The roadway continues as SR 168 (Chesapeake Expressway), which becomes a freeway while passing through Chesapeake, Virginia on its way to Norfolk.

== Major intersections ==
The entire route is in Currituck County.

Location	mi	km	Destinations	Notes
Barco	0.00	0.00	US 158 (Caratoke Highway/Shortcut Road) – Nags Head, Elizabeth City	
Currituck	5.25	8.45	NC 615 north (Courthouse Road) – Knotts Island	Southern terminus of NC 615; access to Currituck-Knotts Island Ferry
Sligo	8.49	13.66	NC 34 south (Shawboro Road) – Shawboro	Northern terminus of NC 34
Moyock	18.28	29.42	SR 168 north (Chesapeake Expressway) – Norfolk	Virginia state line
1.000 mi = 1.609 km; 1.000 km = 0.621 mi
