= ONX =

ONX may refer to:

- Enrique Adolfo Jiménez Airport (IATA: ONX) in Colón, Panama
- Currituck County Regional Airport (FAA: ONX) in Currituck County, North Carolina, United States
- onX Maps, web mapping platform
