= Dan Antolik =

American football coach

Playing career
- 1965–1968: Fort Lewis

Coaching career (HC unless noted)
- 1970–1971: Mancos HS (CO)
- 1972–1975: Fort Lewis (assistant)
- 1976–1978: New Mexico Highlands
- 1979–1980: Salem (DC)
- 1981: Currituck HS (NC)
- 1982–1985: Saint Paul's (VA)
- 1986–1991: Bridgewater
- 1992–1994: New Mexico Military (assistant)
- 1995: Hampton (assistant)
- 1996–1999: Lafayette HS (VA)
- 2000–2016: Christopher Newport (OL/AHC)
- 2017–2019: Nebraska–Kearney (OL)
- 2022–?: Christopher Newport (OL)

Head coaching record
- Overall: 50–90–2 (college)

Dan Antolik is an American football coach. He was the offensive line coach at Christopher Newport University in Newport News, Virginia. Antolik served as the head football coach at New Mexico Highlands University in Las Vegas, New Mexico from 1976 to 1978, Saint Paul's College in Lawrenceville, Virginia from 1982 to 1986, and Bridgewater College in Bridgewater, Virginia, from 1986 to 1991, compiling a career college football head coaching record of 50–90–2. Antolik was the offensive line coach at University of Nebraska–Kearney from 2017 to 2019. He retired after the 2019 season, but returned to coaching in 2022.

Antolik also served as the head coach at Lafayette High School in Virginia Mancos High School in Colorado, and Currituck High School in North Carolina.

== Head coaching record ==
=== College ===
Year	Team	Overall	Conference	Standing	Bowl/playoffs
New Mexico Highlands Cowboys (Rocky Mountain Athletic Conference) (1976–1978)
1976	New Mexico Highlands	1–8	1–7	10th	
1977	New Mexico Highlands	2–8	2–7	T–7th	
1978	New Mexico Highlands	1–9	1–7	9th	
New Mexico Highlands:		4–25	4–21		
Saint Paul's Tigers (Central Intercollegiate Athletic Association) (1982–1985)
1982	Saint Paul's	2–8	0–7	6th (Northern)	
1983	Saint Paul's	7–3	4–3	T–2nd (Northern)	
1984	Saint Paul's	3–7	0–7	6th (Northern)	
1985	Saint Paul's	2–8	0–7	6th (Northern)	
Saint Paul's:		14–26	4–24		
Bridgewater Eagles (Old Dominion Athletic Conference) (1986–1991)
1986	Bridgewater	2–6–1	1–4	T–4th	
1987	Bridgewater	4–6	1–4	T–4th	
1988	Bridgewater	3–6–1	1–3	5th	
1989	Bridgewater	4–6	1–3	T–4th	
1990	Bridgewater	3–7	1–3	T–4th	
1991	Bridgewater	2–8	1–4	5th	
Bridgewater:		18–39–2	6–21		
Total:		50–90–2			
