= Currituck County, North Carolina =

County in North Carolina, United States

- County
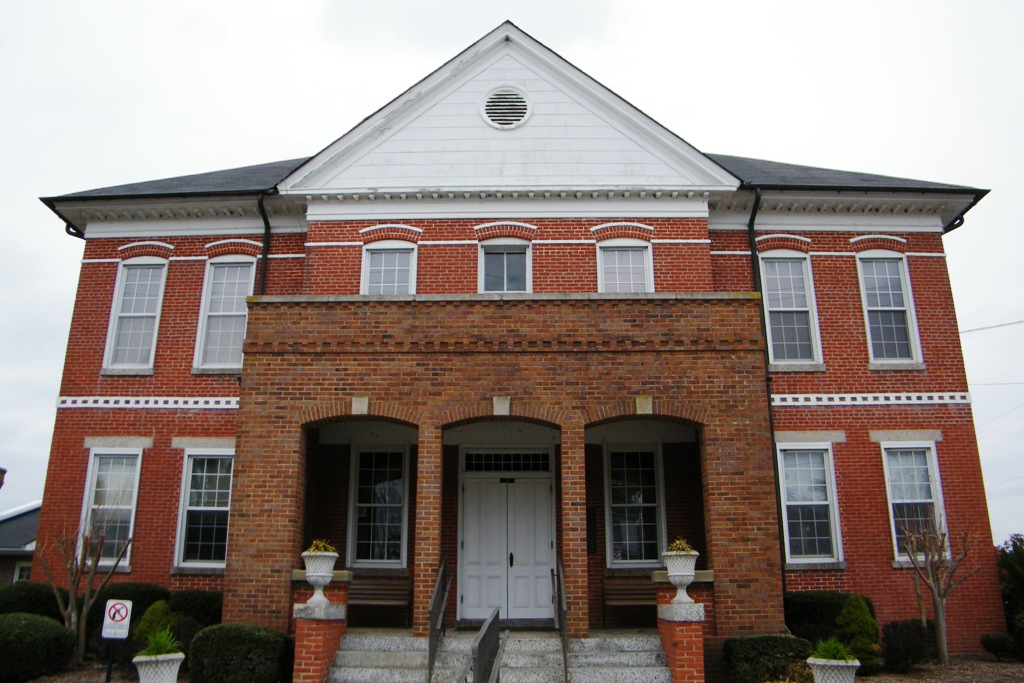
- Currituck County Courthouse

- Flag Seal

- Location within the U.S. state of North Carolina
- Interactive map of Currituck County, North Carolina
- Coordinates: 36.37°N 75.94°W
- Country: United States
- State: North Carolina
- Founded: 1668
- Named for: Algonquin term meaning "The Land of the Wild Geese"
- Seat: Currituck
- Largest community: Moyock

Area
  - Total: 526.43 sq mi (1,363.4 km^{2})
  - Land: 261.91 sq mi (678.3 km^{2})
  - Water: 264.52 sq mi (685.1 km^{2}) 50.25%

Population (2020)
  - Total: 28,100
  - Estimate (2025): 33,158 ▲
  - Density: 107.29/sq mi (41.42/km^{2})
- Time zone: UTC−5 (Eastern)
  - Summer (DST): UTC−4 (EDT)
- Congressional district: 1st
- Website: currituckcountync.gov

Currituck County (/ˈkʊrɪtʌk/) is a county located in the U.S. state of North Carolina. It is the northeasternmost county in the state. As of the 2020 census, the population was 28,100. Its county seat is Currituck. The county was formed in 1668 as a precinct of Albemarle County and later gained county status in 1739. The name is "traditionally said to be an indigenous word for wild geese; Coratank." Currituck County is included in the Virginia Beach-Chesapeake, VA-NC Combined Statistical Area. It is in the northeastern section of the state and is bounded by the Atlantic Ocean, Currituck Sound, Camden County, Dare County and the Commonwealth of Virginia. Currituck Court House, mentioned as early as 1755, was the name of the county seat. Today the words "Court House" have been dropped and only Currituck is used as the community name.

== History ==
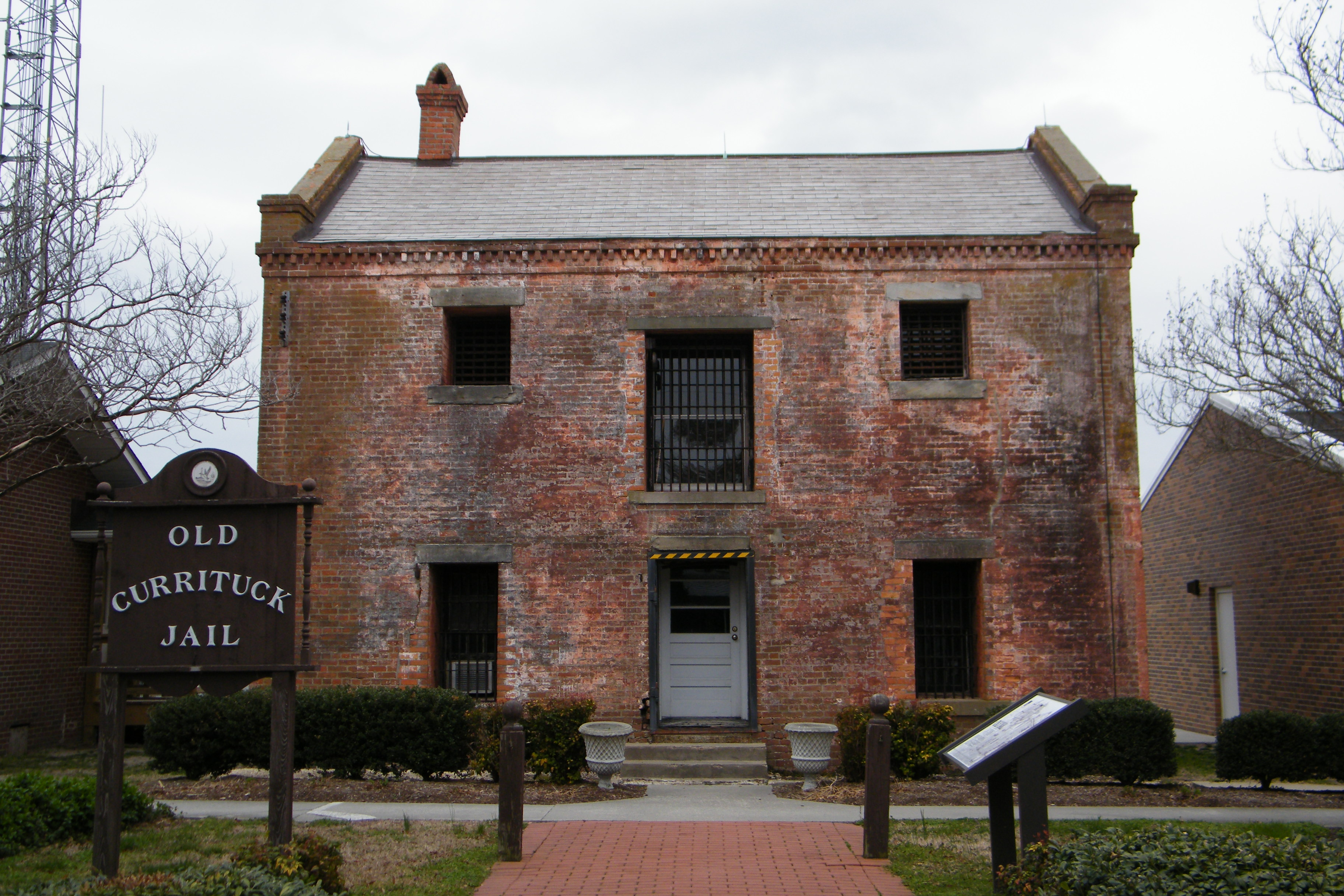
The Old Currituck County Courthouse and Jail in Currituck

Currituck County was created in 1668 from Albemarle County. The largest community is Moyock, with a current population of 5,670, and the county seat is Currituck.

== Geography ==
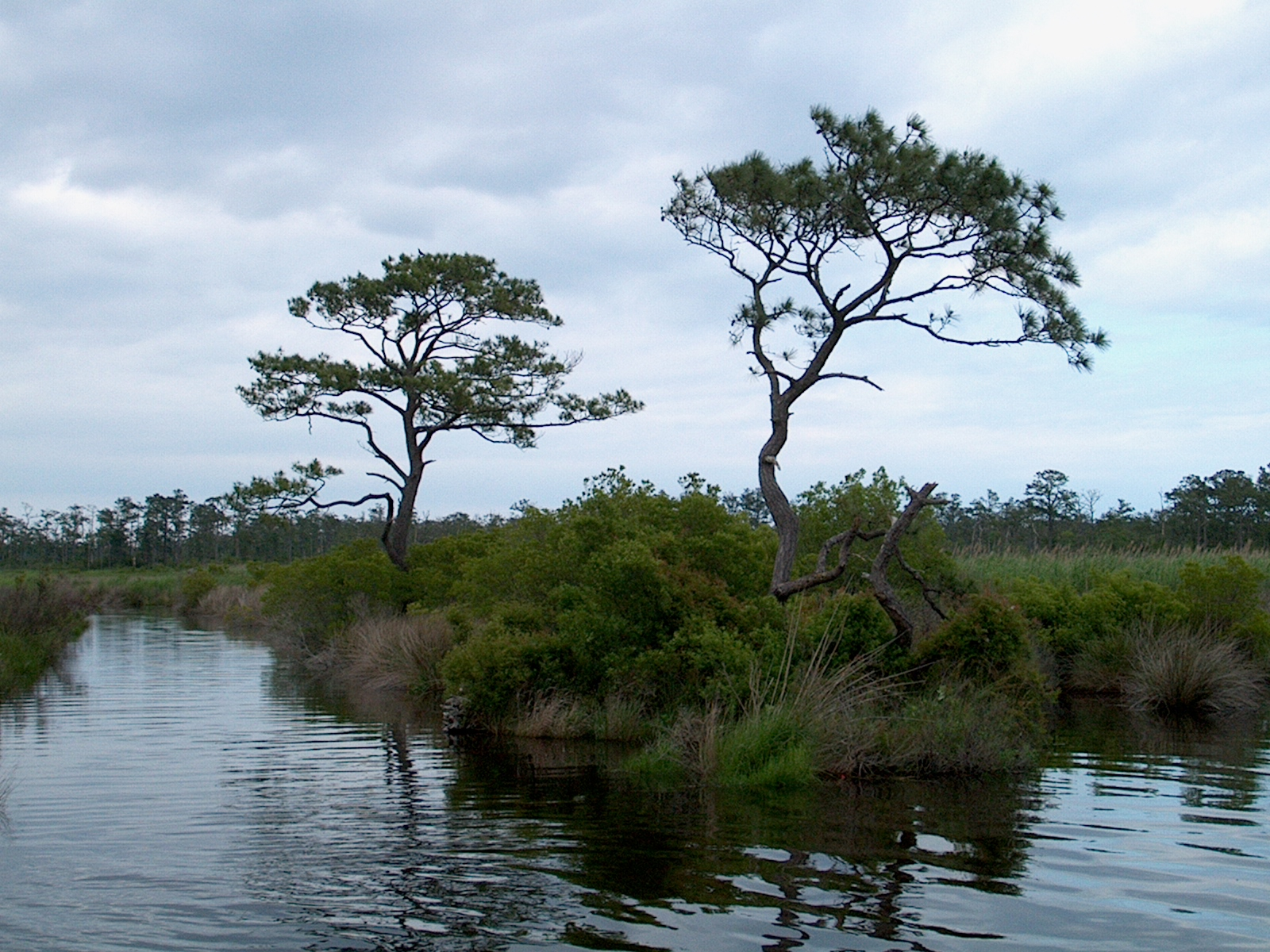
Pine trees in Mackay Island National Wildlife Refuge. Pine trees are common in Currituck County.

According to the U.S. Census Bureau, the county has a total area of 526.43 square miles (1,363.4 km^{2}), of which 261.91 square miles (678.3 km^{2}) is land and 264.52 square miles (685.1 km^{2}) (50.25%) is water.

Currituck County includes the northern communities of North Carolina's Outer Banks, separated from mainland Currituck County by the Currituck Sound.

=== National protected areas ===
- Currituck National Wildlife Refuge
- Mackay Island National Wildlife Refuge (part)

=== State and local protected areas/sites ===
- Currituck Banks Estuarine Reserve Dedicated Nature Preserve
- Currituck Banks Game Land
- Currituck Banks Reserve
- Currituck Beach Lighthouse
- Currituck Outer Banks Preserve Dedicated Nature Preserve
- Mackay Island National Wildlife Refuge (part)
- Monkey Island
- North River Game Land (part)
- Northwest River Marsh Game Land

=== Major water bodies ===
- Albemarle Sound
- Atlantic Ocean (North Atlantic Ocean)
- Currituck Sound
- Intracoastal Waterway
- North River
- Northwest River

=== Adjacent counties ===
- City of Chesapeake, Virginia – north
- City of Virginia Beach, Virginia – north
- Dare County – south
- Tyrrell County – southwest
- Camden County – southwest

=== Major highways ===
- US 158
- NC 12
- NC 34
- NC 136
- NC 168
- NC 615

=== Major infrastructure ===
- Currituck County Regional Airport
- Knotts Island–Currituck Ferry

== Demographics ==
Historical population
Census	Pop.	Note	%±
1790	5,220		—
1800	6,928		32.7%
1810	6,985		0.8%
1820	8,098		15.9%
1830	7,655		−5.5%
1840	6,703		−12.4%
1850	7,236		8.0%
1860	7,415		2.5%
1870	5,131		−30.8%
1880	6,476		26.2%
1890	6,747		4.2%
1900	6,529		−3.2%
1910	7,693		17.8%
1920	7,268		−5.5%
1930	6,710		−7.7%
1940	6,709		0.0%
1950	6,201		−7.6%
1960	6,601		6.5%
1970	6,976		5.7%
1980	11,089		59.0%
1990	13,736		23.9%
2000	18,190		32.4%
2010	23,547		29.5%
2020	28,100		19.3%
2025 (est.)	33,158	▲	18.0%
U.S. Decennial Census; 2010–2020

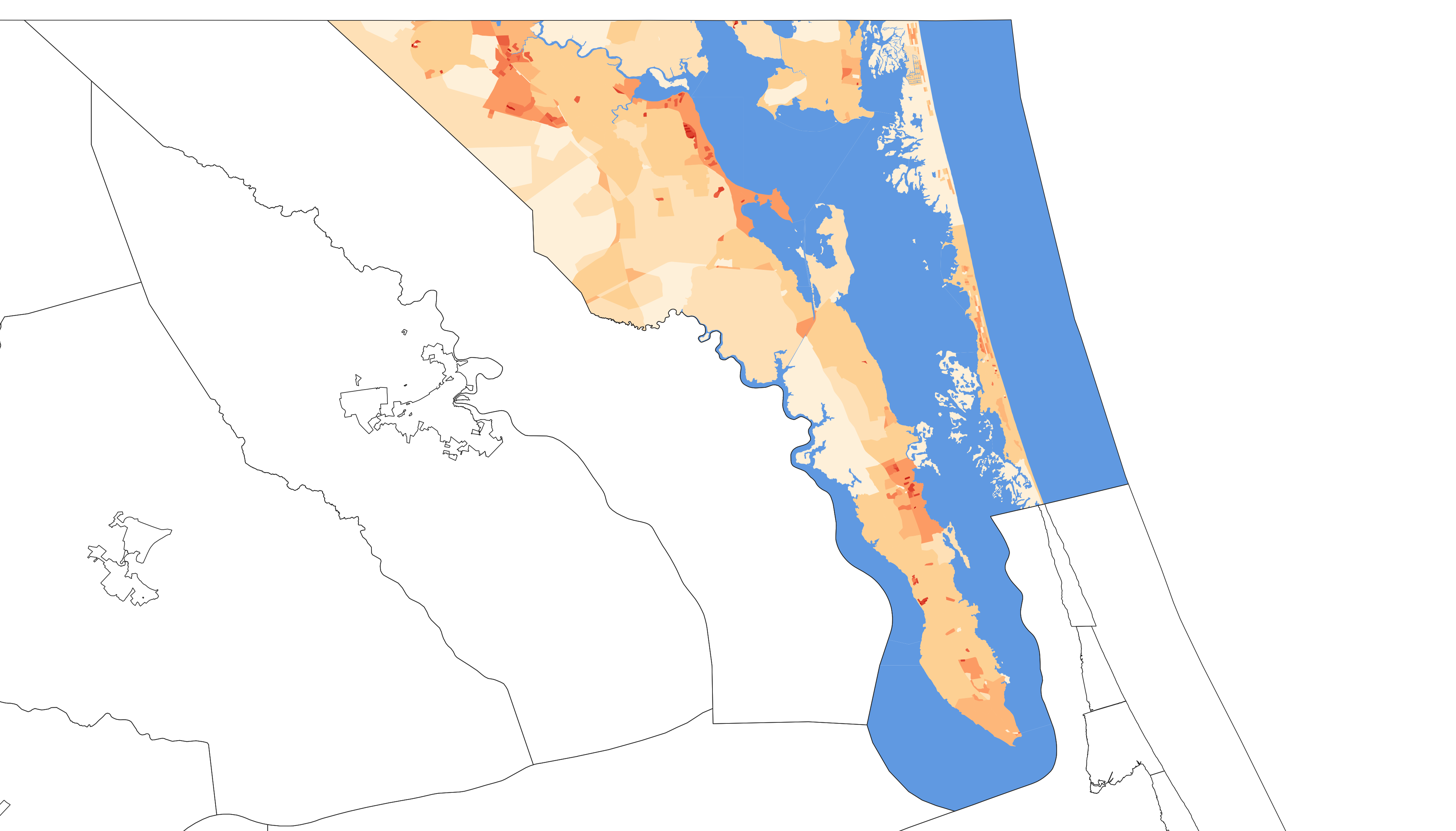
2020 population density of Currituck County NC by census block

=== 2020 census ===
Currituck County, North Carolina – Racial and ethnic composition Note: the US Census treats Hispanic/Latino as an ethnic category. This table excludes Latinos from the racial categories and assigns them to a separate category. Hispanics/Latinos may be of any race.
Race / Ethnicity (NH = Non-Hispanic)	Pop 1980	Pop 1990	Pop 2000	Pop 2010	Pop 2020	% 1980	% 1990	% 2000	% 2010	% 2020
White alone (NH)	9,201	11,965	16,287	20,876	23,505	82.97%	87.11%	89.54%	88.66%	83.65%
Black or African American alone (NH)	1,732	1,542	1,314	1,348	1,377	15.62%	11.23%	7.22%	5.72%	4.90%
Native American or Alaska Native alone (NH)	26	65	74	103	98	0.23%	0.47%	0.41%	0.44%	0.35%
Asian alone (NH)	25	51	68	141	265	0.23%	0.37%	0.37%	0.60%	0.94%
Native Hawaiian or Pacific Islander alone (NH)	x	x	6	10	22	x	x	0.03%	0.04%	0.08%
Other race alone (NH)	10	3	26	16	109	0.09%	0.02%	0.14%	0.07%	0.39%
Mixed race or Multiracial (NH)	x	x	154	349	1,506	x	x	0.85%	1.48%	5.36%
Hispanic or Latino (any race)	95	110	261	704	1,218	0.86%	0.80%	1.43%	2.99%	4.33%
Total	11,089	13,736	18,190	23,547	28,100	100.00%	100.00%	100.00%	100.00%	100.00%

As of the 2020 census, there were 28,100 people and 7,467 families residing in the county. The median age was 43.4 years; 21.7% of residents were under the age of 18 and 17.8% of residents were 65 years of age or older. For every 100 females there were 99.1 males, and for every 100 females age 18 and over there were 98.4 males age 18 and over.

The racial makeup of the county was 85.0% White, 5.0% Black or African American, 0.4% American Indian and Alaska Native, 1.0% Asian, 0.1% Native Hawaiian and Pacific Islander, 1.4% from some other race, and 7.1% from two or more races. Hispanic or Latino residents of any race comprised 4.3% of the population.

4.1% of residents lived in urban areas, while 95.9% lived in rural areas.

There were 10,723 households in the county, of which 32.4% had children under the age of 18 living in them. Of all households, 60.1% were married-couple households, 14.8% were households with a male householder and no spouse or partner present, and 18.4% were households with a female householder and no spouse or partner present. About 19.4% of all households were made up of individuals and 8.7% had someone living alone who was 65 years of age or older.

There were 15,989 housing units, of which 32.9% were vacant. Among occupied housing units, 83.9% were owner-occupied and 16.1% were renter-occupied. The homeowner vacancy rate was 1.6% and the rental vacancy rate was 15.7%.

=== 2010 census ===
At the 2010 census, there were 23,547 people, 6,902 households, and 5,204 families residing in the county. The population density was 70 people per square mile (27 people/km^{2}). There were 10,687 housing units at an average density of 41 units per square mile (16 units/km^{2}). The racial makeup of the county was 90.3% White, 5.8% Black or African American, 0.5% Native American, 0.6% Asian, 0.0% Pacific Islander, 0.9% from other races, and 1.8% from two or more races. 3.0% of the population were Hispanics or Latinos of any race.

There were 6,902 households, out of which 33.60% had children under the age of 18 living with them, 61.60% were married couples living together, 9.20% had a female householder with no husband present, and 24.60% were non-families. 19.40% of all households were made up of individuals, and 7.60% had someone living alone who was 65 years of age or older. The average household size was 2.61 and the average family size was 2.98.

The age distribution was 25.30% under the age of 18, 6.70% from 18 to 24, 30.50% from 25 to 44, 25.40% from 45 to 64, and 12.00% who were 65 years of age or older. The median age was 38 years. For every 100 females there were 98.60 males. For every 100 females age 18 and over, there were 97.50 males.

The median income for a household in the county was $40,822, and the median income for a family was $46,382. Males had a median income of $32,619 versus $22,641 for females. The per capita income for the county was $19,908. 10.70% of the population and 8.90% of families were below the poverty line. Out of the total people living in poverty, 16.10% are under the age of 18 and 8.90% are 65 or older.

== Government and politics ==
Politically Currituck is a typical "Solid South" county. It voted more than eighty percent for every Democratic candidate between 1920 and 1948. Currituck never voted Republican until, after voting for American Independent George Wallace in 1968, turning decisively to Richard Nixon in 1972. Since then, Currituck has become a powerfully Republican county. The last Democrat to carry Currituck has been Jimmy Carter in 1980, and at the 2016 election Hillary Clinton received less than a quarter of the county's vote.

The county is run by elected county commissioners, and Currituck County is a member of the Albemarle Commission regional council of governments. Currituck has recently paced all other counties in growth throughout North Carolina, as commuters from the Hampton Roads metro of Virginia as well as work-from-home employees have flocked to the county. The Currituck County Board of Commissioners placed a moratorium on solar farms in February 2017, but have since rescinded it with two new solar projects in the works as of 2023.

United States presidential election results for Currituck County, North Carolina
Year	Republican		Democratic		Third party(ies)	
Year	No.	%	No.	%	No.	%
1912	6	0.94%	622	97.80%	8	1.26%
1916	87	8.42%	945	91.48%	1	0.10%
1920	86	7.92%	1,000	92.08%	0	0.00%
1924	52	7.07%	670	91.16%	13	1.77%
1928	166	11.70%	1,253	88.30%	0	0.00%
1932	69	3.77%	1,759	96.02%	4	0.22%
1936	128	7.30%	1,625	92.70%	0	0.00%
1940	102	6.24%	1,532	93.76%	0	0.00%
1944	231	18.05%	1,049	81.95%	0	0.00%
1948	130	9.50%	1,144	83.63%	94	6.87%
1952	414	21.96%	1,471	78.04%	0	0.00%
1956	488	25.51%	1,425	74.49%	0	0.00%
1960	464	21.94%	1,651	78.06%	0	0.00%
1964	741	33.74%	1,455	66.26%	0	0.00%
1968	363	14.11%	738	28.69%	1,471	57.19%
1972	1,578	66.67%	718	30.33%	71	3.00%
1976	954	32.12%	1,999	67.31%	17	0.57%
1980	1,668	44.06%	1,980	52.30%	138	3.65%
1984	2,885	63.24%	1,668	36.56%	9	0.20%
1988	2,443	60.98%	1,555	38.82%	8	0.20%
1992	2,188	41.31%	1,935	36.53%	1,174	22.16%
1996	2,569	45.51%	2,277	40.34%	799	14.15%
2000	4,095	60.77%	2,595	38.51%	49	0.73%
2004	6,013	66.99%	2,909	32.41%	54	0.60%
2008	7,234	65.16%	3,737	33.66%	131	1.18%
2012	7,496	66.31%	3,562	31.51%	246	2.18%
2016	9,163	72.33%	2,913	22.99%	593	4.68%
2020	11,657	72.19%	4,195	25.98%	295	1.83%
2024	13,235	73.31%	4,604	25.50%	214	1.19%

== Education ==
Currituck County Schools are governed by a five-member, elected Board of Education. The following schools are located in the county:

- Central Elementary School
- Currituck County High School
- Currituck County Middle School
- J.P. Knapp Early College High School
- Jarvisburg Elementary School
- Knotts Island Elementary School
- Moyock Elementary School
- Moyock Middle School
- Shawboro Elementary School
- W.T. Griggs Elementary School
- Jarvisburg Christian Academy

== Communities ==
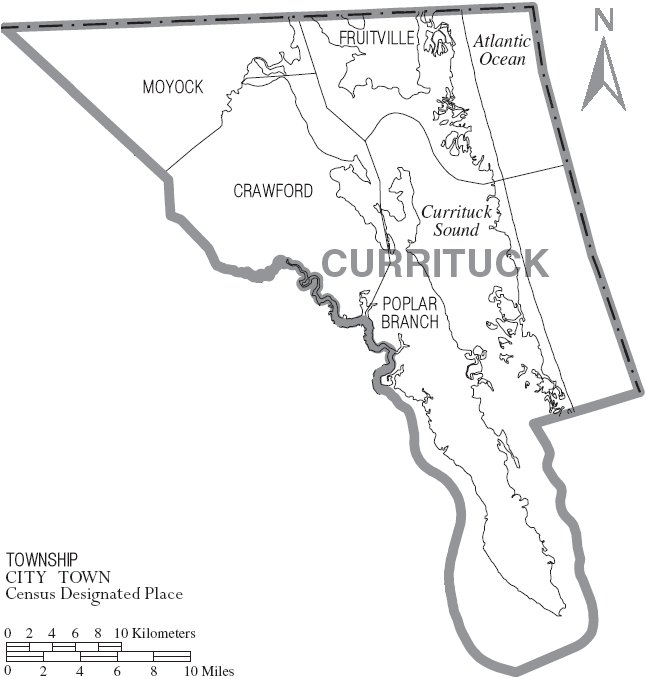
Map of Currituck County with municipal and township labels

=== Census-designated places ===
- Coinjock
- Grandy
- Moyock (largest community)

=== Townships ===
- Crawford
- Fruitville
- Moyock
- Poplar Branch

=== Other unincorporated communities ===
- Aydlett
- Barco
- Carova Beach
- Corolla
- Currituck (county seat)
- Gibbs Woods
- Gregory
- Harbinger
- Knotts Island
- Jarvisburg
- Mamie
- Maple
- North Swan Beach
- Point Harbor
- Poplar Beach
- Poplar Branch
- Powells Point
- Swan Beach
- Shawboro
- Sligo
- Spot
- Waterlily

== Notable people ==
- Dennis Anderson, former driver, and creator, of the Grave Digger monster truck
- Linda Carter Brinson, American journalist
- Macon Brock, founder of Dollar Tree had a beach house in the Corolla community
- Richard Thurmond Chatham, once owned the hunt club Dews Island in Jarvisburg
- Emerson Etheridge, congressman and Southern Unionist
- John Gibbs, leader of colonial rebellion, Gibbs Rebellion, and name sake of Gibbs Woods, NC
- Thomas Jarvis, Colonial Governor of North Carolina
- Thomas Jordan Jarvis, Governor of North Carolina
- Joseph P. Knapp, publisher, philanthropist and namesake of the J.P. Knapp Early College High School
- Antonin Scalia, Supreme Court Justice, had a beach house in the Corolla community
- Henry Marchmore Shaw, Congressman and Confederate officer

== See also ==
- List of counties in North Carolina
- National Register of Historic Places listings in Currituck County, North Carolina
- Mid-Currituck Bridge, proposed bridge to connect the mainland to Corolla
