= Currituck County High School =

American public school in North Carolina

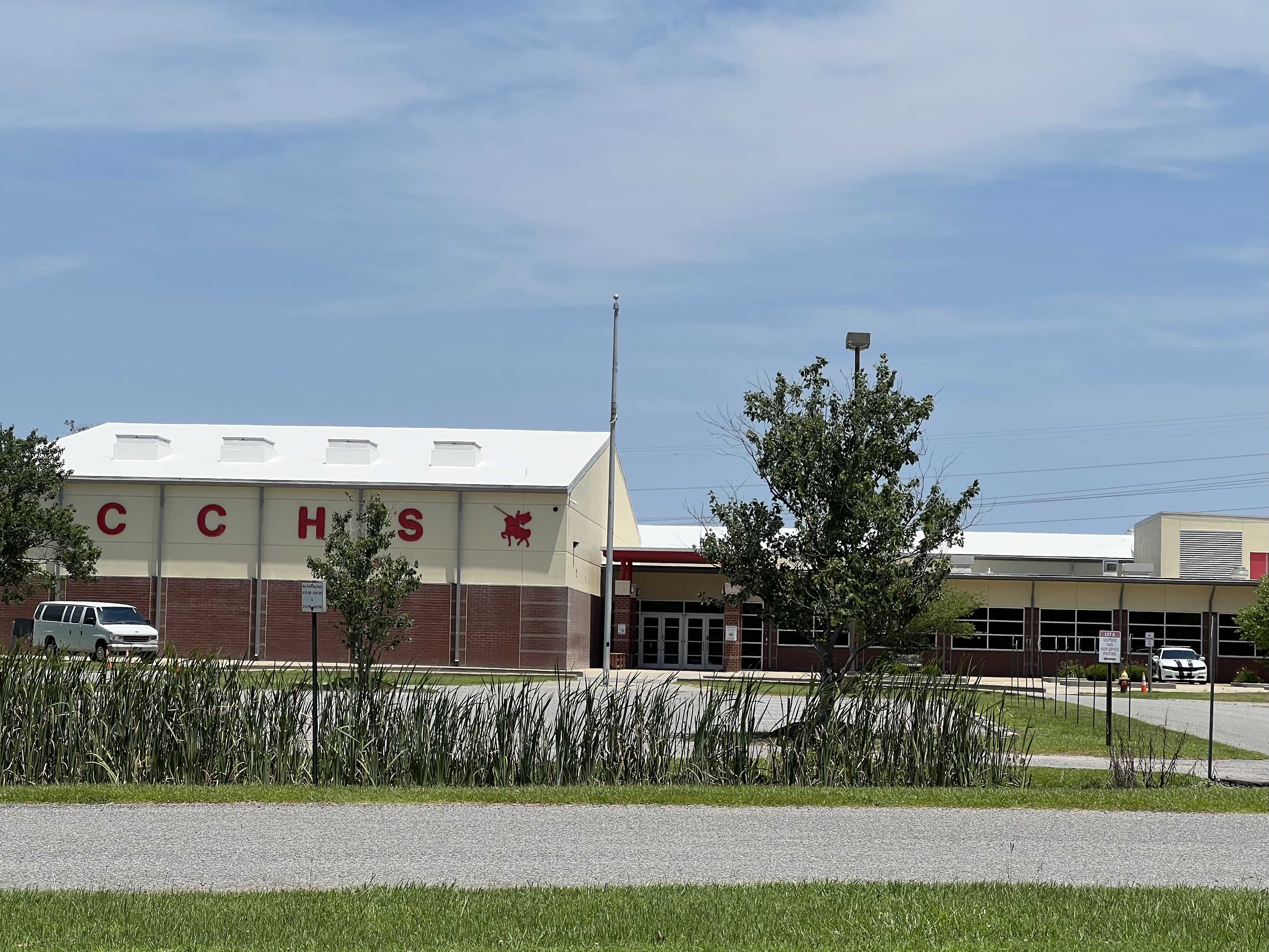

Location
- 4203 Caratoke Hwy; Barco, North Carolina 27917; United States; 36°22′23″N 75°58′09″W

Information
- Type: Public
- Established: 1976
- School district: Currituck County Schools
- CEEB code: 340963
- Principal: Helen Taylor
- Teaching staff: 43.03 (FTE)
- Enrollment: 1,061 (2024-2025)
- Student to teacher ratio: 24.66
- Colors: Red, white, and black
- Team name: Knights
- Rival: First Flight High School Camden County High School
- Website: cchs.currituck.k12.nc.us

Currituck County High School is a public high school located in Barco, North Carolina. It serves all of Currituck County including Knotts Island and Corolla.

== History ==
Currituck County High School opened for the 1976–77 school year, replacing J.P. Knapp High School which simultaneously became a junior high school.

The current high school building opened for the 1998–99 school year and is located next door to the original 1976 building which is now Currituck County Middle School.

== Athletics ==
Currituck County High School athletics teams compete in the Northeastern Coastal Conference. Currituck County's colors are red, black, and white and their mascot is the knight. Currituck County offers the following sports programs:

Fall sports	Winter sports	Spring sports
Football	Boys basketball	Boys baseball
Boys soccer	Girls basketball	Girls soccer
Girls volleyball	Girls bowling	Girls softball
Girls cross county	Boys Wrestling	Boys tennis
Boys cross country	Girls Wrestling	Boys track & field
Girls tennis	Boys swimming	Girls track & field
Girls golf	Girls swimming	Boys golf
	Boys indoor track	
	Girls indoor track	

=== State championships ===
- Boys basketball
  - 1986 1A NCHSAA State Champions, won the first high school basketball championship that was played in the Dean E. Smith Center at the University of North Carolina at Chapel Hill
- Softball
  - 1991 1A NCHSAA State Champions
  - 1993 1A NCHSAA State Champions
- Girls volleyball
  - 2018 2A NCHSAA State Champions
- Cheerleading
  - 2019 NCHSAA State Champions

== Academics ==
Currituck County High School offers AP courses in the sciences, english, histories, and arts. This catalog also includes the AP Capstone program. Any AP course not listed within the course catalog is able to be taken through North Carolina Virtual Public School (NCVPS). CCHS does not offer an International Baccalaureate (IB) curriculum.

=== Rankings ===
Currituck County High School ranks #10,597 among ~18,000 high schools in the United States. CCHS also ranks #364 among 576 eligible high schools in North Carolina.
