= College of The Albemarle =

College in North Carolina, United States

Coordinates: 36.3249°N 76.2202°W

- Other name: COA
- Motto: Transform Your Tomorrow
- Type: Public community college
- Established: 1960
- Parent institution: North Carolina Community College System
- Students: 2,100 (approx.)
- Location: Elizabeth City, Manteo, Currituck and Edenton, North Carolina, United States
- Colors: Blue & orange
- Mascot: Dolphin
- Website: www.albemarle.edu

College of The Albemarle (COA) is a public community college in the Albemarle region of northeastern North Carolina. The main campus is in Elizabeth City with satellite campuses in Barco, Manteo and Edenton. Established on December 16, 1960, College of The Albemarle became the first institution of the North Carolina Community College System as chartered by the Community College Act of 1957.

== Campuses ==
COA serves students from Camden, Chowan, Currituck, Dare, Gates, Pasquotank, and Perquimans counties.

- Elizabeth City (Main Campus)
- Dare County (Manteo)
- Edenton-Chowan
- Regional Aviation and Technical Training Center (Barco)
