= Currituck County Courthouse and Jail =

Historic municipal buildings in North Carolina, US

- U.S. National Register of Historic Places
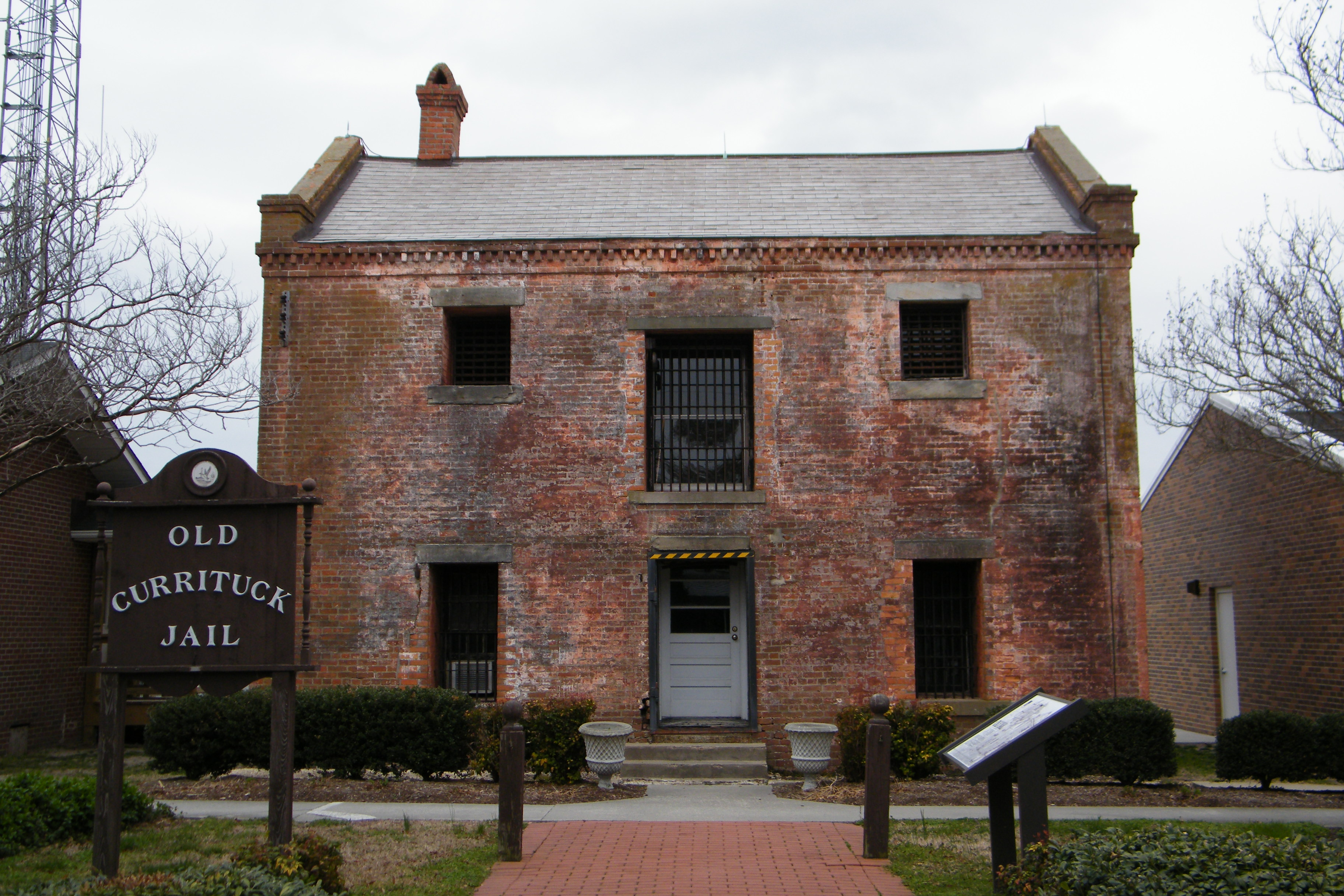
- Old Currituck County Jail, March 2011

- Location within North Carolina Location within the United States
- Location: SR 1242, Currituck, North Carolina
- Coordinates: 36°27′0″N 76°1′1″W
- Area: less than one acre
- Built: c. 1842, 1857, 1897, 1952
- Architectural style: Classical Revival, Early Republic
- MPS: North Carolina County Courthouses TR
- NRHP reference No.: 79001697
- Added to NRHP: May 10, 1979

Currituck County Courthouse and Jail is a historic courthouse and jail located at Currituck, Currituck County, North Carolina. The original two-story section of the courthouse was built about 1842, enlarged in 1897, and a rear wing was added in 1952. The 1897 remodeling added a second floor to the original one-story wings and Classical Revival style design elements. The jail was built about 1857, and is a two-story, rectangular building with 32 inch thick brick walls. It is one of the oldest extant jails in North Carolina.

It was listed on the National Register of Historic Places in 1979.

== Gallery ==
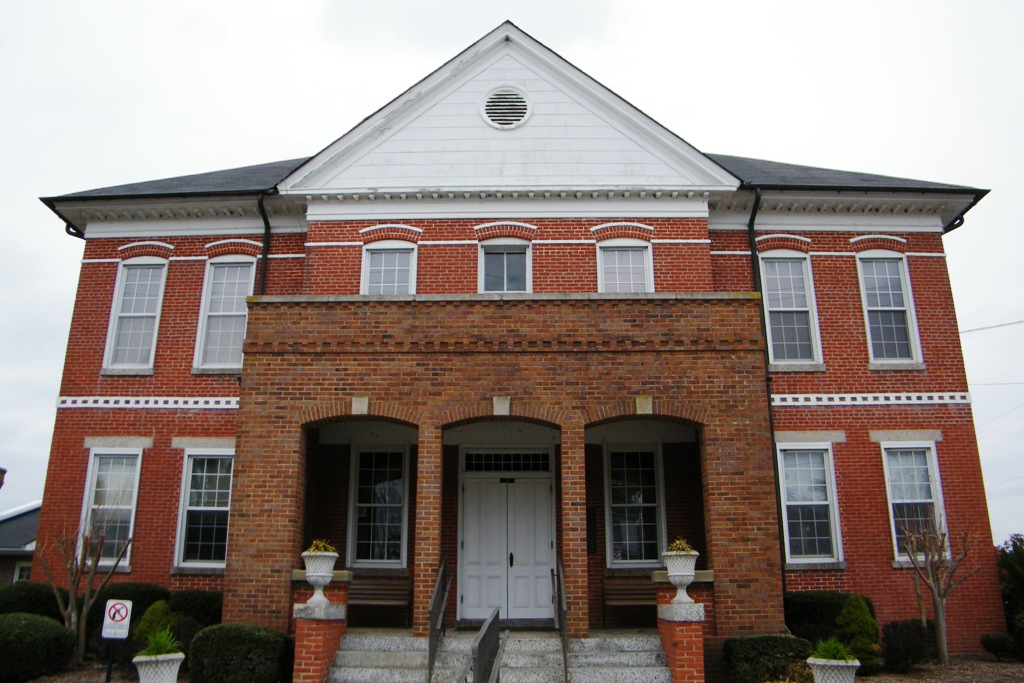
Currituck County Courthouse, March 2011
