= Capt John Gibbs =

American noble

John Gibbs was an American noble. He led Gibbs Rebellion in 1690 following the Governorship of Seth Sothel.

Gibbs emigrated from Devonshire, England and was a relation of Carolina Proprietor Christopher Monck. Gibbs was named a Cacique, a title of nobility in the Carolina Colony under the Fundamental Constitution of Carolina. The colony of Carolina was the only American colony to establish a title of nobility.

Governor Seth Sothel was removed from the Carolina colony in 1689. Gibbs was a member of the Carolina nobility and claimed governorship under rules established in the Fundamental Constitution. Gibbs's Rebellion was an early rebellion in the Carolina Colony. It occurred in 1690.

Carolina's noble titles were palatines, landgraves, and caciques. According to the Fundamental Constitution a noble could take control of the colony as governor if the post was vacant due to lack of an appointed governor or resident Lord Proprietor.

== Rebellion ==
Gibbs claimed the governorship during the vacancy following Seth Sothel's departure. The Lord Proprietors instead appointed Col. Philip Ludwell as governor. Ludwell arrived in 1690 over Gibbs' objections. Gibbs raised armed men and this armed gathering appeared at a precinct court. During this action they arrested two magistrates and shut down the court. Ludwell called upon the Governor of Virginia for aid to quell the uprising, who advised all parties to seek advice from the Lord Proprietors in England. The Proprietors gave their support to Ludwell, effectively ending Gibb's Rebellion.

Gibbs date of death is unknown.

== Legacy ==
The Gibbs Woods area of Currituck County, North Carolina bears his name.
