= Thomas Jarvis =

American politician (1623–1694)

1st Deputy Governor of North Carolina
- In office 1691–1694
- Preceded by: Position established
- Succeeded by: Thomas Harvey

Personal details
- Born: unknown (about 1620) unknown (England or Virginia)
- Died: 1694 Whites Island, North Carolina
- Spouse: Dorcas
- Children: 3

Thomas Jarvis (1623–1694) was the Deputy Governor of the Carolina Province from 1691 to 1694.

== Biography ==
Thomas Jarvis started his political career in 1672 as a member of the executive council under Governor Peter Carteret and continued to play an active role in colonial politics for two decades. He ventured south to the Albemarle Region with George Durant, John Jenkins, Thomas Harvey and others, mainly from Isle of Wight and Nansemond Counties, Virginia in 1658. From 1683 to 1689, Jarvis was the acting chief executive during the tenures of governors Seth Sothel and John Gibbs. In 1691 he was appointed Deputy Governor of North and South Carolina where he served under Governor Philip Ludwell. With this appointment, Thomas became the first deputy governor of the entire colony, including the area north-east of Cape Fear.

Very little is known about his private life or his origin (neither his birthplace nor his parents are known). Jarvis married Dorcas Foster. They had a son, Foster, and a daughter, Dorcas, who married Charles Neal. He purchased a piece of land located between the Perquimans River and Carolina Sound (at that time known as the Albemarle county). This land was purchased in conjunction with a Native American tribe. Jarvis was also granted 2600 acres (jointly with Col. Lemuel Mason and Thomas Willoughby) known as "White's Island", then stated to be "at" Currituck within Lower Norfolk County, Virginia, in 1688 (now known as "Church Island") It was here that he made his primary residence. Sometime before his appointment to deputy governor in 1691, Jarvis was a ship captain. In addition, Jarvis owned at least seven slaves (three were African Americans, two were Native Americans, and two were of biracial descent). He died in White's Island, Currituck County, North Carolina in 1694.
