= North Carolina Department of Transportation Ferry Division =

State-run ferry service in coastal North Carolina

Logo of the North Carolina Department of Transportation Ferry Division

The North Carolina Department of Transportation Ferry Division is a branch of NCDOT that is responsible for the operation of over two dozen ferry services that transport passengers and vehicles to several islands along the Outer Banks of North Carolina.

Three other inland, cable ferries—the Elwell Ferry, Parker's Ferry, and Sans Souci Ferry—continue in operation, under the direct oversight of the North Carolina Department of Transportation, and are not under the supervision of the Ferry Division. An additional coastal ferry servicing Hammocks Beach State Park is operated by the North Carolina Division of Parks and Recreation, and several private companies operate ferry services to sites such as Cape Lookout and Portsmouth Island.

== History ==
Ferries have always played a vital role to the residents and visitors of Eastern North Carolina. The first ferries began in the mid-1920s when Captain J.B. "Toby" Tillett established a tug and barge service across Oregon Inlet along North Carolina's Outer Banks.

In 1934, the North Carolina Highway Commission recognized the importance of this service to residents and began subsidizing Tillett's business. These subsidies kept tolls at an affordable level. In 1942, the Highway Commission began full reimbursement to eliminate the tolls. Tillett was fully subsidized until 1950 when his business was sold to the state.

In 1947, the Commission purchased the ferry operations of T.A. Baum, who operated a route that ran across Croatan Sound and linked Manns Harbor and Roanoke Island. This became the first route of the NC Ferry System.

The logo of the North Carolina Ferry System that appears on all the vessels beneath the name of the vessel on the tower

== Today ==
The North Carolina Department of Transportation Ferry Division extends over seven routes and one emergency route, has 22 ferries, and employs over 400 workers. The operations are supported by a full service shipyard at Manns Harbor and 10 support vessels, including dredge, military-style landing craft utility vehicles (LCUs), tugs, and barges. The Ferry Division operates over 200 sailings, with the ferries covering 1,200 miles (1,900 km) each day. The system includes the world's longest fare-free ferry route.

Each year, North Carolina ferries transport nearly 1 million vehicles and more than 2 million passengers across five separate bodies of water - the Currituck and Pamlico sounds and the Cape Fear, Neuse, and Pamlico rivers.

Ferries also carry essential goods to water-locked communities. Many residents depend on the ferries for transportation to school, work, and other needed services.

== Types of ferry boats ==
=== Hatteras Class ===
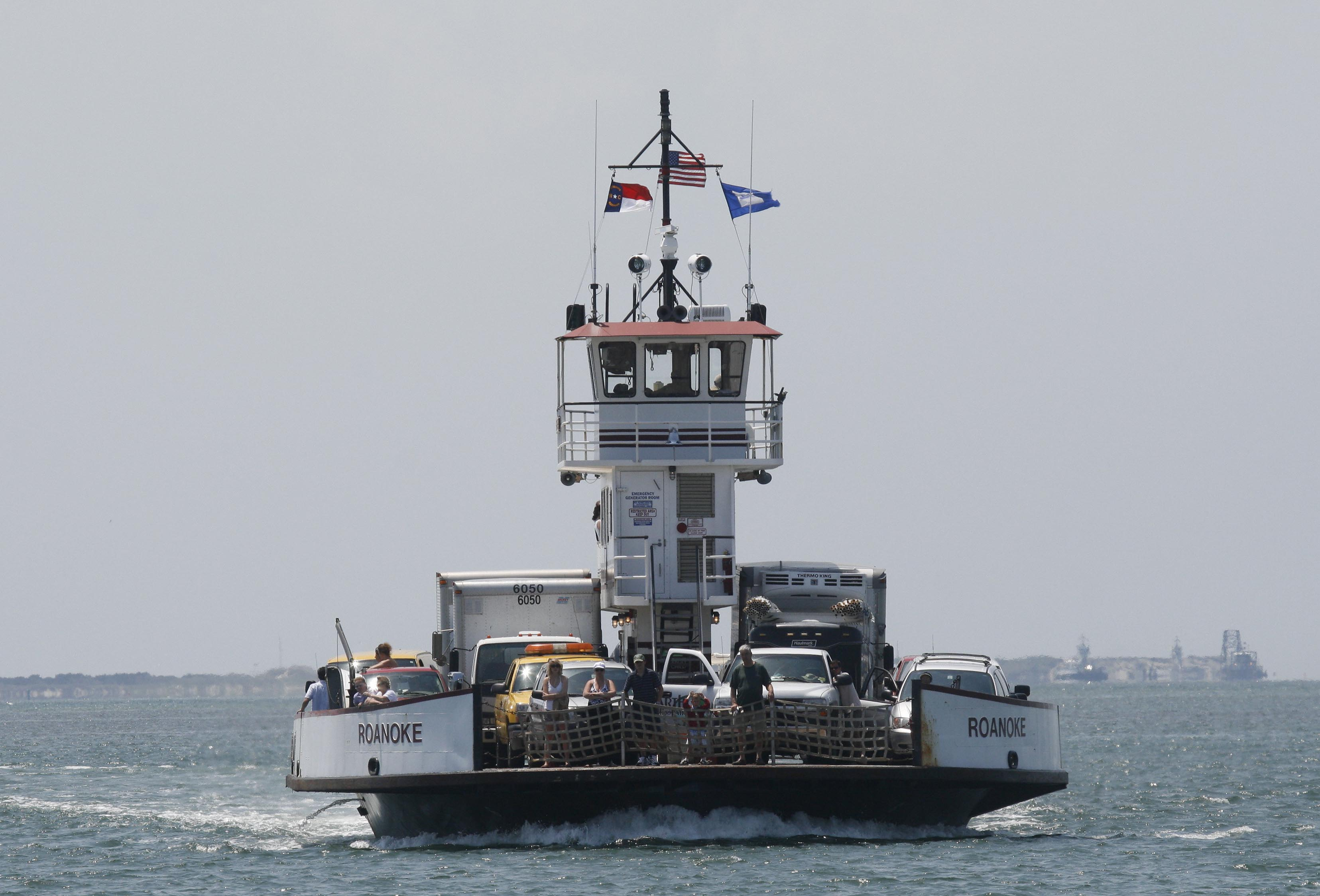
The Hatteras Class ferry, Roanoke, operating between Cherry Branch and Minnesott Beach on the Neuse River.

The North Carolina Ferry System operates seven Hatteras Class ferries. These Vessels draft only 4 feet, and are designed for the shallow waters and shifting shoals of Eastern North Carolina. Originally designed to carry 150 passengers, these ferries have been downrated to carry only 149 passengers with the introduction of new regulations regarding ferries capable of carrying 150 or more passengers. The Thomas A Baum was sold to a ferry company in the Virgin Islands. The Roanoke was sold to a ferry company in Connecticut.

Ferry Name	Kinnakeet	Chicamacomico	Cape Point	Ocracoke	Frisco
Year Built:	1989	1990	1990	1990	1990
Vehicle Capacity:	30	30	30	30	30
Passenger Capacity:	149	149	149	149	149
Gross Ton:	280	275	275	275	275
Length:	150'	150'	150'	150'	150'
Breadth:	42'	42'	42'	42'	42'
Draft:	4'	4'	4'	4'	4'

=== River Class ===
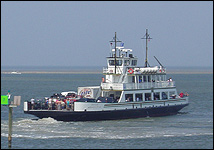
The River Class ferry, Croatoan, operating between Cape Hatteras and Ocracoke Island in the Outer Banks.

The Ferry System operates twelve River Class ferries. These boats are designed for heavy, abusive use, and are double-ended (except the Hunt), meaning they do not have to turn around at the docks. This feature saves time on busy river routes. River class ferries are slowly replacing the older Hatteras class ferries.

Ferry Name	Daniel Russell	Southport	Neuse	Floyd J. Lupton	Fort Fisher	Croatoan	W. Stanford White	Hatteras	Rodanthe	James B. Hunt	Salvo	Avon	
Year Built:	1993	1996	1998	2000	2000	2003	2003	2006	2019	1984	2022	2023	
Vehicle Capacity:	42	42	42	40	40	40	40	40	40	20	40	40	
Passenger Capacity:	300	300	300	300	300	300	300	300	300	149	300		300
Gross Ton:	418	424	374	374	374	376	372	374	388	462	388	388	
Length:	180'	180'	180'	180'	180'	180'	180'	180'	176'	125'	176'	176'	
Breadth:	44'	44'	44'	44'	44'	44'	44'	44'	46'	40'	46'	46'	
Draft"	6'	6'	6'	6'	6'	5'6"	5'6"	5'6"	6'	5'	6'	6'	

=== Sound Class ===
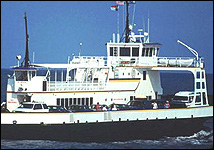
The Sound Class ferry, Cedar Island, operating between Cedar Island and Ocracoke Island in the Outer Banks.

The North Carolina Ferry System operates five Sound Class ferries. These ferries are the largest in the system, able to carry up to 50 cars. These Ferries are designed to withstand the abuse of constantly traversing the shallow, turbulent waters of the Pamlico Sound. The M/V Pamlico has been sold to Cross Sound Ferry of New London, CT. The M/V Pamlico is the sister ship of the M/V Silver Lake.

Ferry Name	Silver Lake	Carteret	Cedar Island	Swan Quarter	Sea Level
Year Built:	1965	1989	1994	2011	2012
Vehicle Capacity:	50	50	50	46	46
Passenger Capacity:	300	300	300	300	300
Gross Ton:	688	771	648	867	867
Length:	220'	220'	220'	220'	
Breadth:	48'	50'	50'	50'	50'
Draft"	6'	6'6"	6'6"	7'6"	7'6"

== Routes ==
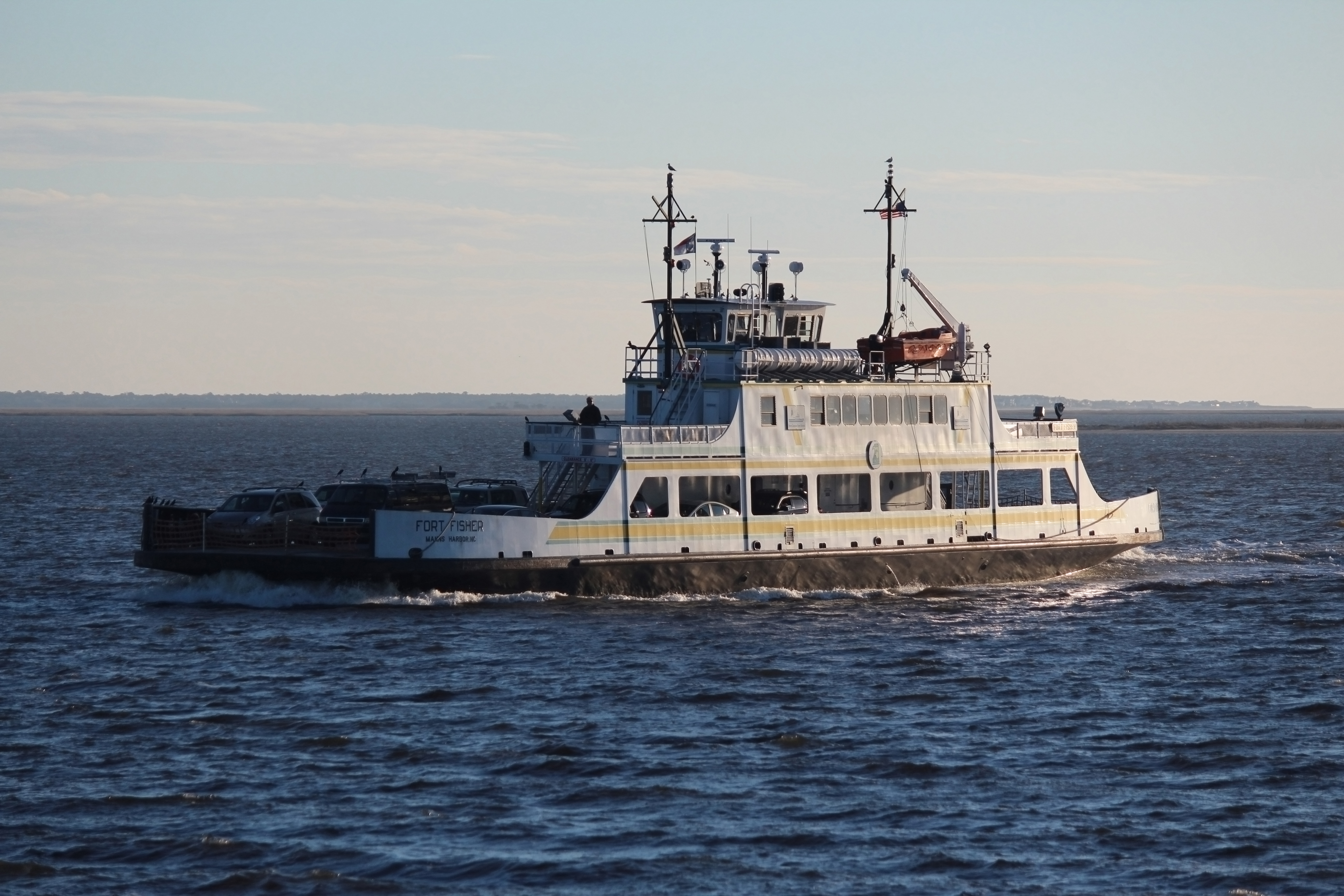
M/V Fort Fisher on the Southport–Fort Fisher Ferry route

- Knotts Island–Currituck: This route was created in the fall of 1962, and is the world's longest free ferry. It links NC 615 to the mainland, across the Currituck Sound between Knott's Island and Currituck. This was done to shorten the travel time for Knott's Island school children to their school on the mainland.
- Hatteras–Ocracoke: Service began across Hatteras Inlet in 1953 to connect the islands of Hatteras and Ocracoke; it links NC 12. This route is the busiest in the system, with about 1 million passengers using this crossing yearly.
- Swan Quarter–Ocracoke: The newest route in the system, service was begun across the Pamlico Sound between Swan Quarter and Ocracoke in 1977; it links NC 45. This was done to connect residents of Ocracoke to their county seat for Hyde County.
- Cedar Island–Ocracoke: In 1961, service was begun between Cedar Island and Ocracoke to provide a connection for NC 12 to the mainland, and allow better travel to and from the Outer Banks across the Pamlico Sound.
- Bayview–Aurora: Service to connect NC 306 across the Pamlico River began in 1966 to provide workers at the mining companies in Aurora a direct connection to their homes on the north bank of the river.
- Cherry Branch–Minnesott Beach: To complete NC 306, service began across the Neuse River in 1973. This route is used heavily by workers at the Cherry Point Marine Corps Air Station to commute to and from their homes in Pamlico County.
- Southport–Fort Fisher: Service began across the Cape Fear River in 1965; it links NC 211 to US 421. This route was designed for use by tourists traveling between the attractions north and south of the mouth of the Cape Fear.

Route	Currituck	Stumpy Point	Hatteras	Swan Quarter	Cedar Island	Bayview	Cherry Branch	Southport
Route	Knotts Island	Rodanthe	Ocracoke	Ocracoke		Aurora	Minnesott Beach	Fort Fisher
State Highway	NC 615	NC 12 Detour	NC 12	NC 45	NC 12	NC 306	NC 306	NC 211
Body of Water	Currituck Sound	Pamlico Sound	Hatteras Inlet	Pamlico Sound		Pamlico River	Neuse River	Cape Fear River
Crossing time	45 min.	1 hr, 45 min.	1 hr.	2 hrs, 40 min.	2 hrs, 15 min	30 min.	20 min.	35 min.
Distance	5 miles	18 miles	4.5 miles	27 miles	23 miles	3.5 miles	2.5 miles	3.5 miles
Fare	Free	Free	Free	Toll	Toll	Free	Free	Toll
Annual Vehicles	30,000	N/A	353,000	27,000	76,000	82,000	277,000	185,000
Annual Passengers	90,000	N/A	960,000	65,000	184,000	130,000	487,000	500,000

=== Emergency route ===
- Stumpy Point–Rodanthe: An emergency service which provides an alternate means of connecting the north end of Hatteras Island to the mainland. It runs only on an as-needed basis, which typically occurs after a hurricane washes out NC 12 near the Oregon Inlet. When in operation, usually six departures from each terminal are scheduled per day, and normally only essential vehicles and local residents may use the service. It is a 1.75-hour, fare-free, crossing. The route connects NC 12 to US 264 West. The Stumpy Point and Rodanthe ferry terminals were constructed in 2002 and 2001, respectively.

== Tolls ==
As of April 2023, most of the ferries are free to use. The exceptions are the Cedar Island-Ocracoke, Swan-Quarter-Ocracoke, and Southport-Fort Fisher vehicle ferries. For the two Ocracoke ferries, the fares are $1 for pedestrians, $3 for bicycles, $10 for motorcycles, scooters, ATVs, golf carts, or three-wheeled vehicles, $15 for four wheeled vehicles up to 20 feet, as well as motorcycles with sidecars or trailers, $30 for vehicles 20-40 feet, and $45 for vehicles 40-65 feet. For the Southport-Fort Fisher ferry, the rates are $1 for pedestrians, $2 for bicycles, $3 for motorcycles, scooters, ATVs, golf carts, or three-wheeled vehicles, $7 for four wheeled vehicles up to 20 feet, as well as motorcycles with sidecars or trailer, $14 for vehicles 20-40 feet, and $28 for vehicles 40-65 feet.
