= North Carolina Highway 610 =

State highway in Guilford County, North Carolina, US

North Carolina Highway 610
- Fairfield Road

Route information
- Maintained by NCDOT
- Length: 2.1 mi (3.4 km)
- Existed: 1930–present

Major junctions
- West end: Main Street in High Point
- East end: NC 62 near Archdale

Location
- Country: United States
- State: North Carolina
- Counties: Guilford

Highway system
- North Carolina Highway System; Interstate; US; State; Scenic
← US 601	→ NC 615

North Carolina Highway 610 (NC 610) is a 2.1-mile-long (3.4 km) primary state highway in the U.S. state of North Carolina. The highway connects Main Street in southern High Point with North Carolina Highway 62 east of Archdale.

== Route description ==
NC 610 is a connector route that establishes a link between Main Street (formerly US 311) and NC 62 near the downtown area of Archdale. The highway begins along a commercial area of Main Street, approximately 1 mile north of the center of Archdale. The highway runs east along Fairfield Road, through a residential area of southern High Point. In addition to multiple houses, the highway passes by a Prep Academy, along with several small businesses and a Wesleyan Church. NC 610 ends at an intersection with NC 62 (Liberty Road) and Aldridge Road, near I-85.

The highway provides indirect access between High Point and Interstate 85/Interstate 74.

== History ==
NC 610 was established in 1930 as a connector route running from US 311/NC 77 to its parent route NC 61, following its present-day routing. its routing has remained unchanged since. By 1940, NC 61 was replaced with NC 62 forming the current eastern terminus of the highway. On September 8, 2011, US 311 was deleted along Main Street and placed along a new freeway concurrency with I-74. This left the western terminus of NC 610 without an official highway designation.

== Junction list ==
The entire route is in Guilford County.

Location	mi	km	Destinations	Notes
High Point	0.0	0.0	Main Street (former US 311)	
Archdale	2.1	3.4	NC 62	
1.000 mi = 1.609 km; 1.000 km = 0.621 mi
