= Harbinger, North Carolina =

Unincorporated community in North Carolina, US

- Unincorporated community
- Location within North Carolina Location within the United States
- Coordinates: 36°06′08″N 75°48′51″W
- Country: United States
- State: North Carolina
- County: Currituck
- Elevation: 13 ft (4.0 m)
- Time zone: UTC-5 (Eastern (EST))
  - Summer (DST): UTC-4 (EDT)
- ZIP code: 27941
- Area code: 252
- GNIS feature ID: 1020616

Harbinger is an unincorporated community in Currituck County, North Carolina, United States. The community is located along U.S. Highway 158 near the southern tip of the peninsula which forms mainland Currituck County. Harbinger has a post office with ZIP code 27941.

== Geography ==
=== Climate ===
This region experiences hot and wet summers with rainy days. According to the Köppen Climate Classification system, Harbinger has a humid subtropical climate (Köppen Cfa).

There are cool winters during which intense rainfall can occur in nor'easters.

Climate data for Harbinger, North Carolina
Month	Jan	Feb	Mar	Apr	May	Jun	Jul	Aug	Sep	Oct	Nov	Dec	Year
Mean daily maximum °F (°C)	52.0 (11.1)	53.0 (11.7)	59.0 (15.0)	69.0 (20.6)	76.0 (24.4)	84.0 (28.9)	87.0 (30.6)	87.0 (30.6)	82.0 (27.8)	73.0 (22.8)	62.0 (16.7)	57.0 (13.9)	70.1 (21.2)
Mean daily minimum °F (°C)	38.0 (3.3)	39.0 (3.9)	44.0 (6.7)	53.0 (11.7)	62.0 (16.7)	71.0 (21.7)	74.0 (23.3)	74.0 (23.3)	70.0 (21.1)	61.0 (16.1)	50.0 (10.0)	43.0 (6.1)	56.6 (13.7)
Source: NOAA
