= Mackay Island National Wildlife Refuge =

United States National Wildlife Refuge in Virginia

- IUCN category IV (habitat/species management area)
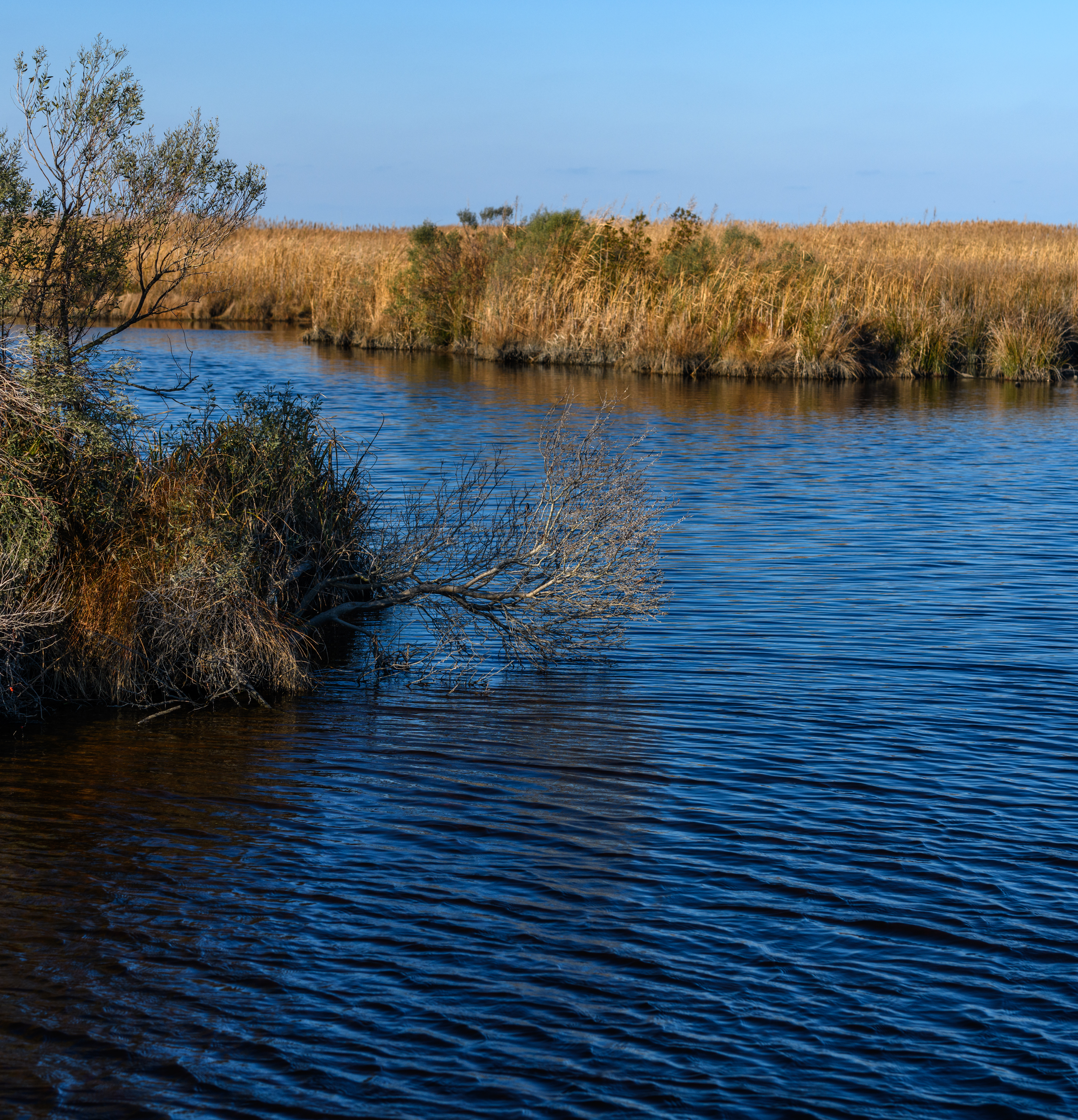
- Mackay Island Wildlife Refuge

- Location within Virginia Location within the United States
- Location: Currituck County, North Carolina, Virginia Beach, Virginia, United States
- Coordinates: 36°31′20″N 75°57′00″W
- Area: 8,231 acres (33.31 km^{2})
- Established: 1960
- Governing body: U.S. Fish and Wildlife Service
- Website: Mackay Island National Wildlife Refuge

Mackay Island National Wildlife Refuge was established in 1960 to provide habitat for migratory waterfowl, primarily the greater snow goose. It is located almost entirely on Knotts Island in the Currituck Sound between Back Bay in Virginia Beach, Virginia, and the open sound in North Carolina. Most of the refuge lies within North Carolina but some of it is in Virginia. The refuge is primarily made up of marsh habitat. This area has long been recognized for supporting significant migratory waterfowl populations and sport fishery resources, and is part of the Charles Kuralt Trail.

The refuge is strategically located along the Atlantic Flyway, making it an important wintering area for ducks, geese, and tundra swans. At times, flocks of over 12,000 snow geese may be observed on the refuge after their arrival in November. Many other wildlife species such as wading birds, shorebirds, raptors, neotropical migrants, mammals, reptiles, and amphibians use refuge habitats for food, cover, and nesting. A pair of bald eagles also nest on the refuge.

About 74 percent of the refuge is slightly brackish marsh habitat, dominated by cattails, black needlerush, and giant cordgrass. The remaining habitat includes farmland, marsh impoundments, brush and typical upland and lowland eastern pine-hardwood forest. Vegetation in these areas includes loblolly pine, sweet gum, black gum, cypress, red maple, hickory, and oak.

The refuge has a surface area of 8,231 acres (33.31 km^{2}). Of this, 7,357 acres (29.77 km^{2}) is in North Carolina and 874 acres (3.54 km^{2}) is in Virginia.
