= Cherry Branch, North Carolina =

- Census-designated place
- Location within North Carolina Location within the United States
- Coordinates: 34°55′58″N 76°48′37″W
- Country: United States
- State: North Carolina
- County: Craven

Area
  - Total: 1.66 sq mi (4.29 km^{2})
  - Land: 1.15 sq mi (2.97 km^{2})
  - Water: 0.51 sq mi (1.32 km^{2})
- Elevation: 3 ft (0.91 m)

Population (2020)
  - Total: 1,211
  - Density: 1,054.8/sq mi (407.27/km^{2})
- Time zone: UTC-5 (Eastern (EST))
  - Summer (DST): UTC-4 (EDT)
- ZIP Code: 28532 (Havelock)
- Area code: 252
- FIPS code: 37-12186
- GNIS feature ID: 2812787

Cherry Branch is a planned community and census-designated place (CDP) in Craven County, North Carolina, United States. It was first listed as a CDP in the 2020 census with a population of 1,211.

== Geography ==
The community is in southeastern Craven County, on the south bank of the tidal Neuse River. By land, it is reached by North Carolina Highway 306 (Ferry Road), which leads south 4 miles (6 km) to North Carolina Highway 101 at a point 5 miles (8 km) east of Havelock. A free ferry runs from Cherry Branch across the Neuse River to Minnesott Beach in Pamlico County.

== Demographics ==
Historical population
Census	Pop.	Note	%±
2020	1,211		—
U.S. Decennial Census; 2020

=== 2020 census ===
Cherry Branch CDP, North Carolina – Demographic Profile (NH = Non-Hispanic)
Race / Ethnicity	Pop 2020	% 2020
White alone (NH)	831	68.62%
Black or African American alone (NH)	168	13.87%
Native American or Alaska Native alone (NH)	3	0.25%
Asian alone (NH)	23	1.90%
Pacific Islander alone (NH)	1	0.08%
Some Other Race alone (NH)	9	0.74%
Mixed Race/Multi-Racial (NH)	89	7.35%
Hispanic or Latino (any race)	87	7.18%
Total	1,211	100.00%

Note: the US Census treats Hispanic/Latino as an ethnic category. This table excludes Latinos from the racial categories and assigns them to a separate category. Hispanics/Latinos can be of any race.
