= Gibbs' Rebellion =

1690 American rebellion in the Carolina Colony,

Gibbs' Rebellion was an early rebellion in the Carolina Colony. It occurred in 1690. During the Carolina Proprietary era the colony of Carolina was the only colony to create titles of nobility. The tiles were palatines, landgraves, and caciques. According to the Fundamental Constitutions of 1669 a noble could take control of the colony as governor if the post was vacant due to lack of an appointed governor or Lord Proprietor in residence in the colony.

Capt John Gibbs, cacique claimed the governorship during a vacancy after the governorship of Seth Sothe. The Lord Proprietors appointed Col. Philip Ludwell as governor. Ludwell arrived in 1690 and Gibbs objected to this. Gibbs raised armed men and this armed gathering appeared at a precinct court. During this action they arrested two magistrates and shut down the court. Ludwell called upon the Governor of Virginia for aid to quell the uprising, who advised all parties to seek advise from the Lords Proprietor in England. The Proprietors gave their support to Ludwell which effectively ended Gibbs' Rebellion.
