= Currituck County Regional Airport =

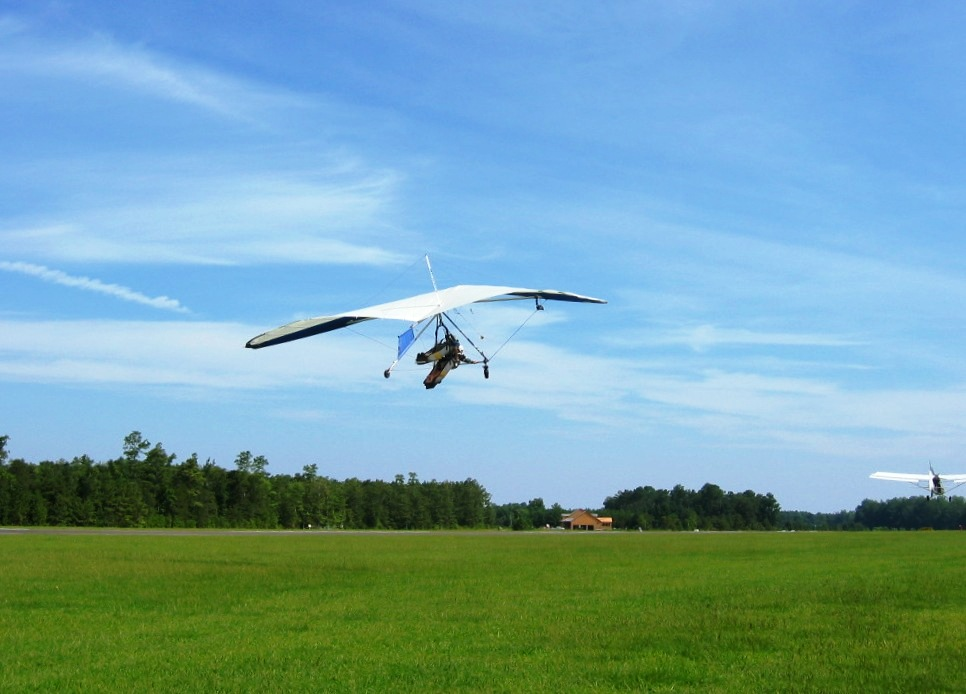
- IATA: none; ICAO: KONX; FAA LID: ONX

Summary
- Airport type: Public
- Owner: County of Currituck
- Serves: Currituck, North Carolina
- Location: Crawford Township, Currituck County
- Elevation AMSL: 18 ft (5.5 m)
- Coordinates: 36°23′59″N 076°00′56″W
- Website: www.co.currituck.nc.us/...

Map
- Location of airport in North Carolina

Runways
Direction	Length		Surface
Direction	ft	m	Surface
5/23	5,500	1,676	Asphalt/Concrete

Statistics (2011)
- Aircraft operations: 25,000
- Based aircraft: 37
- Source: Federal Aviation Administration

Currituck County Regional Airport (ICAO: KONX, FAA LID: ONX, formerly 9W7) is a county-owned, public-use airport in Currituck County, North Carolina, United States. It is located four nautical miles (5 mi, 7 km) south of the central business district of Currituck, North Carolina. This airport is included in the National Plan of Integrated Airport Systems for 2011–2015, which categorized it as a general aviation facility. It was previously known as Currituck County Airport or Currituck Regional Airport.

Although most U.S. airports use the same three-letter location identifier for the FAA and IATA, this airport is assigned ONX by the FAA but has no designation from the IATA (which assigned ONX to Enrique A. Jiménez Airport in Colón, Panama). The airport's ICAO identifier is KONX.

== History ==
Currituck Regional Airport was built by the United States Army Air Forces about 1942, and was known as Barco Flight Strip. It was an emergency landing airfield for military aircraft on training flights. It was closed after World War II and was turned over for local government use by the War Assets Administration (WAA). Between 1955 and 1959, when the airstrip was known as Maple Airstrip, it was used for drag races, some of which were sanctioned by the NHRA (National Hot Rod Association). However, this ended after a drag race crash on February 22, 1959, when a driver (Earl Layden) lost control of his car and crashed into spectators and their cars on the side of the airstrip. He and one spectator died, and several others were injured; after a subsequent lawsuit, the agency granting the lease to use the airstrip for racing terminated it (it was near a prison, and the agency thought spectators were providing contraband to the prisoners). In later years, Currituck County took over airport operations. In recent years, Currituck Regional Airport has experienced a constant increase in aircraft based at this field.

== Expansion ==
In an attempt to improve facilities at Currituck Regional Airport, a 20-year Airport Improvement Program has been created in 2000 to identify improvements in the near, short and long term for the airport. Some of these improvements include:

- Phase 1 - 0-5 Years (Should already be complete)
  - 1,500' Extension of Runway 5/23 complete
  - Clear obstructions from runway approaches
  - Construct new terminal building
- Phase 2 - 6–10 Years
- Phase 3 - 11–20 Years
- Phase 4 – 21+ Years

== Facilities and aircraft ==
Currituck County Regional Airport covers an area of 250 acres (101 ha) at an elevation of 18 feet (5 m) above mean sea level. It has one runway designated 5/23 with an asphalt and concrete surface measuring 5,500 by 150 feet (1,676 x 46 m).

For the 12-month period ending November 9, 2011, the airport had 25,000 aircraft operations, an average of 68 per day: 70% general aviation, 28% military, and 2% air taxi. At that time there were 37 aircraft based at this airport: 84% single-engine, 5% multi-engine, 3% helicopter, and 8% ultralight.

== See also ==
- List of airports in North Carolina
