= Minnesott Beach, North Carolina =

- Town
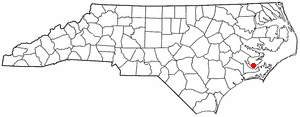
- Location of Minnesott, North Carolina
- Coordinates: 34°59′10″N 76°49′27″W
- Country: United States
- State: North Carolina
- County: Pamlico

Area
  - Total: 3.54 sq mi (9.18 km^{2})
  - Land: 3.47 sq mi (8.99 km^{2})
  - Water: 0.073 sq mi (0.19 km^{2})
- Elevation: 30 ft (9.1 m)

Population (2020)
  - Total: 530
  - Density: 152.7/sq mi (58.94/km^{2})
- Time zone: UTC-5 (Eastern (EST))
  - Summer (DST): UTC-4 (EDT)
- ZIP code: 28510
- Area code: 252
- FIPS code: 37-43440
- GNIS feature ID: 2406169
- Website: www.minnesottbeachnc.govoffice2.com

Minnesott Beach is a town in Pamlico County, North Carolina, United States. As of the 2020 census, Minnesott Beach had a population of 530. It is part of the New Bern, North Carolina Metropolitan Statistical Area.

== Geography ==
According to the United States Census Bureau, the town has a total area of 1.5 square miles (3.9 km^{2}), of which 1.5 square miles (3.9 km^{2}) is land and 0.65% is water.

== Demographics ==
Historical population
Census	Pop.	Note	%±
1980	171		—
1990	266		55.6%
2000	311		16.9%
2010	440		41.5%
2020	530		20.5%
U.S. Decennial Census

As of the census of 2000, there were 311 people, 151 households, and 109 families residing in the town. The population density was 203.5 people per square mile (78.6 people/km^{2}). There were 230 housing units at an average density of 150.5 per square mile (58.1/km^{2}). The racial makeup of the town was 95.50% White, 3.54% African American, 0.64% Asian, and 0.32% from two or more races. Hispanic or Latino of any race were 0.96% of the population.

There were 151 households, out of which 13.9% had children under the age of 18 living with them, 64.9% were married couples living together, 6.6% had a female householder with no husband present, and 27.8% were non-families. 25.8% of all households were made up of individuals, and 14.6% had someone living alone who was 65 years of age or older. The average household size was 2.06 and the average family size was 2.42.

In the town, the population was spread out, with 11.9% under the age of 18, 3.5% from 18 to 24, 17.7% from 25 to 44, 37.9% from 45 to 64, and 28.9% who were 65 years of age or older. The median age was 54 years. For every 100 females, there were 95.6 males. For every 100 females age 18 and over, there were 94.3 males.

The median income for a household in the town was $54,583, and the median income for a family was $60,250. Males had a median income of $43,125 versus $34,583 for females. The per capita income for the town was $27,259. About 0.9% of families and 2.3% of the population were below the poverty line, including 3.2% of those under age 18 and none of those age 65 or over.
