= Moyock, North Carolina =

- Census-designated place
- Location within North Carolina
- Coordinates: 36°30′59″N 76°10′22″W
- Country: United States
- State: North Carolina
- County: Currituck

Area
  - Total: 10.53 sq mi (27.26 km^{2})
  - Land: 10.43 sq mi (27.02 km^{2})
  - Water: 0.093 sq mi (0.24 km^{2})
- Elevation: 10 ft (3.0 m)

Population (2020)
  - Total: 5,154
  - Density: 494.0/sq mi (190.72/km^{2})
- Time zone: UTC-5 (Eastern (EST))
  - Summer (DST): UTC-4 (EDT)
- ZIP code: 27958
- Area code: 252
- GNIS feature ID: 2628646
- FIPS code: 37-45460

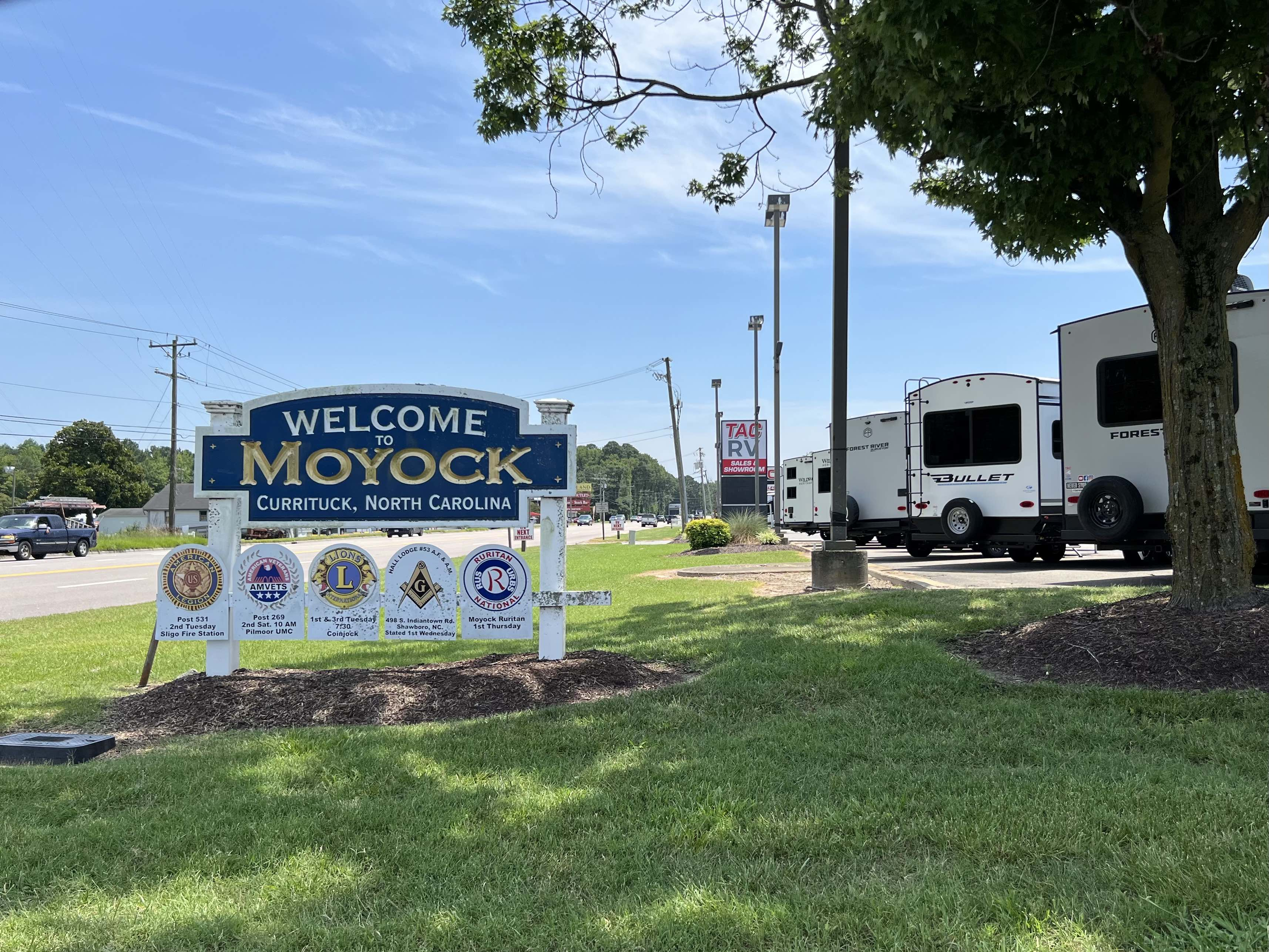
Moyock

Moyock /ˈmoʊjɒk/ is an unincorporated community and census-designated place (CDP) in Currituck County, North Carolina, United States. As of the 2020 census it had a population of 5,154.

== Geography ==
Moyock is located on North Carolina Highway 168 just south of the Virginia state line. The community sits at the end of the Chesapeake Expressway toll road, and is only 25 miles (40 km) south of downtown Norfolk, Virginia. Because of this, Moyock has begun to witness an increase in residential development as an emerging commuter town for the Hampton Roads region. NC 168 leads southeast 11 miles (18 km) to Currituck, the county seat.

=== Driving distances ===
Areas north of the N.C. state line are a short to medium distance away. Moyock is the closest of all North Carolina locales to the following places:

- The Delmarva Peninsula at Fisherman Island before the Chesapeake Bay Bridge-Tunnel toll booth is 49 miles (79 km) to the north.
- The Mason–Dixon line at Selbyville, Delaware, is 162 miles (261 km) to the north.
- The New Jersey state line where crossed by the Cape May-Lewes Ferry in the middle of Delaware Bay is 198 miles (319 km) to the north (8 miles (13 km) into the bay after leaving Lewes, Delaware). This is the closest distance that North Carolina is to the Northeastern United States.

== Demographics ==
Historical population
Census	Pop.	Note	%±
2020	5,154		—
U.S. Decennial Census

=== 2020 census ===
Moyock racial composition
Race	Number	Percentage
White (non-Hispanic)	4,116	79.86%
Black or African American (non-Hispanic)	381	7.39%
Native American	15	0.29%
Asian	92	1.79%
Pacific Islander	6	0.12%
Other/Mixed	328	6.36%
Hispanic or Latino	216	4.19%

As of the 2020 census, Moyock had a population of 5,154. The median age was 38.1 years. 26.6% of residents were under the age of 18 and 12.6% of residents were 65 years of age or older. For every 100 females there were 100.8 males, and for every 100 females age 18 and over there were 98.0 males age 18 and over.

0.0% of residents lived in urban areas, while 100.0% lived in rural areas.

There were 1,717 households in Moyock, of which 44.1% had children under the age of 18 living in them. Of all households, 72.2% were married-couple households, 10.2% were households with a male householder and no spouse or partner present, and 13.5% were households with a female householder and no spouse or partner present. About 11.6% of all households were made up of individuals and 4.1% had someone living alone who was 65 years of age or older. There were 1,187 families residing in the CDP.

There were 1,775 housing units, of which 3.3% were vacant. The homeowner vacancy rate was 0.7% and the rental vacancy rate was 5.0%.

== Greyhound racing in Moyock ==
Local greyhound racing was originally in Norfolk County in the 1930s, until Virginia officials shut down the Cavalier Kennel Club (CKC). The CKC moved their operations a half mile south of the state line to a quarter-mile oval track in Moyock on North Carolina Highway 168. Prior to when they moved to Moyock, the CKC attracted gamblers and spectators from all over the Hampton Roads region from the late 1940s until the early 1950s. The track's primary market was the thousands of service men (mostly U.S. Navy personnel) that were stationed in Norfolk. Not long after its establishment in North Carolina, anti-gambling advocates and the North Carolina Supreme Court upheld the North Carolina State Legislature's anti-dog-racing law in 1954. It was until 2009 that the CKC was able to claim that Paul Hartwell invented the greyhound letter rating system, which stood as the standard for all greyhound racing, which also led to the Composite Speed Rating system.

== NASCAR in Moyock ==
After the Cavalier Kennel Club (CKC) was eliminated by the North Carolina General Assembly in the 1950s, Moyock began to host auto racing at the renamed Dog Track Speedway (DTS). Built on the former site of the CKC, the one-quarter-mile oval dirt track was then paved and lengthened to one-third of a mile in 1964. At the DTS, it hosted seven NASCAR races from 1962 until 1966. The Moyock 300 was held there from 1964–1965 in addition to the Tidewater 300 in 1965.

Ned Jarrett won the most races at the track with two wins in 1962 and 1964. Jarret's Ford raced and won all six times, totaling $4,631 in winnings. Richard Petty, a North Carolina native from Randleman, also raced there six times, driving a Plymouth in every race. Despite being on the pole twice (1965 & 1966), Petty never finished above 3rd place. His total winnings at the DTS were $1,700.

The final NASCAR race at the DTS ran on Sunday, May 29, 1966. It was 301 laps (99.9 miles), and David Pearson took the checkered flag in a 1964 Dodge with an average speed of 61.913 miles per hour (99.639 km/h) and winning $1,000. The track was closed later in 1966 due to declining attendance, poor revenues and larger tracks being built nearby.

== International business ==
Moyock was the corporate headquarters of Blackwater Worldwide, which was renamed Xe Services LLC, and relocated to Arlington County, Virginia, as Academi.
