= Barco, North Carolina =

- Unincorporated community
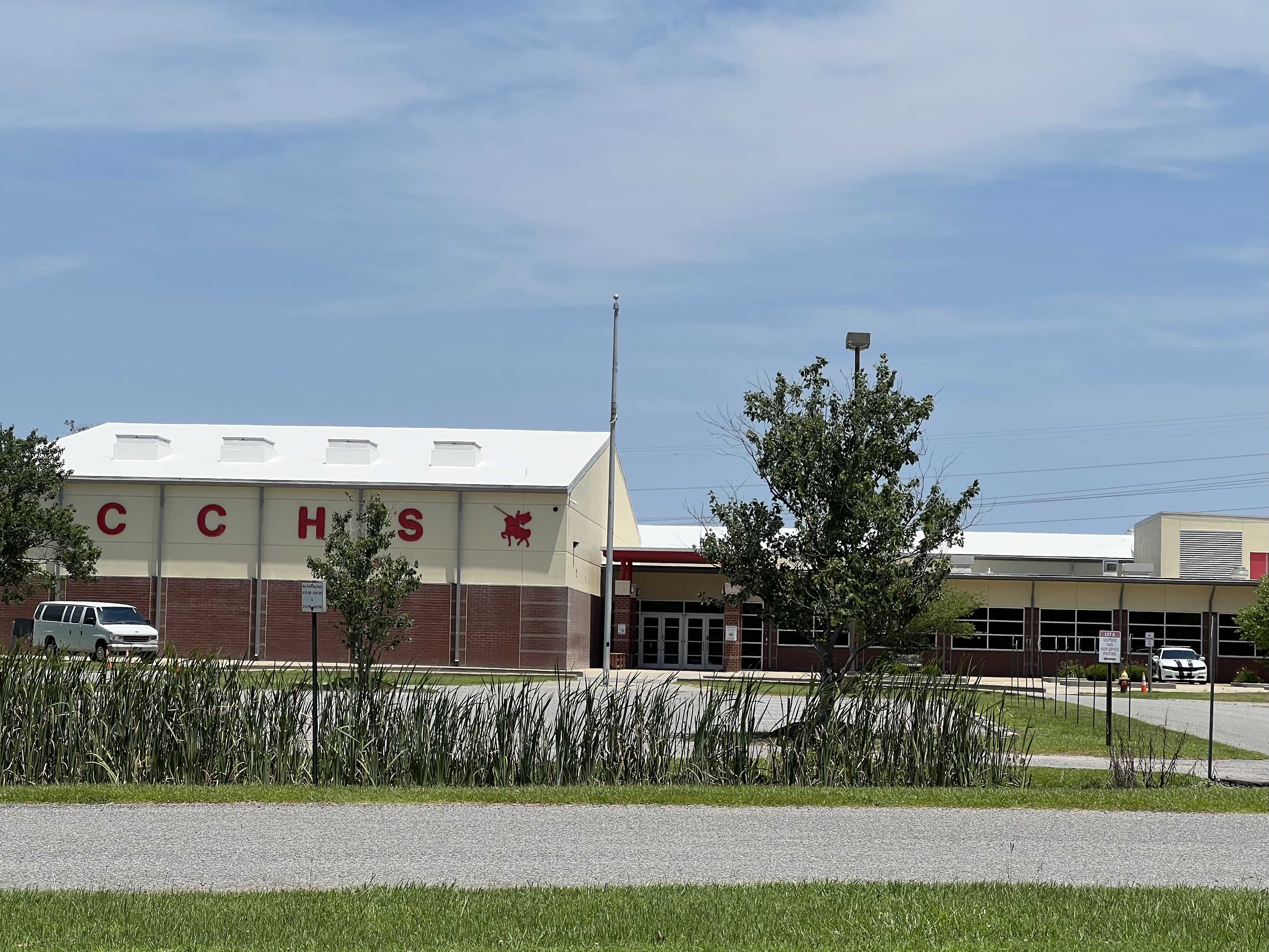
- Currituck County High School, in Barco.

- Location within North Carolina Location within the United States
- Coordinates: 36°23′31″N 75°58′47″W
- Country: United States
- State: North Carolina
- County: Currituck
- Elevation: 10 ft (3.0 m)
- Time zone: UTC-5 (Eastern (EST))
  - Summer (DST): UTC-4 (EDT)
- ZIP code: 27917
- Area code: 252
- GNIS feature ID: 1018960

Barco is an unincorporated community in Currituck County, North Carolina, United States at the southern terminus of North Carolina Highway 168, on U.S. Highway 158.

It is the home of Currituck County High School and Currituck County Middle School.
