= Currituck Sound =

Lagoon in North Carolina and Virginia

Coordinates: 36°17′01″N 75°52′14″W

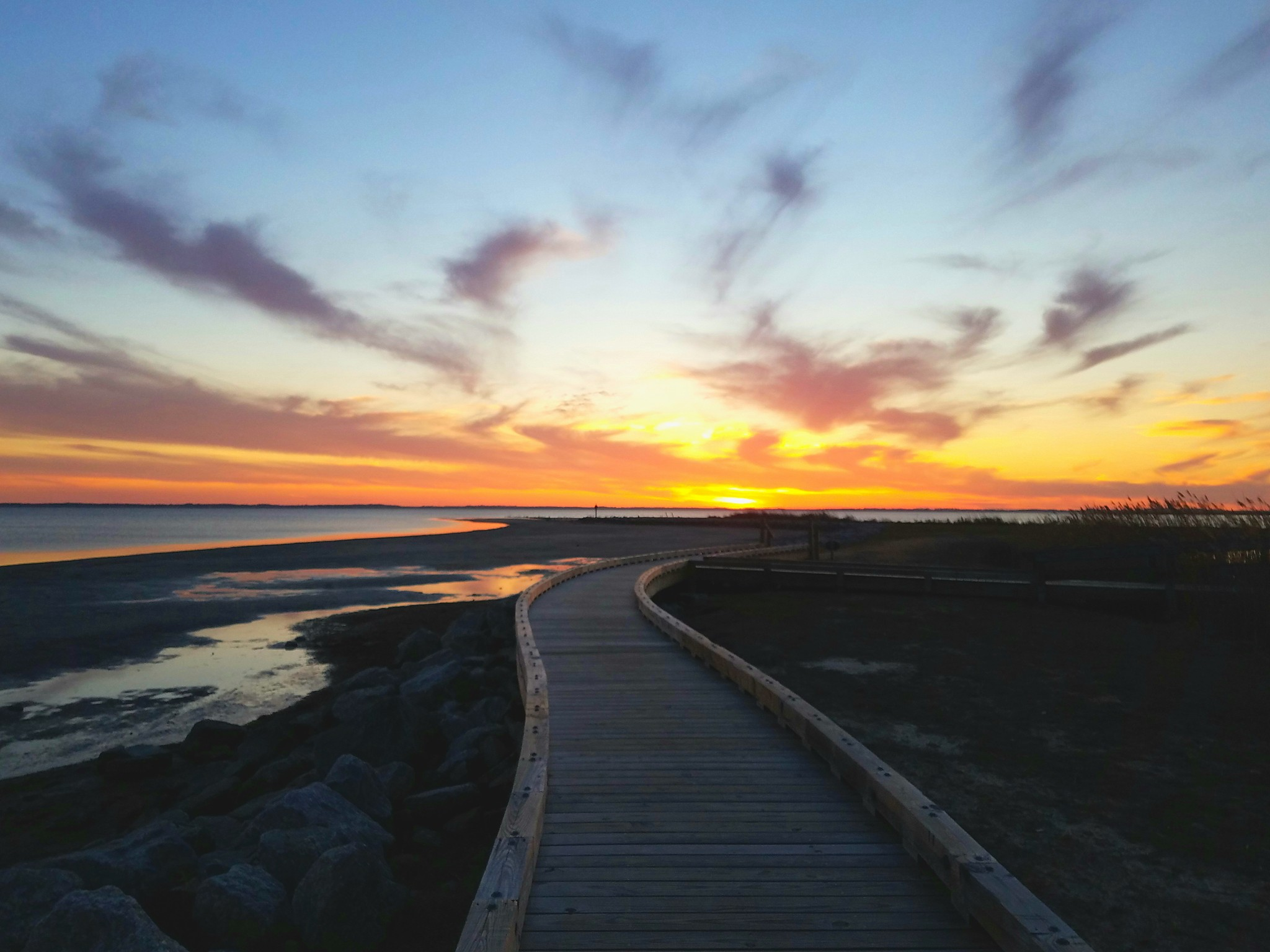
- The Currituck Sound at Whalehead Historic Park in 2020
- Interactive map of Currituck Sound
- Location: North Carolina and Virginia, U.S.

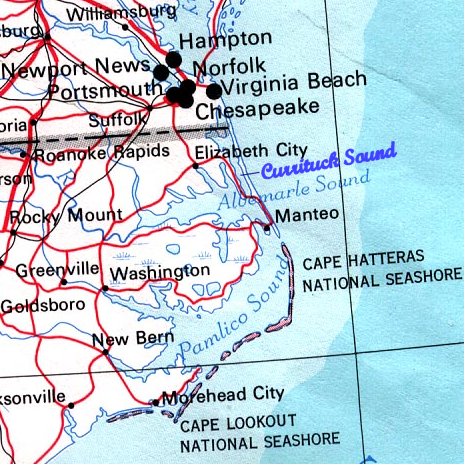
Map of northeastern North Carolina and southeastern Virginia showing Currituck Sound

Currituck Sound (/ˈkʊrɪtʌk/) is a lagoon located in northeastern part of North Carolina and extreme southeastern Virginia.

36 miles (58 km) long north-south and 8 miles (13 km) at its widest, this shallow, island-filled sound is separated from the Atlantic Ocean by the Currituck Banks Peninsula (formerly Bodie Island), part of the Outer Banks. On the northeast, it extends to Back Bay in southeast Virginia Beach, Virginia. A fork on the northwest leads to the Albemarle and Chesapeake Canal, which is a part of the Atlantic Intracoastal Waterway that connects the sound to Hampton Roads and the Chesapeake Bay. It ranges from 1 to 3 feet deep.

Although several inlets connected it directly to the Atlantic at one time or another, they have all since closed and there is now no direct access to the Ocean from the Sound. Thus contemporary salinity levels are very low, usually around 2-3‰ at the north end and 4-5‰ at the sound.

Currently, the only access to the ocean is through the Albemarle Sound, which joins the Currituck to the South, meaning that the sound has no lunar or solar tides. Instead, wind is the major force that moves water.

Currituck County's Mackay Island and Currituck National Wildlife Refuge as well as Back Bay National Wildlife Refuge and False Cape State Park in Virginia Beach border the sound and are winter habitats on the Atlantic Flyway. Many watersports activities occur in the sound, including parasailing, sea kayaking, and jet skiing. An area of barrier beaches, it is also noted for its duck and goose hunting.

== See also ==
- Carova Beach, North Carolina
- Corolla, North Carolina
- Currituck, North Carolina
- Duck, North Carolina
- Knotts Island, North Carolina
- Monkey Island, North Carolina
- Point Harbor, North Carolina
- Sandbridge, Virginia
- USS Currituck (AV-7), a World War II era seaplane tender named for the Currituck Sound
