= Knotts Island, North Carolina =

Island in the United States

Coordinates: 36°30′49″N 75°55′09″W

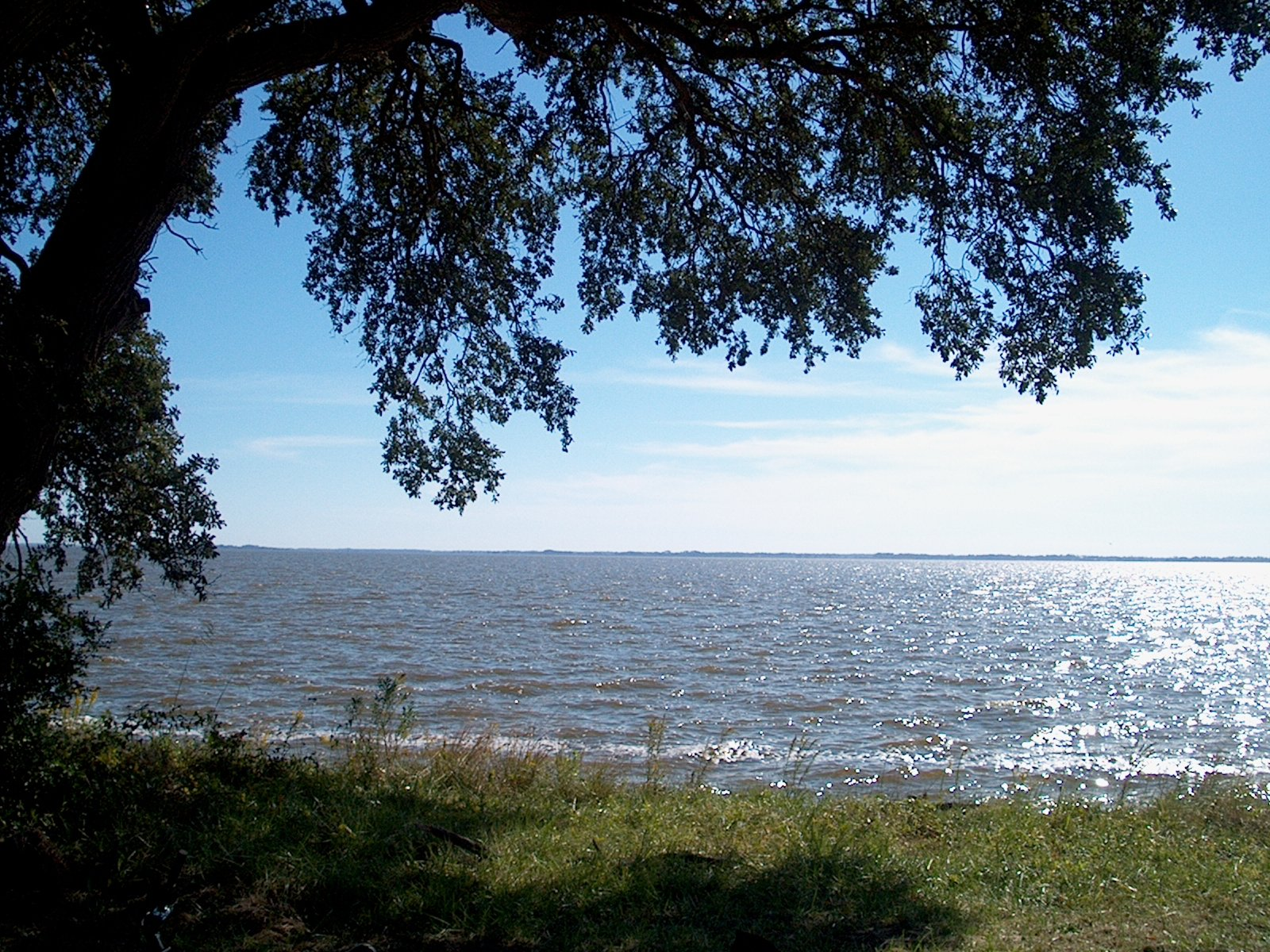
Currituck Sound as seen from Knotts Island

Knotts Island is a marshy island and a small unincorporated community. The island is shared by Currituck County, North Carolina and Virginia Beach, Virginia, United States, bounded by the Currituck Sound, North Landing River, Back Bay, and Knotts Island Bay. Knotts Island is home to Mackay Island National Wildlife Refuge. Knotts Island is accessible overland from Virginia Beach using Princess Anne Road, or by water from the Currituck County mainland; the North Carolina Department of Transportation operates a free ferry between Knotts Island and Currituck on the mainland. The ZIP Code for Knotts Island is 27950.

This island is a hunting and fishing community. It has numerous duck hunting blinds located in the bay as well as on land and is home to the Swan Island Hunting Club, a guided duck hunting club located across the bay on Swan Island. It is a favorite winter travel destination of artist/painter Bob Timberlake, among others.

Over the years, many residents of the former Outer Banks community of Wash Woods, Virginia moved across the sound to settle on Knotts Island. Eventually, Wash Woods became a ghost town, but descendants continue to live on Knotts Island to this day.

The island supports an elementary school, two churches, a post office, and a community park.

There are several businesses located on the island. Knotts Island Market is the original general store on the island. Next to the market now there is a Dollar General store. The only restaurant and bar on the island was Pearl's Bay Villa, commonly referred to as "Pearl's" in reference to the former owner. It is now closed, according to Google Maps. There are no lodgings except for a single Airbnb on Knotts Island Bay.

Knotts Island hosts a Peach Festival every year in June.
