= Currituck, North Carolina =

- Unincorporated community
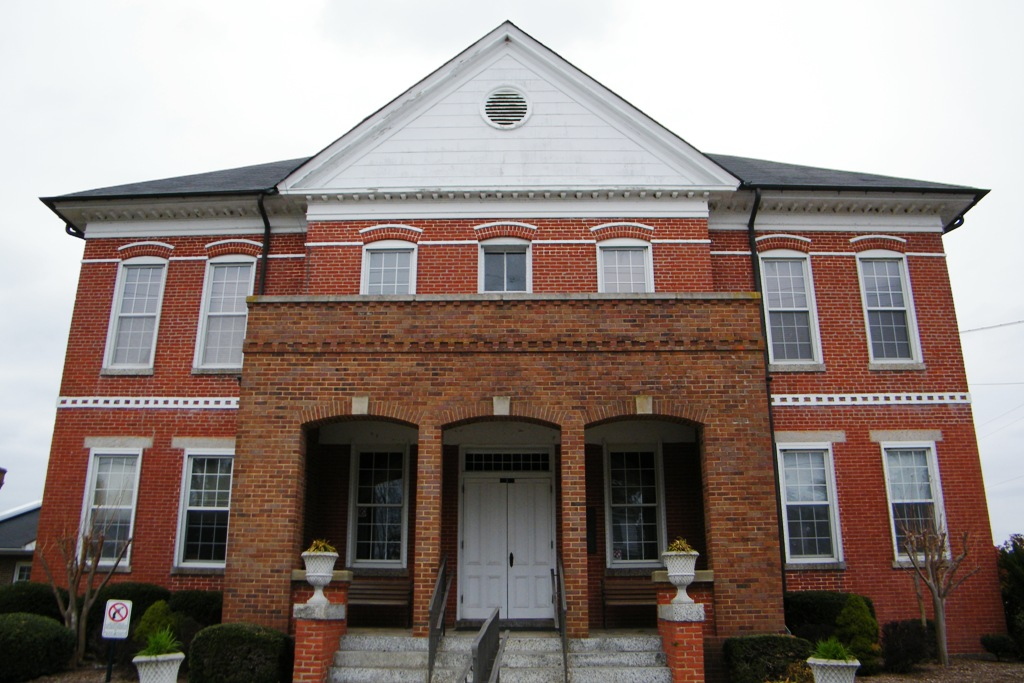
- Currituck County Courthouse

- Location of Currituck in North Carolina Currituck (the United States)
- Coordinates: 36°26′23″N 76°0′19″W
- Country: United States
- State: North Carolina
- County: Currituck
- Township: Crawford

Area
  - Total: 2.2 sq mi (5.6 km^{2})
  - Land: 2.1 sq mi (5.5 km^{2})
  - Water: 0.039 sq mi (0.1 km^{2})

Population (2000)
  - Total: 716
  - Density: 337/sq mi (130.2/km^{2})
- Time zone: UTC-5 (Eastern (EST))
  - Summer (DST): UTC-4 (EDT)
- ZIP code: 27929
- Area code: 252

Currituck (/ˈkʊrɪtʌk/) is an unincorporated community in extreme northeastern North Carolina, United States. Situated along the Currituck Sound, it serves as the county seat for Currituck County. Currituck is part of the Inner Banks region and is one of the state's few unincorporated county seats. The community harbors the Knotts Island Ferry, which provides free shuttles across the sound to Knotts Island. North Carolina Highway 168 (Caratoke Highway) and Courthouse Road are the community's most prominent roads. The Currituck Beach Lighthouse is not located on mainland Currituck but is located across the sound on the Outer Banks.

As early as the mid-18th century, the Currituck county seat was called Currituck Court House; the "Court House" suffix eroded over time.

The Currituck County Courthouse and Jail was listed on the National Register of Historic Places in 1979.

== Geography ==
Currituck is located at 36°26′23″N 76°0′19″W (36.439774, −76.005478). According to the United States Census Bureau, ZIP Code 27929 has a total area of 2.1 square miles (5.6 km^{2}), of which 2.1 square miles (5.5 km^{2}) is land and 0.0 square miles (0.1 km^{2}) is water.

=== Climate ===
Currituck lies in a humid subtropical climate zone and experiences four discernible seasons. It receives an average of 48.2 inches (1,220 mm) of precipitation each year, with the wettest season being July. In January 1985, Currituck experienced its lowest recorded temperature at -2 °F, while the hottest temperature was 107 °F in July 1942.

Climate data for Currituck, North Carolina
Month	Jan	Feb	Mar	Apr	May	Jun	Jul	Aug	Sep	Oct	Nov	Dec	Year
Mean daily maximum °F (°C)	52 (11)	55 (13)	63 (17)	72 (22)	79 (26)	86 (30)	89 (32)	88 (31)	83 (28)	74 (23)	65 (18)	56 (13)	72 (22)
Mean daily minimum °F (°C)	32 (0)	34 (1)	40 (4)	48 (9)	57 (14)	66 (19)	70 (21)	69 (21)	63 (17)	52 (11)	43 (6)	36 (2)	51 (10)
Average precipitation inches (mm)	4.40 (112)	3.28 (83)	4.03 (102)	3.07 (78)	4.14 (105)	4.31 (109)	5.59 (142)	5.47 (139)	4.55 (116)	3.32 (84)	2.97 (75)	3.07 (78)	48.2 (1,223)
Source: The Weather Channel

== Demographics ==
Currituck is neither an incorporated area nor a census-designated place, all the data is for the ZIP code 27929. As of the census of 2000, there were 716 people and 306 households residing in the community. The population density was 286.4 inhabitants per square mile (110.6/km^{2}). The racial makeup of the community was 97.6% White, 0.6% African American, 0.6% Asian, 1% from other races, and 0.6% from two or more races. Hispanic or Latino of any race were 2.1% of the population.

In the community, the population was spread out, with 23.9% under the age of 18, 60.6% from 18 to 64, and 15.5% who were 65 years of age or older. The median age was 42.6 years. The population was 52% male and 48% female.

The median income for a household in the community was $49,917, and the median income for a family was $53,542. The per capita income for the community was $22,264. About 7.9% of families and 7.4% of the population were below the poverty line.

== Notable people ==
- Linda Carter Brinson, journalist and writer
