= National Register of Historic Places listings in Currituck County, North Carolina =

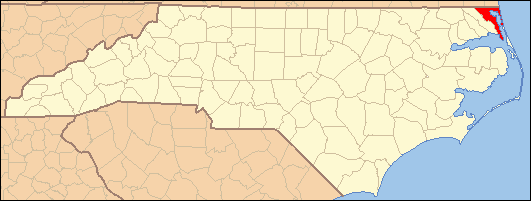

This list includes properties and districts listed on the National Register of Historic Places in Currituck County, North Carolina. Click the "Map of all coordinates" link to the right to view an online map of all properties and districts with latitude and longitude coordinates in the table below.

== Current listings ==
This National Park Service list is complete through NPS recent listings posted March 14, 2025.

	Name on the Register	Image	Date listed	Location	City or town	Description
1	Baum Site		December 8, 1980 (#80002818)	Address Restricted	Poplar Branch	
2	Coinjock Colored School	Coinjock Colored School	January 9, 2013 (#12001156)	4358 Caratoke Hwy. 36°21′46″N 75°58′00″W	Coinjock	
3	Culong	Culong	February 1, 1980 (#80002819)	South of Shawboro on SR 1147; 36°21′51″N 76°04′44″W	Shawboro	
4	Currituck Beach Lighthouse	Currituck Beach Lighthouse	October 15, 1973 (#73001333)	Northern North Carolina Outer Banks; also NC 12, north of NC 1185; 36°22′36″N 75°49′50″W	Corolla	Second location represents a boundary increase of January 12, 2000, the Currituck Beach Lighthouse Complex
5	Currituck County Courthouse and Jail	Currituck County Courthouse and Jail	May 10, 1979 (#79001697)	SR 1242; 36°27′00″N 76°01′01″W	Currituck	
6	Currituck Shooting Club		May 28, 1980 (#80002816)	South of Corolla; 36°17′08″N 75°48′13″W	Corolla	Oldest active shooting club in the United States; burned to the ground March 20, 2003
7	Flyway Club		May 12, 2015 (#15000238)	221 Marsh Causeway Rd. 36°32′31″N 76°00′17″W	Knotts Island	
8	Grandy School	Grandy School	September 25, 1998 (#98001210)	Junction of US 158 and Poplar Branch Rd. 36°14′29″N 75°52′42″W	Grandy	
9	Jarvisburg Colored School	Jarvisburg Colored School	December 11, 2009 (#09001104)	7301 NC 158; 36°11′11″N 75°51′52″W	Jarvisburg	
10	Shaw House	Shaw House	April 17, 1980 (#80002820)	NC 34 and SR 1203; 36°24′27″N 76°05′33″W	Shawboro	
11	Twin Houses	Twin Houses	April 13, 1972 (#72000959)	On NC 168 at the junction of SR 1203 and 1147; 36°24′19″N 76°05′38″W	Shawboro	
12	Wilson Walker House and Walker-Snowden Store		April 26, 2021 (#100006454)	150-158 Courthouse Rd. 36°26′59″N 76°00′57″W	Currituck	
13	Whalehead Club	Whalehead Club	April 16, 1980 (#80002817)	Currituck Banks; 36°22′27″N 75°50′01″W	Corolla	

== See also ==
- National Register of Historic Places listings in North Carolina
- List of National Historic Landmarks in North Carolina
