= Grandy =

Grandy may refer to:

- Grandy (surname)
- Grandy's, a restaurant chain based in Nashville, Tennessee
- Grandy, Minnesota
- Grandy, North Carolina
- Grandy, Virginia
- Grandy (ship, 1943), see Boats of the Mackenzie River watershed
- Grandy School, historic school building in North Carolina
