= USCGC Barberry =

US Coast Guard buoy tender

History

United States
- Name: Barberry
- Namesake: Barberry
- Cost: $172,557
- Launched: 14 November 1942
- Commissioned: 3 January 1943
- Decommissioned: 1 September 1970
- Identification: Hull number: WLI-294
- Fate: Transferred to the State of Maryland in 1971

General characteristics
- Class & type: Cosmos-class tender
- Displacement: 167 tons or 178 tons (full load)
- Length: 100 ft (30 m)
- Beam: 24 ft 7 in (7.49 m)
- Draft: 5 ft 4 in (1.63 m)
- Installed power: 2 x Murphy 6-cylinder diesel engines, 330 bhp (250 kW)
- Propulsion: two propellers
- Speed: 10 knots (19 km/h; 12 mph)
- Range: 3,000 nmi (5,600 km; 3,500 mi) at 6.5 knots (12.0 km/h; 7.5 mph)
- Complement: 16

USCGC Barberry (WLI-294) is a United States Coast Guard buoy tender that was donated to the state of Maryland in 1971. Based out of two locations in North Carolina and then Portsmouth, Virginia, during her Coast Guard career, the vessel was then used as an icebreaker by the Maryland Department of Natural Resources as the J. Millard Tawes. In 2020, the Maryland Department of Natural Resources announced that the vessel would be replaced; her replacement is expected to be commissioned in 2022.

== Construction and characteristics ==
USCGC Barberry was launched on 14 November 1942 at Dubuque, Iowa, having been constructed by the Dubuque Boat & Boiler Works. Her sponsor was Louise Landgraf. One of eight Cosmos-class tenders, she was operated by the United States Coast Guard. She was 100 feet (30 m) long, had a beam of 24 feet 7 inches (7.49 m), a draft of 5 feet 4 inches (1.63 m) and cost $172,557 to construct. She displaced either 167 or 178 tons. She had a crew of 16 and was equipped with a boom with a 5-ton capacity and an air-powered hoist; Barberry was not armed. The vessel had hull number WLI-294 and was named after the barberry, a type of shrub. Power was provided by two Murphy 6-cylinder diesel engines that provided 330 brake horsepower (250 kW) and drove two propellers. She could go at a top speed of 10 knots (19 km/h; 12 mph) and had a range of 3,000 nautical miles (5,600 km; 3,500 mi) at 6.5 knots (12.0 km/h; 7.5 mph).

== Career ==
Commissioned on 3 January 1943, she was assigned to the 5th District of the Coast Guard and operated out of Morehead City, North Carolina. During World War II, she provided aid to navigational duties. On 6 January 1945 she was transferred to Coinjock, North Carolina, and then to Portsmouth, Virginia, on 16 May 1950. Generally, she provided aid to navigation and search and rescue, as well as serving as a buoy tender. More specifically, she patrolled a boat race at Washington, D.C. in 1955, helped search for an aircraft off Stingray Point in 1956, aided a grounded yacht in 1958, and served as an icebreaker off Crisfield, Maryland, in 1959 and 1961. Declared surplus, she was decommissioned on 1 September 1970 and donated to the state of Maryland on 23 February 1971

Barberry entered service for the Maryland Department of Natural Resources in 1972 and was renamed J. Millard Tawes, after a former Governor of Maryland. The largest vessel used by the Maryland Department of Natural Resources as of 2020, the vessel was used for icebreaking around Crisfield Harbor and Smith Island, as well as being the backup icebreaker for the Port of Salisburg. It was also used to transport buoy weights are marked natural resource areas, and can provide evacuation services for Smith Island in case weather necessitates that. In March 2020, the Maryland Department of Natural Resources announced that the vessel would be retired, as maintenance was becoming difficult, partially because many of the major parts of the ship such as the engines had seen their manufacture discontinued decades earlier. As of March 2022, J. Millard Tawes has not been retired, with her replacement, MV Eddie Somers, expected to be commissioned later in the year. Eddie Somers was placed into service in September 2022.
