= William N. H. Smith =

American judge

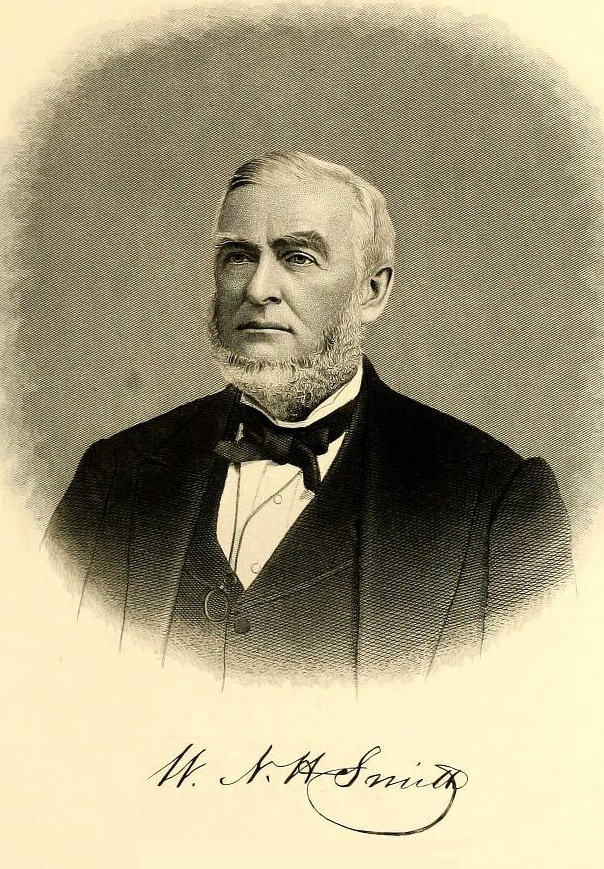

Chief Justice of the North Carolina Supreme Court
- In office 1878–1889
- Preceded by: Richmond Mumford Pearson
- Succeeded by: Augustus Summerfield Merrimon

Member of the C.S. House of Representatives from North Carolina's 1st district
- In office 1862–1865

Member of the U.S. House of Representatives from North Carolina's 1st district
- In office March 4, 1859 – March 3, 1861
- Preceded by: Henry M. Shaw
- Succeeded by: John R. French

Member of the North Carolina Senate
- In office 1848–1848

Personal details
- Born: September 24, 1812 Murfreesboro, North Carolina
- Died: November 14, 1889 (aged 77) Raleigh, North Carolina
- Resting place: Historic Oakwood Cemetery
- Party: Democratic; Opposition (1859–1861)
- Education: Yale College; Yale Law School

William Nathan Harrell Smith (September 24, 1812 – November 14, 1889) was an American politician and lawyer who served as a United States representative from North Carolina, and as the chief justice of the North Carolina Supreme Court.

== Biography ==
William N. H. Smith was born in Murfreesboro, North Carolina, September 24, 1812, and attended the common schools in Murfreesboro, N.C., Kingston, Rhode Island, and Colchester, Connecticut and East Lyme, Connecticut. He graduated from Yale College in 1834 and from Yale Law School in 1836, and was admitted to the bar and commenced practice in Murfreesboro, N.C., in 1839.

Smith held several local offices, including being a member of the State House of Commons in 1840, 1858, 1865, and 1866. He also served in the State Senate in 1848; was solicitor (prosecutor) of the first judicial district of North Carolina for eight years, and was elected as an Opposition Party candidate to the Thirty-sixth Congress (March 4, 1859 – March 3, 1861). He was unsuccessful candidate (backed by the American Party and many Democrats) for Speaker. He served in the Confederate Congress in 1862–1865, and was delegate to the Democratic National Convention at New York City in 1868. He served as counsel for Governor W. W. Holden in his 1871 impeachment trial, and was chief justice of the North Carolina Supreme Court from 1878 to 1889.

Smith died in Raleigh, North Carolina, November 14, 1889, and his remains were interred in Historic Oakwood Cemetery.

U.S. House of Representatives
Preceded by Robert T. Paine	Member of the U.S. House of Representatives from North Carolina's 1st congressional district 1859–1861	Succeeded by John R. French
Legal offices
Preceded by Richmond Mumford Pearson	Chief Justice of North Carolina Supreme Court; 1878–1889	Succeeded by Augustus S. Merrimon
