= Henry M. Shaw =

American politician

Henry Marchmore Shaw
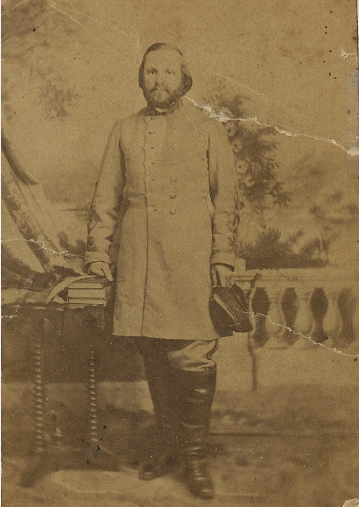

Personal details
- Born: November 20, 1819 Newport, Rhode Island, US
- Died: February 1, 1864 (aged 44) Batchelder's Creek, North Carolina
- Resting place: Shaw Family Cemetery, Shawboro, North Carolina, US

Military service
- Allegiance: Confederate States
- Branch/service: Confederate States Army
- Years of service: 1861-1864
- Rank: Colonel
- Unit: 8th Regiment, North Carolina Troops
- Battles/wars: American Civil War

Henry Marchmore Shaw (November 20, 1819 – February 1, 1864) was a congressional representative from North Carolina, as well as an officer in the Confederate States Army during the American Civil War. He was killed in action, one of a handful of former U.S. congressmen to perish during the conflict.

== Early life ==
Henry M. Shaw was born in Newport, Rhode Island, November 20, 1819. His parents were John Allen and Elizabeth Marchmore Shaw of Newport. His father was a silversmith with interests in the West Indies trade out of Newport. The family moved to North Carolina after his father lost ships and a good portion of his livelihood to the British in the War of 1812. It's said that his brother, Silas Gardner Shaw, took the lighthouse keeper position at Beavertail Lighthouse (1858–1862, 1863–1869) to avoid fighting against his brother in the war. Their mother died in 1829, Silas at 6 years old was sent back to Newport to live with relatives; Henry stayed in North Carolina with his father. Henry completed preparatory studies and graduated from the medical department of the University of Pennsylvania at Philadelphia in 1838. He began his medical practice in Indiantown, North Carolina.

== Congress ==
He was elected as a Democrat to the Thirty-third Congress (March 4, 1853–March 3, 1855). Shaw was an unsuccessful candidate for reelection to the Thirty-fourth Congress. He was elected to the Thirty-fifth Congress (March 4, 1857–March 3, 1859) and was an unsuccessful candidate for reelection to the Thirty-sixth Congress.

Henry debated "The Kansas Question" in April 1858; his brother Silas would take the government job at Beavertail Lighthouse in December of that same year. He was a vocal secessionist who called for North Carolina's secession from the Union even prior to Lincoln's election in 1860. He signed the North Carolina Ordinance of Secession on May 21, 1861, with a quill pen he made especially for that purpose. The pen is on display at the North Carolina Museum of History located in Raleigh. The North Carolinians had convened the day before, marking the 86th anniversary of the Mecklenburg Declaration of Independence.

== Civil War ==
With the outbreak of the Civil War, Shaw enlisted in the Confederate army and was appointed as a colonel. He was in command of the Confederate forces at the Battle of Roanoke Island. In January 1862, General Ambrose E. Burnside leading New England Federal forces (including many Rhode Islanders) with about sixty ships and over 13,000 men began to enter Hatteras inlet, and assembled in Pamlico Sound. On February 6, 1862, Burnside's forces entered Roanoke Harbor. On the morning of February 8 Burnside's forces landed on the south end of Roanoke Island and advanced towards the north. From the Fort Raleigh National Historic Site website "Coming around the turn in the road, the Union forces saw their first view of the island's main defense – the three-gun battery. This battery, sitting astride the road, was thirty-five yards wide with a water-filled ditch eight feet wide and three feet deep guarding the front. Supporting the three guns were about 1,000 poorly armed soldiers from various regiments."

Colonel Shaw and his men put up a valiant struggle, but were eventually overwhelmed by the Federal forces which had five times the number of men. Colonel Shaw surrendered to avoid a massacre of his men. Although Roanoke was considered a small battle in the larger picture of the Civil War, it was a pivotal turning point in Northern support for the war; prior to that the North had not had much success and public support of the war was waning.

Shaw was paroled and the North Carolina Eighth reorganized in the fall of 1862. Colonel Shaw took command once again leading forces in Charleston, Wilmington, and the trenches of Petersburg, Virginia.

On February 1, 1864, in the early morning hours, at Batchelder's Creek, while assembling on the road for the expedition to New Bern, he was shot from his horse. The bullet entered his cheek and traversed his head killing him instantly. His body was recovered and interred in the cemetery at Shawboro, North Carolina; the town of Shawboro was named in his honor.

U.S. House of Representatives
Preceded by Thomas L. Clingman	Member of the U.S. House of Representatives from North Carolina's 1st congressional district 1853–1855	Succeeded by Robert T. Paine
Preceded by Robert T. Paine	Member of the U.S. House of Representatives from North Carolina's 1st congressional district 1857–1859	Succeeded by William N. H. Smith
