= Lee's Famous Recipe Chicken =

American casual dining franchise

LFR Chicken LLC
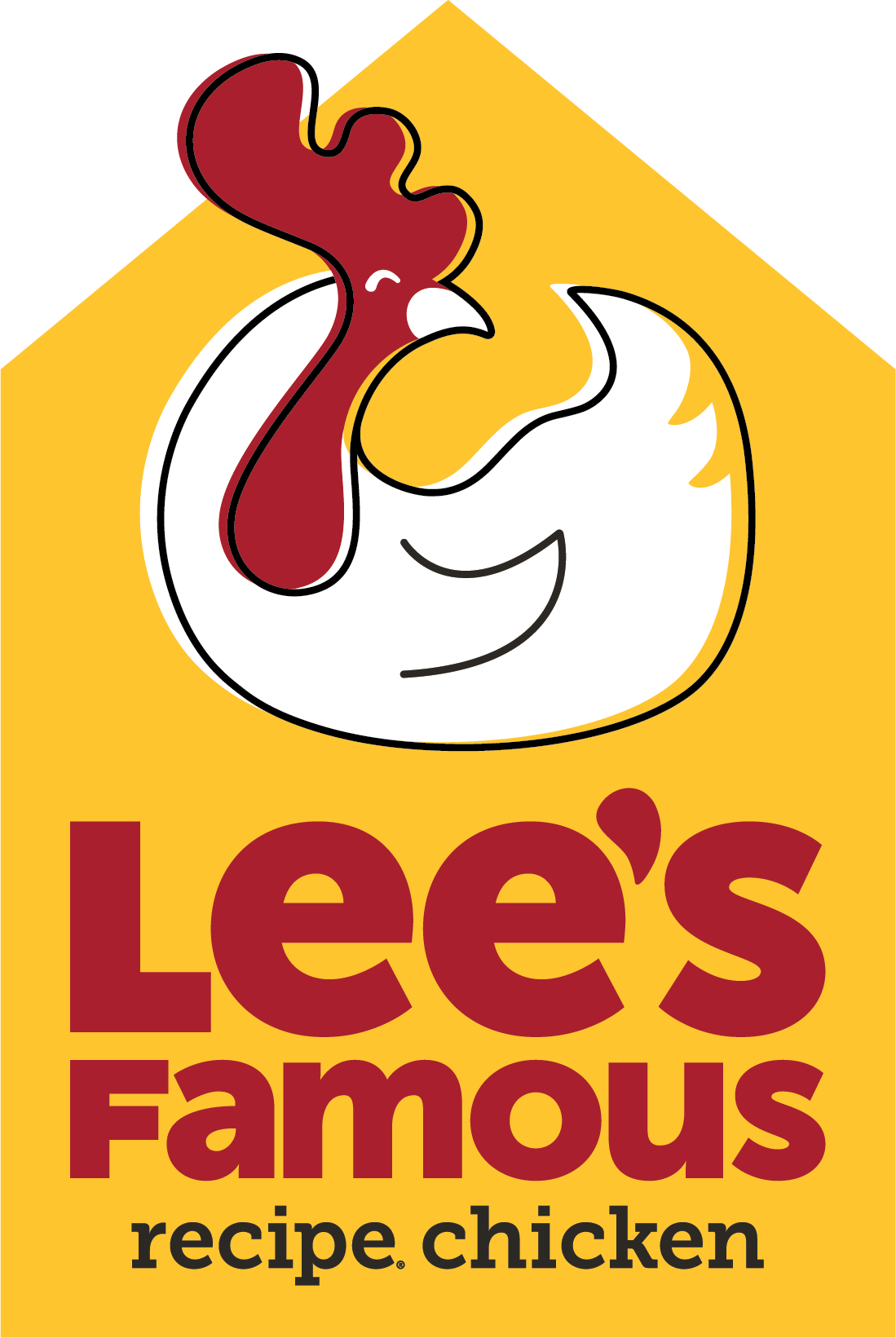
- Trade name: Lee's Famous Recipe Chicken
- Type: Private; subsidiary company
- Industry: Restaurants
- Genre: Fast food
- Founded: 1966; 60 years ago
- Founder: Lee Cummings
- Headquarters: Fort Walton Beach, Florida, U.S.
- Number of locations: 131
- Area served: Worldwide, but primarily Midwest
- Key people: Ryan Weaver (CEO)
- Products: Chicken, biscuits
- Services: Catering
- Revenue: System-Wide Sales US$229 million (2023)
- Owner: Ryan Weaver, Artemis Lane LP
- Number of employees: 500 (2023)
- Parent: Artemis Restaurant Corp
- Website: leesfamousrecipe.com

Lee's Famous Recipe Chicken is a quick service restaurant franchise founded in 1966 specializing in chicken, homestyle sides, and biscuits.

== History ==
After the sale of KFC in 1964, Lee Cummings (the nephew of KFC founder Colonel Harland Sanders) began developing his recipe, later to be known as "Famous Recipe." In 1966, Cummings, along with Harold Omer, started "Harold's Take-Home" in Lima, Ohio, where Cummings first introduced his Famous Recipe Chicken. Later that year, Cummings opened the restaurant's first franchise in Columbus, Ohio. Locations in Springfield, Dayton, and Cincinnati, Ohio, followed in the coming years, as well as a unit in Kalamazoo, Michigan.

In 1981, Cummings sold the chain to Shoney's Restaurants in Nashville, Tennessee. He died in 2002 at the age of 80. Shoney's continued to operate Lee's along with their own Captain D's and Shoney's Restaurants until 1995, when Lee's was sold to RTM Restaurant Group in Atlanta, Georgia.

In May 2003, the chain had 29 company-owned locations and 125 franchised locations. In October 2003, Lee's Famous Recipes Inc. purchased the chain from RTM. In April 2013, Famous Recipe Group LLC purchased the chain from Lee's Famous Recipes, Inc.

In June 2021, Famous Recipe Group, LLC, brand owner of Lee's Famous Recipe Chicken, agreed to sell the brand to LFR Chicken, LLC a new entity backed by Artemis Lane Partners.

== See also ==
- Fast food
- List of chicken restaurants
