= Corolla, North Carolina =

Unincorporated community in North Carolina, U.S.

Coordinates: 36°22′53″N 75°49′59″W

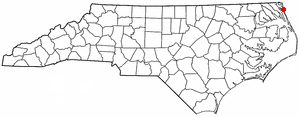
Location of Corolla, North Carolina

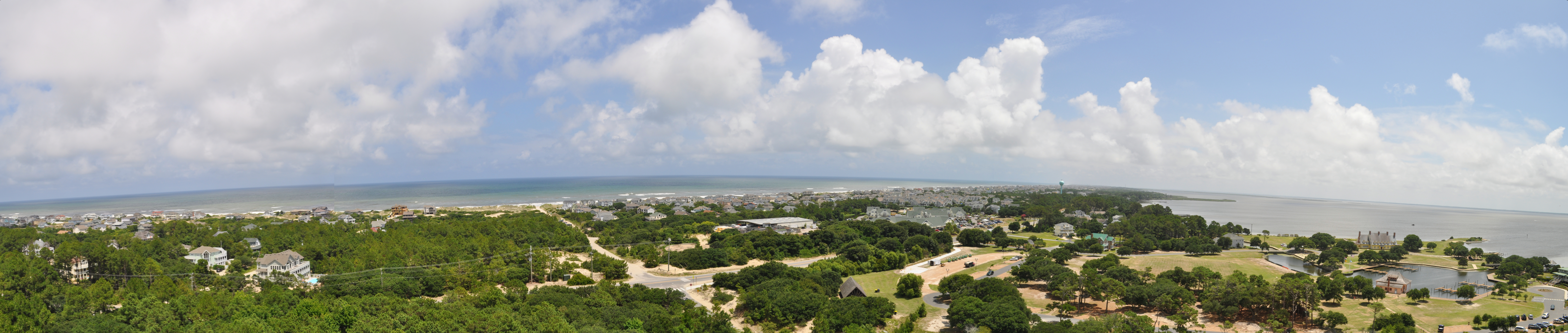
Overview from the Currituck Lighthouse

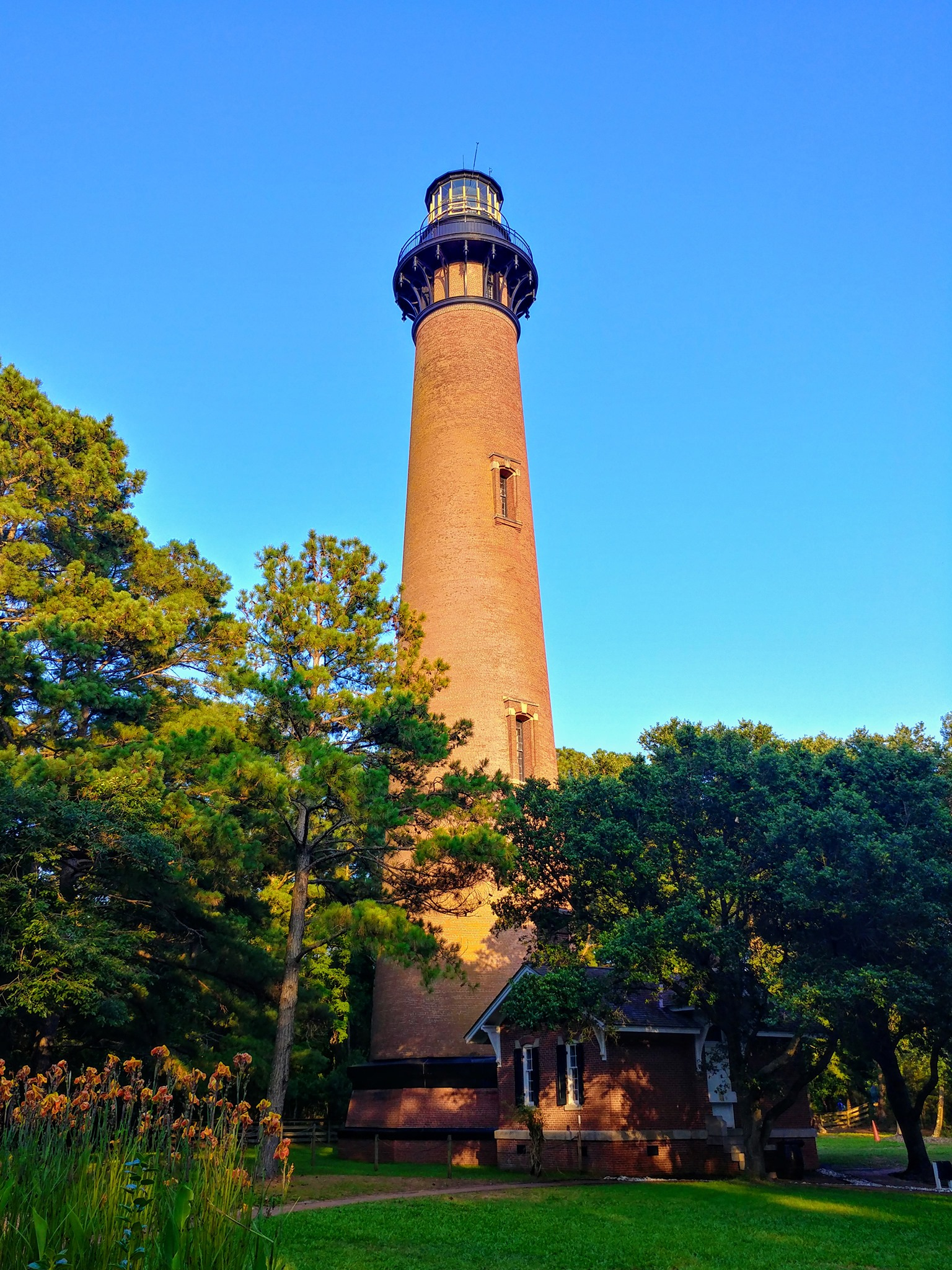
Currituck Beach Lighthouse in Corolla, NC

Corolla (/kəˈrɑːlə/ kuh-RAHL-uh) is an unincorporated community located in Poplar Branch township, Currituck County, North Carolina, United States, along the northern Outer Banks. According to the census data compiled by the United States Postal Service in 2020, it has a permanent population of approximately 1279 people; during the summer vacation season, the population surges into the thousands. Corolla is home to the Currituck Beach Lighthouse, one of the seven North Carolina coastal lighthouses.

Previously a quiet and little-known location, a development boom in the 1980s sparked growth in the area, and since then, Corolla has become a popular vacation destination. Resting between the Currituck Sound and the Atlantic Ocean, Corolla attracts mainly beach-goers, especially in the summer months. Corolla is home to numerous attractions such as the historic Whalehead Club, Currituck Beach Light, Center for Wildlife Education, and is known for its numerous locations for shopping, dining, and participating in water sports.

Corolla is home to a herd of feral Banker horses, which are direct descendants of Spanish mustangs brought in the 16th century. They are located on a 12,000-acre (49 km^{2}) animal sanctuary situated north of the populated areas of Corolla. Over fifty thousand people come to see these wild horses every week in the summer months.

== Etymology ==
Named for the collection of petals of a flower, the correct pronunciation has an emphasis on the second syllable, rah (kuh-RAH-luh, /kəˈrɑːlə/); however, many visitors incorrectly pronounce Corolla the same way they pronounce the name of the Toyota Corolla, with the second syllable sounding like row (kuh-ROW-luh, /kəˈroʊlə/).

== History ==
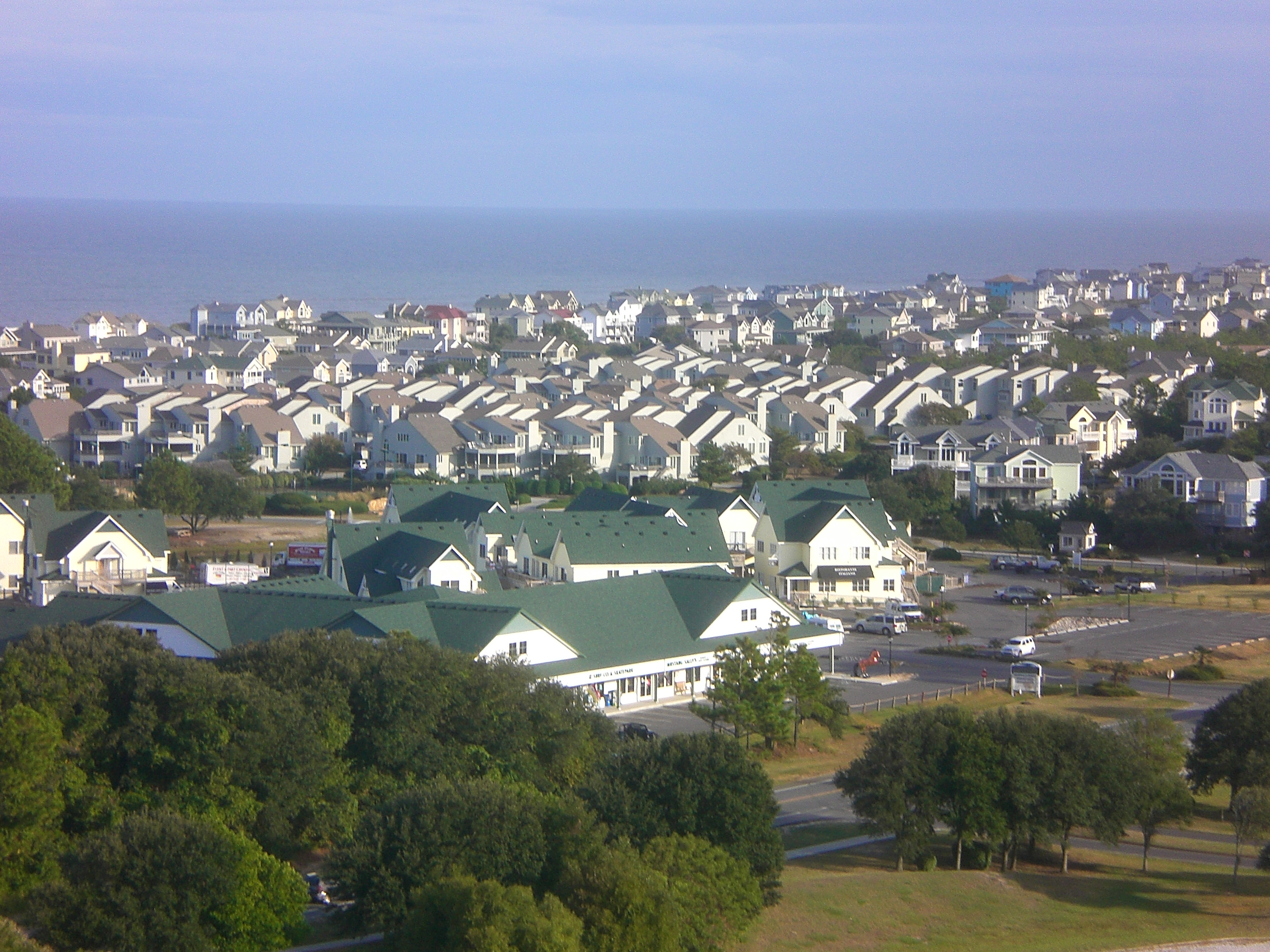
Corolla, as viewed from the Currituck Beach Lighthouse

The community of Corolla began as a European development on American Indian hunting grounds. Tribes including the Chowanoke and Poteskeet hunted along the barrier island.

The town of Corolla was first called Jones Hill, after an early settler. It was also known as Whalehead or Currituck Beach. Early settlers made a living from fishing and hunting, as well as from salvage from shipwrecks and serving as guides to hunters.

Currituck was derived from an American Indian term, Carotank, meaning land of the wild geese. On the Atlantic migratory flyway, the area at the time had a large wild geese population. Over hunting in the late 19th century caused numbers to severely drop.

The town officially took the name Corolla in 1895 when a post office opened in the community. The name was chosen to refer to the botanic term for the petals of a flower. It wasn't until 1905 however, that a teacher and curriculum were provided to the local school.

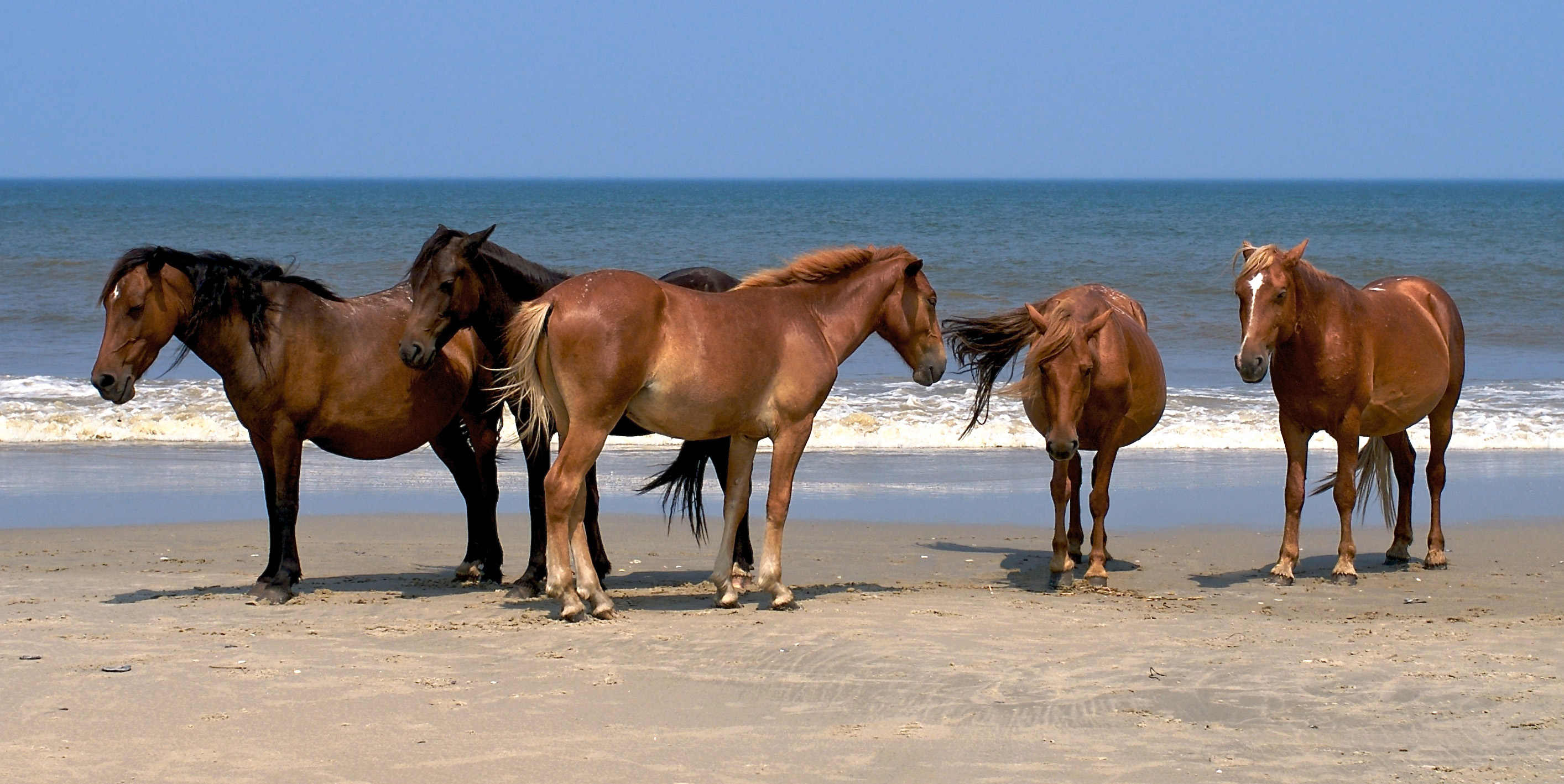
Banker horses of Corolla

Development of Currituck's Northern Outer Banks began in 1967 when investors from Sandbridge, Virginia, put together an investment group to purchase undeveloped land. The first subdivision plotted was Carova with 1,993 lots. The lots were originally priced in the early 1970s at $8,000; as of 2006, some of these lots are worth up to $500,000.

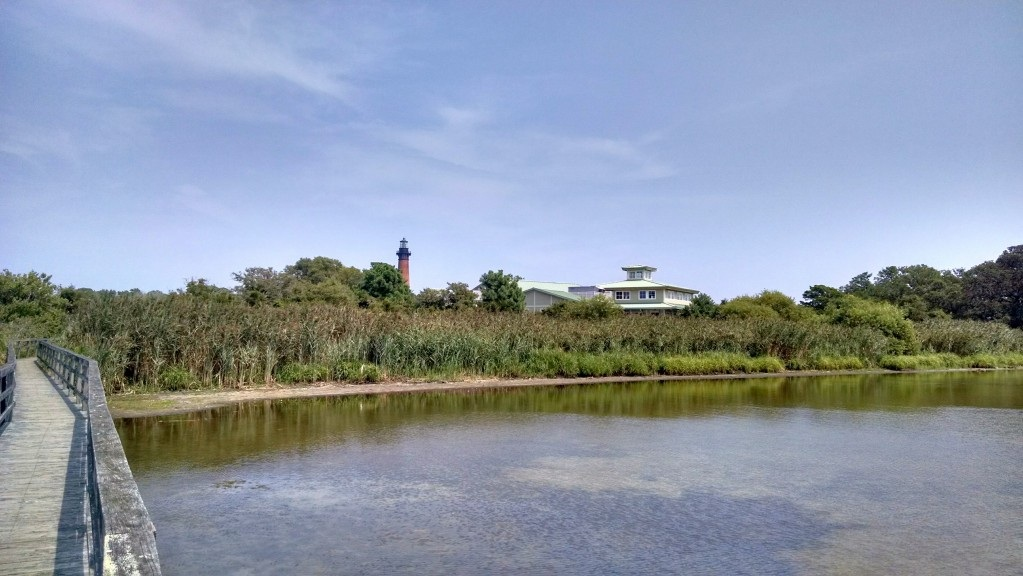
Currituck Heritage Park which houses the Outer Banks Center for Wildlife Education

The investors planned for a road to come through from Virginia Beach, Virginia, to allow access to the lots; however, these plans were abandoned in 1973 when the Back Bay National Wildlife Refuge south of Sandbridge was closed to all vehicular traffic, except by permit. Development pushed south through the 1970s, creating well over 1,000 additional lots in several subdivisions. In 1984 the residents of Corolla succeeded in their attempts to gain a public access road from the south. The state began paving the extension of NC-12 toward the north.

In addition to the Currituck Beach Light, the Currituck Shooting Club and Whalehead Club are listed on the National Register of Historic Places.

== Demographics ==
Corolla is a diverse place, with its native residents describing themselves as belonging to various ethnic groups. The greatest number among them are white, followed by African Americans. Significant ancestries of people in Corolla include English, German, Italian, and Polish. The principal language spoken is English, but Spanish and Italian are other popular languages. Per capita income in Corolla is $48,670. 52.80% of the adult population has a four-year degree or equivalent, while in other parts of the United States the average is 21.84%.

== Parks and nature preserves ==
Corolla is home to the Outer Banks Center for Wildlife Education, located in Currituck Heritage Park. The park has a boardwalk through wetlands. It is listed as an eBird hotspot, with at least 219 species recorded in the park since 2000. Less than a mile north of Corolla is the Currituck Banks North Carolina National Estuarine Research Reserve.

== Beaches ==
There are 15 beaches with public access, of which six have lifeguards and public parking and two include showers:

- Corolla Village Road (shower, bathhouse)
- Shad Street
- Sturgeon Walkway
- Bonito Street
- Sailfish Walkway
- Yaupon Lane (shower, bathhouse)

== Climate ==
According to the Köppen climate classification, Corolla has a Humid subtropical climate (Cfa).

Climate data for Corolla, 1991–2020 normals, extremes 1981–2022
Month	Jan	Feb	Mar	Apr	May	Jun	Jul	Aug	Sep	Oct	Nov	Dec	Year
Record high °F (°C)	75.1 (23.9)	75.5 (24.2)	84.9 (29.4)	87.4 (30.8)	93.1 (33.9)	95.4 (35.2)	94.4 (34.7)	95.6 (35.3)	95.1 (35.1)	89.3 (31.8)	81.6 (27.6)	77.4 (25.2)	95.6 (35.3)
Mean daily maximum °F (°C)	50.2 (10.1)	51.5 (10.8)	57.2 (14.0)	66.0 (18.9)	73.4 (23.0)	80.9 (27.2)	84.6 (29.2)	83.2 (28.4)	78.4 (25.8)	70.2 (21.2)	60.9 (16.1)	54.1 (12.3)	67.6 (19.8)
Mean daily minimum °F (°C)	36.3 (2.4)	37.4 (3.0)	42.8 (6.0)	51.8 (11.0)	60.6 (15.9)	69.7 (20.9)	74.2 (23.4)	73.2 (22.9)	68.9 (20.5)	58.4 (14.7)	47.4 (8.6)	40.5 (4.7)	55.2 (12.9)
Record low °F (°C)	−0.2 (−17.9)	10.5 (−11.9)	21.7 (−5.7)	31.3 (−0.4)	43.2 (6.2)	52.9 (11.6)	60.9 (16.1)	57.6 (14.2)	52.3 (11.3)	39.4 (4.1)	27.3 (−2.6)	10.2 (−12.1)	−0.2 (−17.9)
Average precipitation inches (mm)	3.76 (96)	3.13 (80)	3.77 (96)	3.50 (89)	3.70 (94)	4.14 (105)	5.64 (143)	5.59 (142)	5.33 (135)	4.01 (102)	3.41 (87)	3.76 (96)	49.74 (1,263)
Average dew point °F (°C)	34.5 (1.4)	35.2 (1.8)	39.9 (4.4)	48.7 (9.3)	57.8 (14.3)	66.4 (19.1)	71.4 (21.9)	70.4 (21.3)	65.8 (18.8)	55.9 (13.3)	45.7 (7.6)	39.1 (3.9)	52.7 (11.5)
Source: PRISM

Climate data for Duck NC, Ocean Water Temperature, 1991–2020 normals
Month	Jan	Feb	Mar	Apr	May	Jun	Jul	Aug	Sep	Oct	Nov	Dec	Year
Daily mean °F (°C)	45.8 (7.7)	43.6 (6.4)	46.3 (7.9)	52.0 (11.1)	60.0 (15.6)	67.6 (19.8)	70.3 (21.3)	73.8 (23.2)	75.1 (23.9)	68.8 (20.4)	59.6 (15.3)	52.2 (11.2)	59.7 (15.4)
Source: NOAA

== Ecology ==
According to the A. W. Kuchler U.S. potential natural vegetation types, Corolla, North Carolina would have a dominant vegetation type of Northern Cordgrass (73) with a dominant vegetation form of Coastal plain (20).

Preceded by Currituck Beach	Beaches of The Outer Banks	Succeeded by Duck
