= Captain D's =

U.S.-based restaurant chain

Captain Ds, LLC.

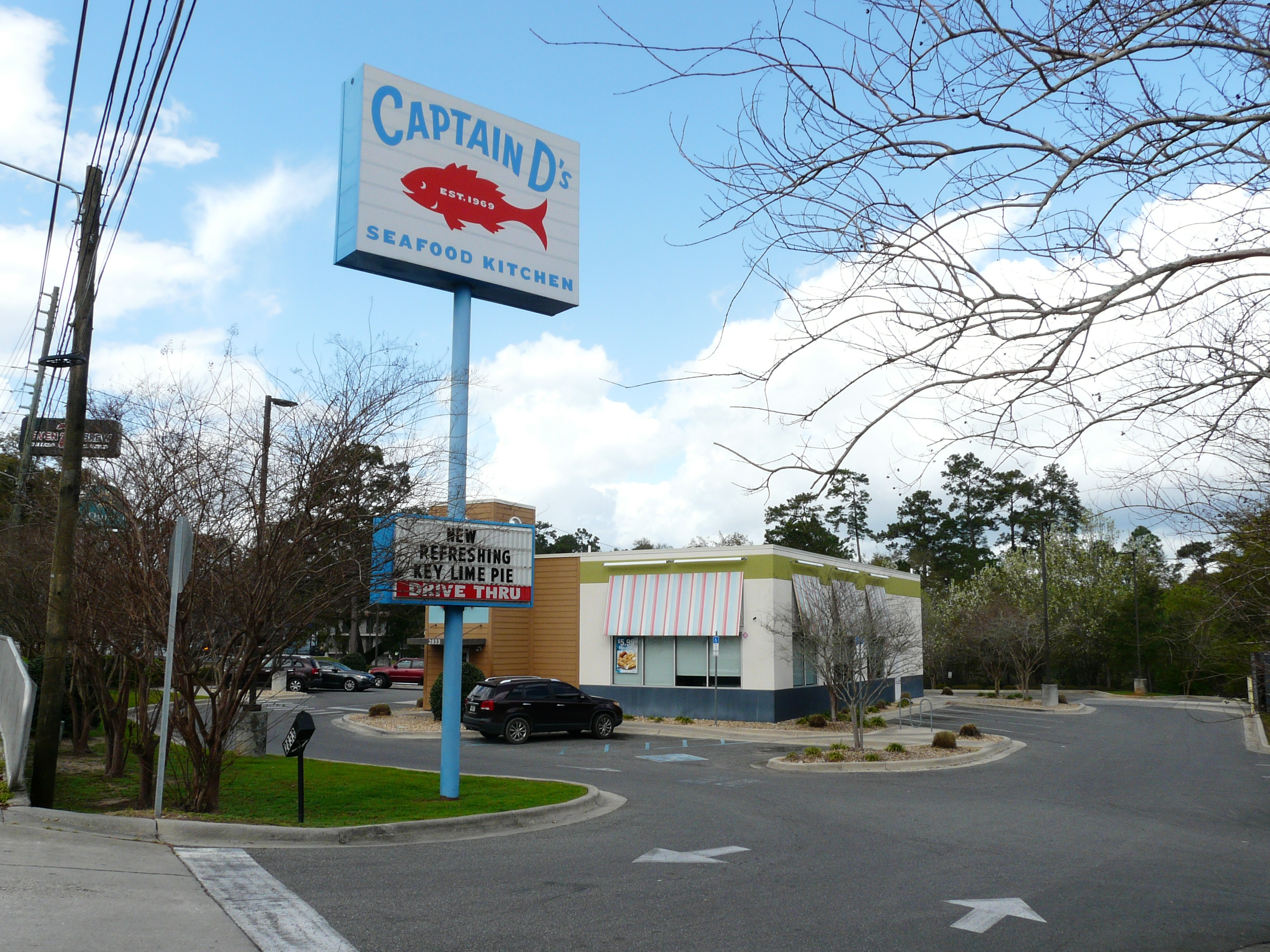
- Captain D's in Tallahassee, Florida
- Trade name: Captain D's
- Formerly: Mr. D's Seafood and Hamburgers (1969–1975)
- Type: Private
- Industry: Restaurants Franchising
- Genre: Fast casual
- Founded: August 15, 1969; 57 years ago in Donelson, Tennessee, U.S.
- Founder: Raymond L. Danner, Sr.
- Headquarters: Nashville, Tennessee, U.S.
- Revenue: ▲US$544.43 million (2016)
- Owner: Centre Partners
- Number of employees: 6,000
- Website: captainds.com

Captain D's, LLC. is an American fast casual restaurant chain that specializes in seafood and is headquartered in Nashville, Tennessee. The chain was founded as Mr. D's Seafood and Hamburgers by Raymond L. Danner Sr. on August 15, 1969, in Donelson, Tennessee. The chain is currently owned by private-equity firm Centre Partners. Captain D's currently has more than 500 locations in the United States.

== History ==
Mr. D's Seafood and Hamburgers opened in 1969 after entrepreneur, owner of Danner Foods and KFC franchisee Raymond L. Danner Sr. was unable to expand the territory of his Shoney's Big Boy Restaurants franchise, which was limited to 11 states in the Southeast. In 1971, Danner and his Shoney's co-founder Alex Schoenbaum completed a merger between Shoney's and Danner Foods and named their new company Shoney's Big Boy Enterprises. In 1975, Danner was president of the company, which announced the renaming of Mr. D's Seafood and Hamburgers as "Captain D's" and the launch of a national franchising program. By this time, Captain D's menu was edited to focus on seafood and side dishes, and the chain had expanded to 32 locations that earned more than $10 million annually. In 1976, Captain D's was held by the rebranded Shoney's Inc., after Danner and Schoenbaum sold the Big Boy trademark to Marriott Corporation.

Throughout the 1970s, the company grew rapidly and added special programs like the Kids' Birthday Club and children's comic books. During the 1980s and 1990s, the company's logo and building design evolved.

On September 13, 2010, Phil Greifeld was appointed CEO of Captain D's.

Throughout 2016, Captain D's experienced a surge of franchise and corporate development, with 13 new locations opened, along with numerous development agreements signed to open additional restaurants. This ongoing growth expanded the brand's presence, including in Alabama, Arkansas, Florida, Georgia, Illinois, Kentucky, Louisiana, North Carolina, South Carolina, Michigan, Tennessee, Texas, and Virginia.

=== Acquisitions ===
In January 2005, Sagittarius Brand, Inc. acquired Captain D's for $150 million. To gain capital, the holding company sold Captain D's to buyout firm Sun Capital Partners, Inc in 2010.

After Spectrum Restaurant Group Inc. filed for chapter 11 bankruptcy in 2006, Captain D's bought its restaurant chain Grandy's as a subsidiary.

In 2013, Sun Capital Partners Inc. sold Captain D's to its affiliate, Centre Partners Management.

In 2017, Centre Partners sold the chain to Sentinel Capital Partners.

In 2022, Sentinel Capital Partners sold Captain D's back to Centre Partners.

== Products ==
Captain D's offers fried fish, shrimp, lobster, crab and chicken meals, platters and sandwiches. The fish and shrimp options come grilled or fried. The appetizers include fried mozzarella sticks, jalapeño poppers, clam strips and butterfly shrimp. The side dishes include coleslaw, French fries, green beans, okra, broccoli, baked potato, corn, mac & cheese and hush puppies. The dessert menu includes cheesecake, chocolate cake, and funnel cake stix.

In 2019, PepsiCo announced that it would partner with Captain D's as its only beverage supplier.

As of 2021, Captain D's restaurants are sourced by 60 food suppliers.

== Operations ==
In 2020, Captain D's announced its Express prototype, a 960-square-foot building model with drive-thru and walkup windows only. The first Express unit was set to open in College Park, Georgia, in 2021.

In 2021, Captain D's announced the debut of its double drive-thru in Tupelo, Mississippi.

== Controversies ==
In April 1989, the NAACP Legal Defense and Educational Fund filed a class-action lawsuit against Danner and more than 200 other Shoney's Inc. officials for allegedly implementing discriminatory policies against black people who sought employment or were then employed with Shoney's Inc. restaurants—Shoney's, Captain D's, Lee's Famous Recipe Chicken, Pargo's and the Fifth Quarter. Nine former employees and job applicants of Shoney's Inc. restaurants sought more than $500 million as well as an affirmative action plan authorized by the court to prevent discriminatory policies in the future. In November 1992, Captain D's was involved in the $105 million settlement of the racial discrimination case against then-parent company Shoney's Inc. and Danner agreed to contribute $65 million of the company's stock toward the settlement amount. The settlement was awarded to the more than 40,000 former, then-current and prospective restaurant employees who claimed they were discriminated against or were ordered to engage in discriminatory practices between February 1988 and April 1991.

== See also ==
- List of seafood restaurants
