= Flyway Club =

- U.S. National Register of Historic Places
- Location within North Carolina Location within the United States
- Location: 221 Marsh Causeway Rd., Knotts Island, North Carolina
- Coordinates: 36°32′31″N 76°0′17″W
- Area: 26 acres (11 ha)
- Built: 1920
- NRHP reference No.: 15000238
- Added to NRHP: May 12, 2015

The Flyway Club is a historic shooting club at 221 Marsh Causeway in Knotts Island, North Carolina. Located on more than 400 acres (160 ha) facing Currituck Sound on the west side of Knotts Island, it is one of the oldest surviving fowl hunting clubs in the state. Its main lodge was built about 1920, and rebuilt in a near replica in 1960 after being destroyed by fire. The lodge also includes a large U-shaped farm building, also built about 1920, that housed the club staff and farming equipment. The club was established by Ogden Mills Reid, and remained in the Reid family until 2013, when it was acquired by the Conservation Fund.

Twenty-six acres of the club's property was listed on the National Register of Historic Places in 2015.

== See also ==
- National Register of Historic Places listings in Currituck County, North Carolina
