= Grandy's =

American restaurant chain

- Type: Private subsidiary
- Industry: Restaurant Franchising
- Founded: 1972; 54 years ago
- Headquarters: Nashville, Tennessee
- Area served: United States
- Products: Country style food
- Parent: Captain D's
- Website: grandys.com

Grandy's Country Cookin' (shortened to Grandy's) is a homestyle cooking and comfort food restaurant chain based in Nashville, Tennessee.

== History ==
Walter E. Johnson and Rex E. Sanders had met working together as teenagers at a restaurant in Oak Cliff, Dallas. In the early 1960s, they opened a fried chicken stand on Grand Avenue, which expanded. In 1969, Host International purchased the 14 outlets to use for their expansion of Jim Dandy Fried Chicken. After launching and selling a successful chain of restaurants, the two young men created Grandy's, hoping to combine the efficiency of fast food with the ambiance of a full-service restaurant. Johnson and Sanders waited until a non-compete clause before renaming the chain to Grandy's in 1977.

Under the ownership of Saga Foods, Inc. a multi-concept restaurant firm who acquired Grandy's in 1983, Grandy's experienced its greatest growth surge, primarily in the 1980s, having at its zenith almost 200 stores. A buyout of Saga by Marriott Corporation led to a sell off of the Grandy's chain, along with other concepts owned by Saga, to American Restaurant Group. In the late 1990s, Grandy's, now over 20 years old, began to close older locations and remote markets that were underperforming. They retreated to the core markets of Texas and Oklahoma with a strong presence in southern Indiana and northern Kentucky.

The Asia Pacific operations of Grandy's was operated by MBf American Foods Ltd, incorporated in Hong Kong, in turn owned by MBf Holdings Berhad of Malaysia. Its offices were in Kuala Lumpur with a training center located in Petaling Jaya. Grandy's first Malaysian outlet was at Subang Parade, opened in December 1988. MBf American Foods planned to have 50 outlets in Malaysia opened by late 1989 and open an outlet in Jakarta, Indonesia and Singapore in April 1989.

In 2000, American Restaurant Group sold Grandy's and three other subsidiaries to Spectrum Restaurant Group.

Spectrum filed for bankruptcy twice, in 2003 and 2006 respectively. In 2006, Spectrum put Grandy's up for sale. Souper Salad acquired Grandy's in 2007. Souper Salad filed for bankruptcy in 2011.

On December 19, 2011, Grandy's was acquired by Captain D's for an undisclosed amount.

As of May 2019, Grandy's had 38 restaurants, almost half being in the Dallas–Fort Worth metroplex. In December 2020, the original location in Lewisville, Texas closed, leaving a total of 27 restaurants. By October 2021, that number had fallen to 24, franchised across six states. As of April 2026, the company operates 15 locations in Georgia, Oklahoma, and Texas. A location opened in Murfreesboro, Tennessee in 2020 but closed 6 months later.

== See also ==
- List of chicken restaurants
