= Baum Site =

Archaeological site of in Currituck County, North Carolina

- U.S. National Register of Historic Places
- Nearest city: Aydlett, NC Poplar Branch, North Carolina
- Area: 5 acres (2.0 ha)
- NRHP reference No.: 80002818
- Added to NRHP: December 8, 1980

The Baum Site (31Ck9) is one of the most prominent Middle and Late Woodland Period sites of the Colington Phase in the state of North Carolina. It is located north of Poplar Branch in Currituck County, North Carolina. This phase, marked by cultures of the Algonkian peoples, aligns with the Late Woodland period in North Carolina, occurring during English explorations between 1584 and 1587, and permanent settlement at 1650. This village is what the first English explorers encountered when entering the coastal region. The site contained ossuaries and evidence for a coastal village adaptation. The site was registered with the National Register of Historic Places on December 8, 1982, after testing and excavations in 1972 and 1973 by David Sutton Phelps, who was an archaeologist at East Carolina University. The site is suffering from erosion due to wave action. After the initial discovery, which was the result of erosion uncovering of remains, Phelps claimed, “this will provide the first glimpse of a coastal village of this type in the state”. A residential subdivision, Currituck Crossing, is now located on the Baum site.

== Geography ==
The site is 5 acres of Norfolk loamy fine sand, found north of Poplar Branch, a small town in North Carolina. Currituck Sound, a canal, and a farm pond surround it. The Baum site has a rolling topography with two ridges, one running parallel to the coast.

== Excavations ==
After a survey in the mid-1950s of Currituck County, East Carolina University conducted a study of the area known as the Baum Site after reports of exposed bone along the beach. During this early excavation, the focus was mainly on developing a basic stratigraphy and context. Milford Baum, whom the site is named after, allowed Phelps and colleagues to conduct research on the area since the already found remains showed significant evidence of Algonkian and Woodland occupation. An ossuary was found, known as Burial 1, which had the remains of 58 individuals, several of which were articulated. Although there was another burial found first, Feature 1, it only contained traces of a pit, which did not warrant an excavation. Many of the remains were well preserved due to the presence of oyster shells, which acted as acid-neutralizing agents in the soil. The excellent preservation allowed Phelps and his team to make numerous interpretations regarding dating, culture, and modes of subsistence.

In 1980, another survey was conducted when another burial was found, due to erosion. This burial, known as Burial 5 ossuary, contained around 30 individuals, with one of the individuals being in an upper pit. These findings confirm a presence of Native Americans during the Colington Phase.

The site had been regarded as a very important shell midden site in the state of North Carolina for decades. It has been used for research and investigation several times, including in 2005, when archaeologists from the Office of State Archaeology found remains that were uncovered by erosion at the bluff area of the site.

Coastal Carolina Research, Inc. conducted another investigation in 2006 “…in response to a planned development. Limited testing concluded…the development was the fringe of the village. The area was subsequently mitigated through data recovery”.

== Artifacts and Interpretations ==
The ossuaries present at the shell midden site provide important information about Woodland period material culture. Permanent village life is thought to have originated during the Colington Phase locally.

According to the North Carolina Office of State Archaeology, many ceramics, blades, shellfish remains, and other projectile points were recovered from the site. Copper beads and a marginella shell necklace were also found to be linked with the ossuaries. It can be interpreted that the Algonkian Indians who inhabited the Baum site relied heavily on oysters and other marine resources for survival. In Burial 5, the only intentionally deposited artifact was a marginella shell necklace and a disc-shaped copper bead.

During this time period, agriculture was an important source for survival. In the village, corn was a staple, as well as the cultivation of beans and squash. John Noakes and Betty Lee Brandau were able to use radiocarbon dating in order to provide a time of existence of the Woodland Indians. They found that, “Charred juncus grass fragments of woven grass mat upon which lay a cremated burial…[which] partly intruded into an ossuary…Both date from the late Algonkian occupation of the site”. The dating for these artifacts was A.D. 1590 with an error of +/- 65 years. According to the same article, oysters and ceramics from the Baum site were also dated at A.D. 635 with an error of +/- 70 years, a much different date than the burial and grass mat. Based on the cultural pattern, resembling the Algonkian culture, the 3 burials found seem to suggest the first evidence of ‘cemetery areas’. Methods such as these are key for archaeologists and scholars who are attempting to better understand the history of a site.

== Problems ==
Erosion from sea level rising and storms was and continues to be a continual, destructive process on coastal sites, such as Baum. Archaeologists also face difficult issues with time and funding. For example, Burial 1 was discovered in 1973 but was not excavated until 1974, when sufficient resources were available to proceed.
