= Jarvisburg, North Carolina =

- Unincorporated community
- Interactive map of Jarvisburg, North Carolina
- Coordinates: 36°12′10.58″N 75°51′59.69″W
- Country: United States
- State: North Carolina
- County: Currituck
- ZIP code: 27947
- GNIS feature ID: 987532

Jarvisburg is an unincorporated community in rural Currituck County, North Carolina. A post office was established around 1890.

There is a post office, elementary school, cafe, Jarvisburg Church of Christ, and Sanctuary Vineyard winery.

A two room schoolhouse for "colored" students in the district was enlarged and remodeled in 1911, adding a second-story and central bell tower, the Jarvisburg Colored School is now a museum and listed on the National Register of Historic Places.

Corinth Baptist Church is also located in the area.

A 1929 building, once a working cotton gin, was destroyed by fire in 2019. At that time the building contained a well-known gift shop called "The Cotton Gin".

In 2022 a resident of Jarvisburg won $2 million on a scratch-off game administered by the North Carolina Education Lottery.
