= Twin Houses =

Historic houses in North Carolina, United States

- U.S. National Register of Historic Places
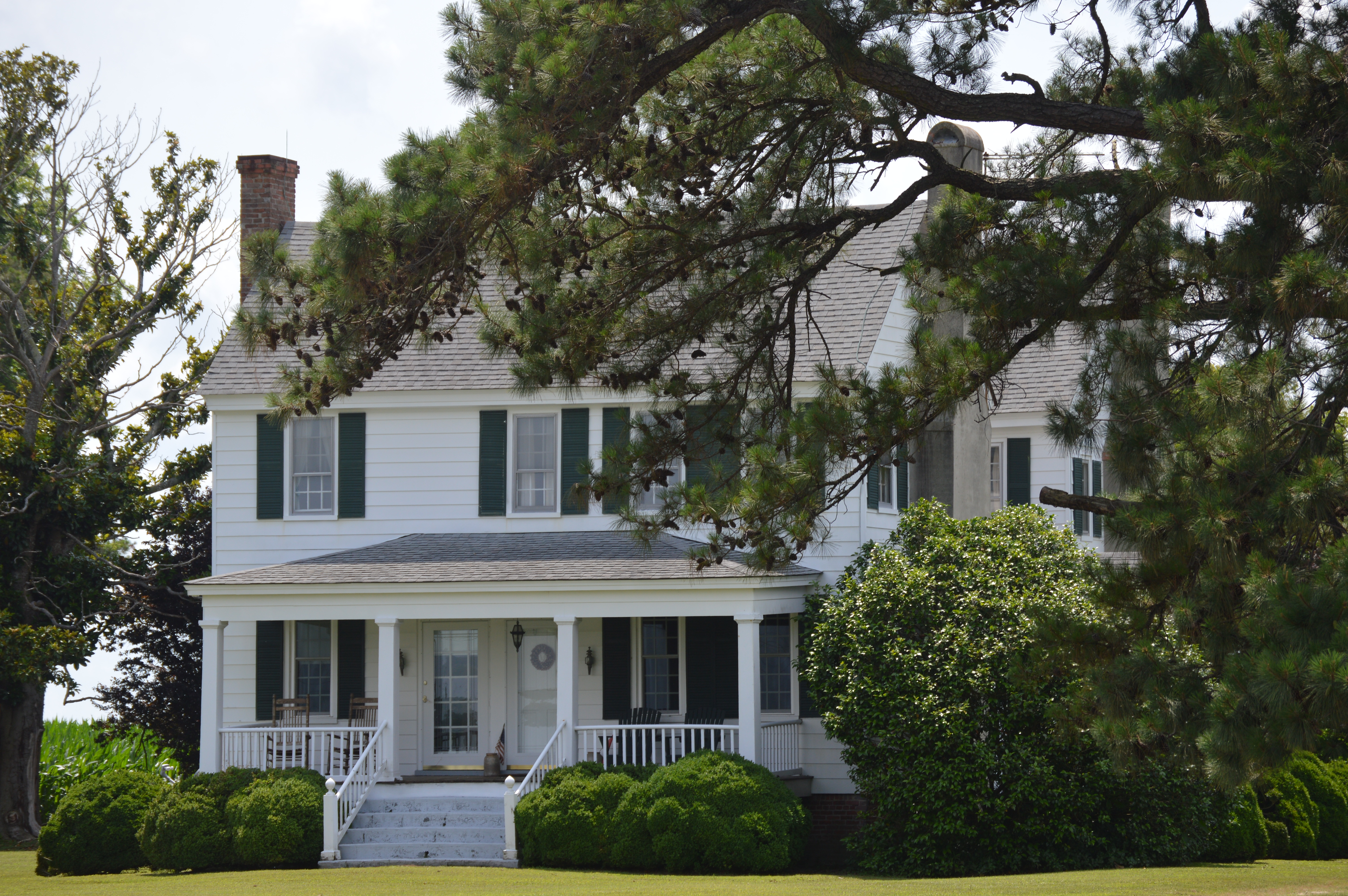
- Front

- Location within North Carolina Location within the United States
- Location: On NC 168 at jct. of SR 1203 and 1147, Shawboro, North Carolina
- Coordinates: 36°24′33″N 76°5′52″W
- Area: 2 acres (0.81 ha)
- Built: c. 1797
- Architectural style: Federal
- NRHP reference No.: 72000959
- Added to NRHP: April 13, 1972

Twin Houses is a historic home located at Shawboro, Currituck County, North Carolina. It was built about 1797, and consists of two separate two-story, five bay by two bay, identical Federal style structures, joined by a transverse hall. Each house has a hall-and-parlor plan, exterior end chimneys, and they are connected by a one-story, gable roofed, connecting hall.

It was listed on the National Register of Historic Places in 1972.

Col. Henry Shaw and his wife are buried at the property, which is currently owned by local historian E. Ray Ethrridge.
