= Jarvisburg Colored School =

Historic school building in North Carolina, United States

- U.S. National Register of Historic Places
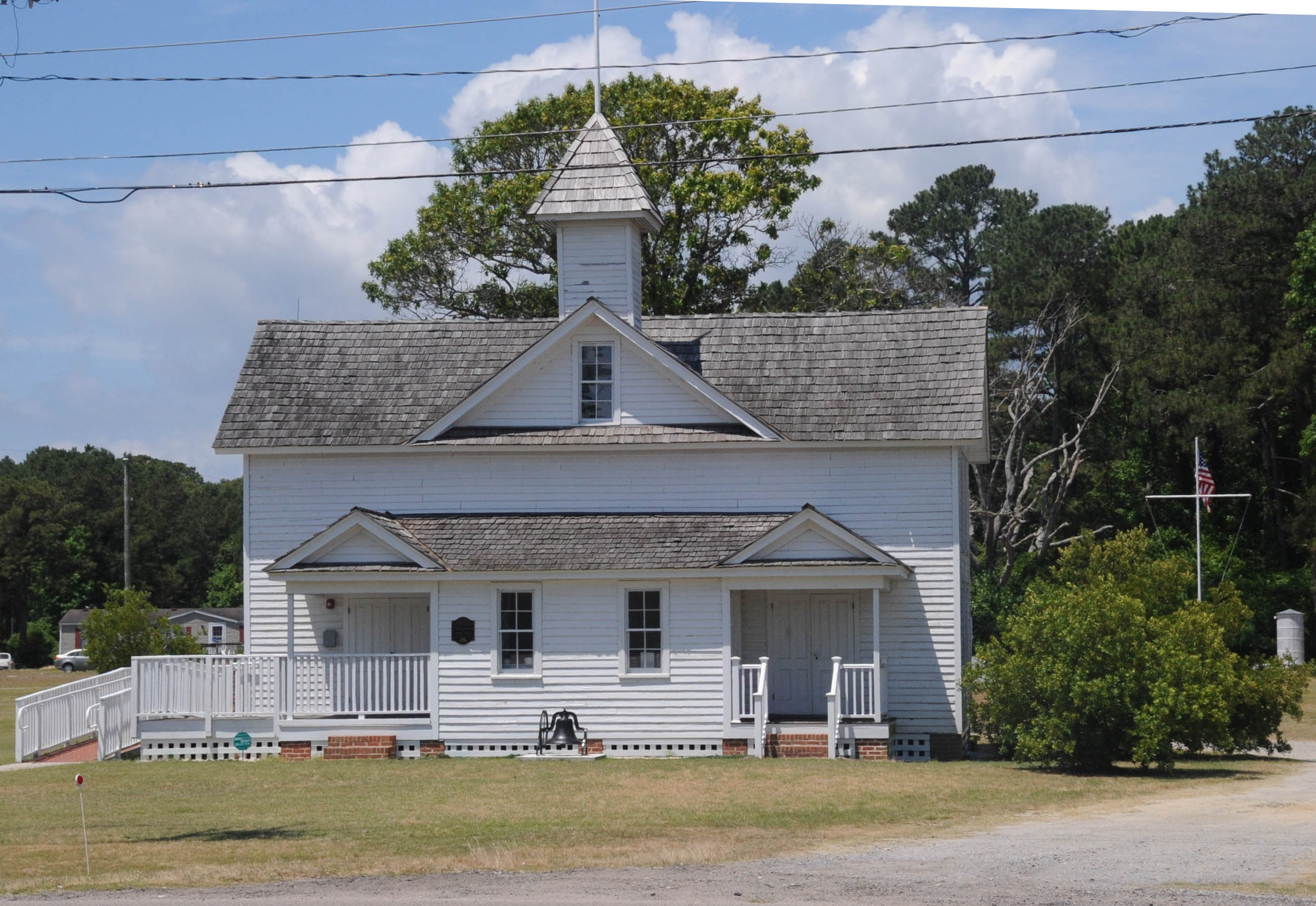
- School building in 2019

- Location within North Carolina Location within the United States
- Location: 7301 NC 158, Jarvisburg, North Carolina
- Coordinates: 36°11′11″N 75°51′54″W
- Area: less than one acre
- Built: 1911
- Built by: Barrett and Thomson; Ferebee, James Brown
- Architectural style: Queen Anne
- NRHP reference No.: 09001104
- Added to NRHP: December 11, 2009

Jarvisburg Colored School is a historic school building for African-American students located at Jarvisburg, Currituck County, North Carolina. First built as a one-room school in 1868 on land donated by Mr. William Hunt Sr, an educated African American farmer in Currituck, His gift of land included property for a church. Replaced in the 1890s with a two-room building and again expanded in 1911 to its current size. It was in service from 1868 until 1950 when Currituck opened a Consolidated School and closed all the small African American county schools. The Jarvisburg Colored School is a two-story, frame building built of cypress wood with Queen Anne style design elements. It has a gable roof and features a pyramidal roofed bell tower with the original four foot wooden spire. It last housed a school in 1950. Today, the Jarvisburg Colored School serves as a Museum to share the stories of former students and histories of all the Colored Schools in Currituck County, North Carolina.

It was listed on the National Register of Historic Places in 2009.
