= Currituck Shooting Club =

- U.S. National Register of Historic Places
- Location within North Carolina Location within the United States
- Location: South of Corolla, near Corolla, North Carolina
- Coordinates: 36°17′08″N 75°48′13″W
- Area: 2,018 acres (817 ha)
- Built: 1879-1882
- NRHP reference No.: 80002816
- Added to NRHP: May 28, 1980

Currituck Shooting Club was a historic shooting club located near Corolla, Currituck County, North Carolina. The clubhouse was built between 1879 and 1882, and consisted of three connected sections. The main portion of the clubhouse was a 2 1/2-story frame building sheathed in cedar shake shingles. Also on the property were a boatmen's house, and boathouse complex, and scattered outbuildings. The Currituck Shooting Club was formed in 1857, and was the oldest active shooting club in the United States. The complex burned to the ground on March 20, 2003.

It was listed on the National Register of Historic Places in 1980.
