= Grandy (surname) =

Grandy is a surname. Notable people with the surname include:

- Cam Grandy (born 2000), American football player
- Charlie Grandy (born 1974), American stand-up comedian, television writer and producer
- Fred Grandy (born 1948), American actor and politician
- Jasminius Wilsonni Rudolphus Grandy III (1919–2001), American landscape architect and educator
- John Grandy (1913–2004), Royal Air Force officer
- Moses Grandy (c. 1786 – ?), American writer and abolitionist
