= Coinjock Colored School =

Historic Rosenwald school of Currituck County, North Carolina, built in 1920

- U.S. National Register of Historic Places
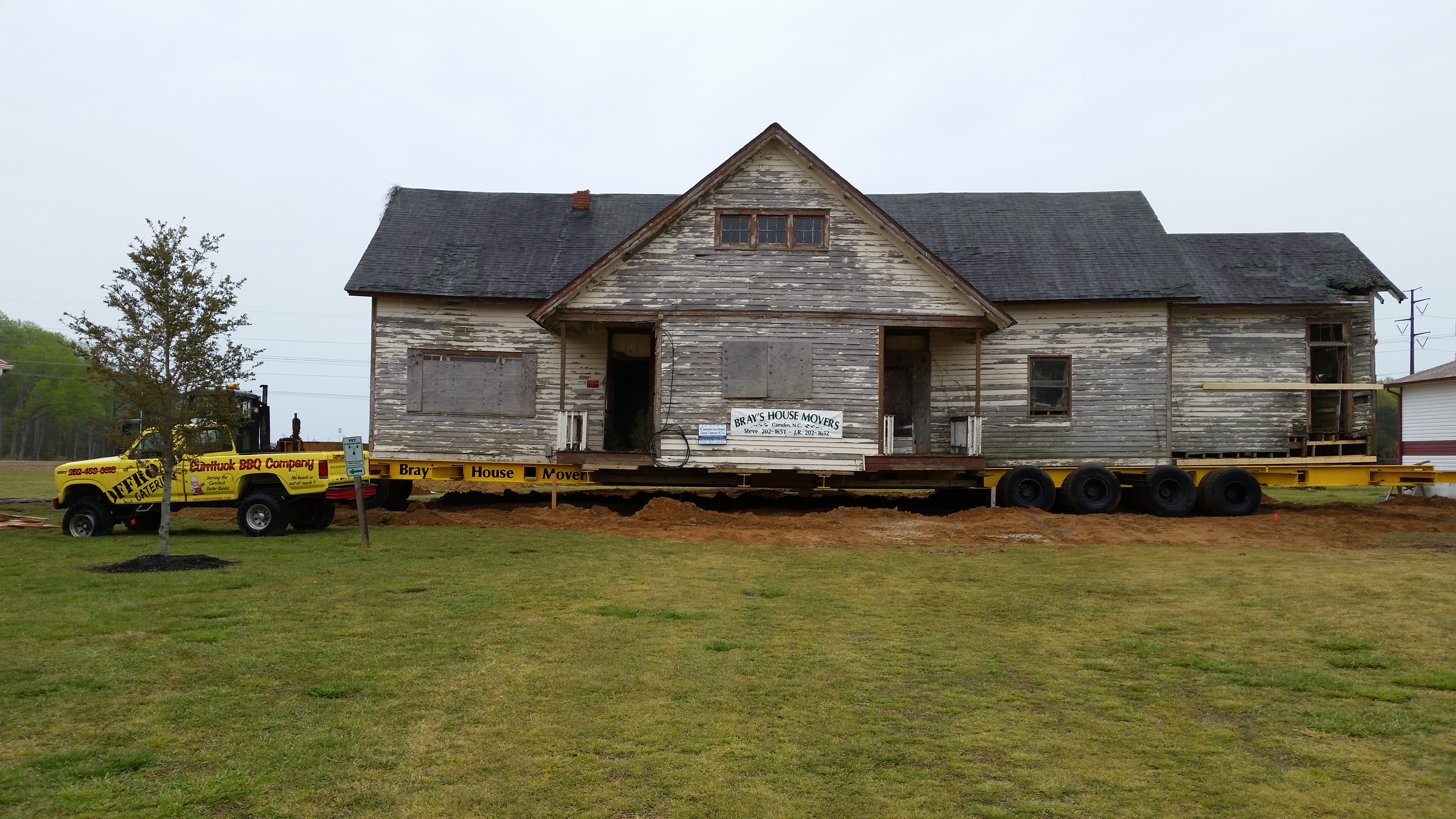

- Location within North Carolina Location within the United States
- Location: 4358 Caratoke Hwy. Coinjock, North Carolina
- Coordinates: 36°21′46″N 75°58′00″W
- Area: 0.25 acres (0.10 ha)
- Built: 1920
- Built by: Simmons, Foreman
- Architectural style: Craftsman
- NRHP reference No.: 12001156
- Added to NRHP: January 9, 2013

Coinjock Colored School is a historic Rosenwald school building for African-American students located at Coinjock, Currituck County, North Carolina. It was built in 1920, and is a one-story frame, side-gable-roof, two-classroom school building with American Craftsman style design elements. The school was one of three Rosenwald schools built in Currituck County. It housed a school until 1950.

It was listed on the National Register of Historic Places in 2013.
