= Shaw House (Shawboro, North Carolina) =

Historic house in North Carolina, United States

- U.S. National Register of Historic Places
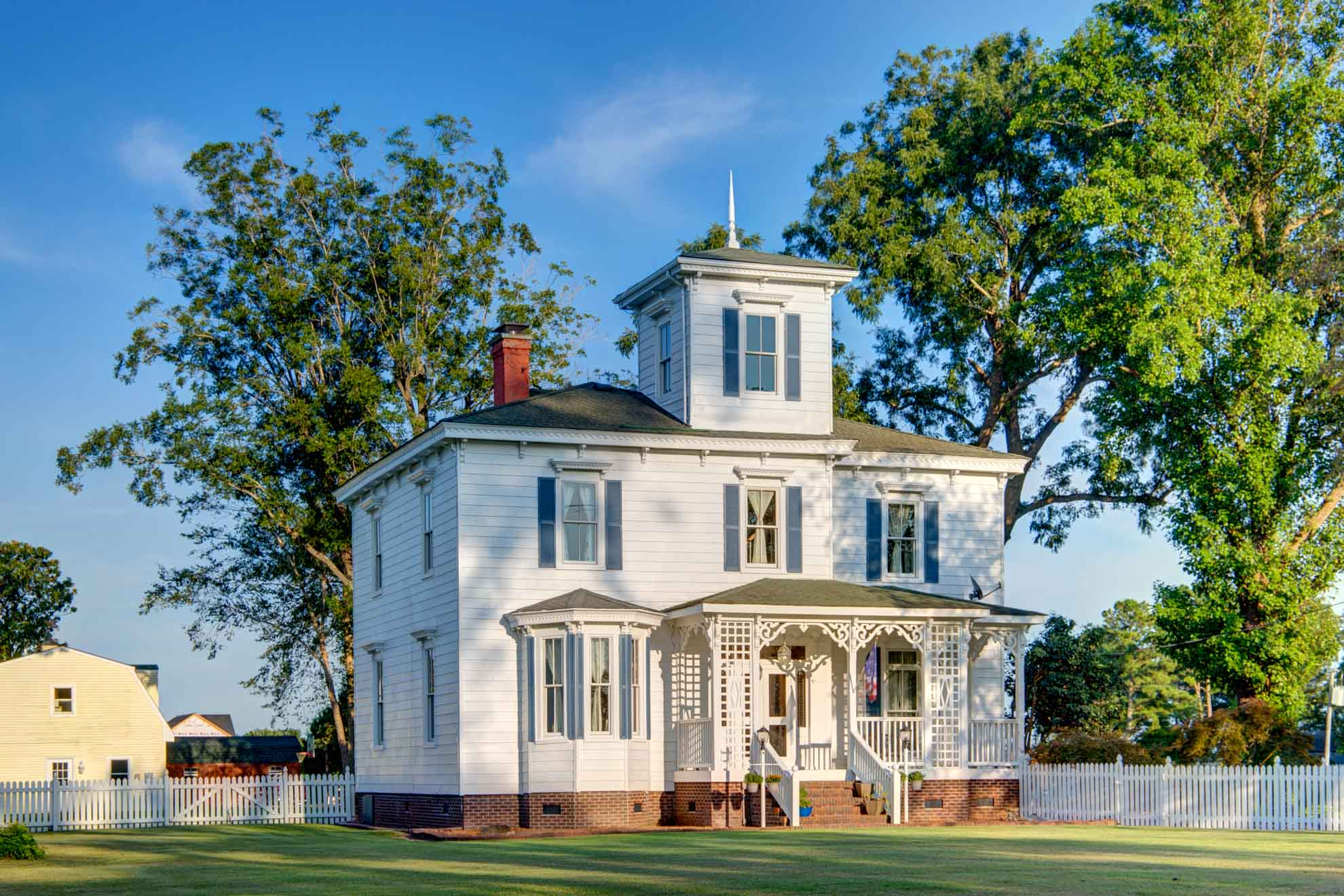
- Front

- Location within North Carolina Location within the United States
- Location: NC 34 and SR 1203; Shawboro, North Carolina
- Coordinates: 36°24′25″N 76°05′34″W
- Area: 60 acres (24 ha)
- Built: c. 1885
- Architectural style: Italianate, Vernacular Italianate
- NRHP reference No.: 80002820
- Added to NRHP: April 17, 1980

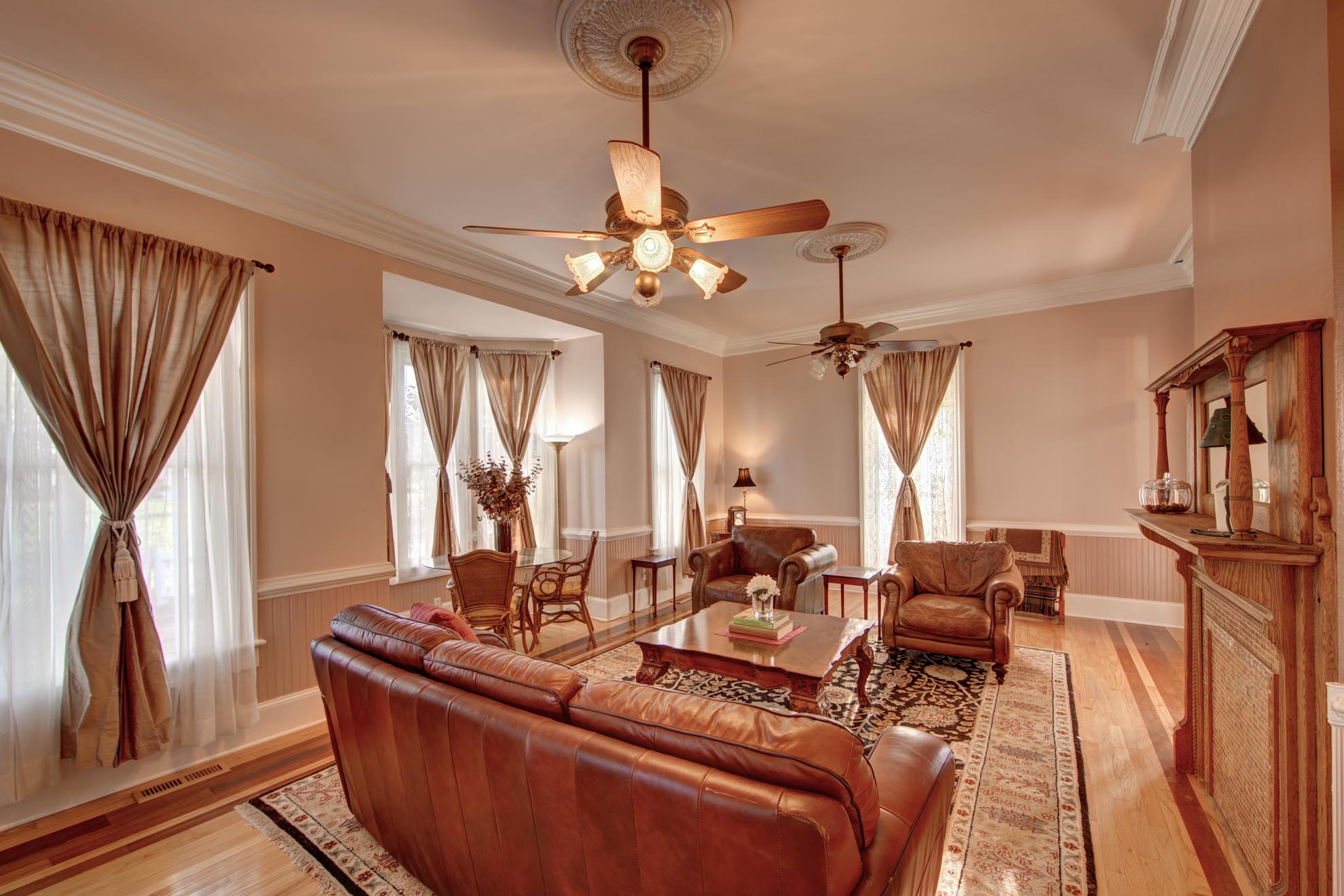
Living Room

Shaw House, also known as Cupola House, is a historic home located at Shawboro, Currituck County, North Carolina. It was built about 1885, and is a two-story, three bay by two bay, Italianate style frame dwelling on a brick foundation. It features a three-story tower and has a two-story rear wing. Also on the property are three contributing outbuildings and a well.

It was listed on the National Register of Historic Places in 1980.

== Defining Elements ==
1. modest vernacular residential form
2. asymmetrical front entrance
3. specific cladding feature
4. later renovations to the front verandah
5. square verandah columns
6. irregular fenestration
7. small window at front entry
8. fifteen-pane French front entry door
9. internal red brick chimney with corbelled cap
