= Coinjock, North Carolina =

- Census-designated place
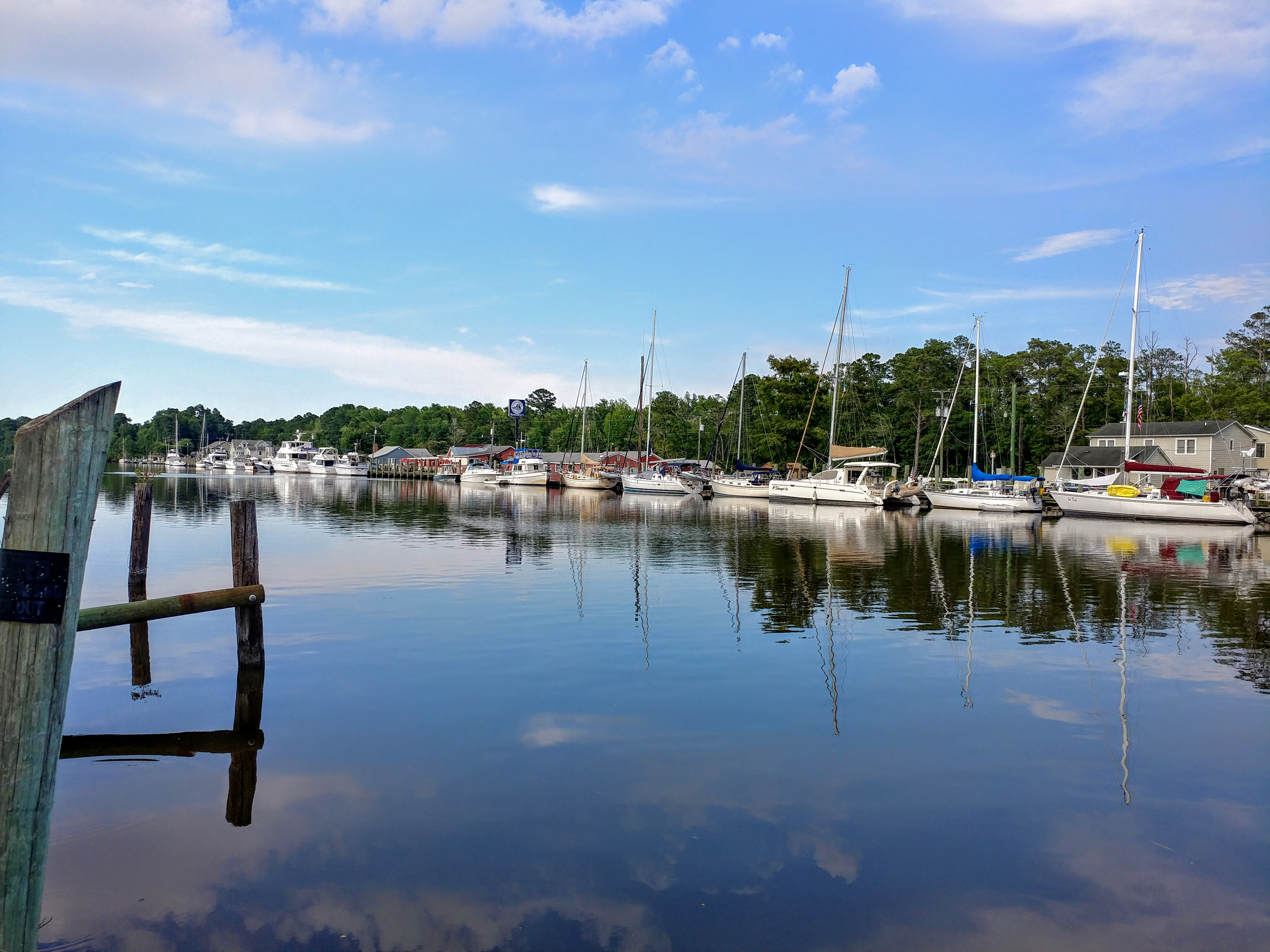

- Location within North Carolina
- Coordinates: 36°21′04″N 75°57′09″W
- Country: United States
- State: North Carolina
- County: Currituck

Area
  - Total: 0.87 sq mi (2.26 km^{2})
  - Land: 0.84 sq mi (2.17 km^{2})
  - Water: 0.031 sq mi (0.08 km^{2})
- Elevation: 3 ft (0.91 m)

Population (2020)
  - Total: 337
  - Density: 401.4/sq mi (154.97/km^{2})
- Time zone: UTC-5 (Eastern (EST))
  - Summer (DST): UTC-4 (EDT)
- ZIP Code: 27923
- Area code: 252
- GNIS feature ID: 2628619
- FIPS code: 37-13500

Coinjock is an unincorporated community and census-designated place (CDP) in Currituck County, North Carolina, United States. As of the 2020 census, Coinjock had a population of 337. It is located on U.S. Route 158 between Barco and Grandy, about 20 miles (32 km) south of the Virginia state line, and is at mile marker 50 on the southern portion of the Albemarle and Chesapeake Canal, on the Intracoastal Waterway. Church's Island to the east of Coinjock in the Currituck Sound has a village called Waterlily, which uses the postal address of Coinjock as well. The island's name is not due to a decayed church that was once a landmark of the tiny community, but because it once belonged the family & descendants of Captain Richard Church (a prominent man and member to the House of Burgesses in Jamestowne, Va.) - . Coinjock is bordered by Currituck Sound to the east; the North River lies to the west. Its ZIP Code is 27923.

The name Coinjock is of Native American origin, meaning "the place of the blueberry swamps", referring to the swamp blueberries native to the county. The name has also been spelled "Coenjock", "Cowenjock", or "Cornjack", and sometimes as two words with the second beginning with a capital J. Bishop Thomas Coke visited Coenjock, as he called it, and preached to a small congregation in its chapel on March 19, 1785.

The Coinjock Colored School was listed on the National Register of Historic Places in 2013.

== Demographics ==
Historical population
Census	Pop.	Note	%±
2020	337		—
U.S. Decennial Census
