= Culong =

Historic home in Currituck County, North Carolina, built in 1812

- U.S. National Register of Historic Places
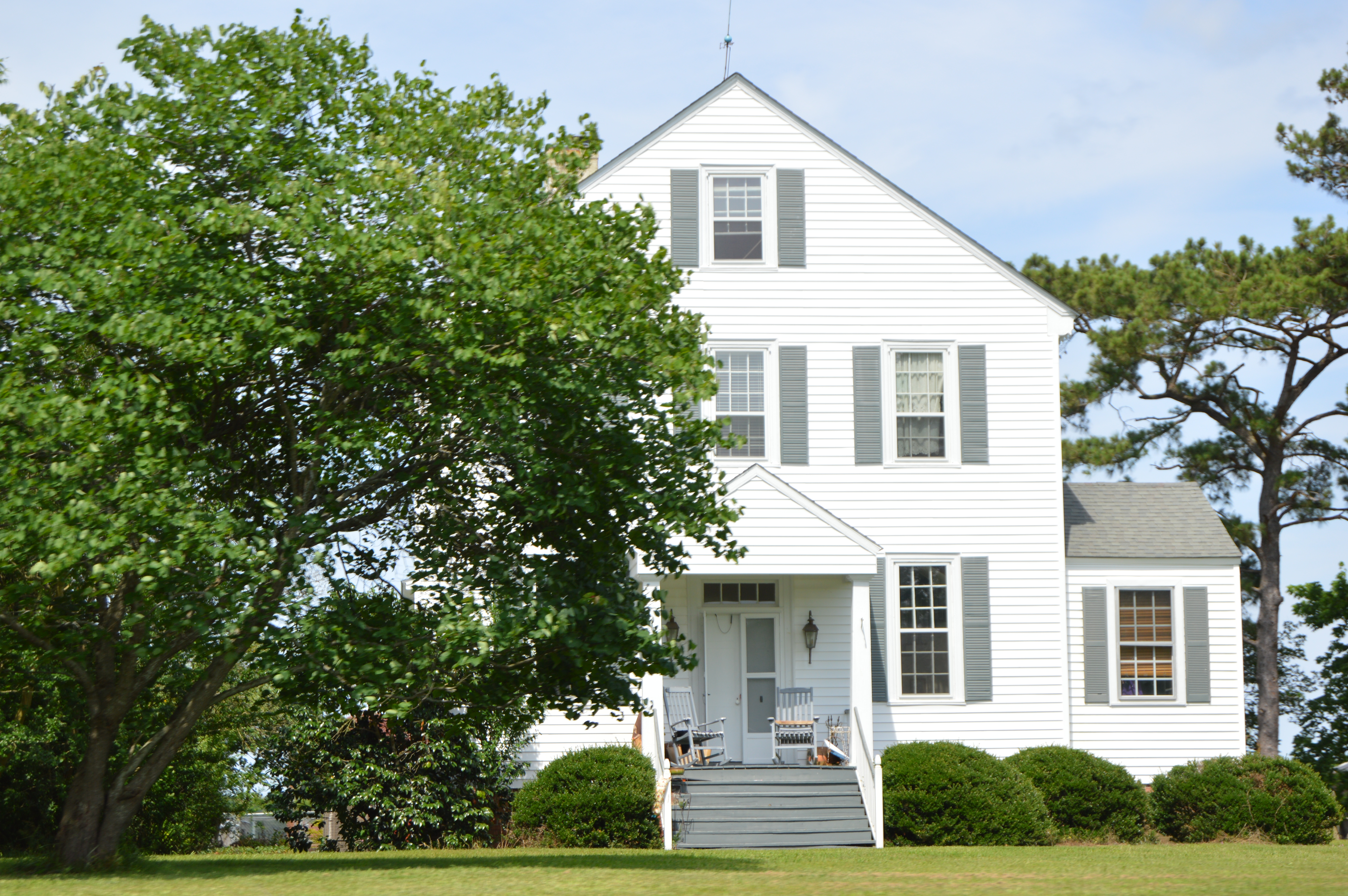
- Front

- Location within North Carolina Location within the United States
- Location: South of Shawboro on SR 1147, near Shawboro, North Carolina
- Coordinates: 36°21′58″N 76°04′29″W
- Area: 130 acres (53 ha)
- Built: 1812
- Built by: Ferebee, Thomas Cooper
- Architectural style: Federal
- NRHP reference No.: 80002819
- Added to NRHP: February 1, 1980

Culong, also known as the Thomas Cooper Ferebee House and Forbes House, is a historic home located near Shawboro, Currituck County, North Carolina. It was built in 1812, and is a two-story, three bay by three bay, Federal style frame dwelling with a gable roof. It has two wing additions and a one-story front portico. Also on the property are two contributing outbuildings and family cemetery.

It was listed on the National Register of Historic Places in 1980.
