= Currituck Beach Light =

Lighthouse in North Carolina, US

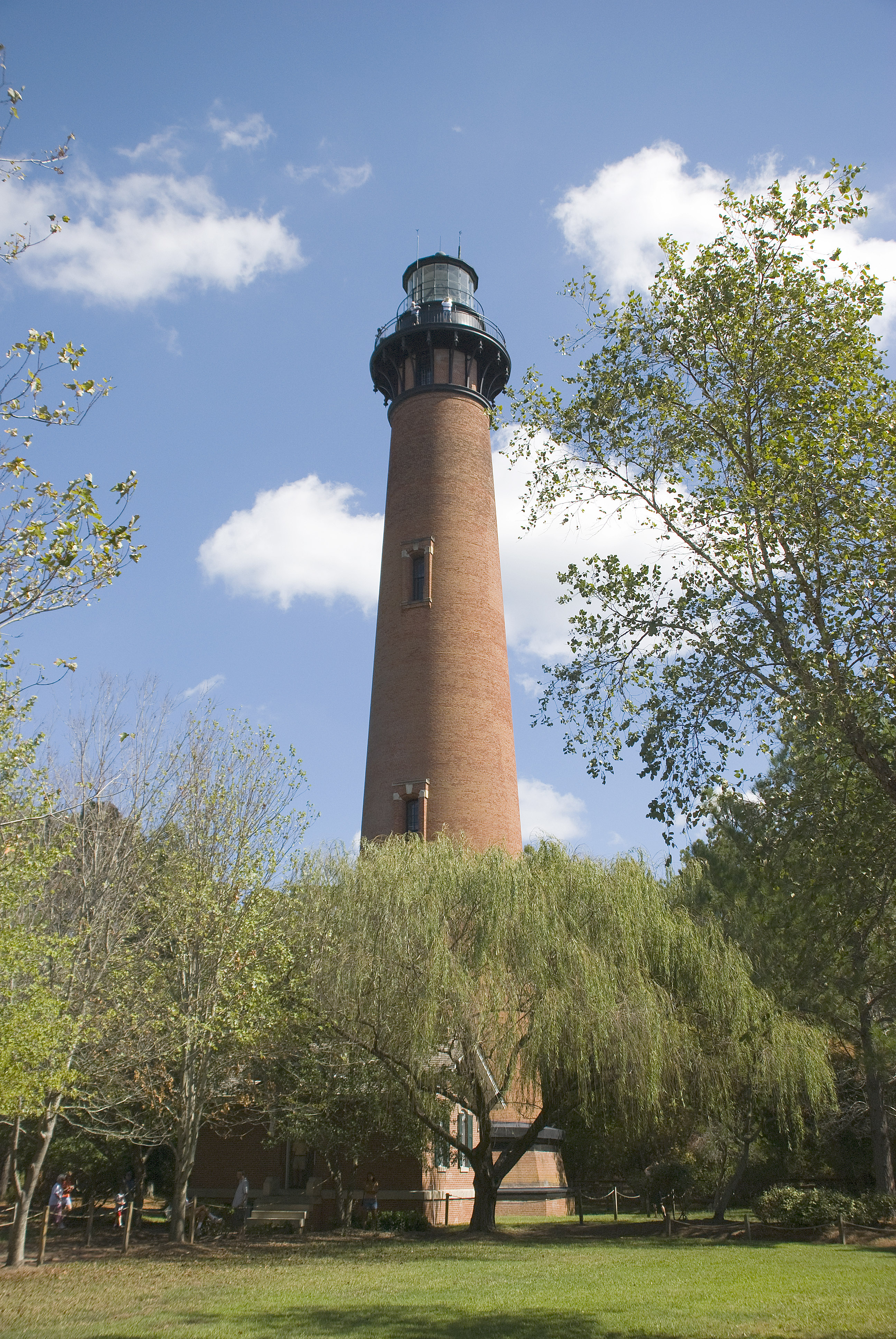
- Currituck Beach Lighthouse
- Location: Corolla, North Carolina
- Coordinates: 36.376667°N 75.830833°W

Tower
- Constructed: 1875
- Construction: Brick
- Automated: 1939
- Height: 162 ft (49 m)
- Shape: Conical tower
- Heritage: National Register of Historic Places listed place

Light
- First lit: 1875
- Focal height: 158 feet (48 m)
- Lens: First-order Fresnel lens
- Range: 18 nmi (33 km; 21 mi)
- Characteristic: 20-second flash cycle (on for 3 seconds, off for 17 seconds)
- Currituck Beach Lighthouse / Currituck Beach Lighthouse Complex
- U.S. National Register of Historic Places
- U.S. Historic district
- Area: 30.6 acres (12.4 ha)
- NRHP reference No.: 73001333 (original); 99000911 (increase)

Significant dates
- Added to NRHP: October 15, 1973
- Designated HD: January 12, 2000

The Currituck Beach Light (/ˈkʊrɪtʌk/) is a lighthouse located on the Outer Banks in Corolla, North Carolina. The Currituck Beach Light was added to the National Register of Historic Places on October 15, 1973.

== History ==
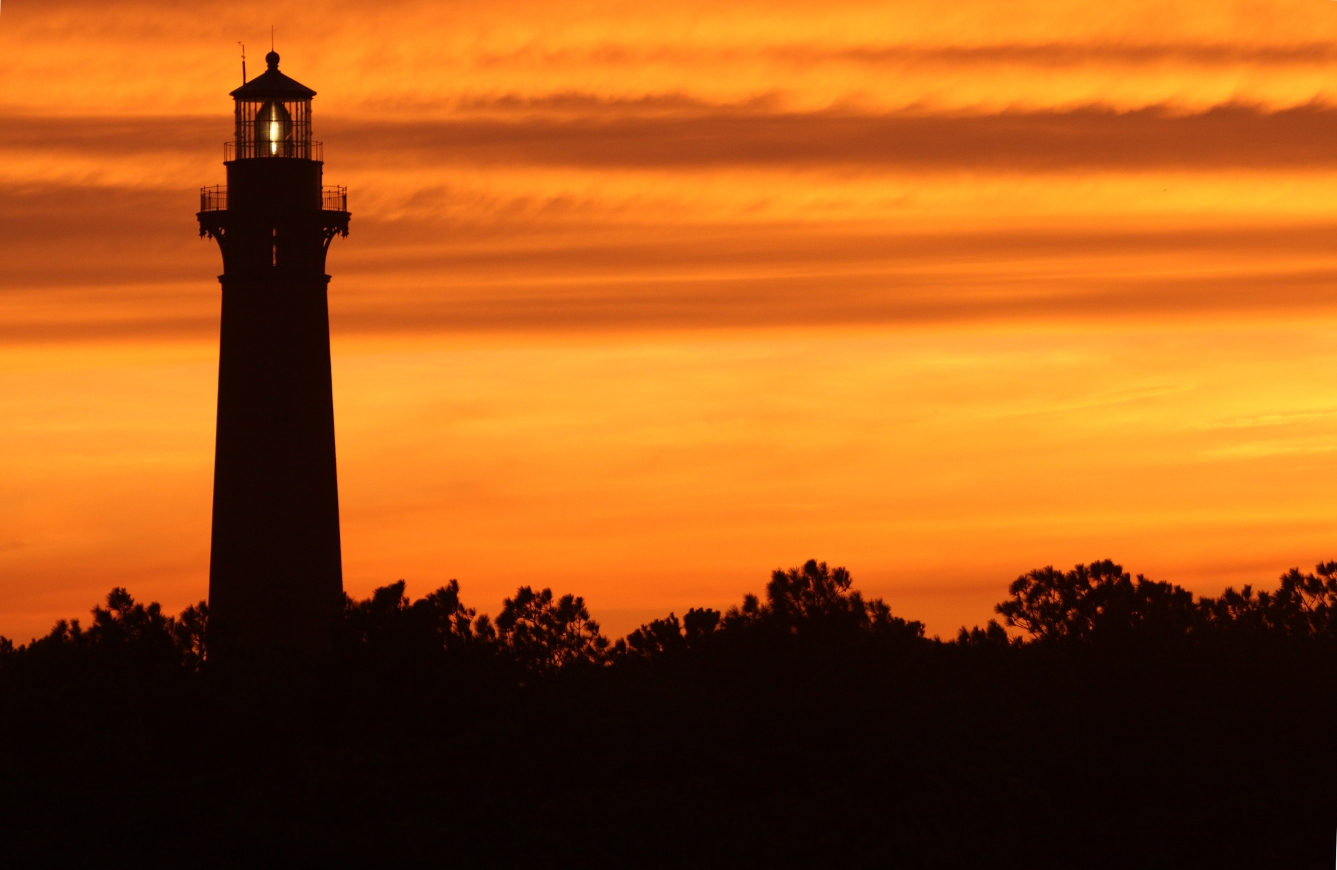
The sunset behind the lighthouse looking up from the beach.

On December 1, 1875, the Currituck Beach Light was completed, located between Cape Henry Light and Bodie Island. Unlike its fellows, Currituck Beach Light was not painted, leaving its brick facade visible. In 1939, the lighthouse was automated following a merger of the United States Coast Guard with the Bureau of Lighthouses.

The Outer Banks Conservationists (OBC) performed much of the reconstruction and refurbishing work since 1980 through private funding and volunteer work. Since 1991 visitors have been allowed to climb the original 220 steps to the outdoor gallery. Access to the lens room is not permitted as the first order lens is not only the original lens, but it is still a functioning one. The light comes on every night and shines from 158 feet (48 m) at 20-second intervals to warn ships hugging the chain of barrier islands along the coast.

In 2003, the Federal Government granted OBC the title to the lighthouse itself. The Coast Guard approved OBC's ownership proposal over that of an application submitted by Currituck County (the county in which the lighthouse is located). Through state and federal legislative maneuvering, the county sued OBC to try to acquire the property. The case was finally settled in 2006. OBC remains the owner of the Currituck Beach Lighthouse.

== Facts ==
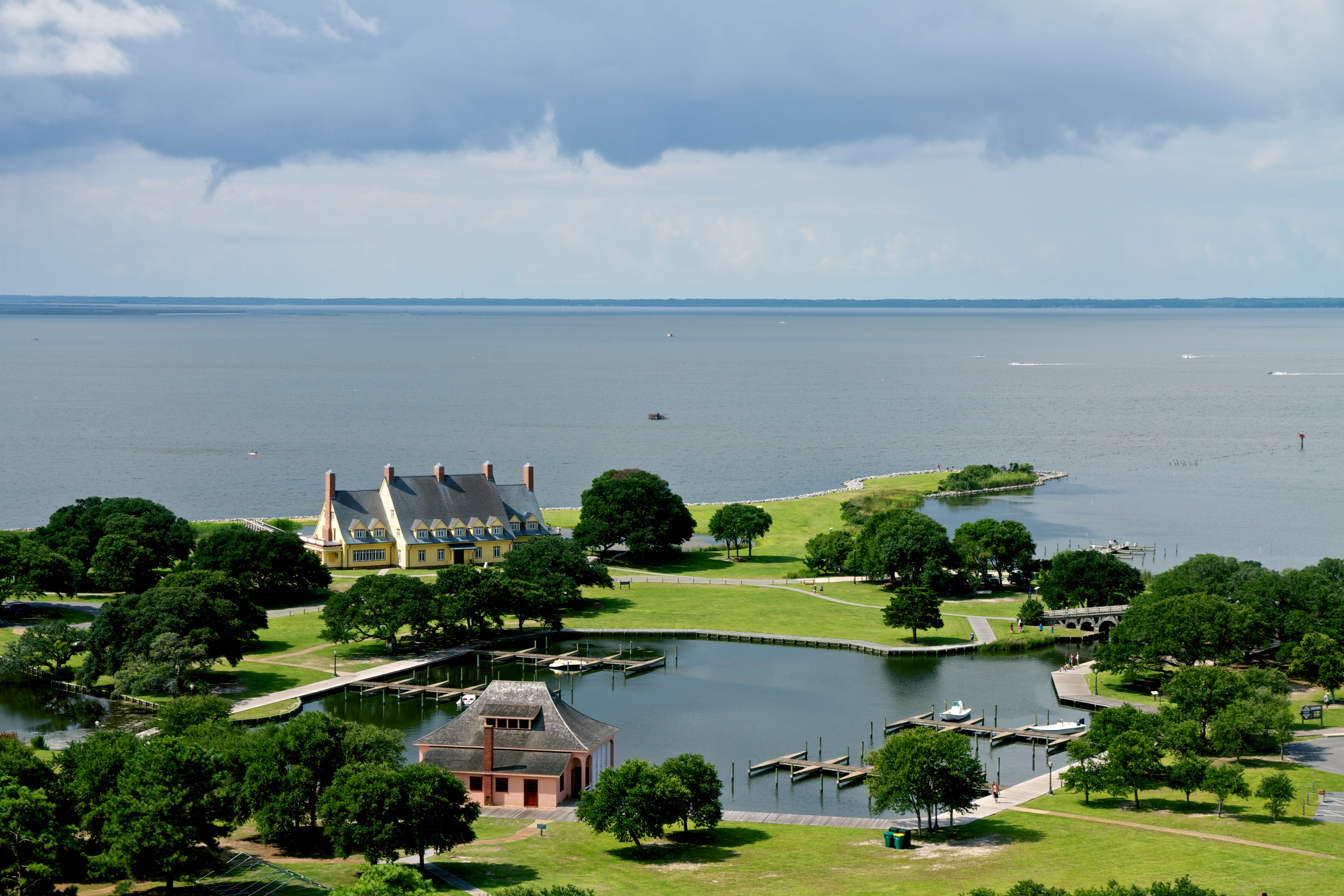
View from the top of the lighthouse

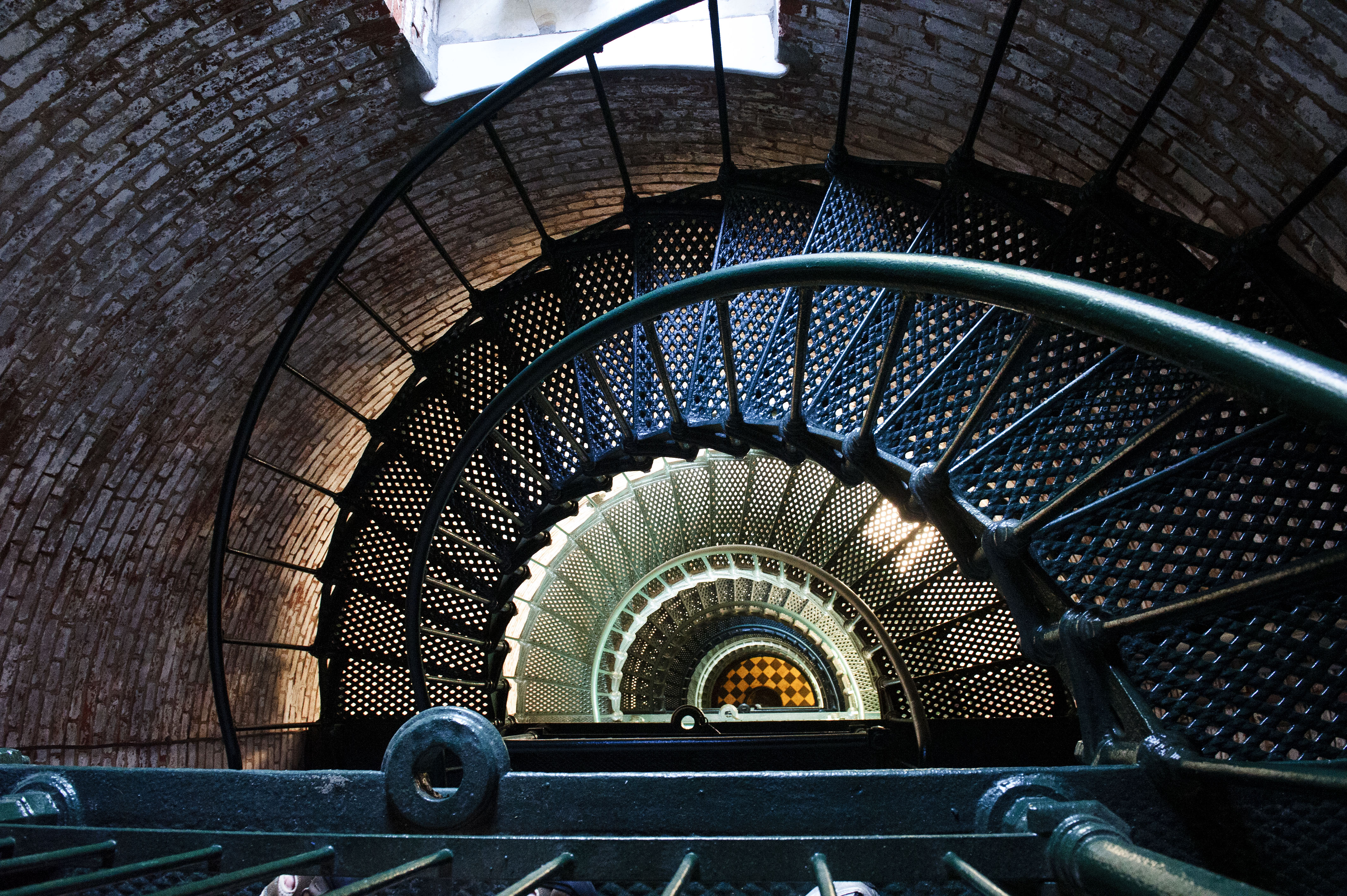
Looking down the steps from the top of the tower

- Number of steps: 220
- Height to focal plane of lens: 158 feet (48 m)
- Height to top of roof: 162 feet (49 m)
- Number of bricks: one million
- Thickness of wall at base: 5 feet 8 inches (1.73 m)
- Thickness of wall at parapet: 3 feet (0.91 m)
- Position: 34 miles (55 km) south of the Cape Henry (Virginia) Lighthouse; 32 1/2 miles (52.3 km) north-northwest of Bodie Island Lighthouse
- Coast Survey Chart: 36° 22'36" N latitude, 75° 49'51" W longitude.

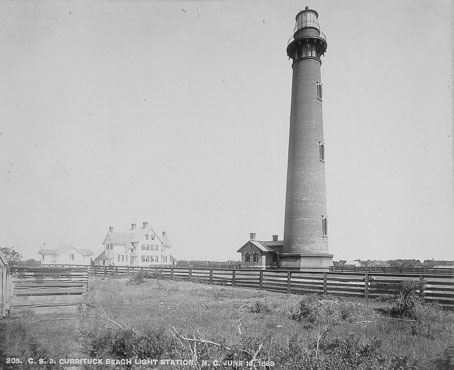
Currituck Beach Light, ca. 1883

As it had reported in previous years, the U.S. Light-House Board in 1872 stated that ships, cargoes, and lives continued to be lost along the 40 miles (64 km) of dark coastline that lay beyond the reaches of existing lighthouses. Southbound ships sailing closer to shore to avoid the Gulf Stream were especially in danger. In response, construction began on the Currituck Beach Lighthouse in 1873 with completion two years later. The date at the top of the entrance to the lighthouse says "1873" because on every lighthouse, the date on the structure is the date that construction began.

The Currituck Beach Lighthouse is a first order lighthouse, meaning it has the largest of seven Fresnel lens sizes. The original source of light was a Funck's hydraulic float lamp, fueled with lard oil, and consisting of four concentric wicks. In approximately 1884, the lighthouse converted to a mineral oil (kerosene) lamp with five concentric wicks; the largest was 4 inches in diameter. By 1913, an incandescent oil vapor lamp was used, with kerosene vaporized and forced into the burner by use of a hand pump attached to the storage tank.

Before the advent of electricity, a mechanical means was required to rotate the huge lenses that made the light appear to flash. A system of weights suspended from a line powered a clockwork mechanism beneath the lantern—much like the workings of a grandfather clock. The keeper cranked the weights up by hand every two and a half hours.

In approximately 1939, the lighthouse was completely automated. The Coast Guard took over the duties and responsibilities of the United States Lighthouse Board, and the lighthouse had computerized devices installed which turned the light on automatically. Four 1000 watt bulbs were installed in the light room, however only one flashed at night (the other three served as back-up emergency replacements, which would automatically start if one bulb went out.) Because the lighthouse was automated, the keepers were no longer needed to tend to the lighthouse, and all lighthouse keepers on the compound were dismissed from their duties.

Like the other lighthouses on North Carolina's Outer Banks, this one still serves as an aid to navigation. The beacon comes on automatically every evening at dusk and ceases at dawn.

With a 20-second flash cycle (on for 3 seconds, off for 17 seconds), the light can be seen for 18 nautical miles (33 km). The distinctive sequence enables the lighthouse not only to warn mariners but also to help identify their locations. The original four-bulb light system has been replaced with only two light bulbs, as the lights now last longer than they did in 1939. (The lights remain 1000 watts, and the Coast Guard replaces them.) (The lights last about a year per bulb.)

The Currituck Beach Lighthouse was the last major brick lighthouse built on the Outer Banks.

Sand Island Light (Alabama) was built in 1873 using the same plans as Currituck Beach Light, but with a second order Fresnel lens.

== Timeline ==
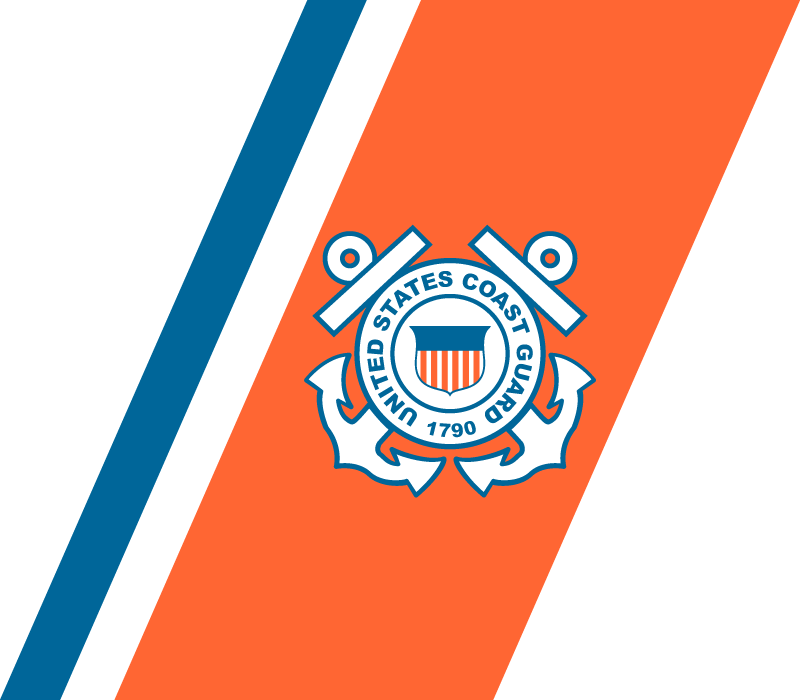

Historic Light Station Information – NORTH CAROLINA

CURRITUCK BEACH LIGHT:

- 1875: 1 December: Beacon was first lit.
- 1876: The Victorian "stick style" keeper's house was completed.
- 1920: An 1870s dwelling was moved from the Long Point Lighthouse Station to the site as a smaller keeper's residence.
- 1939: Light was automated under USCG control.
- 2001: The Coast Guard determined the Currituck Beach Lighthouse to be excess. Currituck Light was among the first lighthouses to be excessed after the passage of National Historic Lighthouse Preservation Act (NHLPA).
- The Historical Services Administration deeded the keeper's house and the land around the house to the state of North Carolina. The lighthouse remained the property of the federal government. Keeper's house was empty, decaying and open to the elements for further deterioration and vandalism.
- On 17 October 2003 the deed to the lighthouse was transferred to the Outer Banks Conservationists, Inc., through the auspices of the NHLPA.

— United States Coast Guard

== Currituck Beach Lighthouse Compound ==
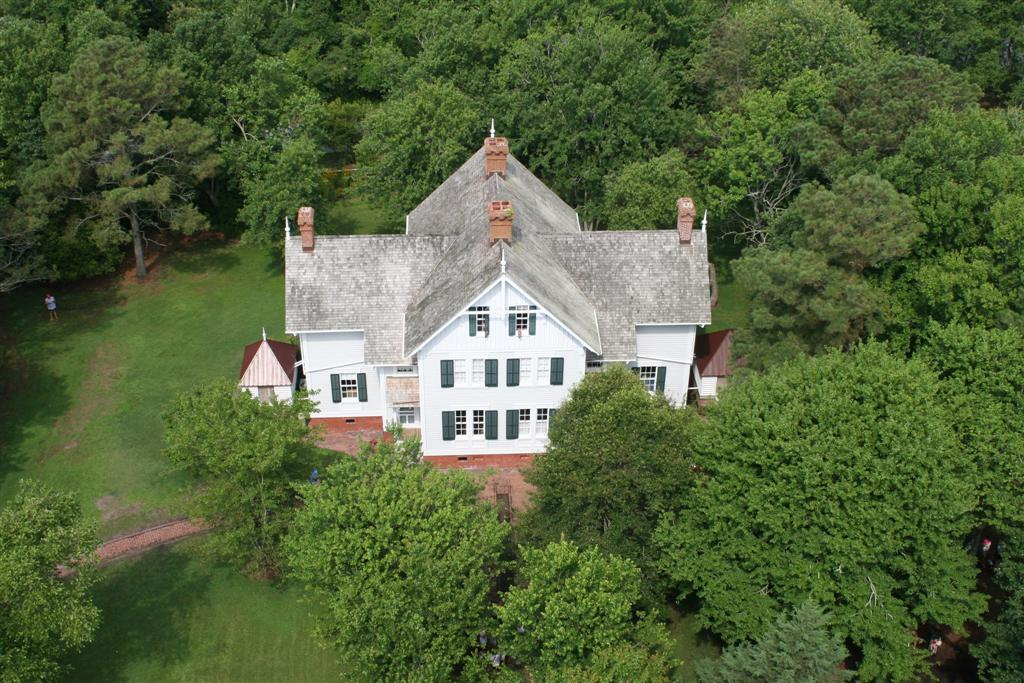
View of the Keeper's house on the compound from the top of the lighthouse.

The Outer Banks Conservationists work to restore and maintain the lighthouse and buildings on the compound. Visitors can climb the lighthouse daily from Easter through Thanksgiving. A small house, possibly a residence for a third keeper and his family, has been restored for use as a museum shop. The exterior of the larger Keeper's House has been restored, but work continues on the interior. Other structures on the compound include a two-hole privy, two cisterns that store rain water, and a storage building used as an office.

== Currituck Beach Lighthouse lightkeepers and their families ==
- Captain Nathan Swain and Francis Slice Swain (1905–1920)
- Loren Edward Tillett Sr. (1921–1930)
