= Whalehead Club =

Historic home in North Carolina

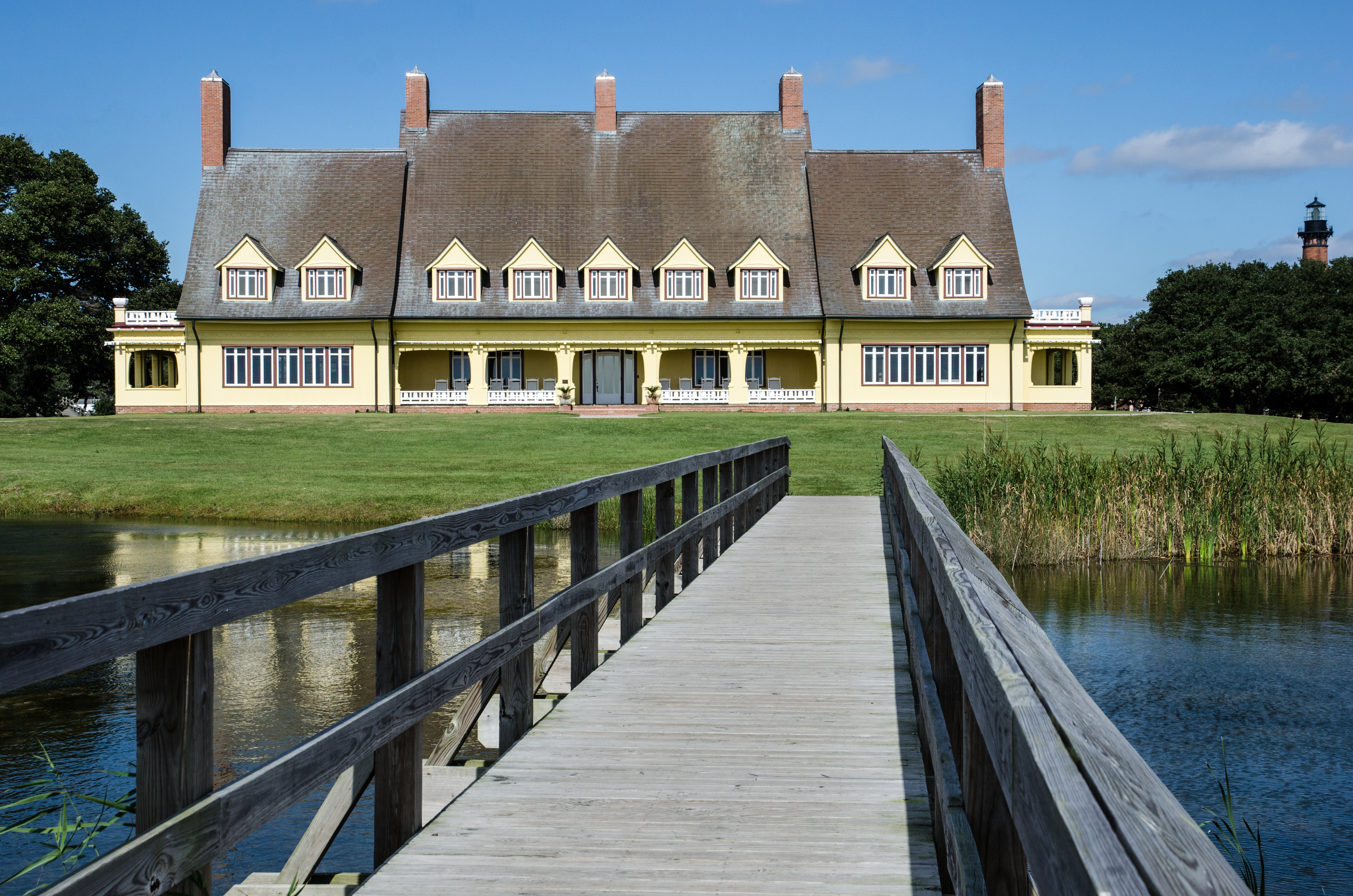
Whalehead Club

The Historic Whalehead Club is a large 21,000-square-foot (2,000 m^{2}) home located on a remote tract facing the Currituck Sound in North Carolina, United States. The structure was designed by owners Edward Collings Jr. and Marie Louise Label Knight and contracted by Daniel Peckham between 1922 and 1925. The home remains a prominent example of Art Nouveau.

== History ==
In 1920, Edward Collings Knight, Jr., heir to a fortune made in sugar, railroads, and steamships, purchased the land with longtime companion and second wife Marie-Louise LaBel Knight. The Knights named their new residence after its location outside the village of Corolla. Built in an isolated area of the Currituck Outer Banks, the house sits along the Currituck Sound connecting to the Atlantic Flyway. Renowned for teeming flocks of waterfowl, there were many other public resources within the neighboring village to Corolla Island. Currituck Beach Life Saving Station offered a vital link to the outside world through telegraph. Alongside, Corolla village provided a postal service, general store, as well as a Baptist church, and local school. The Knights constructed Corolla Island on the Property of the Lighthouse Club, a well-known shooting club purchased by Mr. Knight. Though frequented guests avidly hunted waterfowl, Corolla Island served not as a club but a comfortable retreat for a hospitable couple and their many friends. Construction of the house began in 1922 and was completed in 1925. Norfolk building contractor John Kelbaugh orchestrated the logistics of building 20 rooms, contained within three stories. A six-foot-deep dredged channel was hand dug on the western edge, thus forming of it an Island. Among the many items the Knights brought over, the more luxurious furnishings were the custom-made Tiffany lamping in a water-lily design, as well as Louis Majorelle furniture. Corolla Island housed the Knights for nine seasons. After the couple's death in 1936, the heirs, Mr. Knights two granddaughters, sold the $348,000 estate for $25,000 and married into wealth in France. The home was used for many purposes after the Knights deaths. During the WWII era the home became an active Coast Guard recruitment base. In 1959, '60 and '61, the home and adjoining acreage were used by Corolla Academy as a private boys' summer school, offering credit and remedial courses for Grades 7 through 12. After that—one source says in 1964—the property was bought by the Atlantic Research Corporation and used a testing site for rocket fuel. After over 20 years of abandonment the house was bought by Currituck County in 1992 to be restored back to its original state. Today, the house is fully restored and now acts as a historic home for the public.

== Architecture ==
Corolla Island's exterior and interior feature Art Nouveau details; however, its shallow elongated shape recalls the arts-and-crafts-inspired cottages of the luxurious 1920s Philadelphia suburbs. The house's distinctive curving roofs and gables recall back to early rural buildings of Mrs. Knight's childhood home of Kamouraska, Quebec, Canada. The foundation commenced for a 21,000-square-foot house, with a 135-foot-long basement, complete with a French drainage system and brass piping laid for plumbing. The roof contains over 10,000 copper shingles that were hand-cut and laid.

=== Interiors ===
First Floor

The L-shaped first includes wooden walls that avoided the damages of the damp, humid coastal climate. On the first-floor hall, corduroy-textured walls were created through tongue-and-grooved panels to piece together the walls. Cork-tile floors reduced noise, as well as insulated heat. Tiffany lily shades in a cascading manner hang in a fixture just above the front door. Arts Nouveau details and doors with European Art Nouveau enfacements define the centralized front Foyer. The left-hand leg of the hall, lit by Tiffany Studio sconces with lily shades, leads to the library. Corolla Island was furnished with recycled furnishings from previous houses of the owners The social hub of the home contains original chandeliers and sconces as well as Art Nouveau furniture by Louis Majorelle, and a Steinway grand piano. Corolla Island's dining room, like its Library also features Art Nouveau architectural details. Framed with Art Nouveau inspired pocket doors, the room holds one of a kind Tiffany globe lighting made in the style of water lilies, a flower thought to be one of Mrs. Knight's favorites. To complement the unique lighting, hand carved impressions of lilies accent the wood paneling encompassing the room. Corolla Island's kitchen contains a dual fueled gas and coal/wood cook stove, a pair of electric refrigerators powered by motors located in the basement, worktables, two sinks as well as a vast amount of equipment. The rose-colored tiling of the kitchen was a feature added in honor of their head cook, Mary Rose Alvernas. The space provides ample natural lighting with large bay windows viewing out towards the Currituck Sound. The staff dining room served the full-time servants that traveled with the Knights. There is very little known of the original décor or contents, besides the original light-blue wall coloring, and one documented piece of furniture—a mission-style china cabinet as well as a gas stove. Based on auction records it is assumed that the Knights used simple sturdy Mission styled furniture for the remaining of the dining room pieces. The Gun Room, located between the formal area of the house and the servant's quarters indicates that, while this space held much activity, it was furnished as a purely utilitarian room. Furnishing included a gun rack, as well as a separate cabinet under for expensive items and hunting supplies. Positioned between the gunroom and the houses formal rooms, Edward Knights Office may have used to conduct various business dealings. The office reflects Knights diverse interests and activities of work, hunting, as well as artistic draftsmanship. While comfortable, the space shows features of a working office equipped with a handsome desk, a cast iron Rococo-inspired safe, chair(s), as well as small drawings done by Edward Knight.

Second Floor:

The second floor of the home contains separate master bedrooms for Mr. and Mrs. Knight. Louise Knight's bedroom suited her French heritage, featured with a large suite of blue-painted reproduction Louise XVI furniture, matching tables, side chairs, folding screen, and a chaise longue adapted to the French antique style popular in the 1920s. Connected is a private bathroom with a sink, mirror, toilet, bidet and claw-foot tub with separate faucets for fresh and salt water. A door connects the room with Edward Knight's bedroom; a shared porch connects the two rooms. Edward Knight Jr.'s bedroom décor recalled styles of the colonial era, reflecting many of his ancestors. Furnishings include Colonial revival interpretations of furniture, a high-post bed with pineapple finials, nightstand, as well as old-fashioned sconces. The four connected guest bedrooms are uniquely color coordinated, based on the Art Nouveau movement. Each room is titled by is designated color: The Lilac room, Green room, Pink room, and Blue room. Each room was comfortably furnished with 1920s mahogany furniture and accents (Dunbar 2009). Proceeding down the hall is additional rooms that would have served as servant's quarters for full-time staff.

Third Floor:

The third floor contains other bedrooms for full-time staff, as well as a flat for Mr. Knight's trusted Valet Mr. Starkey. The room housed Starkey as well as his wife Polly, and daughter Joan. The room would have been furnished with a full bed, a child's bed, chairs, folding screen, small storage closets, as well as a gas stove in order to heat the room during the winter months. Decoration included blue tile laid in the area holding the gas stove, as well as Tiffany glass light fixtures with iridescent wave accents.

Basement

The 6,000-square-foot basement required the right mix of soils and supports. Earth dredged from the new boat basin and canals anchored the brick walls. With eighteen-inch-thick (46 cm) walls, supported by steel beams framing the home, the basement was a feat within itself. The basement was a storage and service area, including 16 rooms, a wine cellar, root cellar, and laundry room with an electric washing machine. The space also housed bins capable of storing 125 tons of coal for a hot water heater as well as a furnace, radiating heat as high as the second floor. Today the basement displays exhibits, which further the history or the home and the times.
