= Robert Treat Paine (North Carolina politician) =

American politician

Robert Treat Paine (February 18, 1812 – February 8, 1872) was an American planter, ship builder and lawyer from Edenton, North Carolina. He served as a Colonel of volunteers in the Mexican–American War and represented North Carolina in the U.S. Congress as a Know Nothing. He was educated at Washington College (now Trinity College).

Paine moved to Texas in 1860 and resumed farming. He died in 1872 at Galveston and is buried in Prairie Lea Cemetery at Brenham, Texas.

U.S. House of Representatives
| Preceded by Henry M. Shaw | Member of the U.S. House of Representatives from North Carolina's 1st congressional district 1855–1857 | Succeeded by Henry M. Shaw |
