= Shawboro, North Carolina =

Unincorporated community in North Carolina, US

Coordinates: 36°24′20″N 76°05′39″W

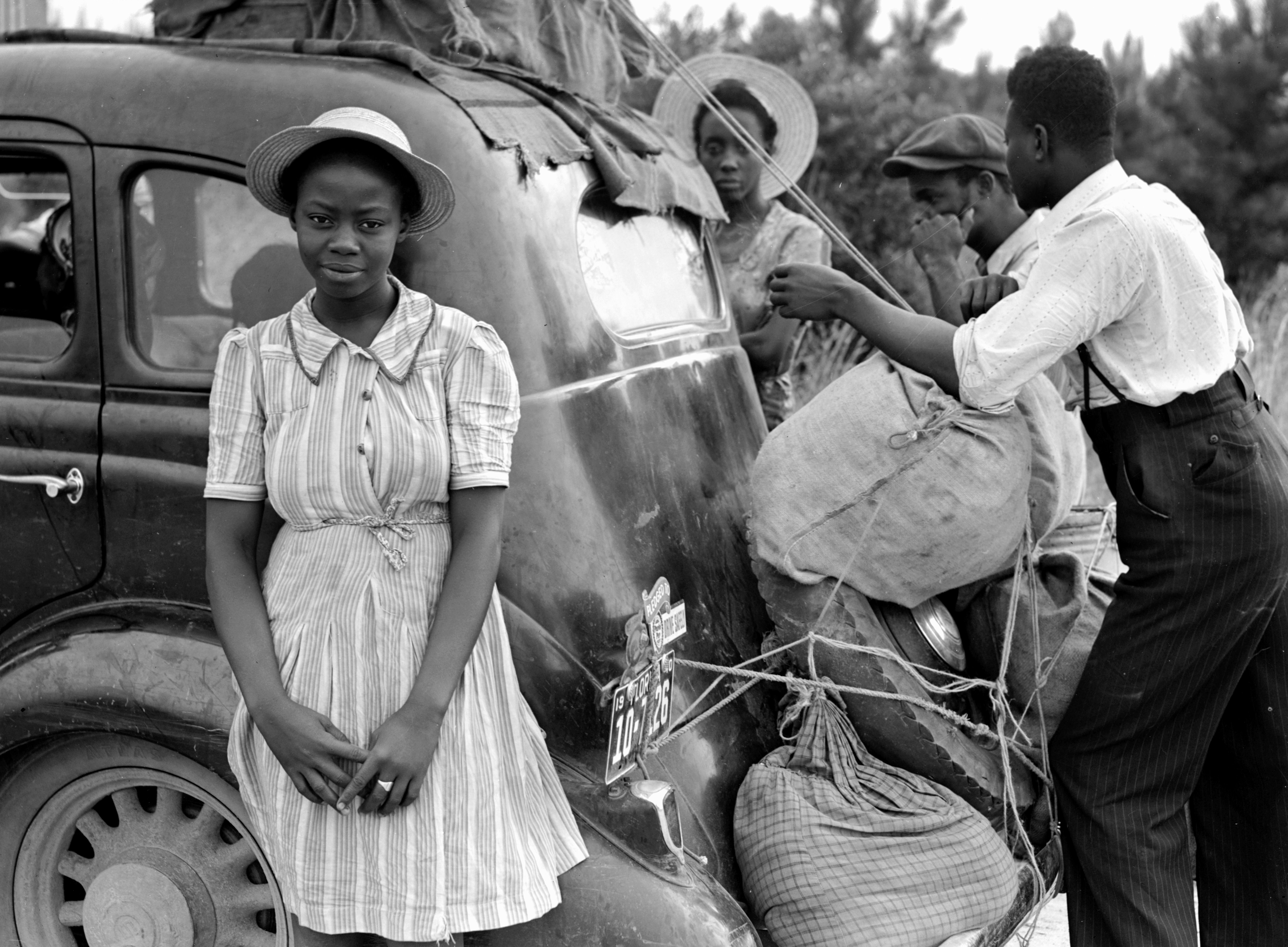
Migrant workers in Shawboro, c. 1940

Shawboro is an unincorporated community located in Currituck County, North Carolina, United States.

The area takes its name from Henry Marchmore Shaw.

The post office is located close to the intersection of Shawboro Road (NC 34) and North Indian Town Road (SR 1147). The ZIP Code is 27973. The Shawboro area is covered by three different telephone exchanges: Elizabeth City, Moyock, and Shiloh.

Shawboro is served by Crawford Township fire and rescue services as well as Shawboro Elementary School, a K–5 school with approximately 500 students.

Culong, the Shaw House, and Twin Houses are listed on the National Register of Historic Places.

== See also ==
- List of unincorporated communities in North Carolina
