= Poplar Branch, North Carolina =

Unincorporated community in North Carolina, US

Poplar Branch (formerly Currituck Narrows) is an unincorporated community in Currituck County, North Carolina, United States. It lies at an elevation of 13 feet (4.0 m).

The Baum Site was listed on the National Register of Historic Places in 1980.

Poplar Branch has a post office with the ZIP code 27965.
