= Grandy School =

Historic school building in North Carolina, United States

- U.S. National Register of Historic Places
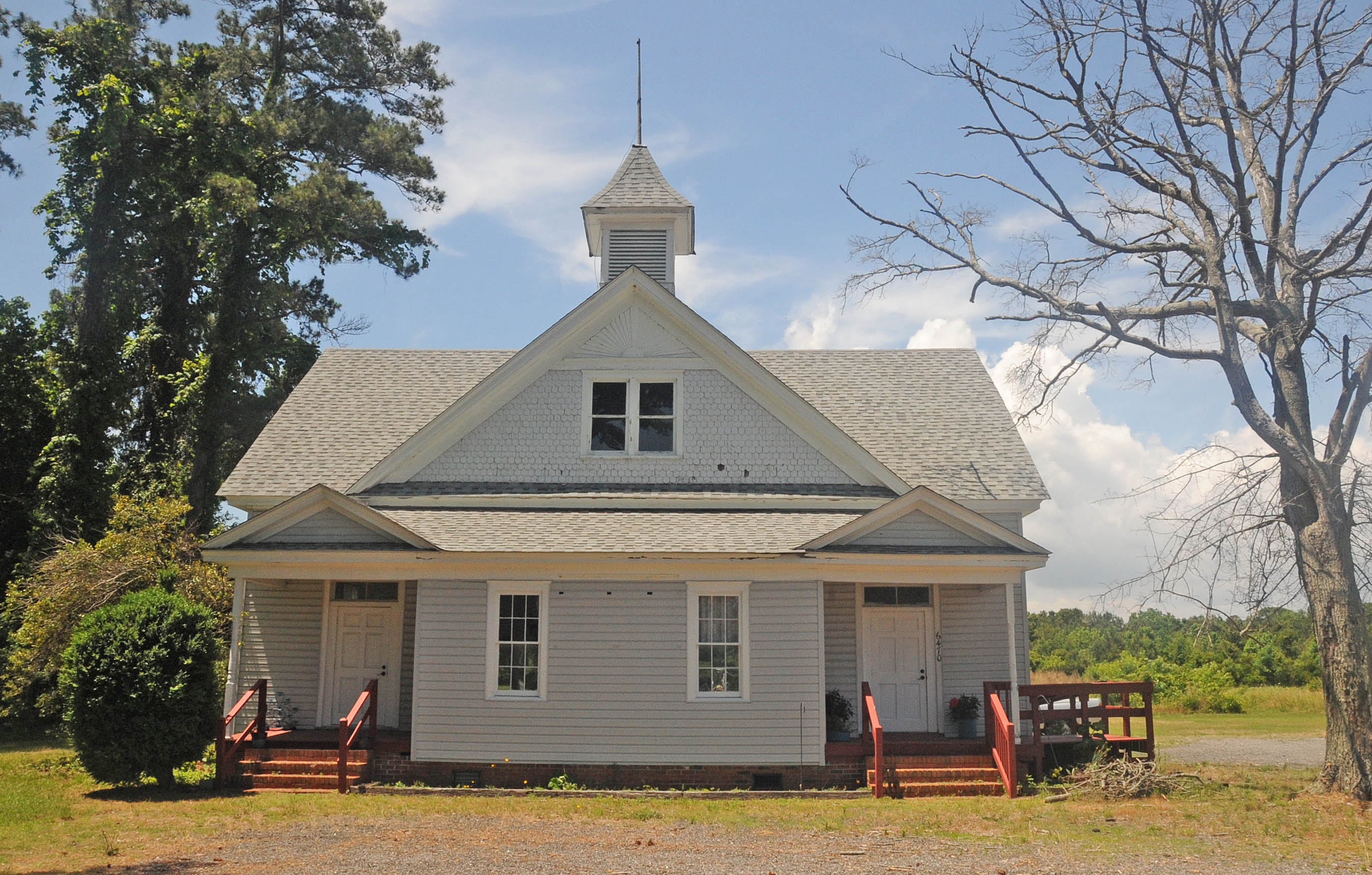

- Location within North Carolina Location within the United States
- Location: Jct. of US 158 and Poplar Branch Rd., Grandy, North Carolina
- Coordinates: 36°14′28″N 75°53′21″W
- Area: 0.8 acres (0.32 ha)
- Built: 1908
- Built by: Brown, James F.
- Architect: Barrett, Charles
- Architectural style: Late Victorian, Colonial Revival
- NRHP reference No.: 98001210
- Added to NRHP: September 25, 1998

Grandy School is a historic school building located at Grandy, Currituck County, North Carolina. It was built in 1908, and is a tall, one-story, frame building with Late Victorian and Colonial Revival style design elements. It has a gable roof and features a tall central bell tower.

It was listed on the National Register of Historic Places in 1998.
