= Grandy, North Carolina =

- Census-designated place
- Location within North Carolina Location within the United States
- Coordinates: 36°14′03″N 75°52′35″W
- Country: United States
- State: North Carolina
- County: Currituck

Area
  - Total: 7.72 sq mi (20.00 km^{2})
  - Land: 6.77 sq mi (17.54 km^{2})
  - Water: 0.95 sq mi (2.45 km^{2})
- Elevation: 10 ft (3.0 m)

Population (2020)
  - Total: 2,776
  - Density: 409.8/sq mi (158.24/km^{2})
- Time zone: UTC-5 (Eastern (EST))
  - Summer (DST): UTC-4 (EDT)
- ZIP code: 27939
- Area code: 252
- GNIS feature ID: 2812788

Grandy is an unincorporated community and census-designated place (CDP) in Currituck County, North Carolina, USA. It was first listed as a CDP in the 2020 census with a population of 2,776. It is located along US 158 between the Currituck Sound (on the east) and the North River (on the west).

It is the location of the Weeping Radish Farm and Brewery. Weeping Radish was shown on Diners, Drive-Ins and Dives.

On April 19, 1898, the first United States Post Office called Grandy Post Office was established. Caleb L. Grandy was the first postmaster.

The former Grandy School was listed on the National Register of Historic Places in 1998.

== Demographics ==
Historical population
Census	Pop.	Note	%±
2020	2,776		—
U.S. Decennial Census; 2020

=== 2020 census ===
As of the 2020 census, Grandy had a population of 2,776. The median age was 46.9 years. 19.0% of residents were under the age of 18 and 22.4% of residents were 65 years of age or older. For every 100 females there were 107.8 males, and for every 100 females age 18 and over there were 106.0 males age 18 and over.

0.0% of residents lived in urban areas, while 100.0% lived in rural areas.

There were 1,133 households in Grandy, of which 29.6% had children under the age of 18 living in them. Of all households, 51.9% were married-couple households, 17.4% were households with a male householder and no spouse or partner present, and 22.3% were households with a female householder and no spouse or partner present. About 22.8% of all households were made up of individuals and 13.1% had someone living alone who was 65 years of age or older.

There were 1,386 housing units, of which 18.3% were vacant. The homeowner vacancy rate was 1.8% and the rental vacancy rate was 6.9%.

Grandy CDP, North Carolina – Demographic Profile (NH = Non-Hispanic)
Race / Ethnicity	Pop 2020	% 2020
White alone (NH)	2,304	83.00%
Black or African American alone (NH)	100	3.60%
Native American or Alaska Native alone (NH)	14	0.50%
Asian alone (NH)	27	0.97%
Pacific Islander alone (NH)	1	0.04%
Some Other Race alone (NH)	12	0.43%
Mixed Race/Multi-Racial (NH)	164	5.91%
Hispanic or Latino (any race)	154	5.55%
Total	2,776	100.00%

Note: the US Census treats Hispanic/Latino as an ethnic category. This table excludes Latinos from the racial categories and assigns them to a separate category. Hispanics/Latinos can be of any race.
