= National Register of Historic Places listings in Camden County, North Carolina =

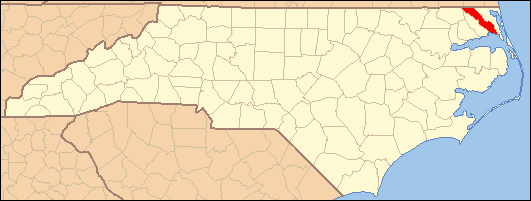

This list includes properties and districts listed on the National Register of Historic Places in Camden County, North Carolina. Click the "Map of all coordinates" link to the right to view an online map of all properties and districts with latitude and longitude coordinates in the table below.

== Current listings ==
This National Park Service list is complete through NPS recent listings posted March 14, 2025.

	Name on the Register	Image	Date listed	Location	City or town	Description
1	William Riley Abbott House	William Riley Abbott House	August 11, 1978 (#78001936)	SE of South Mills on SR 1224; 36°25′54″N 76°17′55″W	South Mills	
2	C.S.S. BLACK WARRIOR (two-masted schooner)		August 24, 2018 (#100002799)	Address Restricted	Elizabeth City	
3	Camden County Courthouse	Camden County Courthouse	February 1, 1972 (#72000928)	NC 343; 36°19′48″N 76°10′18″W	Camden	
4	Camden County Jail	Camden County Jail	May 3, 1984 (#84001950)	NC 343; 36°19′45″N 76°10′28″W	Camden	
5	Dismal Swamp Canal	Dismal Swamp Canal	June 6, 1988 (#88000528)	Runs between Chesapeake, VA and South Mills, NC; 36°26′54″N 76°19′42″W	South Mills	Extends into Chesapeake, Virginia
6	Caleb Grandy House	Caleb Grandy House	April 29, 1982 (#82003439)	Off SR 1145; 36°21′21″N 76°09′53″W	Belcross	
7	Lamb-Ferebee House		September 22, 1980 (#80002805)	NW of Camden on NC 343; 36°21′12″N 76°11′52″W	Camden	
8	Milford	Milford	March 16, 1972 (#72000929)	On SR 1205, 0.5 miles S of jct. with NC 343; 36°21′33″N 76°12′58″W	Camden	
9	SCUPPERNONG (two-masted schooner)		August 24, 2018 (#100002800)	Address Restricted	Shawboro	

== Former listings ==
	Name on the Register	Image	Date listed	Date removed	Location	City or town	Description
1	Widow's Son Masonic Lodge No. 75	Widow's Son Masonic Lodge No. 75	May 3, 1984 (#84001956)	March 5, 1985	NC 343	Camden	Delisted due to owner objection.

== See also ==
- National Register of Historic Places listings in North Carolina
- List of National Historic Landmarks in North Carolina
