= National Register of Historic Places listings in Chesapeake, Virginia =

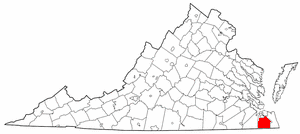
Location of Chesapeake in Virginia

This is a list of the National Register of Historic Places listings in Chesapeake, Virginia.

This is intended to be a complete list of the properties and districts on the National Register of Historic Places in the independent city of Chesapeake, Virginia, United States. The locations of National Register properties and districts for which the latitude and longitude coordinates are included below, may be seen in an online map.

There are 10 properties and districts listed on the National Register in the city.

This National Park Service list is complete through NPS recent listings posted March 13, 2026.

== Current listings ==
	Name on the Register	Image	Date listed	Location	Description
1	Albemarle and Chesapeake Canal Historic District	Albemarle and Chesapeake Canal Historic District	February 11, 2004 (#04000035)	Albemarle and Chesapeake Canal; 36°43′26″N 76°11′11″W	
2	Centreville-Fentress Historic District	Centreville-Fentress Historic District	June 23, 2003 (#03000562)	Roughly bounded by Fentress Rd., the Centerville Turnpike, Blue Ridge Rd., and Whittamore Rd. 36°41′50″N 76°11′03″W	
3	Cornland School	Cornland School	August 24, 2015 (#15000546)	5221 Glencoe St. 36°36′50″N 76°22′41″W	
4	Dismal Swamp Canal	Dismal Swamp Canal	June 6, 1988 (#88000528)	Runs between Chesapeake and South Mills, North Carolina; 36°42′14″N 76°21′20″W	Extends into Camden County, North Carolina
5	Great Bridge Battle Site	Great Bridge Battle Site	March 28, 1973 (#73002205)	Both sides of the Albemarle and Chesapeake Canal between Oak Grove and Great Bridge; 36°43′27″N 76°14′23″W	
6	Oaklette Historic District	Oaklette Historic District	June 23, 2003 (#03000563)	Roughly bounded by Indian River Rd. and Oaklette, Webster, St. Lawrence, and Seneca Sts. 36°49′41″N 76°14′14″W	
7	Old Portlock School No. 5	Old Portlock School No. 5	February 4, 2000 (#00000066)	3815 Bainbridge Boulevard; 36°47′14″N 76°16′52″W	
8	South Norfolk Historic District	South Norfolk Historic District	January 27, 1989 (#88003133)	Roughly bounded by Hull, Poindexter, D, 16th, and B Sts., and Seaboard, Richmond, and Byrd Aves. 36°48′55″N 76°16′29″W	
9	Sunray Agricultural Historic District	Sunray Agricultural Historic District	May 29, 2007 (#03000564)	Roughly bounded by the Great Dismal Swamp and Interstate 64; 36°46′30″N 76°25′12″W	
10	Wallaceton	Wallaceton	May 19, 1994 (#94000455)	3509 George Washington Highway, S. 36°36′50″N 76°22′44″W	

== See also ==
- List of National Historic Landmarks in Virginia
- National Register of Historic Places listings in Virginia
