= Camden County Schools =

Camden County Schools may refer to:

- Camden County Schools (North Carolina) in Camden County, North Carolina
- Camden County School District in Camden County, Georgia
- Camden County Technical Schools in Camden County, New Jersey
