= Camden County High School =

Camden County High School may refer to:

- Camden County High School (Georgia)
- Camden County High School (North Carolina)

== See also ==
- Camden High School (disambiguation)
