= Centreville Historic District =

Centreville Historic District or Centerville Historic District may refer to:

- Centreville Historic District (Centreville, Alabama), listed on the NRHP in Alabama
- Centreville Historic District (Centreville, Delaware), listed on the NRHP in Delaware
- Centerville Historic District (Centerville, Indiana), listed on the NRHP in Indiana
- Centreville Historic District (Centreville, Maryland), listed on the NRHP in Maryland
- Centerville Historic District (Barnstable, Massachusetts), listed on the NRHP in Massachusetts
- Centreville Historic District (Centreville, Mississippi), listed on the NRHP in Mississippi
- Centerville Historic District (Centerville, Ohio), listed on the NRHP in Ohio
- Centerville Historic District (Centerville, Pennsylvania), listed on the NRHP in Pennsylvania
- Centreville-Fentress Historic District, Chesapeake, VA, listed on the NRHP in Virginia
