= Camden County Courthouse =

Camden County Courthouse may refer to:

- Camden County Courthouse (Georgia), Woodbine, Georgia
- Camden County Courthouse (North Carolina), Camden, North Carolina
- Camden County Hall of Justice, Camden, New Jersey
