= North River Game Land =

Coordinates: 36.31758°N 75.988612°W

The North River Game Land is a North Carolina state game land located north of the Albemarle Sound, in Camden and Currituck counties in the state of North Carolina, United States.
