= 2000 United States presidential election in North Carolina =

- November 7, 2000
- Turnout: 58.88% (▲0.12 pp)

Nominee	George W. Bush	Al Gore
Party	Republican	Democratic
Home state	Texas	Tennessee
Running mate	Dick Cheney	Joe Lieberman
Electoral vote	14	0
Popular vote	1,631,163	1,257,692
Percentage	56.03%	43.20%

Bush
50–60%
60–70%
70–80%
Gore
40–50%
50–60%
60–70%
President before election
Bill Clinton
Democratic
Elected President
George W. Bush
Republican

The 2000 United States presidential election in North Carolina took place on November 7, 2000, and was part of the 2000 United States presidential election. Voters chose 14 representatives, or electors, to the Electoral College, who voted for president and vice president.

North Carolina was won by Governor George W. Bush with a 12.83% margin of victory. Bush won most of the counties and congressional districts of the state. He won nine of the twelve districts, and also won the most populated counties including Forsyth County (home to Winston-Salem) with 56%, Wake County (home to the state's capital, Raleigh) with 53%, Guilford County (home to Greensboro) with 51%, and Mecklenburg County (home to the state's largest city, Charlotte) with 51% of the vote.

As of the 2024 presidential election, this is the last election in which Guilford County and Mecklenburg County voted for a Republican presidential candidate. This is also the last election in which Columbus County, Chowan County, and Tyrrell County voted for a Democratic presidential candidate.

== General election ==
=== Polling ===
Poll source	Date(s)	Sample size	Margin of error	George W. Bush (R)	Al Gore (D)	Other / undecided (Note: Calculated by taking the difference of 100% and all other candidates combined.)
SurveyUSA	November 4, 2000	500	—	56%	39%	5%
Harris Insights & Analytics	November 3, 2000	6,704	—	51%	46%	3%
Rasmussen Reports	November 1, 2000	1,163	—	50%	40%	10%
Research 2000	October 31, 2000	405	—	52%	42%	6%
Mason-Dixon Polling & Strategy	October 29, 2000	625	—	48%	41%	11%
SurveyUSA	October 29, 2000	500	—	54%	41%	5%

=== Results ===
2000 United States presidential election in North Carolina
Party	Candidate	Votes	Percentage	Electoral votes
Republican	George W. Bush	1,631,163	56.03%	14
Democratic	Al Gore	1,257,692	43.20%	0
Libertarian	Harry Browne	12,307	0.42%	0
Reform	Patrick Buchanan	8,874	0.30%	0
Write-In	David McReynolds	1,226	0.04%	0
Totals		2,911,262	100.00%	14
Voter turnout (voting age/registered)				48%/57%

==== Results by county ====
County	George W. Bush Republican		Al Gore Democratic		Various candidates Other parties		Margin		Total
County	#	%	#	%	#	%	#	%	Total
Alamance	29,305	62.23%	17,459	37.08%	227	0.69%	11,846	25.15%	47,091
Alexander	9,242	68.50%	4,166	30.88%	79	0.63%	5,076	37.62%	13,492
Alleghany	2,531	58.68%	1,715	39.76%	67	1.55%	816	18.92%	4,313
Anson	3,161	39.59%	4,792	60.01%	32	0.40%	-1,631	-20.42%	7,985
Ashe	6,226	60.35%	4,011	38.88%	79	0.77%	2,215	21.47%	10,316
Avery	4,956	74.04%	1,686	25.19%	52	0.78%	3,270	48.85%	6,694
Beaufort	10,531	60.83%	6,634	38.32%	148	0.85%	3,897	22.51%	17,313
Bertie	2,488	34.67%	4,660	64.94%	28	0.39%	-2,172	-30.27%	7,176
Bladen	4,977	45.63%	5,889	53.99%	42	0.39%	-912	-8.36%	10,908
Brunswick	15,427	53.49%	13,118	45.49%	294	0.69%	2,309	8.00%	28,839
Buncombe	46,101	53.93%	38,545	45.09%	830	0.97%	7,556	8.84%	85,476
Burke	18,466	60.23%	11,924	38.89%	268	0.88%	6,542	21.34%	30,658
Cabarrus	32,704	66.23%	16,284	32.98%	393	0.80%	16,420	33.16%	49,381
Caldwell	17,337	66.39%	8,588	32.89%	190	0.72%	8,749	33.50%	26,115
Camden	1,628	57.51%	1,187	41.93%	16	0.57%	441	15.58%	2,831
Carteret	17,381	65.69%	8,839	33.40%	241	0.91%	8,542	32.14%	26,461
Caswell	4,270	50.70%	4,091	48.58%	61	0.73%	179	2.12%	8,422
Catawba	34,244	67.36%	16,246	31.95%	351	0.59%	17,998	35.41%	50,841
Chatham	10,248	48.96%	10,461	49.98%	222	1.07%	-213	-1.02%	20,931
Cherokee	6,305	65.17%	3,239	33.48%	130	1.35%	3,066	31.69%	9,674
Chowan	2,415	49.39%	2,430	49.69%	45	0.92%	-15	-0.30%	4,890
Clay	2,416	62.72%	1,361	35.33%	75	1.95%	1,055	27.39%	3,852
Cleveland	19,064	58.22%	13,455	41.09%	227	0.69%	5,609	17.13%	32,746
Columbus	8,342	45.28%	9,986	54.20%	97	0.53%	-1,644	-8.92%	18,425
Craven	19,494	60.95%	12,213	38.18%	278	0.87%	7,281	22.77%	31,985
Cumberland	38,129	49.42%	38,626	50.07%	396	0.52%	-497	-0.65%	77,151
Currituck	4,095	60.77%	2,595	38.51%	49	0.73%	1,500	22.26%	6,739
Dare	7,301	56.15%	5,589	42.99%	112	0.86%	1,712	13.16%	13,002
Davidson	35,387	67.99%	16,199	31.12%	461	0.88%	19,188	36.87%	52,047
Davie	10,184	72.75%	3,651	26.08%	163	1.17%	6,533	46.67%	13,998
Duplin	7,840	54.48%	6,475	45.00%	75	0.52%	1,365	9.48%	14,390
Durham	30,150	35.64%	53,907	63.72%	547	0.64%	-23,757	-28.08%	84,604
Edgecombe	6,836	37.56%	11,315	62.16%	51	0.28%	-4,479	-24.60%	18,202
Forsyth	67,700	55.98%	52,457	43.37%	785	0.65%	15,243	12.61%	120,942
Franklin	8,501	52.96%	7,454	46.44%	96	0.60%	1,047	6.52%	16,051
Gaston	39,453	66.67%	19,281	32.58%	445	0.75%	20,172	34.09%	59,179
Gates	1,480	42.95%	1,944	56.41%	22	0.64%	-464	-13.46%	3,446
Graham	2,304	68.55%	1,006	29.93%	51	1.51%	1,298	38.62%	3,361
Granville	7,364	48.47%	7,733	50.90%	97	0.64%	-369	-2.43%	15,194
Greene	3,353	57.12%	2,478	42.21%	39	0.66%	875	14.91%	5,870
Guilford	84,394	50.76%	80,787	48.59%	1,083	0.65%	3,607	2.17%	166,264
Halifax	6,698	39.47%	10,222	60.24%	50	0.29%	-3,524	-20.77%	16,970
Harnett	14,762	61.08%	9,155	37.88%	250	1.04%	5,607	23.20%	24,167
Haywood	12,118	54.41%	9,793	43.97%	362	1.63%	2,325	10.44%	22,273
Henderson	25,688	66.54%	12,562	32.54%	357	0.92%	13,126	34.00%	38,607
Hertford	2,382	30.16%	5,484	69.44%	31	0.39%	-3,102	-39.28%	7,897
Hoke	3,439	40.07%	5,017	58.46%	126	1.47%	-1,578	-18.39%	8,582
Hyde	1,132	50.60%	1,088	48.64%	17	0.76%	44	1.96%	2,237
Iredell	29,853	65.49%	15,434	33.86%	299	0.66%	14,419	31.63%	45,586
Jackson	6,237	51.46%	5,722	47.21%	162	1.34%	515	4.25%	12,121
Johnston	27,212	66.12%	13,704	33.30%	239	0.58%	13,508	32.82%	41,155
Jones	2,114	53.33%	1,822	45.96%	28	0.71%	292	7.37%	3,964
Lee	9,406	57.77%	6,785	41.67%	92	0.56%	2,621	16.10%	16,283
Lenoir	11,512	54.40%	9,527	45.02%	124	0.59%	1,985	9.38%	21,163
Lincoln	15,951	65.03%	8,412	34.29%	166	0.68%	7,539	30.74%	24,529
Macon	8,406	63.52%	4,683	35.39%	145	1.09%	3,723	28.13%	13,234
Madison	4,676	56.17%	3,505	42.10%	144	1.73%	1,171	14.07%	8,325
Martin	4,420	47.19%	4,929	52.63%	17	0.18%	-509	-5.44%	9,366
McDowell	9,109	65.01%	4,747	33.88%	155	1.11%	4,362	31.13%	14,011
Mecklenburg	134,068	50.97%	126,911	48.25%	2,057	0.78%	7,157	2.72%	263,036
Mitchell	4,984	75.52%	1,535	23.26%	81	1.22%	3,449	52.26%	6,600
Montgomery	4,946	55.11%	3,979	44.34%	49	0.55%	967	10.77%	8,974
Moore	19,882	63.52%	11,232	35.88%	187	0.60%	8,650	27.64%	31,301
Nash	17,995	58.97%	12,376	40.56%	142	0.47%	5,619	18.41%	30,513
New Hanover	36,503	55.04%	29,292	44.17%	524	0.79%	7,211	10.87%	66,319
Northampton	2,667	32.52%	5,513	67.23%	20	0.24%	-2,846	-34.71%	8,200
Onslow	19,657	65.06%	10,269	33.99%	289	0.95%	9,388	31.07%	30,215
Orange	17,930	36.34%	30,921	62.66%	493	0.99%	-12,991	-26.32%	49,344
Pamlico	2,999	57.21%	2,188	41.74%	55	1.05%	811	15.47%	5,242
Pasquotank	4,943	45.34%	5,874	53.88%	86	0.79%	-931	-8.54%	10,903
Pender	7,661	54.13%	6,415	45.32%	78	0.55%	1,246	8.81%	14,154
Perquimans	2,230	51.79%	2,033	47.21%	43	0.99%	197	4.58%	4,306
Person	6,722	56.81%	5,042	42.61%	69	0.58%	1,680	14.20%	11,833
Pitt	23,192	53.84%	19,685	45.70%	198	0.46%	3,507	8.14%	43,075
Polk	5,074	61.11%	3,114	37.50%	115	1.39%	1,960	23.61%	8,303
Randolph	30,959	72.51%	11,366	26.62%	371	0.87%	19,593	45.89%	42,696
Richmond	6,263	43.89%	7,935	55.61%	71	0.50%	-1,672	-11.72%	14,269
Robeson	11,721	39.40%	17,834	59.95%	192	0.64%	-6,113	-20.55%	29,747
Rockingham	18,979	58.35%	13,260	40.76%	289	0.89%	5,719	17.59%	32,528
Rowan	28,922	65.53%	14,891	33.74%	320	0.72%	14,031	31.79%	44,133
Rutherford	13,755	63.34%	7,697	35.44%	264	1.22%	6,058	27.90%	21,716
Sampson	10,410	54.11%	8,768	45.57%	61	0.32%	1,642	8.54%	19,239
Scotland	3,740	39.77%	5,627	59.84%	36	0.39%	-1,887	-20.07%	9,403
Stanly	15,548	68.14%	7,066	30.97%	204	0.89%	8,482	37.17%	22,818
Stokes	12,028	70.00%	5,030	29.27%	124	0.73%	6,998	40.73%	17,182
Surry	15,401	65.93%	7,757	33.21%	200	0.85%	7,644	32.72%	23,358
Swain	2,224	50.89%	2,097	47.99%	49	1.12%	127	2.90%	4,370
Transylvania	9,011	63.35%	5,044	35.46%	170	1.20%	3,967	27.89%	14,225
Tyrrell	706	45.08%	849	54.21%	11	0.70%	-143	-9.13%	1,566
Union	31,876	67.59%	14,890	31.57%	395	0.83%	16,986	36.02%	47,161
Vance	5,564	43.81%	7,092	55.84%	45	0.35%	-1,528	-12.03%	12,701
Wake	142,494	53.13%	123,466	46.03%	2,260	0.84%	19,028	7.10%	268,220
Warren	2,202	32.41%	4,576	67.34%	17	0.25%	-2,374	-34.93%	6,795
Washington	2,169	44.36%	2,704	55.30%	17	0.35%	-535	-10.94%	4,890
Watauga	10,438	55.75%	7,959	42.51%	326	1.74%	2,479	13.24%	18,723
Wayne	20,758	61.26%	13,005	38.38%	121	0.36%	7,753	22.88%	33,884
Wilkes	16,826	69.18%	7,226	29.71%	271	1.11%	9,600	39.47%	24,323
Wilson	13,466	54.24%	11,266	45.38%	94	0.38%	2,200	8.86%	24,826
Yadkin	10,435	76.27%	3,127	22.85%	120	0.88%	7,308	53.42%	13,682
Yancey	4,970	56.71%	3,714	42.38%	80	0.91%	1,256	14.33%	8,764
Totals	1,631,163	56.03%	1,257,692	43.20%	22,407	0.77%	373,471	12.83%	2,911,262

===== Counties that flipped from Democratic to Republican =====
- Buncombe (largest city: Asheville)
- Camden (largest city: Camden)
- Caswell (largest city: Yanceyville)
- Duplin (largest city: Wallace)
- Franklin (largest city: Wake Forest)
- Guilford (largest city: Greensboro)
- Haywood (largest city: Waynesville)
- Hyde (largest city: Swan Quarter)
- Jackson (largest city: Sylva)
- Jones (largest city: Maysville)
- Madison (largest city: Mars Hill)
- Mecklenburg (largest city: Charlotte)
- Montgomery (largest city: Troy)
- Perquimans (largest city: Hertford)
- Swain (largest city: Cherokee)

==== By congressional district ====
Bush won nine of 12 congressional districts, including two held by Democrats.

District	Bush	Gore	Representative
1st	41%	58%	Eva Clayton
2nd	55%	44%	Bob Etheridge
3rd	61%	38%	Walter B. Jones
4th	47%	52%	David Price
5th	63%	36%	Richard Burr
6th	65%	34%	Howard Coble
7th	53%	47%	Mike McIntyre
8th	56%	43%	Robin Hayes
9th	61%	38%	Sue Wilkins Myrick
10th	66%	33%	Cass Ballenger
11th	59%	40%	Charles H. Taylor
12th	37%	62%	Mel Watt

== Electors ==
Technically the voters of North Carolina cast their ballots for electors: representatives to the Electoral College. North Carolina is allocated 14 electors because it has 12 congressional districts and two senators. All candidates who appear on the ballot or qualify to receive write-in votes must submit a list of 14 electors, who pledge to vote for their candidate and his or her running mate. Whoever wins the majority of votes in the state is awarded all 14 electoral votes. Their chosen electors then vote for president and vice president. Although electors are pledged to their candidate and running mate, they are not obligated to vote for them. An elector who votes for someone other than his or her candidate is known as a faithless elector.

The electors of each state and the District of Columbia met on December 18, 2000 to cast their votes for president and vice president. The Electoral College itself never meets as one body. Instead, the electors from each state and the District of Columbia met in their respective capitols.

The following were the members of the Electoral College from the state. All were pledged to and voted for George W. Bush and Dick Cheney:

1. Fran Barnhart
2. Claude Billings
3. Sam Currin
4. Tom Dwiggins
5. A. Dial Gray
6. Barbara Holt
7. Marshall Hurley
8. Margaret King
9. Jeff Mixon
10. Joe L. Morgan
11. Steve Rader
12. Robert Rector
13. Dewitt Rhoades
14. Linda Young
