= Caleb Grandy House =

Historic house in North Carolina, United States

- U.S. National Register of Historic Places
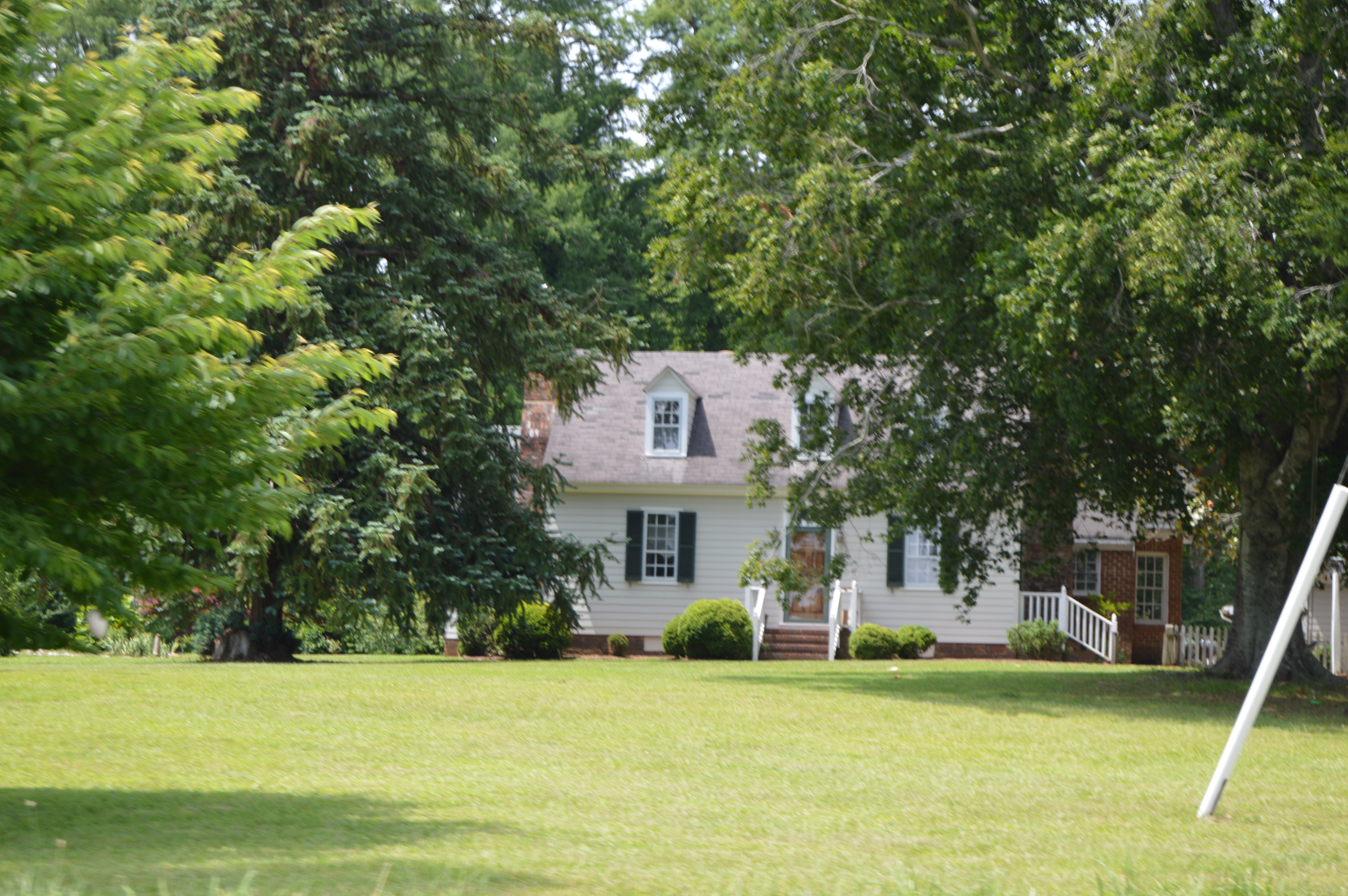
- Front

- Location within North Carolina Location within the United States
- Nearest city: Off SR 1145, near Belcross, North Carolina
- Coordinates: 36°21′08″N 76°10′02″W
- Area: 57.3 acres (23.2 ha)
- Built: c. 1787
- Architectural style: Early Republic, Late Georgian
- NRHP reference No.: 82003439
- Added to NRHP: April 29, 1982

Caleb Grandy House is a historic home located near Belcross, Camden County, North Carolina. It was built about 1787, and is a 1 1/2-story, hall-and-parlor plan Late Georgian style dwelling. It has a gable roof and one-story shed-roof porch. It features massive paved, double shouldered chimneys at the gable ends. The house was restored in the 1940s by architect Frank Dawson.

It was listed on the National Register of Historic Places in 1982.
