= Lamb-Ferebee House =

Historic house in North Carolina, United States

- U.S. National Register of Historic Places
- Location within North Carolina Location within the United States
- Location: NW of Camden on NC 343, near Camden, North Carolina
- Coordinates: 36°21′07″N 76°11′46″W
- Area: 3.2 acres (1.3 ha)
- Built: 1825
- Architectural style: Federal
- NRHP reference No.: 80002805
- Added to NRHP: September 22, 1980

Lamb-Ferebee House is a historic home located near Camden, Camden County, North Carolina. It was built about 1825, and is a two-story, double-pile, nearly square frame Federal style dwelling. It has a gable roof and one-story shed-roof porch.

It was listed on the National Register of Historic Places in 1980.
