= Camden County Schools (North Carolina) =

School district in North Carolina, US

Location
- Camden County, North Carolina United States

District information
- Type: Public
- Grades: PK–12
- Superintendent: Melvin Hawkins
- Accreditation: AdvancED
- Schools: 5
- Budget: $ 18,394,000
- NCES District ID: 3700600

Students and staff
- Students: 1,958
- Teachers: 126.09 (on FTE basis)
- Staff: 132.99 (on FTE basis)
- Student–teacher ratio: 15.53:1

Other information
- Website: ccsnc.org

Camden County Schools is a PK–12 graded school district serving Camden County, North Carolina. Its five schools serve 1,958 students as of the 2010–2011 school year.

== History ==
The Camden County Schools system was really a small system with only three schools (one each of elementary, middle, and high schools) as late as 2006. By 2008, however, the system had added a new high school and an intermediate elementary school. As of 2021, work has begun on the construction of a new high school, set to combine and replace the current high school and early college.

== Student demographics ==
As of the 2013–2014 school year, Camden County Schools had a total population of 1,903 students and 126.09 teachers on a (FTE) basis. This produced a student-teacher ratio of 15.17:1. As of the 2010–2011 school year, out of the student total, the gender ratio was 60% male to 40% female. The demographic group makeup was: White, 79%; Black, 13%; Hispanic, 3%; American Indian, 0%; and Asian/Pacific Islander, 1% (two or more races: 3%). For the same school year, 31.22% of the students received free and reduced-cost lunches.

== Governance ==
The primary governing body of Camden County Schools follows a council–manager government format with a five-member Board of Education appointing a Superintendent to run the day-to-day operations of the system. The school system currently resides in the North Carolina State Board of Education's First District.

=== Board of education ===
The five members of the Board of Education generally meet on the second Thursday of each month. The current members of the board are: Chris M. Wilson (chair), Christian Overton (Vice-chair), Steve M. Needham, Jason A. Banks, and Sissy Aydlett.

=== Superintendent ===
The current superintendent of Camden County Schools is Melvin Hawkins. He was appointed in August, 2010, to replace former superintendent Ron Melchiorre. Hawkins was previously the principal at Camden County High School.

== Member schools ==
Camden County Schools has four schools ranging from pre-kindergarten to twelfth grade. Those four schools are separated into two high schools, one middle school, and two elementary schools. All of the schools are located near the town of Camden.

=== High schools ===
- Camden County High School, grades 9–12
- Camden Early College, grades 9–12

=== Middle schools ===
- Camden Middle School, grades 6-8

=== Intermediate schools ===
- Camden Intermediate School, grades 3–5

=== Primary schools ===
- Grandy Primary School, grades K–2

== Athletics ==
According to the North Carolina High School Athletic Association, for the 2015–2016 school year:

- Camden High is a 1A school in the Coastal 10 Conference.
- Camden Early College does not have athletic teams, but students in the school can participate under Camden High.

== See also ==
- List of school districts in North Carolina
