= Camden County High School (North Carolina) =

American public school in North Carolina

Location
- 103 U.S. Highway W Camden, North Carolina 27921; United States
- Coordinates: 36°19′37″N 76°10′18″W

Information
- Established: 1952 (74 years ago)
- Principal: Amber Davis
- Staff: 36.48 (FTE)
- Grades: 9–12
- Enrollment: 453 (2023-2024)
- Student to teacher ratio: 12.42
- Colors: Blue and white
- Team name: Bruins
- Website: cchs.ccsnc.org

Camden County High School is centrally located in Camden County, North Carolina. It is one of two high schools in the Camden County Schools system.

Camden County is a county bordering Pasquotank County, Currituck County, and the Virginia border. It is around a 45-minute drive from the Outer Banks of North Carolina.
