= Camden County Jail =

Historic former jail in North Carolina, US

- U.S. National Register of Historic Places
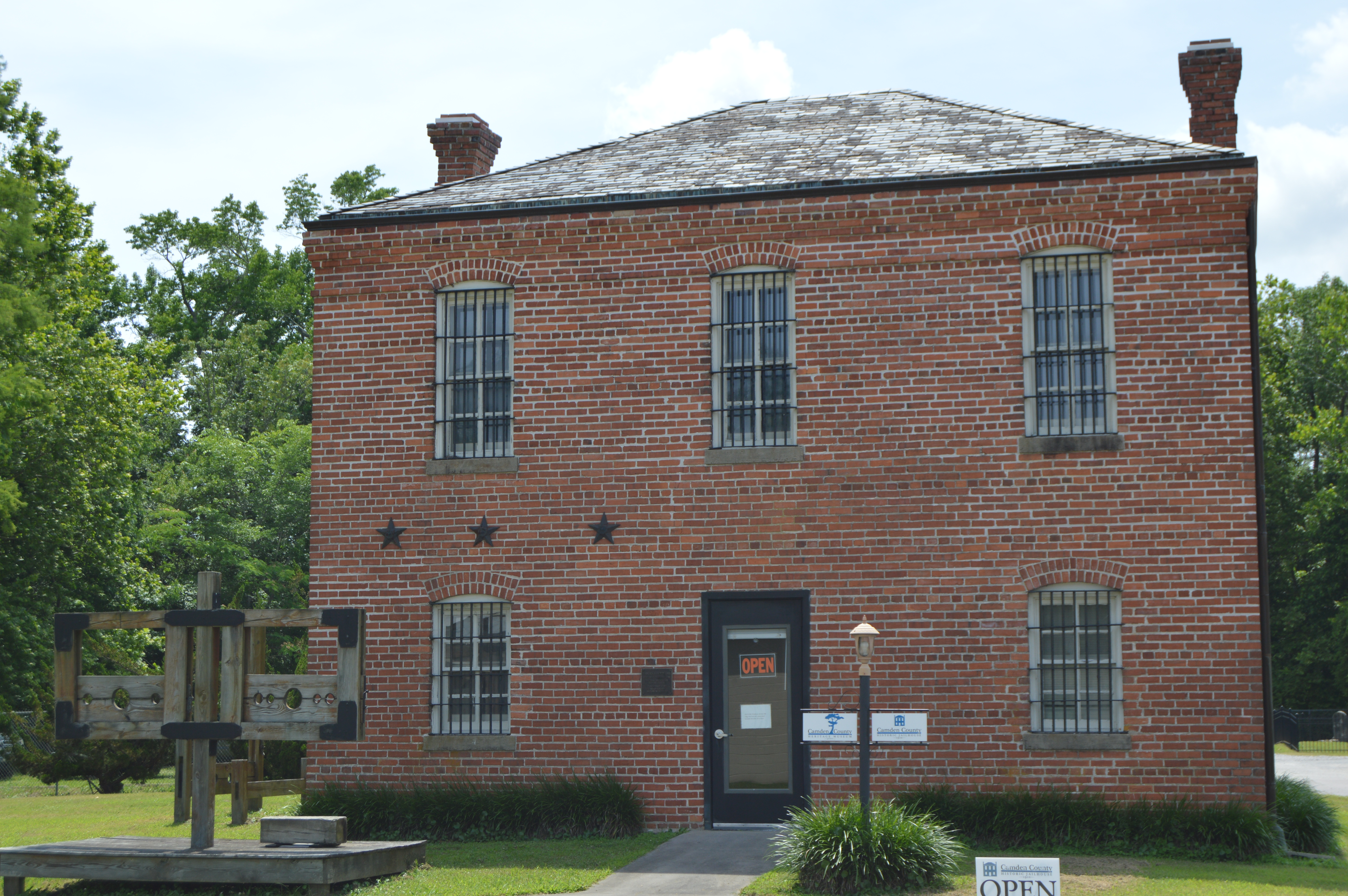
- Front

- Location within North Carolina Location within the United States
- Location: NC 343, Camden, North Carolina
- Coordinates: 36°19′44″N 76°10′30″W
- Area: 3.5 acres (1.4 ha)
- Built: 1910
- Built by: Stewart Jail Works Co.; Southern Jail Building Co.
- Architectural style: Colonial Revival
- NRHP reference No.: 84001950
- Added to NRHP: May 3, 1984

Camden County Jail is a historic county jail located at Camden, Camden County, North Carolina. It was built in 1910, and is a two-story, nearly square brick building with a high hipped roof in the Colonial Revival style. On the second floor is the iron cellblock or "bullpen," likened to that of a large metal box.

The historic jail is now home to the Camden County Board of Elections and Camden County's Museum. It is open to the public during regular office hours.

It was listed on the National Register of Historic Places in 1984.
