= William Riley Abbott House =

Historic house in North Carolina, United States

- U.S. National Register of Historic Places
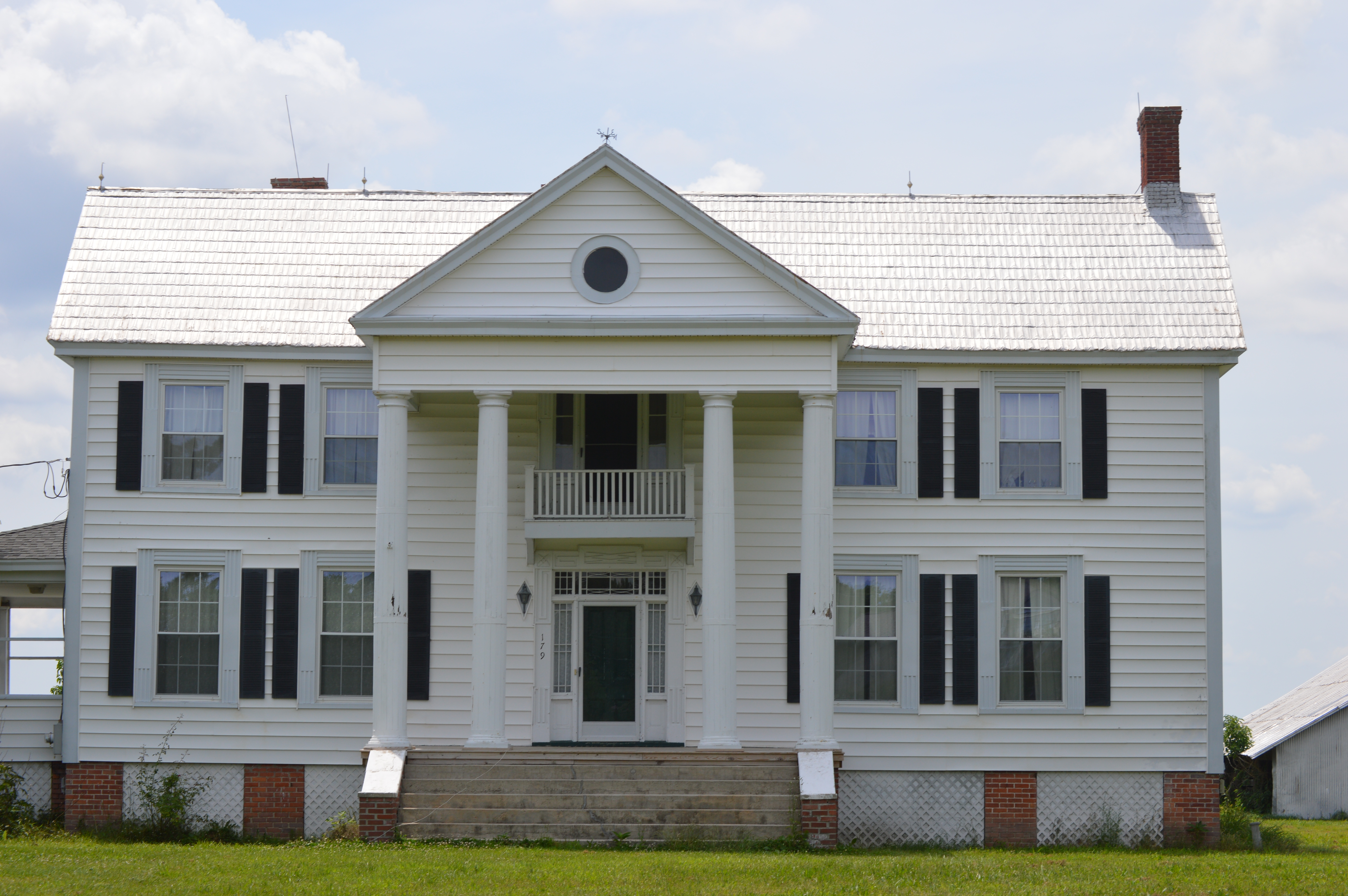
- Front

- Location within North Carolina Location within the United States
- Location: SE of South Mills on SR 1224, near South Mills, North Carolina
- Coordinates: 36°25′54″N 76°18′01″W
- Area: 120 acres (49 ha)
- Built: 1850
- Architectural style: Greek Revival
- NRHP reference No.: 78001936
- Added to NRHP: August 11, 1978

William Riley Abbott House is a historic plantation house located near South Mills, Camden County, North Carolina. It was built about 1850 with the profits of the forced labor of about 40 enslaved people, and is a two-story, five-bay, Greek Revival-style frame dwelling. It has a vernacular Colonial Revival style portico that dates from the 1920s.

It was listed on the National Register of Historic Places in 1978.
