= Milford (Camden, North Carolina) =

Historic house in North Carolina, United States

- U.S. National Register of Historic Places
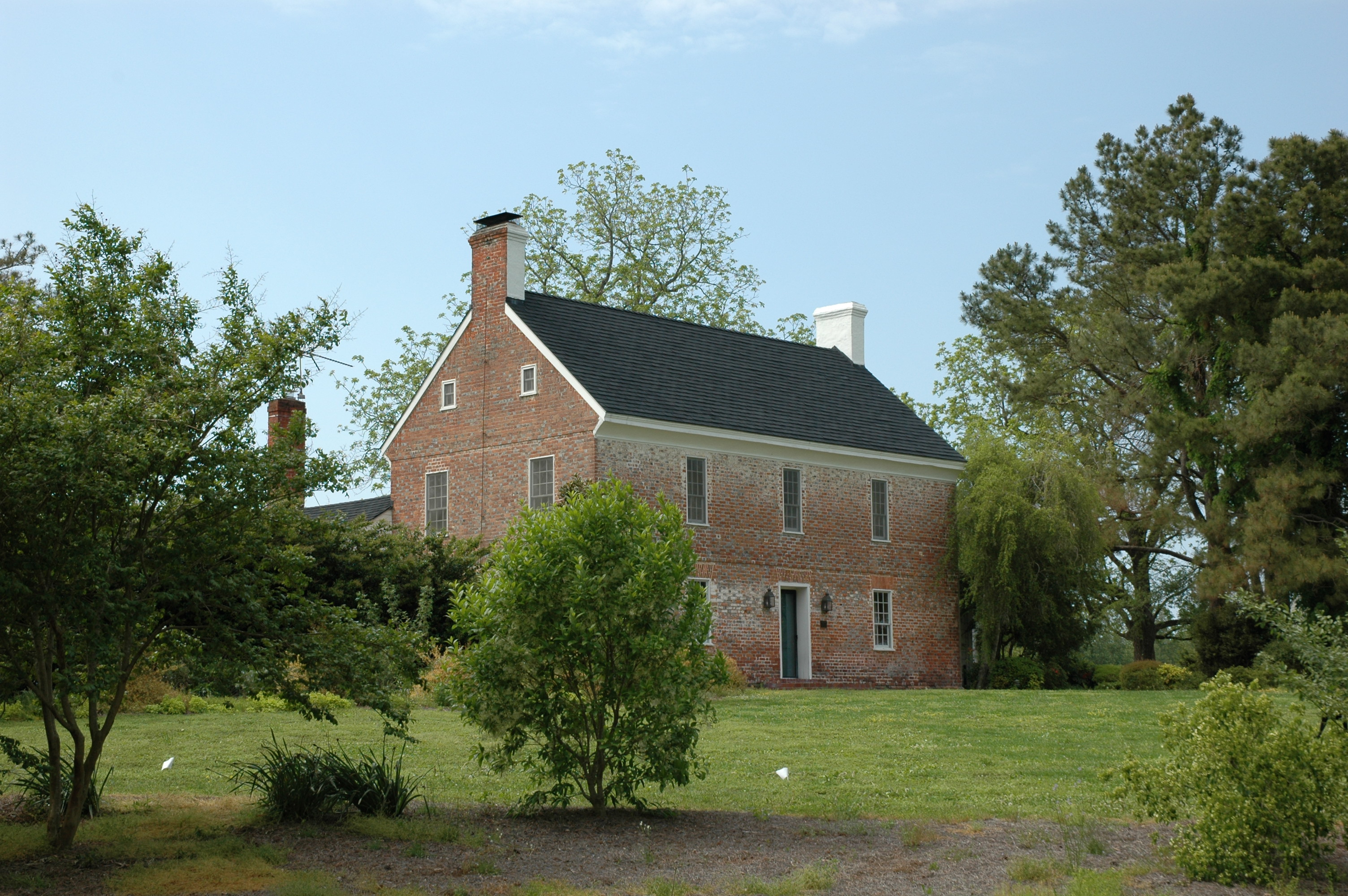

- Location within North Carolina Location within the United States
- Location: On SR 1205, 0.5 miles S of jct. with NC 343, near Camden, North Carolina
- Coordinates: 36°21′33″N 76°12′58″W
- Area: 8 acres (3.2 ha)
- Built: 1746
- NRHP reference No.: 72000929
- Added to NRHP: March 16, 1972

Milford, also known as the Relfe-Grice-Sawyer House, is the oldest two-story brick home located near Camden, Camden County, North Carolina, United States.

Its 1746 construction date is carved on a brick on the interior face of the north chimney & was confirmed by dendrochronology test in the 1990s. The formal two-story brick gabled structure, two bays deep and three bays wide, has interior end chimneys terminating in molded caps.

The brickwork is of Flemish bond with glazed headers, featuring three-course stringers of Flemish bond between the first and second stories and at the base of the gables. The use of one-to-three common bond in the brick of the south gable represents the earliest known example of this type of bonding in North Carolina. The north gable probably corresponds, but the entire north side is now concealed by stucco. Tumbling of the brick occurs along the rakes of the south gable. Tumbled bricks are usually placed at right angles to the gable slope, and the vertical placement of these bricks is, according to Thomas Waterman in The Early Architecture of North Carolina, found in only one other structure, the Wallop house in Accomack County, Virginia.

The west facade formerly functioned as the principal front, but the main entrance is located now in the central bay of the east facade. The doorway as well as the windows of the first story are ornamented only by flat arches serving as lintels. The windows of the second story, set quite close to the cornice, are completely plain. The lintels are formed of rowlocks which originally surmounted the south gable windows are still visible, although the windows are now much smaller.

The great plaster cove cornices, believed by Waterman to be unique in colonial architecture south of Maryland, further enhance the monumentality of the house.

It was listed on the National Register of Historic Places in 1972.
