= Camden High School =

Camden High School may refer to:

- Camden High School in Camden, Arkansas, merged to become Camden-Fairview High School
- Camden High School (New Jersey)
- Camden High School (Camden, New York)
- Camden High School (Camden, South Carolina)
- Camden High School (Minneapolis, Minnesota)
- Camden High School (San Jose, California)
- Camden High School (New South Wales) (Australia)

== See also ==
- Camden County High School (disambiguation)
