= Morgan House (South Mills, North Carolina) =

Historic house in North Carolina, United States

- U.S. National Register of Historic Places
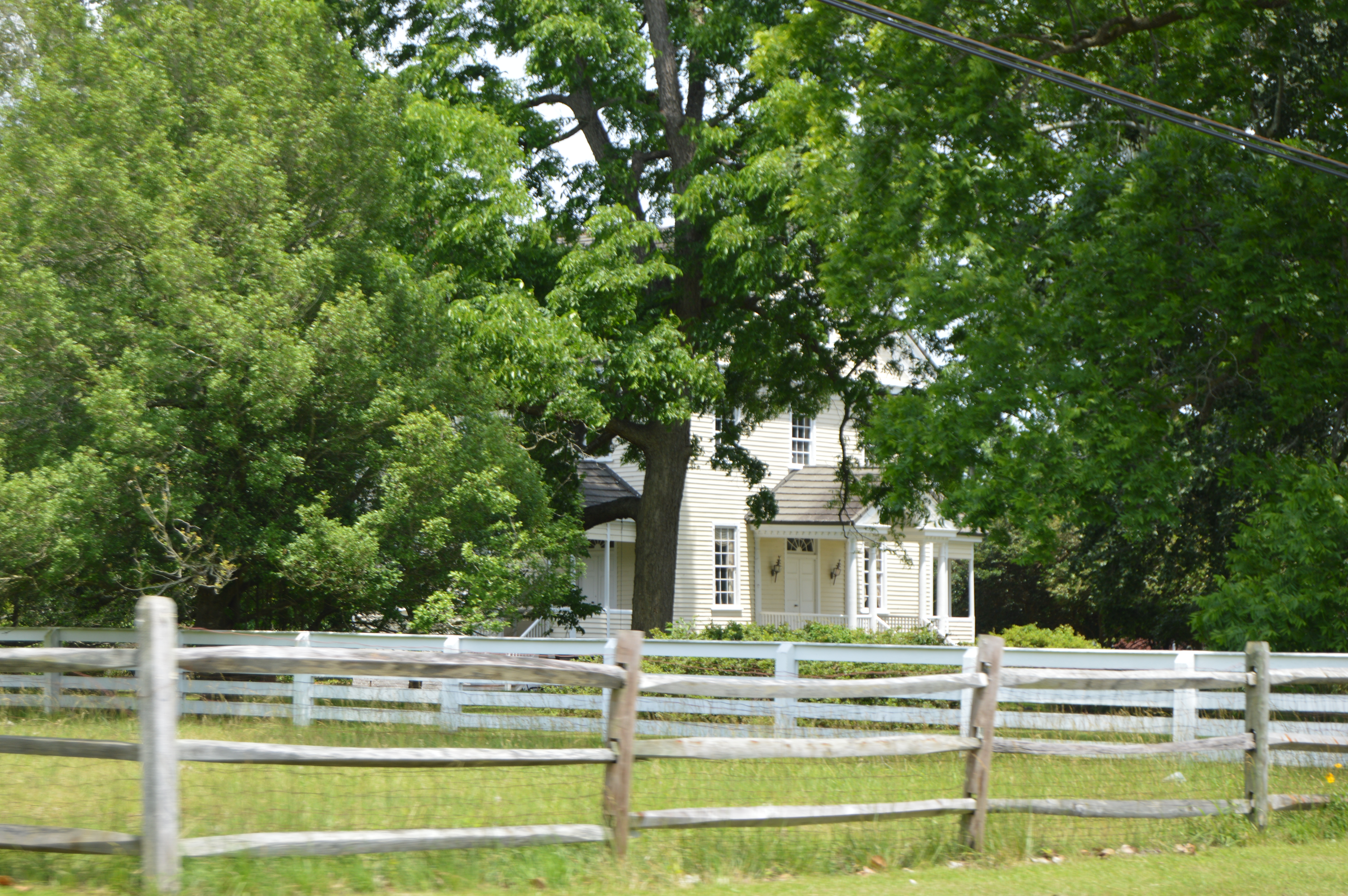
- Roadside view

- Location within North Carolina Location within the United States
- Location: S of South Mills off U.S. 17, near South Mills, North Carolina
- Coordinates: 36°24′47″N 76°20′2″W
- Area: 2.5 acres (1.0 ha)
- Built: 1826
- Built by: Holstead, Samuel
- Architectural style: Federal
- NRHP reference No.: 72000984
- Added to NRHP: February 1, 1972

Morgan House is a historic home located in Pasquotank County, North Carolina. It was built circa 1826 for Samuel Holstead, and is a two-story, three-bay, Federal style, temple-form frame dwelling. It sits on a brick pier foundation, with a three-part form-a central section flanked by porches. The front facade features a "dwarf portico" supported by two pairs of vernacular Doric order columns that carry an arched central bay.

It was listed on the National Register of Historic Places in 1972.
