= Old Trap, North Carolina =

- Unincorporated community
- Nicknames: Oldtrap, The Trap
- Interactive map of Old Trap, North Carolina
- Coordinates: 36°14′27″N 76°01′37″W
- Country: United States
- State: North Carolina
- County: Camden
- Elevation: 7 ft (2.1 m)
- Time zone: Eastern (EST)
- GNIS feature ID: 1002729

Old Trap (also known as Oldtrap and The Trap) is a rural community in Camden County, North Carolina, United States. It lies on North Carolina Highway 343, at an elevation of 7 feet (2.1 m) above sea level.

Old Trap was once called "The Trap" for the saloons the community contained which locals perceived as immoral.
