= Cornland School =

- U.S. National Register of Historic Places
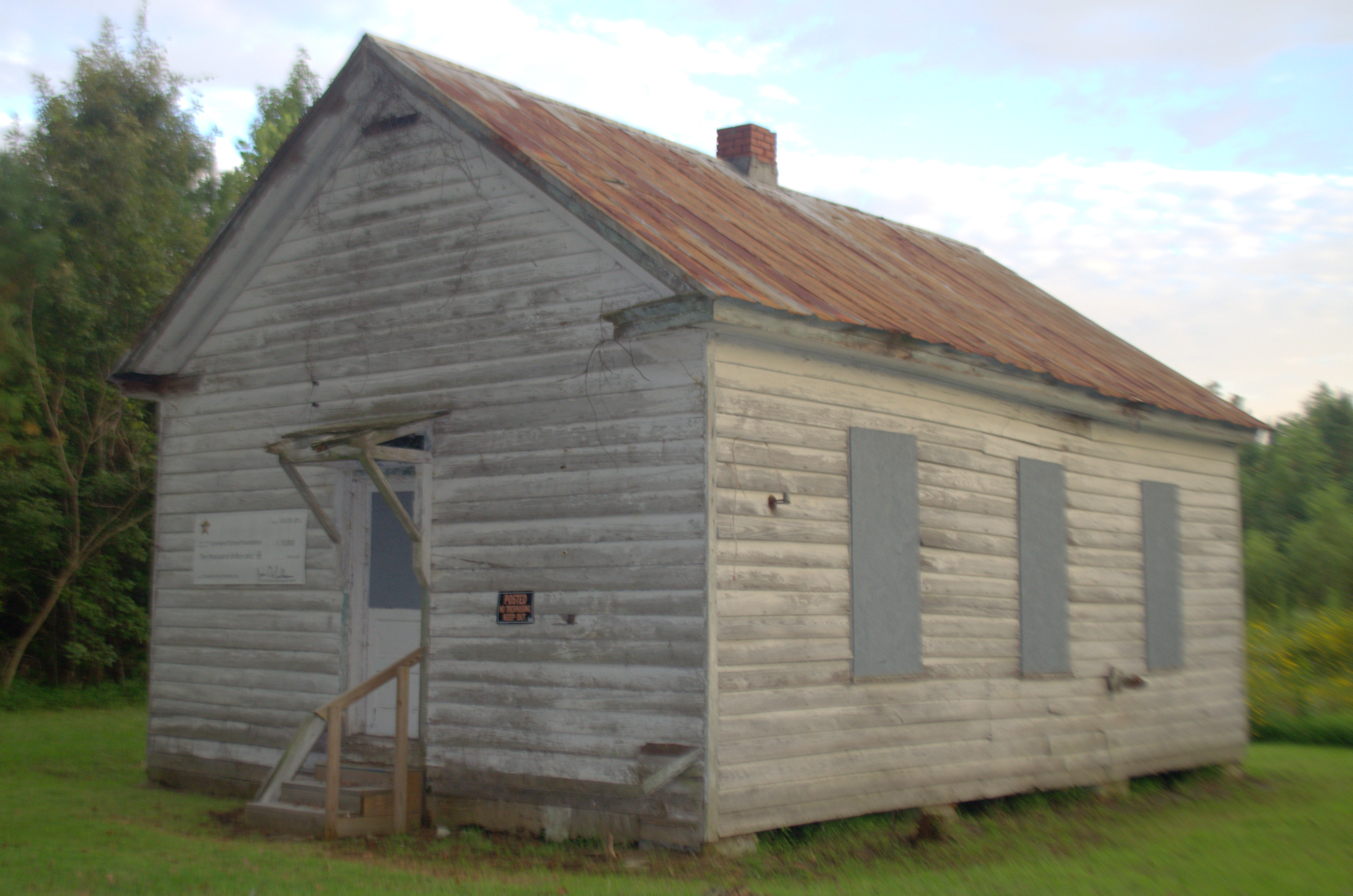

- Location within Virginia Location within the United States
- Location: 5221 Glencoe St., Chesapeake, Virginia 36°36′50″N 76°22′41″W
- Coordinates: 36°36′50″N 76°22′41″W
- NRHP reference No.: 15000546
- Added to NRHP: August 24, 2015

Cornland School is a one-room schoolhouse located in Chesapeake, Virginia. "It is believed to be the oldest pre-Rosenwald School still standing in Tidewater Virginia." It was listed on the National Register of Historic Places in 2015.

== History ==
The one-room building was built sometime around 1902. However, there is also evidence that the building existed circa 1885. Cornland was built with no electricity or indoor plumbing, and was heated by a wood-burning stove, which sat in the middle of the floor. The school represents one of the regions earliest attempts to educate African American children. The school was closed in 1952, when it was consolidated with other nearby schools. According to a supporter of the restoration project,

“While the present building dates to 1902, we know that there was an earlier school building close by. Records indicate that there were three schools for African-American children in the Pleasant Grove District of Norfolk County as early as 1871; Cornland’s predecessor is believed to be one. Local legend says freed slaves who treasured the opportunity to educate their children built it on land donated by Israel Foreman. By 1885, official documents begin recording the names of the teachers in the school. A restored Cornland School would honor the roots of African-American education while reminding us of how far we have come.”

In order to learn more about the school's history, Cornland School Foundation members are conducting interviews with former alumni, some of which are also actively involved in the school's preservation.

== Preservation ==
In 2010, Preservation Virginia listed Cornland School as one of its most endangered historic sites as it "is in serious disrepair." The City of Chesapeake is currently seeking to restore the building. The building itself has undergone smaller repairs such as the replacement of the front step. After the school was closed in 1952, it was used as a church and a residence. Some of the modifications needed for those structures still remain in the building.

=== Architecture ===
According to the Cornland School Foundation,

In the style of Vernacular architecture, "the structure is constructed of wood clapboard siding and a standing-seam metal roof. A small brick chimney protrudes from the center of the roofline. Windows are six-over-six, though the glass is continuous in each sash and not broken by the muntins. There are three windows on both the east and west facades. The remaining glazing has been covered with faux-stained glass plastic films. The windows have been boarded up to weatherproof the structure until stabilization and restoration are possible.”

== See also ==
- National Register of Historic Places listings in Chesapeake, Virginia
