= Oaklette Historic District =

Historic district in Virginia, United States

- U.S. National Register of Historic Places
- U.S. Historic district
- Virginia Landmarks Register
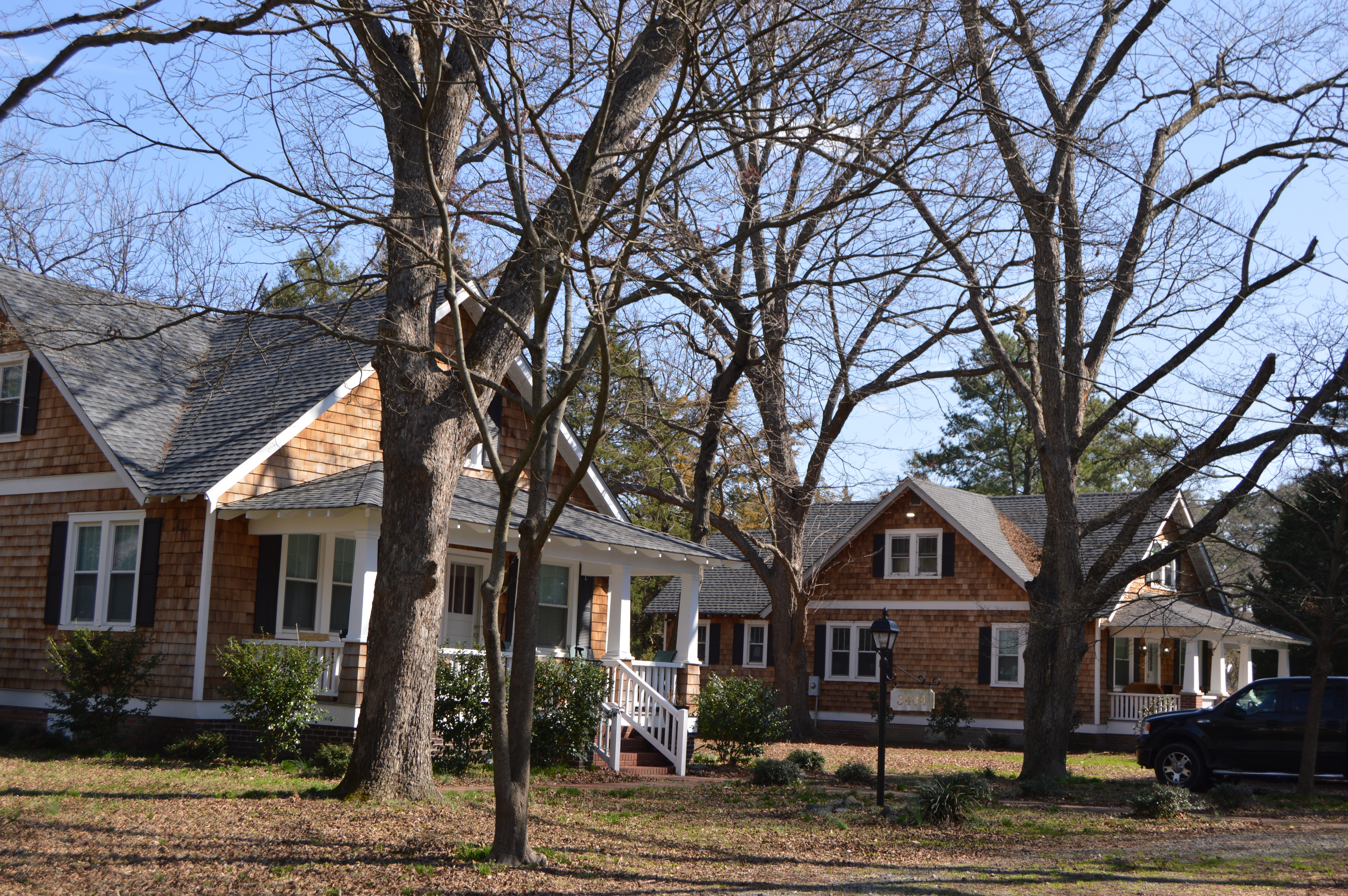
- Seneca Avenue

- Location within Virginia Location within the United States
- Location: Roughly bounded by Indian River Rd., Oaklette, Webster, St. Lawrence, & Seneca Sts., Chesapeake, Virginia
- Coordinates: 36°49′41″N 76°14′14″W
- Area: 75 acres (30 ha)
- Built: 1883
- Architect: Willoughby W. Colonna
- Architectural style: Colonial Revival, Bungalow/craftsman, et al.
- NRHP reference No.: 03000563
- VLR No.: 131-5073

Significant dates
- Added to NRHP: June 23, 2003
- Designated VLR: March 19, 2003

Oaklette Historic District is a national historic district located at Chesapeake, Virginia. The district encompasses 30 contributing buildings and 1 contributing object in an early-20th century planned streetcar suburb of Norfolk, Virginia. It is a primarily residential district that developed starting about World War I. The dwellings include representative examples of the Colonial Revival and Bungalow styles. Notable buildings include the Savage House (1915-1919), Pascal Paxson House (1901), George Wesley Jones House (1925), Samuel Paxson House (1906), Colonna Estate Caretaker's House (1925), and the Baker House (1910).

It was listed on the National Register of Historic Places in 2003.
