= North Carolina Highway 343 =

State highway in Camden County, North Carolina, US

North Carolina Highway 343

Route information
- Maintained by NCDOT
- Length: 25.5 mi (41.0 km)
- Existed: 1930–present

Major junctions
- South end: Wharf Road/Peatown Road/Texas Road in Old Trap
- US 158 in Camden
- North end: US 17 in South Mills

Location
- Country: United States
- State: North Carolina
- Counties: Camden

Highway system
- North Carolina Highway System; Interstate; US; State; Scenic
← US 321	→ NC 344

North Carolina Highway 343 (NC 343) is a primary state highway in the U.S. state of North Carolina. It serves to connect the county seat of Camden with both the north and south ends of Camden County.

== Route description ==
NC 343 begins at the intersection of Wharf Road (SR 1104) and Texas Road (SR 1100) in Old Trap. Going in an northwesterly direction and parallel to Pasquotank River to its west, it goes through the communities of Alder Branch, Shiloh and Taylors Beach. Passing through Camden, it links with U.S. Route 158 (US 158). Continuing northwesterly, it continues through the communities of Spences Corner, Lambs Corner, Burnt Mills and finally South Mills, where it joins US 17 Business (US 17 Bus.). Routed alongside the Dismal Swamp Canal, it ends at US 17 just north of South Mills.

The northern section, between Camden and South Mills, is frequently used in the summer months as an alternative route to and from the Outer Banks, from travelers from the Hampton Roads metro area of Virginia.

== Junction list ==
The entire route is in Camden County.

Location	mi	km	Destinations	Notes
Old Trap	0.0	0.0	Wharf Road / Texas Road	
Camden	11.6	18.7	US 158 – Nags Head, Manteo, Elizabeth City	
South Mills	23.9	38.5	US 17 Bus. – Elizabeth City	South end of US 17 Bus. overlap
	25.5	41.0	US 17 – Elizabeth City, Portsmouth	North end of US 17 Bus. overlap
1.000 mi = 1.609 km; 1.000 km = 0.621 mi

== See also ==
- North Carolina Bicycle Route 4 - Concurrent with NC 343 from US 158 to Scotland Road in Camden
