= North Carolina game land =

Hunting and fishing reserve

North Carolina game lands are areas of public and private protected land comprising some 2,000,000 acres (8,000 km^{2}) in North Carolina managed by the North Carolina Wildlife Resources Commission for public hunting, trapping, and inland fishing. Wildlife Law Enforcement Officers enforce state and federal game, fish, and boating laws.

== List of game lands ==
The game lands are divided into three regions.

== Mountain Region ==
- Buffalo Cove: A 4,800 acres (1,900 ha) wildlife preserve.
- Cold Mountain game land: 25,711 acres (10,405 ha) located in Haywood County. Over 50 species of salamanders are within the mountain, including the species of special concern Eastern Hellbender (Cryptobranchus a. alleganiensis) in Cold Mountain.
- DuPont State Forest: 12,500 acres (5,100 ha) located in Henderson and Transylvania counties.
- Elk Knob
- Green River
- Headwaters State Forest
- Johns River
- Kerr Scott
- Kings Creek Game Land
- Little Fork State Forest
- Mitchell River
- Needmore
- North Bend Game Land
- Pisgah WRC
- Pond Mountain
- Sandy Mush
- South Mountains
- Three Top Mountain
- Thurmond Chatham
- Toxaway
- William H. Silver
- Nantahala National Forest
- Pisgah National Forest

== Piedmont Region ==
- Brinkleyville
- Buckhorn
- Butner-Falls of Neuse
- Chatham
- Dan River
- Embro
- Harris
- Hill Farm
- Hyco
- Jordan
- Lee
- Linwood
- Lower Fishing Creek
- Mayo
- Nicholson Creek
- Pee Dee River
- Perkins
- R. Wayne Bailey – Caswell
- Rockﬁsh Creek
- Sandhills
- Sandy Creek
- Second Creek
- Shocco Creek
- Tar River
- Tillery
- Upper Roanoke River
- Vance
- Yadkin River
- Uwharrie National Forest

== Coastal Region ==
- Alligator River
- Angola Bay
- Bachelor Bay
- Bertie County
- Bladen Lakes State Forest
- Buckridge
- Bullard and Branch Hunting Preserve
- Buxton Woods
- Cape Fear River Wetlands
- Carteret County
- Chowan
- Chowan Swamp
- Columbus County
- Currituck Banks & Currituck NWR
- Dare
- Dover Bay
- Goose Creek
- Green Swamp
- Gull Rock
- Holly Shelter
- J. Morgan Futch
- Lantern Acres
- Light Ground Pocosin
- Lower Roanoke River and Roanoke River NWR
- Neuse River
- New Lake
- North River
- Northwest River Marsh
- Pungo River
- Rhodes Pond
- Roanoke Island Marshes
- Robeson
- Rocky Run (Permit)
- Sampson
- Stones Creek
- Suggs Mill Pond
- Sutton Lake
- Texas Plantation
- Van Swamp
- Voice of America
- White Oak River
- Whitehall Plantation
- Croatan National Forest

== See also ==
- List of North Carolina state parks
- List of North Carolina state forests
- List of North Carolina state parks
