= South Norfolk Historic District =

Historic district in Virginia, United States

- U.S. National Register of Historic Places
- U.S. Historic district
- Virginia Landmarks Register
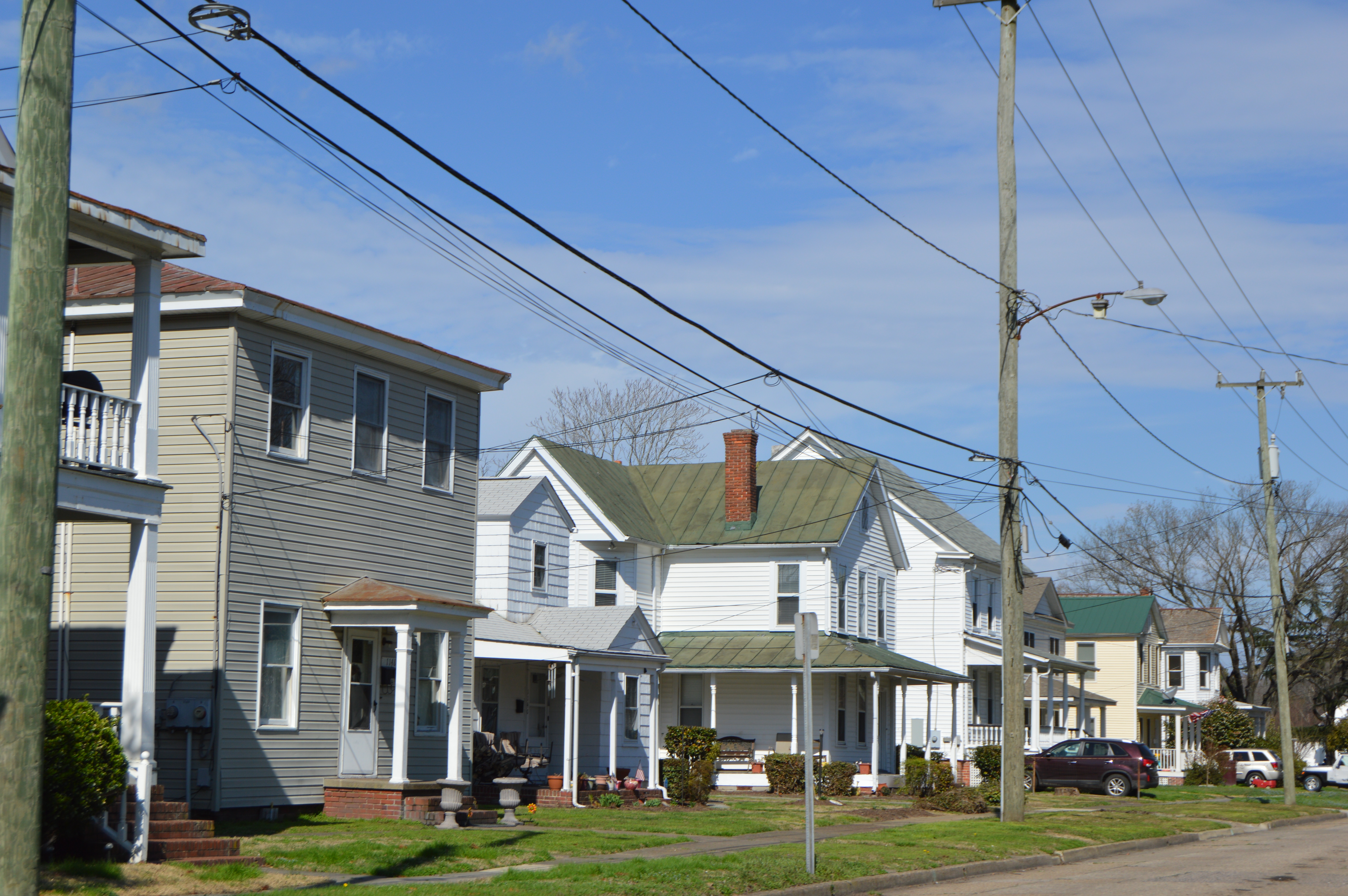
- Stewart Street

- Location within Virginia Location within the United States
- Location: Roughly bounded by Hull St., Poindexter, D St., 16th St., B St., Seaboard Ave., Richmond Ave., and Byrd Ave., Chesapeake, Virginia
- Coordinates: 36°48′55″N 76°16′29″W
- Area: 480 acres (190 ha)
- Architectural style: Colonial Revival, Stick/eastlake, Queen Anne
- NRHP reference No.: 88003133
- VLR No.: 131-0055

Significant dates
- Added to NRHP: January 27, 1989
- Designated VLR: December 8, 1987

South Norfolk Historic District is a national historic district located at Chesapeake, Virginia. The district encompasses 668 contributing buildings and 1 contributing site in what started as a planned community of Norfolk County, Virginia and grew to become an independent city. South Norfolk was never part of Norfolk, Virginia. In fact, the two cities are separated by the Eastern Branch of the Elizabeth River. South Norfolk is a primarily residential district that was developed between 1890 and 1930. The dwellings include representative examples of the Colonial Revival, Stick Style, and Queen Anne styles. The district also includes several churches, a school, a park, and a small local business district.

It was listed on the National Register of Historic Places in 1989.
