= Old Portlock School No. 5 =

- U.S. National Register of Historic Places
- Virginia Landmarks Register
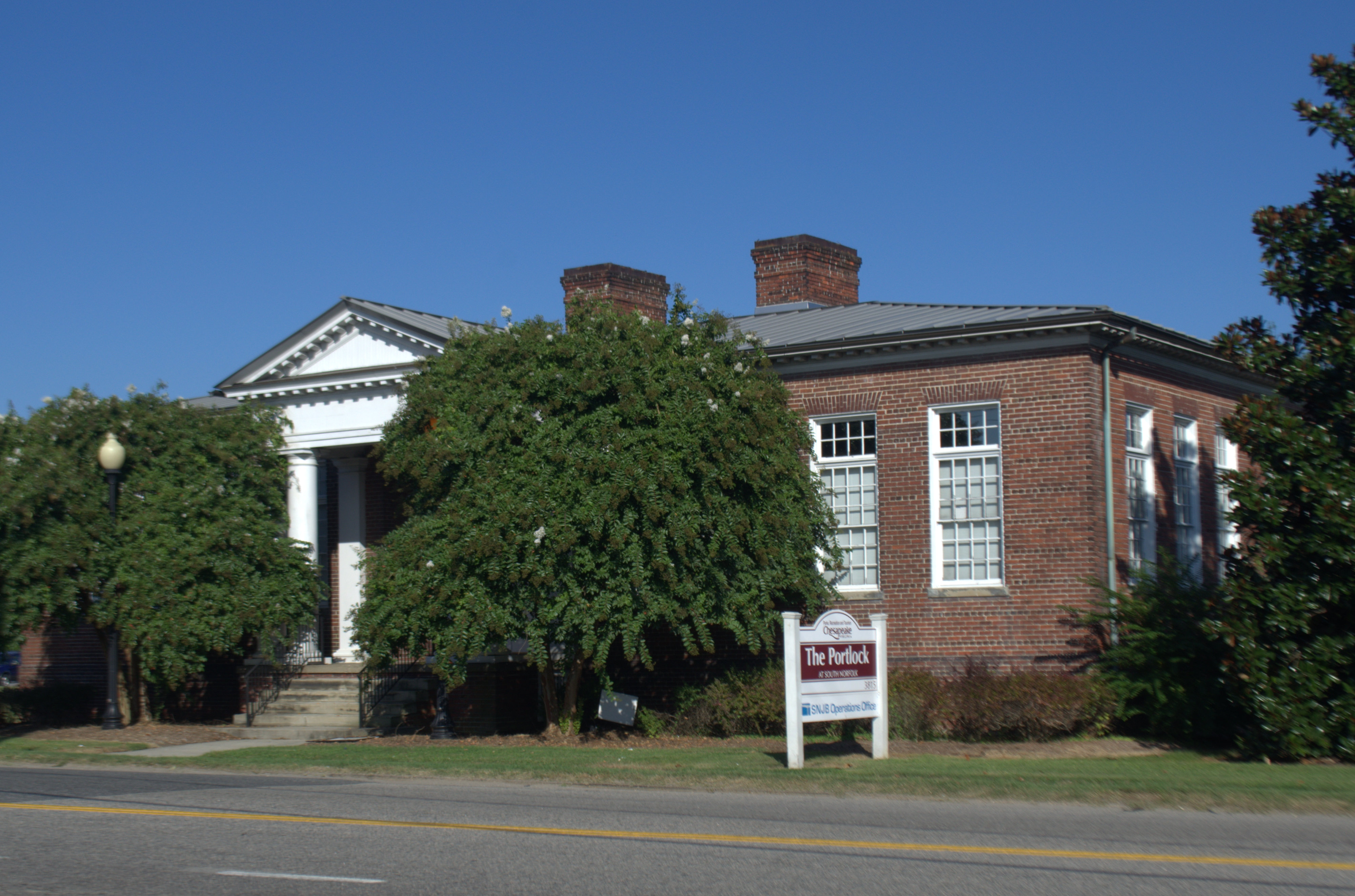

- Location within Virginia Location within the United States
- Location: 3815 Bainbridge Blvd., Chesapeake, Virginia
- Coordinates: 36°47′14″N 76°16′54″W
- Area: 0.5 acres (0.20 ha)
- Built: 1908
- Architect: Ferguson, Finlay Forbes; Calrow, Charles J.
- Architectural style: Colonial Revival
- NRHP reference No.: 00000066
- VLR No.: 131-0626

Significant dates
- Added to NRHP: February 4, 2000
- Designated VLR: December 1, 1999

Old Portlock School No. 5 is a historic school building located at Chesapeake, Virginia. It was built in 1908, and is a one-story, rectangular, Colonial Revival style brick building. It features a hipped roof and a classical temple fronted porch with frieze, pediment, cornice, columns and pilasters. It continued to serve as an educational facility until the mid-1960s.

It was listed on the National Register of Historic Places in 2000.
