= Sunray Agricultural Historic District =

Historic district in Virginia, United States

- U.S. National Register of Historic Places
- U.S. Historic district
- Virginia Landmarks Register
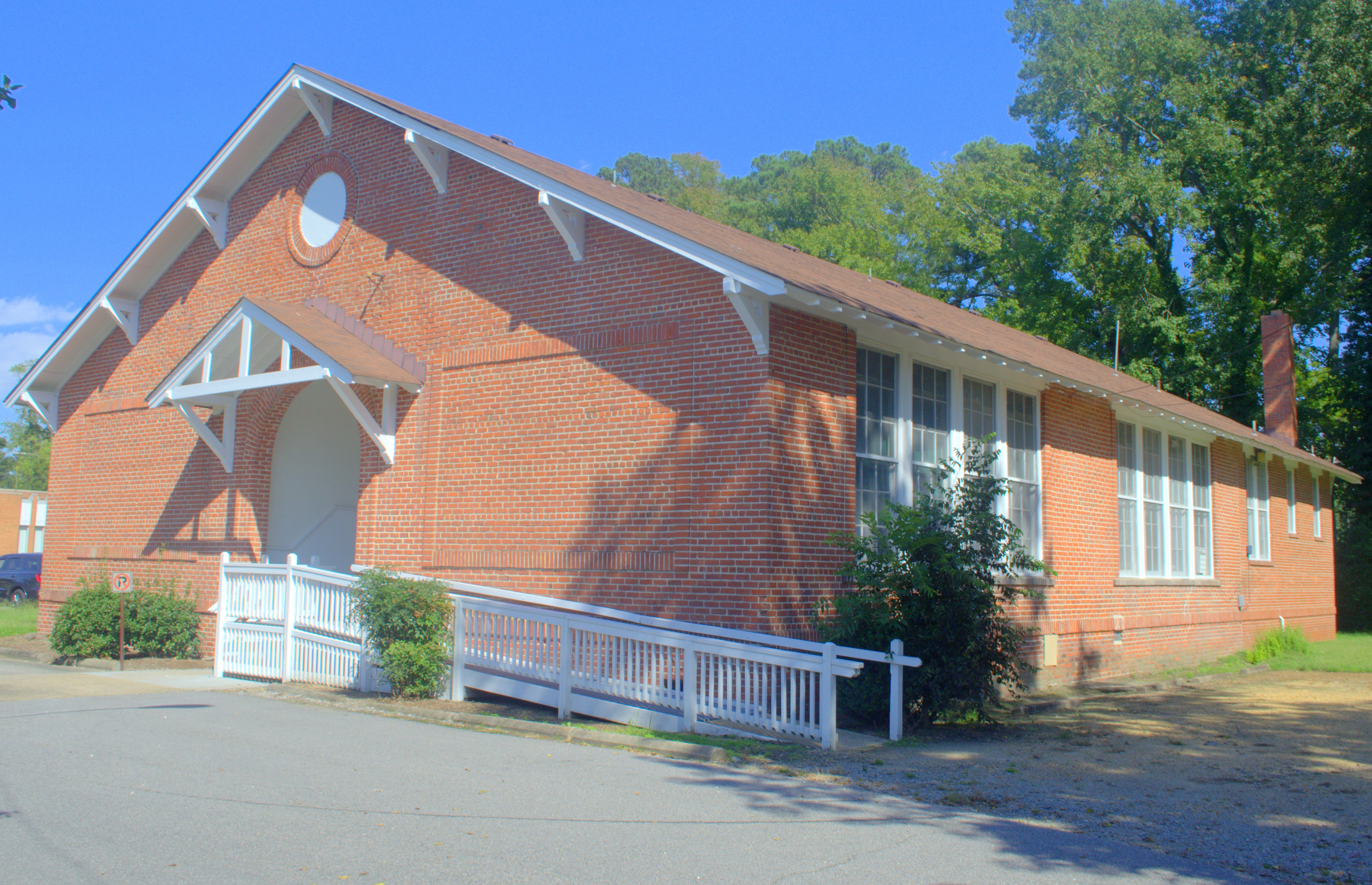
- Sunray School (1922)

- Location within Virginia Location within the United States
- Location: Roughly bounded by Great Dismal Swamp & I 64, Chesapeake, Virginia
- Coordinates: 36°46′51″N 76°24′40″W
- Area: 1,264 acres (512 ha)
- Built: 1908
- Architect: Pavlovetz, Michale; Virginia State Board of Education
- Architectural style: Colonial Revival, Bungalow/craftsman, et al.
- NRHP reference No.: 03000564
- VLR No.: 131-5325

Significant dates
- Added to NRHP: May 29, 2007
- Designated VLR: March 19, 2003

Sunray Agricultural Historic District is a national historic district located at Chesapeake, Virginia. The district encompasses 188 contributing buildings, 90 contributing sites, 2 contributing structures, and 1 contributing object in the early 20th-century immigrant farming community of Sunray. It includes early 20th century vernacular farmhouses, agricultural buildings, Sunray School (1922), and St. Mary's Catholic Church (1915-1916). The district also includes a tidal ditch system, the abandoned Virginian Railway Tracks (1909), and agricultural fields laid out with the platting of 1908.

== History ==
It was listed on the National Register of Historic Places in 2007. In 1908, the first long term farming community of Polish Americans was Sunray. Sunray is located in Chesapeake, Virginia, which was Norfolk County at the time. The Piast colony was the original name, commemorating the Piast Dynasty, Poland's first royal family, but it was renamed Sunray after the name of the 1910 station on the Virginian Railway in the town. Many Polish immigrants worked in factories and mines on the East Coast of the United States.

The Southern Homestead Corporation, incorporated in Norfolk in 1907, encouraged the immigrants to move to this farming community by platting the land to individual farm and house plots. The land was a swamp and the farmers purchasing the land had to clear trees and dig stumps out of the wetlands. They had to set up tidal drainage ditches to drain the wetland. The ditches would always have to be maintained for continued farming. The farms let them invest and grow their money from the factories into productive farms. Sophia Barnack's store was a place where community members could gather, it had beer and sodas at a table and Polish American Polka music along with Country music. They continued to welcome Polish Americans through the 1950s.

== Gallery ==
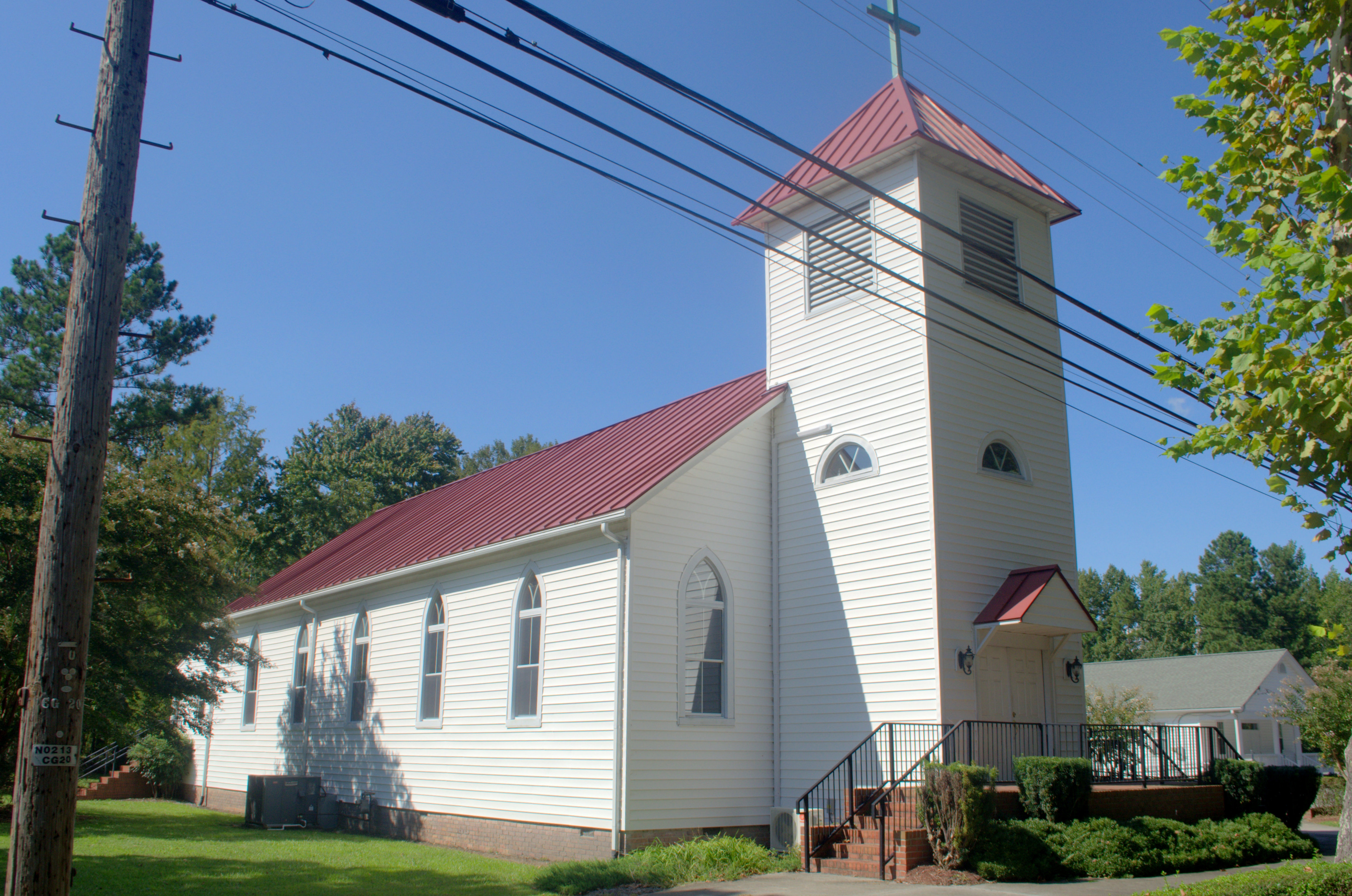
St Mary's 1915 Church at Sunray

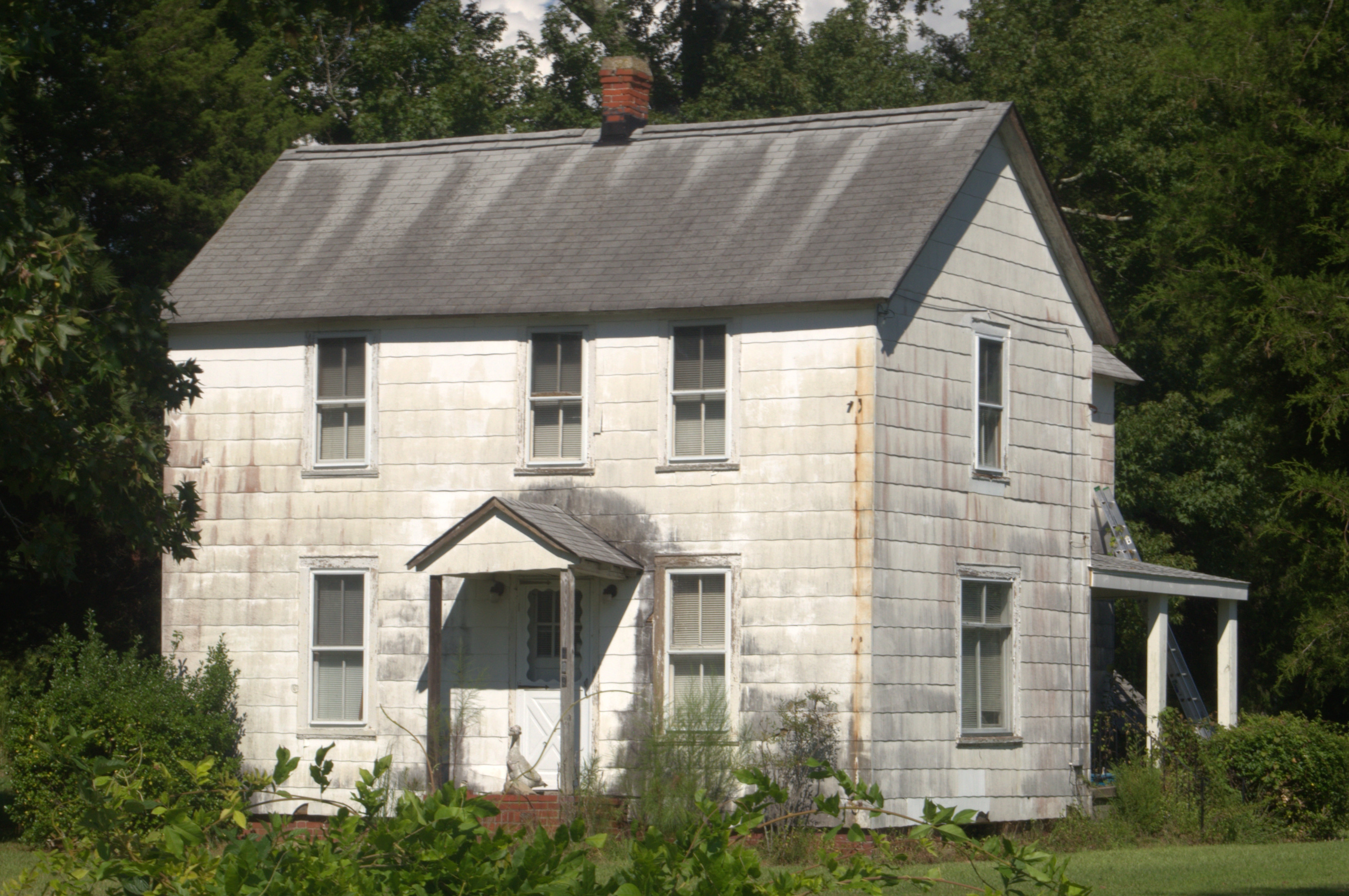
Colonial Revival House at 429 Biernot Road

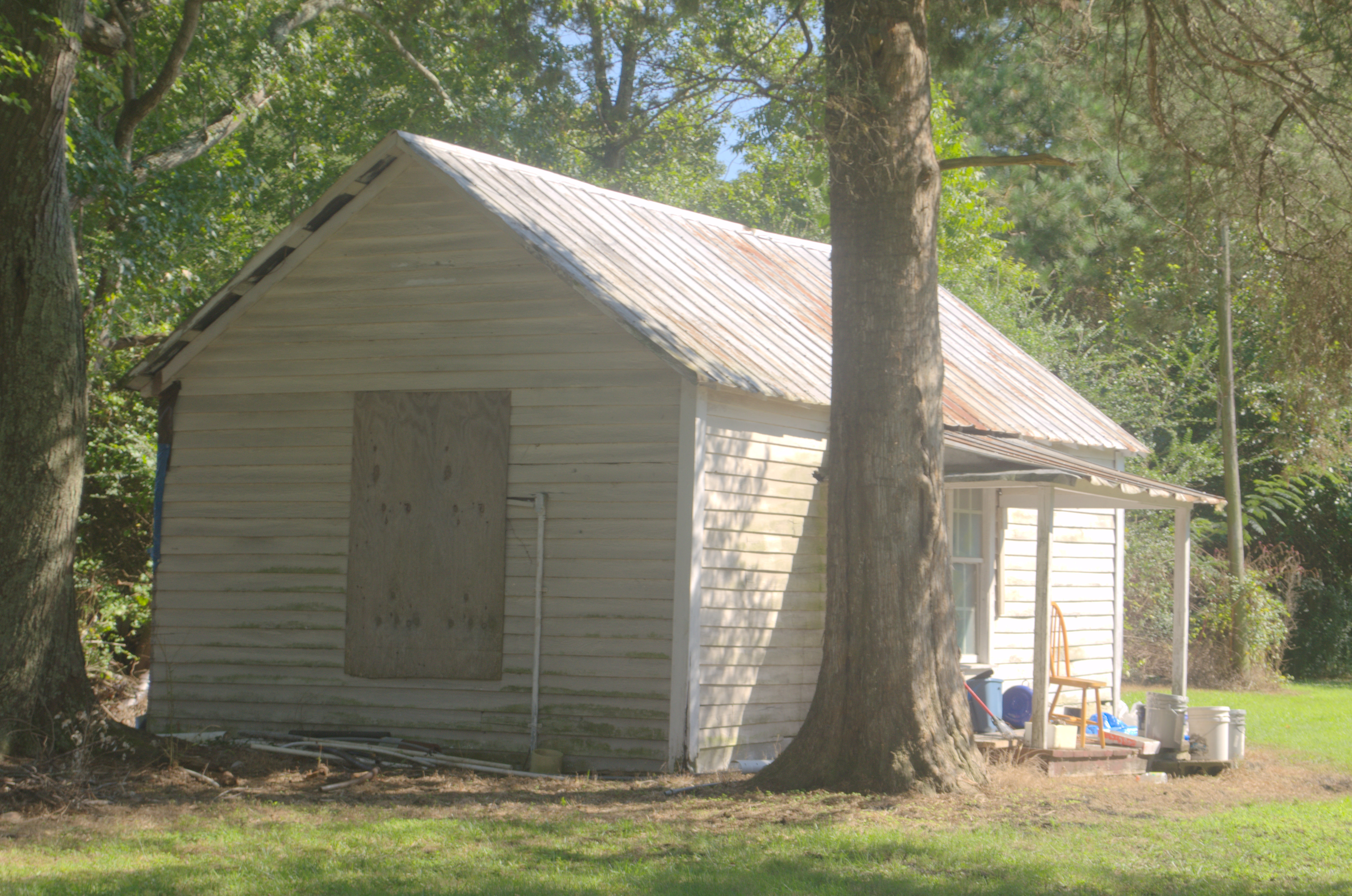
Kitchen at 4333 East Road
