= Centreville–Fentress Historic District =

Historic district in Virginia, United States

- U.S. National Register of Historic Places
- U.S. Historic district
- Virginia Landmarks Register
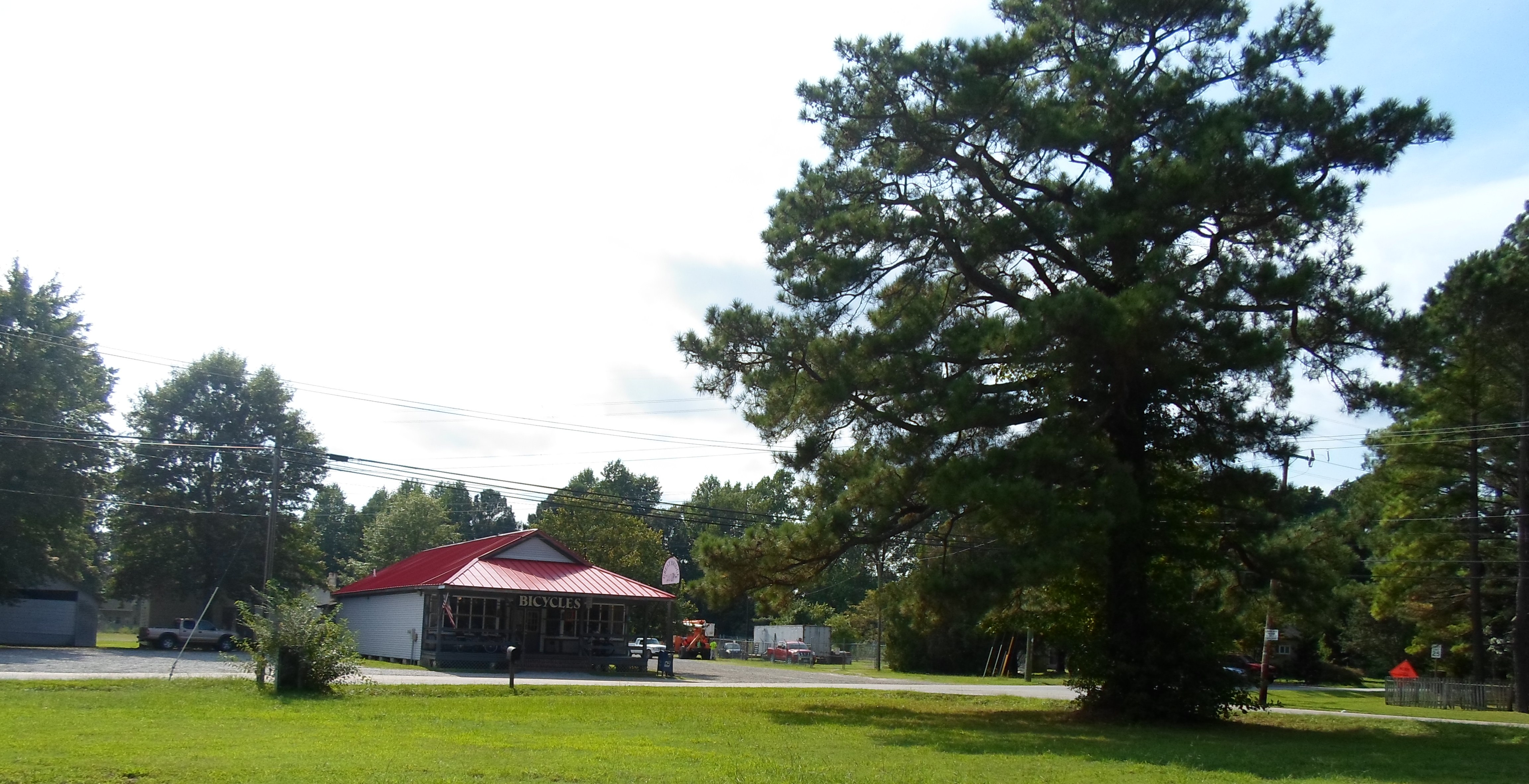
- The corner of Fentress Road and Blue Ridge Road

- Location within Virginia Location within the United States
- Location: Roughly bounded by Fentress Rd., Centerville Tnpk., Blue Ridge Rd., Whittamore Rd., Chesapeake, Virginia
- Coordinates: 36°41′54″N 76°10′44″W
- Area: 257 acres (104 ha)
- Built: 1871
- Architect: King, John S.
- Architectural style: Colonial Revival, Queen Anne, et al.
- NRHP reference No.: 03000562
- VLR No.: 131-5071

Significant dates
- Added to NRHP: June 23, 2003
- Designated VLR: March 19, 2003

Centreville–Fentress Historic District is a national historic district located at Chesapeake, Virginia. The district encompasses 24 contributing buildings and 10 contributing structures in a rural farming community that developed a small commercial core. It was developed starting in the 1880s, with the addition of the Norfolk and Elizabeth City Railroad link to the Albemarle and Chesapeake Canal. Notable resources include the Fentress House (c. 1870s), Colonial Revival style Centerville Baptist Church (1925), New Burfoot House (1925), Queen Anne style George Jackson House (1890), the Norfolk and Elizabeth City, NC Railroad Tracks, and a 1920 commercial building.

It was listed on the National Register of Historic Places in 2003.
