= Camden County Courthouse (North Carolina) =

Historic courthouse in North Carolina, US

- U.S. National Register of Historic Places
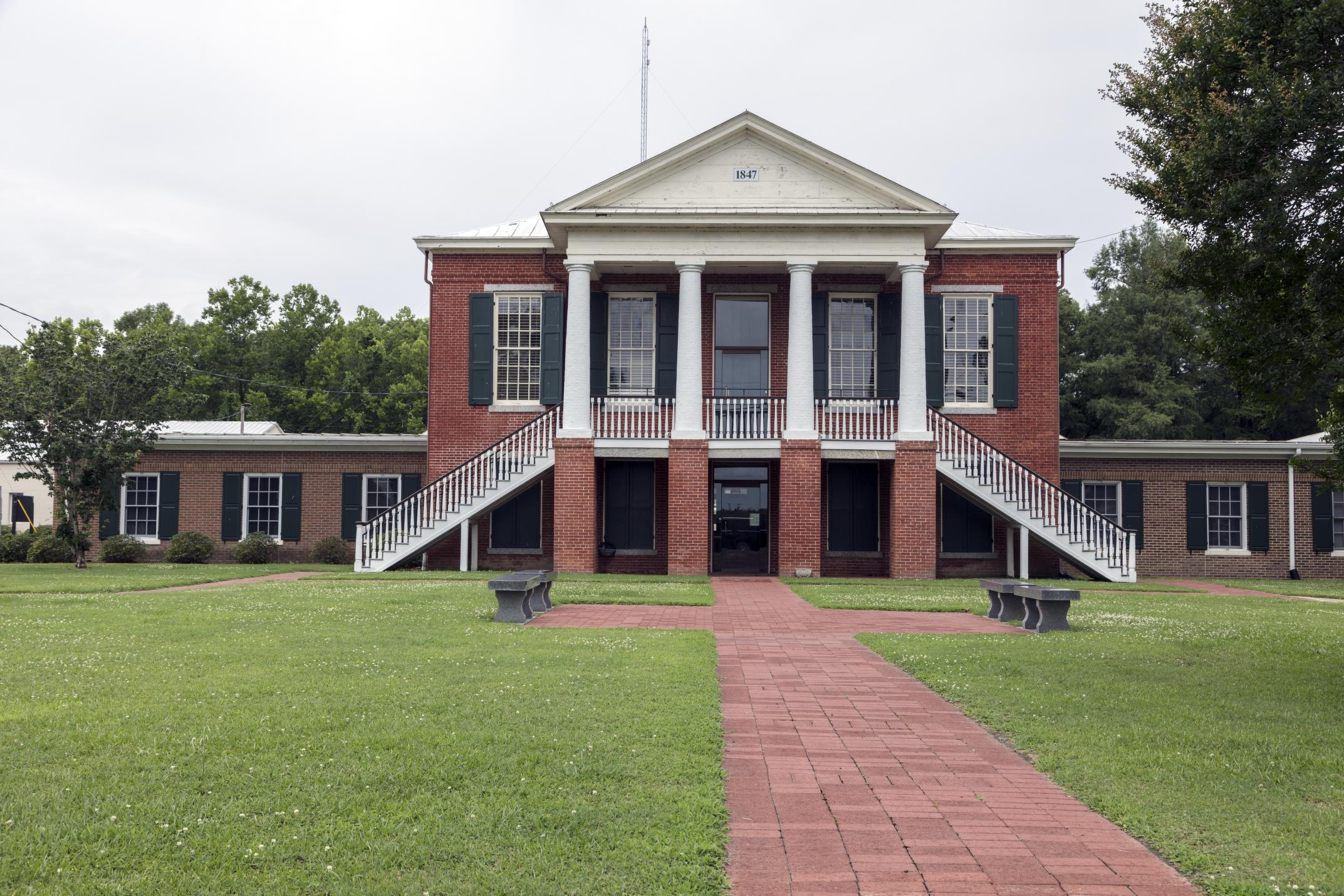
- Front of the courthouse

- Location within North Carolina Location within the United States
- Location: 117 NC 343, Camden, North Carolina
- Coordinates: 36.3296°N 76.1747°W
- Built: 1847
- Architectural style: Greek Revival
- NRHP reference No.: 72000928
- Added to NRHP: February 1, 1972

Camden County Courthouse is a historic county courthouse in Camden, an unincorporated area in Camden County, North Carolina, USA. The courthouse was built in 1847; it is a single-storey brick building in the Greek Revival style. It features a pedimented porch and large windows.

It was listed on the National Register of Historic Places in 1972.
