= South Mills, North Carolina =

- Census-designated place
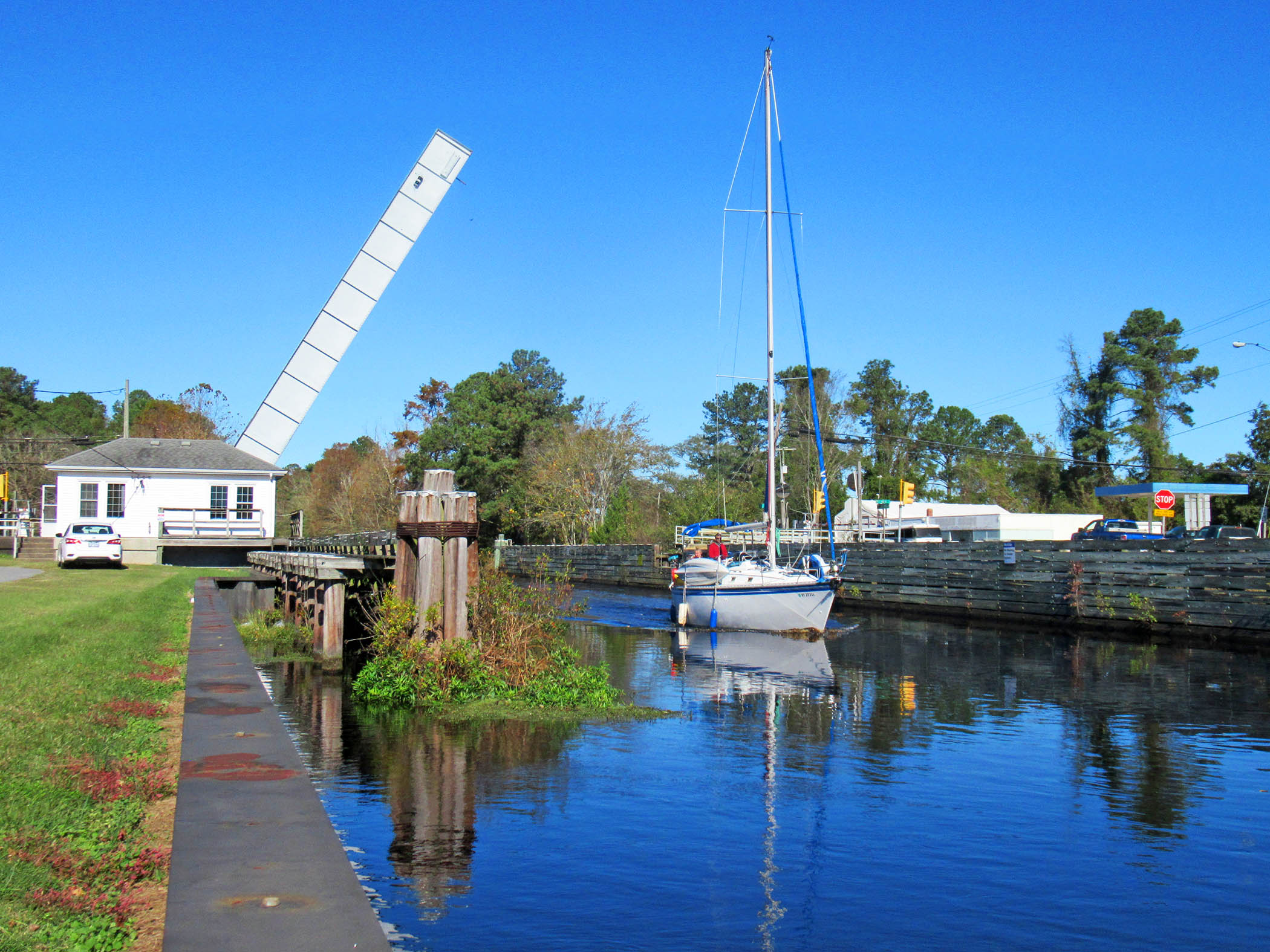
- Highway bridge open for passage of sailboat at South Mills on the Intracoastal Waterway (Dismal Swamp Canal)

- Location in Camden County and the state of North Carolina.
- Coordinates: 36°26′16″N 76°19′51″W
- Country: United States
- State: North Carolina
- County: Camden

Area
  - Total: 1.79 sq mi (4.64 km^{2})
  - Land: 1.79 sq mi (4.64 km^{2})
  - Water: 0 sq mi (0.00 km^{2})
- Elevation: 3 ft (0.91 m)

Population (2020)
  - Total: 362
  - Density: 202.1/sq mi (78.05/km^{2})
- Time zone: UTC-5 (Eastern (EST))
  - Summer (DST): UTC-4 (EDT)
- ZIP code: 27976
- Area code: 252
- GNIS feature ID: 2628656
- FIPS code: 37-63340

South Mills is an unincorporated community and census-designated place (CDP) in Camden County, North Carolina, United States. As of the 2020 census, South Mills had a population of 362. South Mills has a post office with ZIP code 27976, which opened on March 2, 1840. The community is located near U.S. Route 17, and U.S. Route 17 Business and North Carolina Highway 343, and future Interstate 87 (North Carolina) pass through the community.

The community derived its name from a watermill which operated near the original town site.

The William Riley Abbott House, Dismal Swamp Canal, and Morgan House are listed on the National Register of Historic Places.

== Demographics ==
Historical population
Census	Pop.	Note	%±
2020	362		—
U.S. Decennial Census

=== 2020 census ===
South Mills racial composition
Race	Number	Percentage
White (non-Hispanic)	281	77.62%
Black or African American (non-Hispanic)	50	13.81%
Asian	2	0.55%
Other/Mixed	25	6.91%
Hispanic or Latino	4	1.1%

As of the 2020 United States census, there were 362 people, 181 households, and 139 families residing in the CDP.
