= Camden, North Carolina =

- Census-designated place
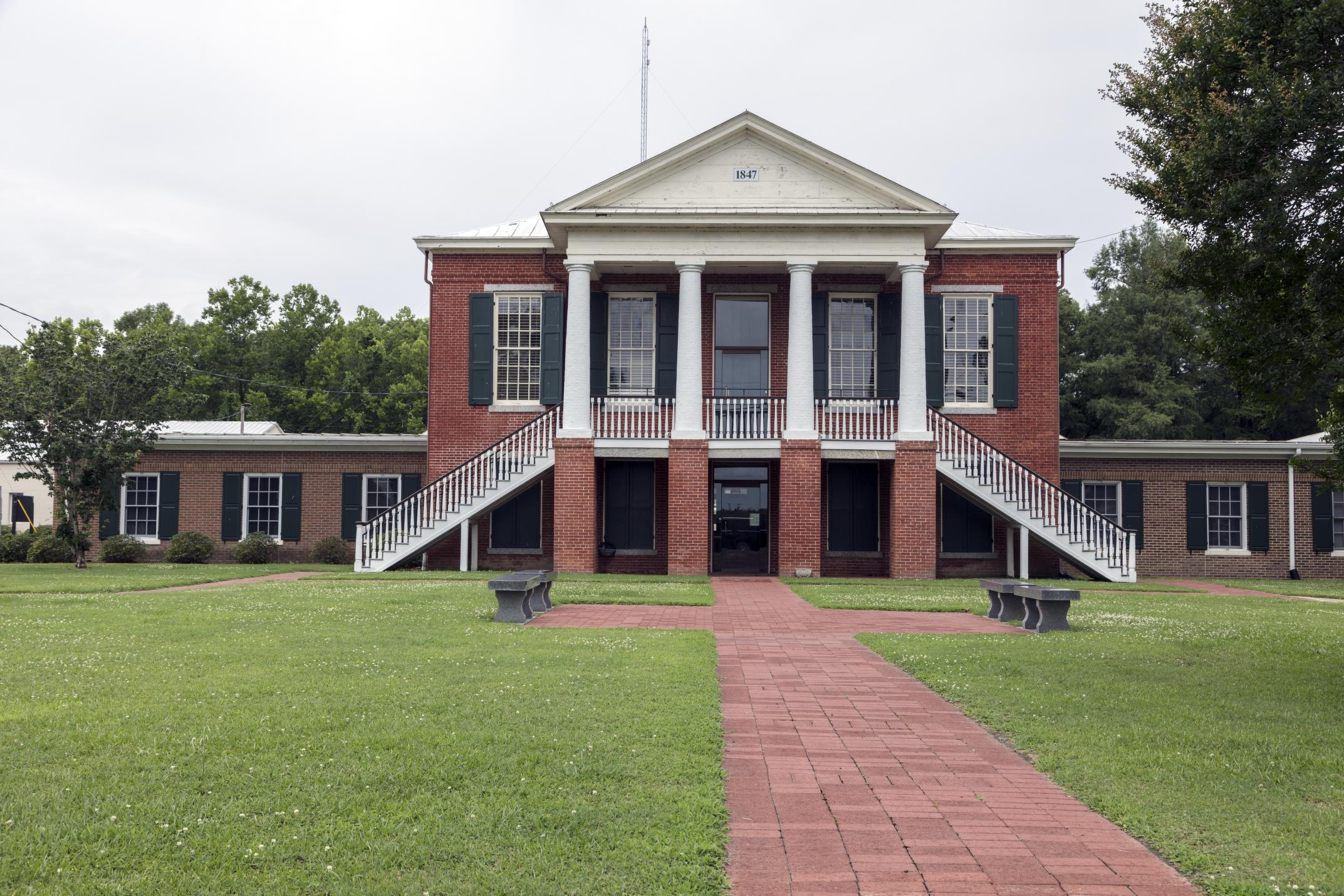
- Camden County Courthouse

- Location within Camden County and the state of North Carolina
- Coordinates: 36°19′30″N 76°10′12″W
- Country: United States
- State: North Carolina
- County: Camden

Area
  - Total: 1.59 sq mi (4.11 km^{2})
  - Land: 1.58 sq mi (4.09 km^{2})
  - Water: 0.0077 sq mi (0.02 km^{2})
- Elevation: 7 ft (2.1 m)

Population (2020)
  - Total: 620
  - Density: 392.7/sq mi (151.62/km^{2})
- Time zone: UTC-5 (Eastern (EST))
  - Summer (DST): UTC-4 (EDT)
- ZIP code: 27921, 27929
- Area code: 252
- GNIS feature ID: 2585495
- FIPS code: 37-09780

Camden is an unincorporated community and census-designated place in Camden County, North Carolina, United States. It is the county seat of Camden County, a consolidated city-county. At the 2020 census, the population was 620.

Camden is located on the eastern banks of the Pasquotank River, across from which lies Elizabeth City. It currently has two traffic lights, and is centered at the intersection of U.S. Highway 158 and North Carolina Highway 343. It has five schools: Grandy Primary School, Camden Intermediate School, Camden Middle School, Camden County High, and Camtech Early College High School.

Camden is part of the Elizabeth City, NC Micropolitan Statistical Area.

The Camden County Courthouse, Camden County Jail, Lamb-Ferebee House, and Milford are listed on the National Register of Historic Places.

== Demographics ==
Historical population
Census	Pop.	Note	%±
2020	620		—
U.S. Decennial Census

=== 2020 census ===
Camden racial composition
Race	Number	Percentage
White (non-Hispanic)	484	78.06%
Black or African American (non-Hispanic)	72	11.61%
Native American	3	0.48%
Asian	11	1.77%
Other/Mixed	32	5.16%
Hispanic or Latino	18	2.9%

As of the 2020 United States census, there were 620 people, 274 households, and 206 families residing in the town.
