= Camden County, North Carolina =

Consolidated city-county in North Carolina, United States

- Consolidated city-county
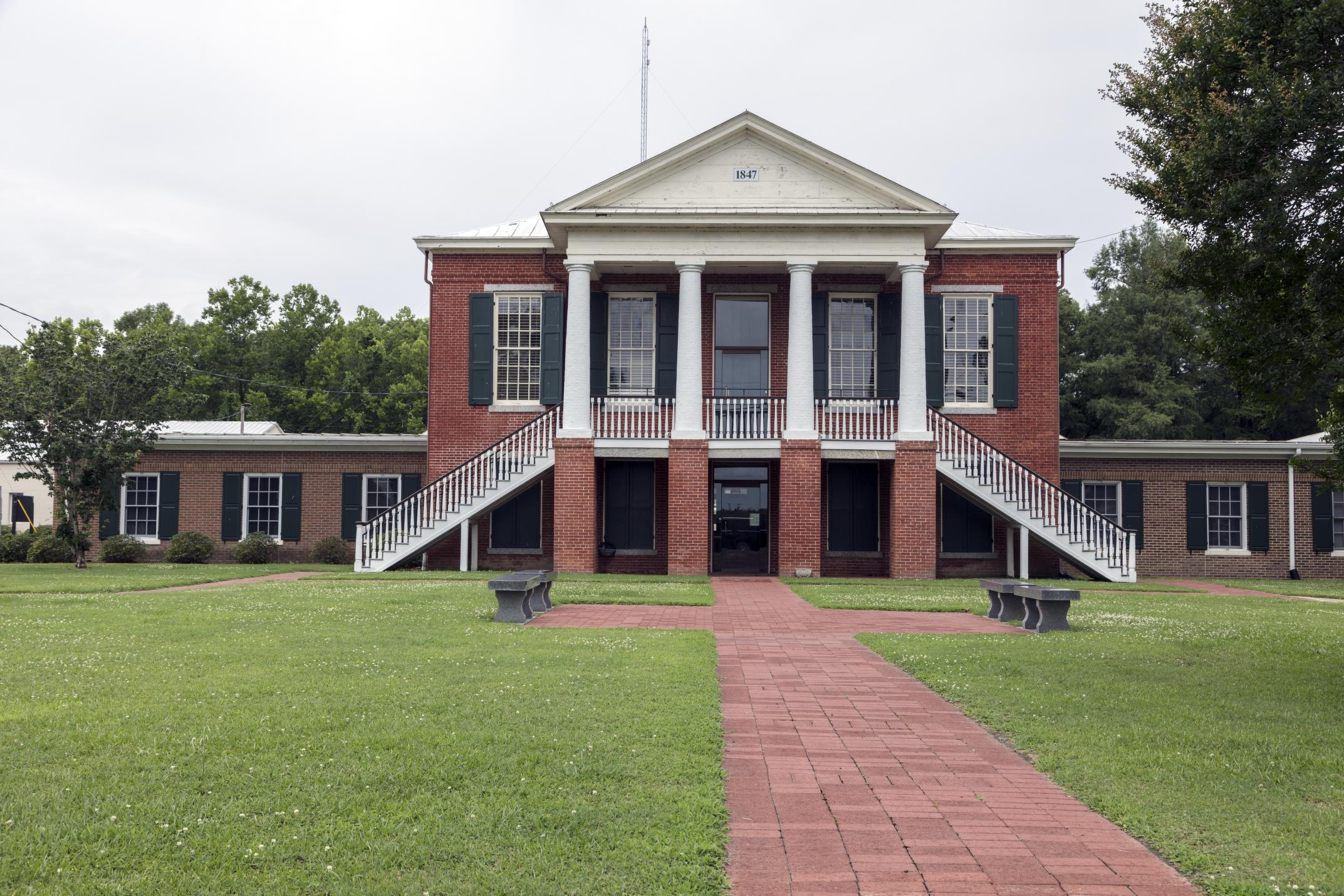
- Camden County Courthouse

- Flag Seal Logo
- Motto: "Boundless Opportunities."
- Location within the U.S. state of North Carolina
- Interactive map of Camden County, North Carolina
- Coordinates: 36.34°N 76.16°W
- Country: United States
- State: North Carolina
- Founded: 1777 (Consolidated July 1, 2006)
- Named for: Charles Pratt, 1st Earl Camden
- Seat: Camden
- Largest community: Camden

Area
  - Total: 310.26 sq mi (803.6 km^{2})
  - Land: 240.33 sq mi (622.5 km^{2})
  - Water: 69.93 sq mi (181.1 km^{2}) 22.54%

Population (2020)
  - Total: 10,355
  - Estimate (2025): 11,315 ▲
  - Density: 43/sq mi (17/km^{2})
- Time zone: UTC−5 (Eastern)
  - Summer (DST): UTC−4 (EDT)
- Congressional district: 1st
- Website: www.camdencountync.gov

Camden County is a consolidated city-county located in the U.S. state of North Carolina. As of the 2020 census, the population was 10,355, making it the fourth-least populous county in North Carolina. Its county seat is Camden. Camden County is included in the Virginia Beach-Chesapeake, VA-NC Combined Statistical Area.

== History ==
The county was formed in 1777 from part of Pasquotank County. It was named for Charles Pratt, 1st Lord Camden, a British politician who had opposed the Stamp Act and was sympathetic towards American colonists. The county is the site of the southern terminus of the Dismal Swamp Canal. The first county courthouse was constructed in 1782 and was replaced in 1847. It was the site of the Battle of South Mills in April 1862, during the American Civil War.

Shiloh Baptist Church, founded around 1727 by Paul Palmer, is the oldest Baptist church in North Carolina. It is located in the Shiloh township.

Though technically there are no incorporated municipalities in Camden County (with the exception of a small portion of Elizabeth City; most of which is in bordering Pasquotank County), the county became the first consolidated city-county entity in North Carolina on July 1, 2006.

== Geography ==
Camden County, NC

Climate chart (precipitation, max. and min. temperature)
J	F	M	A	M	J	J	A	S	O	N	D
3.7 51 31	3.4 54 33	3.9 61 39	3.5 71 47	3.9 78 56	4.4 86 66	5.5 89 70	5.5 87 68	5 82 63	3.5 73 51	3.3 64 43	3.6 54 34
- █ Average max. and min. temperatures in °F
- █ Precipitation totals in inches
Metric conversion
J	F	M	A	M	J	J	A	S	O	N	D
94 10 −1	86 12 1	99 16 4	89 21 9	99 26 14	112 30 19	140 32 21	140 30 20	127 28 17	89 23 11	84 18 6	91 12 1
- █ Average max. and min. temperatures in °C
- █ Precipitation totals in mm

According to the U.S. Census Bureau, the county has a total area of 310.26 square miles (803.6 km^{2}), of which 240.33 square miles (622.5 km^{2}) is land and 69.93 square miles (181.1 km^{2}) (22.54%) is water.

=== National protected area ===
- Great Dismal Swamp National Wildlife Refuge (part)

=== State and local protected areas ===
- Dismal Swamp State Park
- North River Game Land (part)

=== Major water bodies ===
- Albemarle Sound
- Intracoastal Waterway
- North River
- Pasquotank River

=== Adjacent counties ===
- City of Suffolk, Virginia – north
- City of Chesapeake, Virginia – north
- Currituck County – east
- Tyrrell County – south
- Pasquotank County – southwest
- Gates County – northwest

=== Major highways ===
- Future I-87
- US 17
- US 17 Bus.
- US 158
- NC 34
- NC 343

== Demographics ==
Historical population
Census	Pop.	Note	%±
1790	4,022		—
1800	4,191		4.2%
1810	5,347		27.6%
1820	6,347		18.7%
1830	6,733		6.1%
1840	5,663		−15.9%
1850	6,049		6.8%
1860	5,343		−11.7%
1870	5,361		0.3%
1880	6,274		17.0%
1890	5,667		−9.7%
1900	5,474		−3.4%
1910	5,640		3.0%
1920	5,382		−4.6%
1930	5,461		1.5%
1940	5,440		−0.4%
1950	5,223		−4.0%
1960	5,598		7.2%
1970	5,453		−2.6%
1980	5,829		6.9%
1990	5,904		1.3%
2000	6,885		16.6%
2010	9,980		45.0%
2020	10,355		3.8%
2025 (est.)	11,315	▲	9.3%
U.S. Decennial Census; 1790–1960 1900–1990; 1990–2000 2010 2020

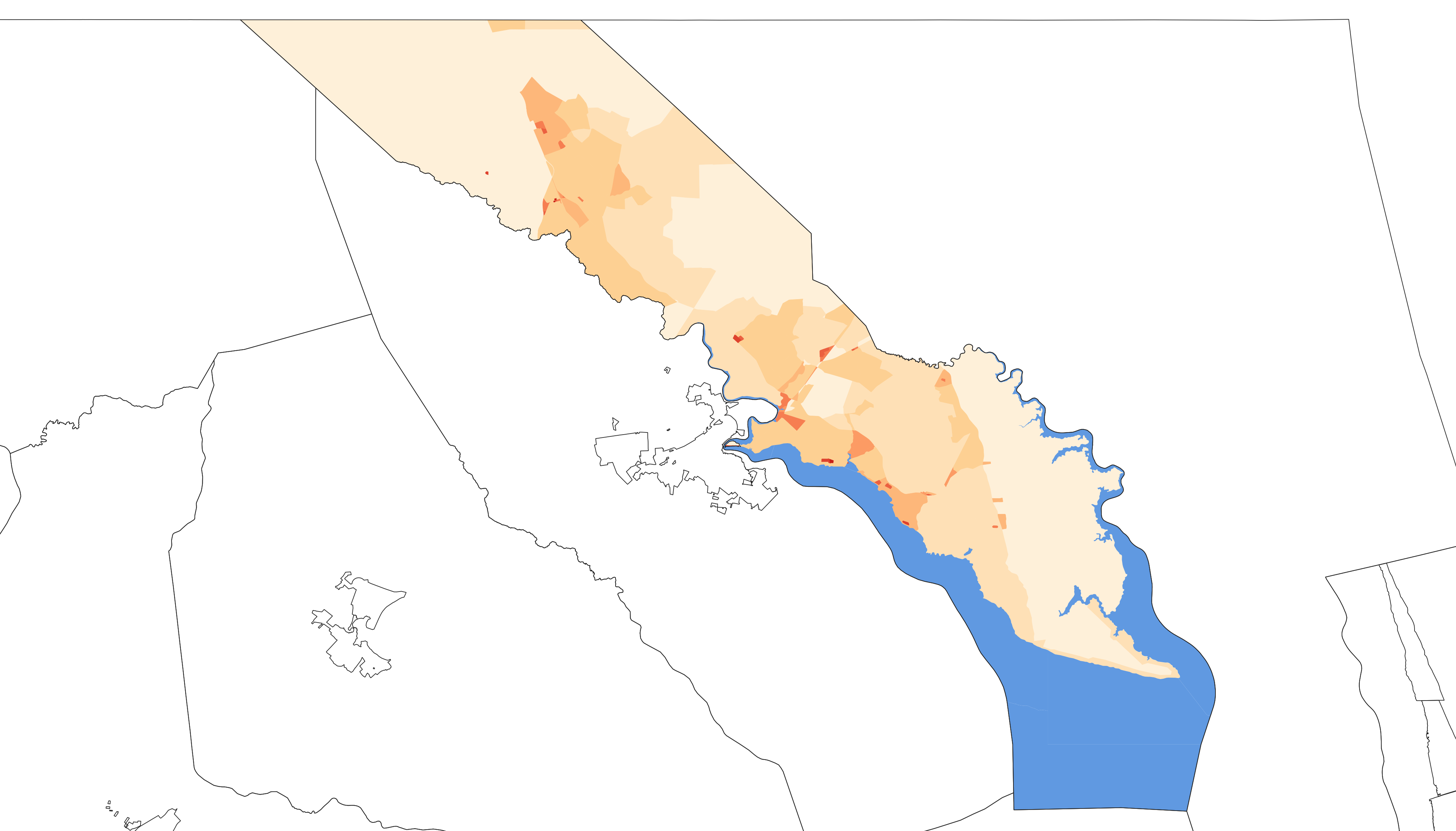
2020 population density of Camden County NC by census block

=== 2020 census ===
Camden County, North Carolina – Racial and ethnic composition Note: the US Census treats Hispanic/Latino as an ethnic category. This table excludes Latinos from the racial categories and assigns them to a separate category. Hispanics/Latinos may be of any race.
Race / Ethnicity (NH = Non-Hispanic)	Pop 1980	Pop 1990	Pop 2000	Pop 2010	Pop 2020	% 1980	% 1990	% 2000	% 2010	% 2020
White alone (NH)	3,923	4,375	5,516	8,103	8,200	67.30%	74.10%	80.12%	81.19%	79.19%
Black or African American alone (NH)	1,849	1,481	1,185	1,299	1,049	31.72%	25.08%	17.21%	13.02%	10.13%
Native American or Alaska Native alone (NH)	3	16	28	32	40	0.05%	0.27%	0.41%	0.32%	0.39%
Asian alone (NH)	9	8	39	145	118	0.15%	0.14%	0.57%	1.45%	1.14%
Native Hawaiian or Pacific Islander alone (NH)	x	x	2	3	1	x	x	0.03%	0.03%	0.01%
Other race alone (NH)	8	0	0	0	53	0.14%	0.00%	0.00%	0.00%	0.51%
Mixed race or Multiracial (NH)	x	x	66	183	554	x	x	0.96%	1.83%	5.35%
Hispanic or Latino (any race)	37	24	49	215	340	0.63%	0.41%	0.71%	2.15%	3.28%
Total	5,829	5,904	6,885	9,980	10,355	100.00%	100.00%	100.00%	100.00%	100.00%

As of the 2020 census, there were 10,355 people, 3,875 households, and 3,154 families residing in the county.

The median age was 40.8 years. 23.8% of residents were under the age of 18 and 16.3% of residents were 65 years of age or older. For every 100 females there were 99.5 males, and for every 100 females age 18 and over there were 97.2 males age 18 and over.

The racial makeup of the county was 80.3% White, 10.2% Black or African American, 0.5% American Indian and Alaska Native, 1.1% Asian, <0.1% Native Hawaiian and Pacific Islander, 1.2% from some other race, and 6.7% from two or more races. Hispanic or Latino residents of any race comprised 3.3% of the population.

5.2% of residents lived in urban areas, while 94.8% lived in rural areas.

Of these households, 37.3% had children under the age of 18 living in them. Of all households, 60.9% were married-couple households, 15.0% were households with a male householder and no spouse or partner present, and 18.2% were households with a female householder and no spouse or partner present. About 19.7% of all households were made up of individuals and 9.8% had someone living alone who was 65 years of age or older.

There were 4,119 housing units, of which 5.9% were vacant. Among occupied housing units, 83.4% were owner-occupied and 16.6% were renter-occupied. The homeowner vacancy rate was 1.2% and the rental vacancy rate was 4.8%.

=== 2010 census ===
At the 2010 census, there were 9,980 people, 2,662 households, and 2,023 families residing in the county. The population density was 29 people per square mile (11 people/km^{2}). There were 2,973 housing units at an average density of 12 units per square mile (4.6 units/km^{2}). The racial makeup of the county was 82.1% White, 13.2% Black or African American, 0.3% Native American, 1.5% Asian, 0.1% Pacific Islander, 0.7% from other races, and 2.1% from two or more races. 2.2% of the population were Hispanic or Latino of any race.

There were 2,662 households, out of which 31.60% had children under the age of 18 living with them, 62.20% were married couples living together, 9.40% had a female householder with no husband present, and 24.00% were non-families. 20.70% of all households were made up of individuals, and 9.50% had someone living alone who was 65 years of age or older. The average household size was 2.58 and the average family size was 2.97.

In the county, the population was spread out, with 24.50% under the age of 18, 6.30% from 18 to 24, 30.50% from 25 to 44, 25.20% from 45 to 64, and 13.60% who were 65 years of age or older. The median age was 39 years. For every 100 females there were 98.40 males. For every 100 females age 18 and over, there were 96.90 males.

The median income for a household in the county was $39,493, and the median income for a family was $45,387. Males had a median income of $36,274 versus $24,875 for females. The per capita income for the county was $18,681. 10.10% of the population and 7.90% of families were below the poverty line. Out of the total people living in poverty, 12.60% are under the age of 18 and 20.30% are 65 or older.

=== Demographic change ===
The county's population changed little between 1830 and 1970, averaging at about 5,500 residents. It grew slightly between 1970 and 1990, and then grew rapidly between 1990 and 2000.

== Government and politics ==
Camden County is a member of the Albemarle Commission regional council of governments. It is represented by Bobby Hanig in the 1st district in the North Carolina State Senate and Edward Charles Goodwin in the 1st district in the North Carolina House of Representatives.

United States presidential election results for Camden County, North Carolina
Year	Republican		Democratic		Third party(ies)	
Year	No.	%	No.	%	No.	%
1912	40	9.88%	303	74.81%	62	15.31%
1916	86	18.86%	368	80.70%	2	0.44%
1920	142	20.82%	540	79.18%	0	0.00%
1924	132	22.88%	436	75.56%	9	1.56%
1928	245	28.19%	624	71.81%	0	0.00%
1932	78	7.85%	915	92.05%	1	0.10%
1936	117	10.40%	1,008	89.60%	0	0.00%
1940	134	12.24%	961	87.76%	0	0.00%
1944	193	21.09%	722	78.91%	0	0.00%
1948	127	16.30%	576	73.94%	76	9.76%
1952	340	25.45%	996	74.55%	0	0.00%
1956	343	29.67%	813	70.33%	0	0.00%
1960	338	25.00%	1,014	75.00%	0	0.00%
1964	534	38.03%	870	61.97%	0	0.00%
1968	180	9.06%	707	35.58%	1,100	55.36%
1972	909	60.20%	556	36.82%	45	2.98%
1976	562	31.07%	1,231	68.05%	16	0.88%
1980	813	38.94%	1,212	58.05%	63	3.02%
1984	1,282	54.25%	1,075	45.49%	6	0.25%
1988	1,144	50.87%	1,081	48.07%	24	1.07%
1992	1,039	38.84%	1,153	43.10%	483	18.06%
1996	1,074	41.86%	1,186	46.22%	306	11.93%
2000	1,628	57.51%	1,187	41.93%	16	0.57%
2004	2,480	64.75%	1,339	34.96%	11	0.29%
2008	3,140	65.13%	1,597	33.13%	84	1.74%
2012	3,109	66.09%	1,508	32.06%	87	1.85%
2016	3,546	70.83%	1,274	25.45%	186	3.72%
2020	4,312	72.43%	1,537	25.82%	104	1.75%
2024	4,716	74.81%	1,522	24.14%	66	1.05%

== Education ==
There are five schools in Camden County Schools: Grandy Primary School, Camden Intermediate School, Camden Middle School, Camden County High School, and Camden Early College. However, one other former school lies in Shiloh. It was a community school for the Shiloh area. The Shiloh School sign is still visible on the top of the facade at the front of the building.

== Communities ==
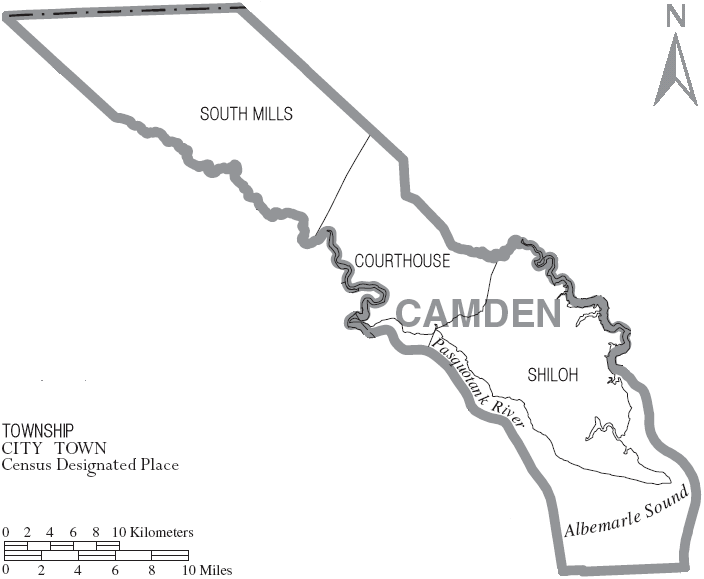
Map of Camden County with municipal and township labels

=== City ===
- Elizabeth City (mostly in Pasquotank County)

=== Census-designated places ===
- Camden (county seat and largest community)
- South Mills

=== Unincorporated communities ===
- Black Swamp
- Old Trap
- Shiloh

=== Townships ===
- Courthouse
- Shiloh
- South Mills

== See also ==
- List of counties in North Carolina
- National Register of Historic Places listings in Camden County, North Carolina

== Works cited ==
- Corbitt, David Leroy (2000). The formation of the North Carolina counties, 1663-1943 (reprint ed.). Raleigh: North Carolina Division of Archives and History. OCLC 46398241.
- Jennings, A. Burgess (2014). Camden County. Images of America. Arcadia Publishing. ISBN 9781439647196.
