= Currituck National Wildlife Refuge =

National Wildlife Refuge in North Carolina, United States

- IUCN category IV (habitat/species management area)
- Location within the United States Location within North Carolina
- Location: Currituck County, North Carolina, United States
- Nearest city: Knotts Island, North Carolina
- Coordinates: 36.4683°N 75.8566°W
- Area: 8,316 acres (33.65 km^{2})
- Established: 1984
- Governing body: U.S. Fish and Wildlife Service
- Website: Currituck National Wildlife Refuge

Currituck National Wildlife Refuge (/ˈkʊrɪtʌk/), located on the northern end of North Carolina's Outer Banks, was established in 1984 to preserve and protect the coastal barrier island ecosystem. Refuge lands are managed to provide wintering habitat for waterfowl and to protect endangered species such as piping plover, sea turtles, and seabeach amaranth.

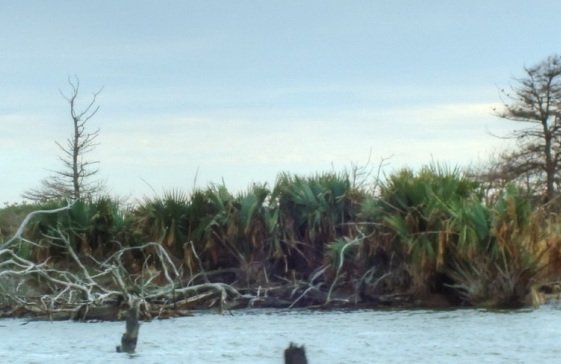
Sabal Minor Palms on Monkey Island, NC

Habitat types common to most barrier islands are found on the refuge. Moving westward from the Atlantic Ocean to Currituck Sound, these habitats include sandy beaches, grassy dunes, interdunal wetlands (flats), maritime forests and shrub thickets. Currituck Sound's shoreline is made up of brackish water marshes and occasionally, mudflats that have been exposed by wind tides. A few forested islands also exist on the refuge. Monkey Island, a noted bird rookery, provides nesting habitat to several species of wading birds. It is also currently the most northerly known native habitat of the Sabal minor palm. In addition to Sabal palms, vegetation within these diverse habitat types include several varieties of beach grasses, live oak, loblolly pine, wax myrtle, cattails, sedges and rushes, black needlerush (Juncus roemerianus) and giant cordgrass (Spartina cynosuroides).

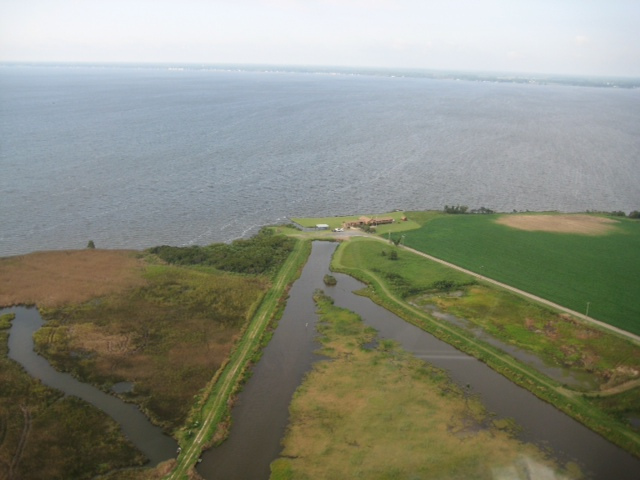
Aerial view of the refuge headquarters along the coastline in the Currituck National Wildlife Refuge.

Various types of wading birds, shorebirds, waterfowl, raptors, mammals (including feral horses), reptiles, and amphibians common to the eastern United States, are found on the refuge. The endangered piping plover and loggerhead sea turtle sometimes nest on refuge beaches and dunes.

The refuge has a surface area of 8,316 acres (33.65 km^{2}).

== Climate ==
According to the Trewartha climate classification system, Currituck National Wildlife Refuge, North Carolina has a humid subtropical climate with hot and humid summers, cool winters and year-around precipitation (Cfak). Cfak climates are characterized by all months having an average mean temperature > 32.0 °F (> 0.0 °C), at least eight months with an average mean temperature ≥ 50.0 °F (≥ 10.0 °C), at least one month with an average mean temperature ≥ 71.6 °F (≥ 22.0 °C) and no significant precipitation difference between seasons. During the summer months in Currituck National Wildlife Refuge, a cooling afternoon sea breeze is present on most days, but episodes of extreme heat and humidity can occur with heat index values ≥ 100 °F (≥ 38 °C). Currituck National Wildlife Refuge is prone to hurricane strikes, particularly during the Atlantic hurricane season which extends from June 1 through November 30, sharply peaking from late August through September. During the winter months, episodes of cold and wind can occur with wind chill values < 10 °F (< -12 °C). The plant hardiness zone in Currituck National Wildlife Refuge is 8a with an average annual extreme minimum air temperature of 14.2 °F (-9.9 °C). The average seasonal (Dec-Mar) snowfall total is < 2 inches (< 5 cm), and the average annual peak in nor'easter activity is in February.

Climate data for Currituck National Wildlife Refuge, NC (1981-2010 Averages)
Month	Jan	Feb	Mar	Apr	May	Jun	Jul	Aug	Sep	Oct	Nov	Dec	Year
Mean daily maximum °F (°C)	49.3 (9.6)	50.8 (10.4)	56.7 (13.7)	65.7 (18.7)	73.0 (22.8)	81.1 (27.3)	84.7 (29.3)	83.4 (28.6)	78.4 (25.8)	70.2 (21.2)	61.4 (16.3)	52.7 (11.5)	67.4 (19.7)
Daily mean °F (°C)	42.2 (5.7)	43.8 (6.6)	49.4 (9.7)	58.1 (14.5)	66.1 (18.9)	74.8 (23.8)	79.0 (26.1)	77.9 (25.5)	73.1 (22.8)	63.6 (17.6)	54.3 (12.4)	45.8 (7.7)	60.8 (16.0)
Mean daily minimum °F (°C)	35.1 (1.7)	36.8 (2.7)	41.9 (5.5)	50.5 (10.3)	59.2 (15.1)	68.5 (20.3)	73.3 (22.9)	72.5 (22.5)	67.8 (19.9)	57.0 (13.9)	47.2 (8.4)	38.9 (3.8)	54.1 (12.3)
Average precipitation inches (mm)	3.62 (92)	3.08 (78)	3.72 (94)	3.25 (83)	3.46 (88)	4.04 (103)	4.51 (115)	5.26 (134)	4.49 (114)	3.50 (89)	3.24 (82)	3.30 (84)	45.47 (1,155)
Average relative humidity (%)	70.0	70.1	67.3	67.3	70.7	74.4	75.8	75.4	74.2	71.7	72.9	72.0	71.8
Average dew point °F (°C)	33.1 (0.6)	34.7 (1.5)	39.0 (3.9)	47.3 (8.5)	56.3 (13.5)	66.1 (18.9)	70.7 (21.5)	69.5 (20.8)	64.4 (18.0)	54.3 (12.4)	45.8 (7.7)	37.3 (2.9)	51.6 (10.9)
Source: PRISM

Climate data for Duck, NC Ocean Water Temperature (21 S Currituck National Wildlife Refuge)
Month	Jan	Feb	Mar	Apr	May	Jun	Jul	Aug	Sep	Oct	Nov	Dec	Year
Daily mean °F (°C)	45 (7)	44 (7)	46 (8)	59 (15)	67 (19)	74 (23)	71 (22)	74 (23)	75 (24)	69 (21)	59 (15)	52 (11)	61 (16)
Source: NOAA

== Ecology ==
According to the A. W. Kuchler U.S. potential natural vegetation types, Currituck National Wildlife Refuge, North Carolina would have a dominant vegetation type of Northern Cordgrass (73) with a dominant vegetation form of Coastal Prairie (20).

Preceded by False Cape	Beaches of The Outer Banks	Succeeded by Corolla
