= Big cordgrass =

Big cordgrass is a common name for several plants and may refer to:

- Desmostachya bipinnata, native to northern Africa and Asia
- Spartina cynosuroides, native to eastern North America
