= Brackish marsh =

Marsh with brackish level of salinity

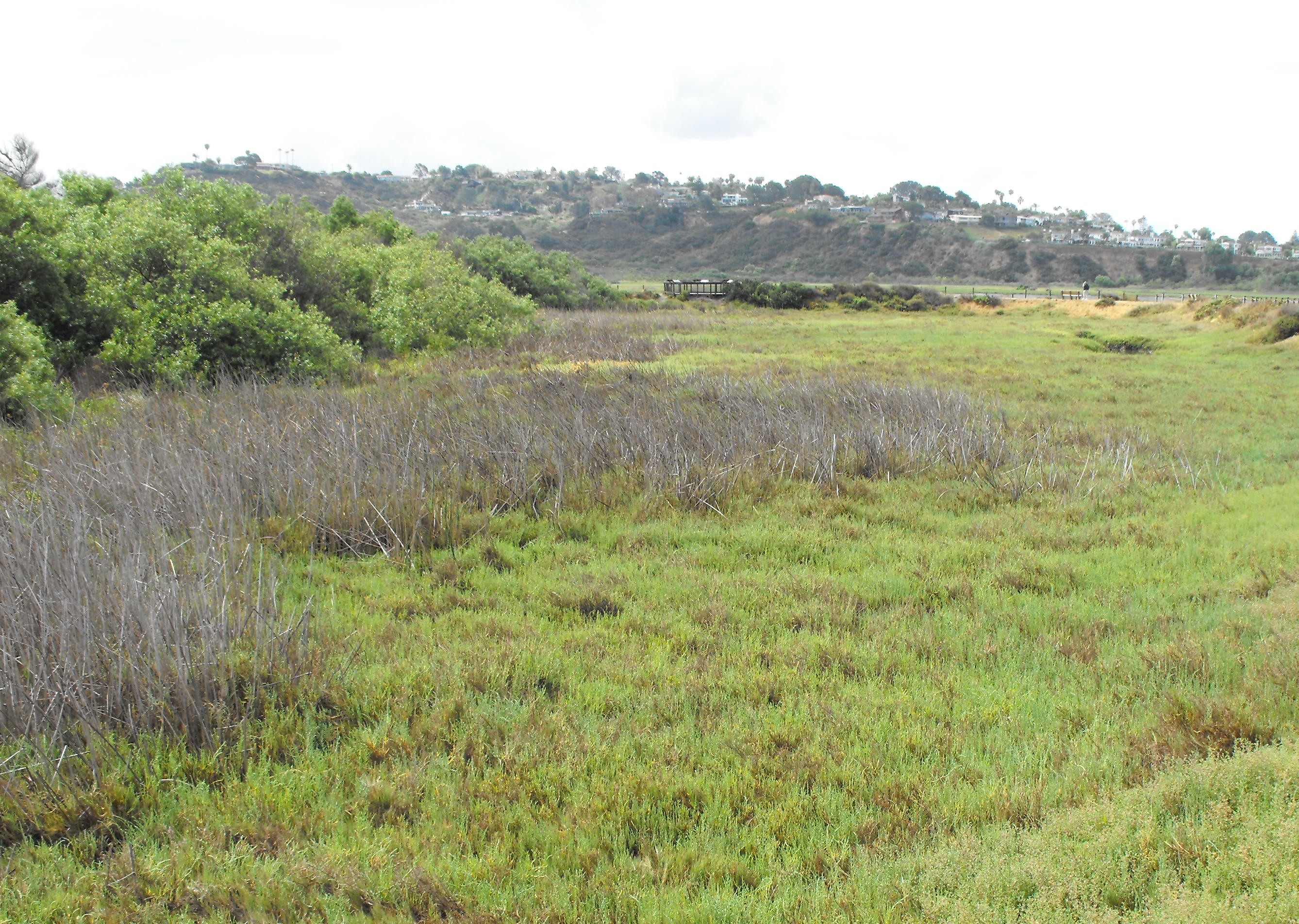
A brackish marsh section of San Elijo Lagoon in San Diego County, California

Brackish marshes develop from salt marshes where a significant freshwater influx dilutes the seawater to brackish levels of salinity. This commonly happens upstream from salt marshes by estuaries of coastal rivers or near the mouths of coastal rivers with heavy freshwater discharges in the conditions of low tidal ranges.

== Characteristics ==
The salinity levels in brackish marshes can range from 0.5 ppt to 35 ppt. Marshes are also characterised by low-growing vegetation and bare mud or sand flats. Due to the variations in salinity, brackish marshes create a distinctive ecosystem where plants from either freshwater or saltwater marshes can co-inhabit. The salinity levels also change with the tides, decreasing at low tide and increasing at high tide as ocean water feeds farther upriver.

=== Ecosystem Services ===
- Reduces coastline erosion
- Provides a coastal buffer from storms
- Mitigates flooding
- Filters and stores excess nitrogen from runoff water
- Provides habitats for aquatic organisms
- Coastal wetlands sequester more carbon than any other environment

== Biodiversity ==
In terms of biodiversity, a brackish marsh serves a unique ecological niche. Its vegetation is a byproduct of its salinity levels. High salinity serves as an evolutionary barrier for most plants, creating a less diverse number of plant species as an ecosystem moves from fresh to saltwater. Thus, there are only a few colonies of saltwater native plants in freshwater and almost no freshwater plants in saltwater ecosystems. However, in brackish marshes both types of plants are prevalent and are in fact high in plant productivity. Examples include, arrow arum (Peltandra virginica), soft rush (Juncus effusus), cattail (Typha), and sawgrass (Cladium).

These plants are usually halophytic in order to survive these conditions. For example brackish sites in Georgia, U.S., are dominated by species such as smooth cord grass (Sporobolus alterniflora), big cordgrass (Spartina cynosuroides), and black rush (Juncus roemerianus). Other communities are cabbage palm (Sabal palmetto), sand cordgrass (Spartina bakeri), black rush (Juncus roemerianus), saltgrass (Distichlis spicata, Paspalum distichum), and mixed halophytes (Batis maritima, Salicomia virginica). Along with salinity, brackish marshes face high physical stress due to flooding and wave currents creating adaptive traits within the plant community.

These plant communities also create an environment that provides a nursery for juvenile fish, crustaceans, and birds. Fauna use the shallow habitat and the turbidity of the water to protect themselves from predators. Similarly the surface of the marsh is covered with vegetation which is used by the nekton species for shelter, leaving enough space to move underneath between the stems.

The trophic levels within a brackish marsh has been shown to depend on the amount of macro organic matter in the upper level of soil. This macro organic matter is believed to be the food source of detritivore benthic animals that support higher trophic levels. These materials build up as the marsh matures, making age another factor in the biodiversity of a brackish marsh.

Algae also make up a large part of the biodiversity in brackish marshes. The most common algae, diatoms, make up a large portion of the algal community in brackish marshes. Diatoms are eukaryotic microorganisms that have a cell wall that is composed of silica and can exists in freshwater or marine environments making them good candidates for brackish marshes. These diatoms can be either planktic, which float freely in the water column, or benthic, which attach to a substrate. Some examples of diatoms that can be found in brackish marshes are from the genera (Navicula), (Nitzschia), (Diploneis), (Cyclotella), (Cymbella), (Fragilaria), (Gyrosigma), (Tabularia), (Amphora) (Cocconeis), and many more. Many different organisms in these brackish marshes depend on diatoms as a food source so they are ecologically important. Some examples of organisms that feed on diatoms are bivalves, mollusks, fish, copepods, decapod larvae, and ducks, as well as many others. Many organisms in these brackish marshes consume diatoms so they are very valuable to maintaining balance in these types of ecosystems.

Another group of algae that is present in brackish marshes are fucoid algae. This is a type of brown macroalgae in the class Phaeophyceae. Brown algae are eukaryotic stramenopiles which means that they are at one point flagellated and most people know them as seaweeds in coastal areas. Examples of brown algae that have been found in brackish marshes are Fucus vesiculosus, Ascophyllum nodosum, the genus Sphacelaria, and many others.

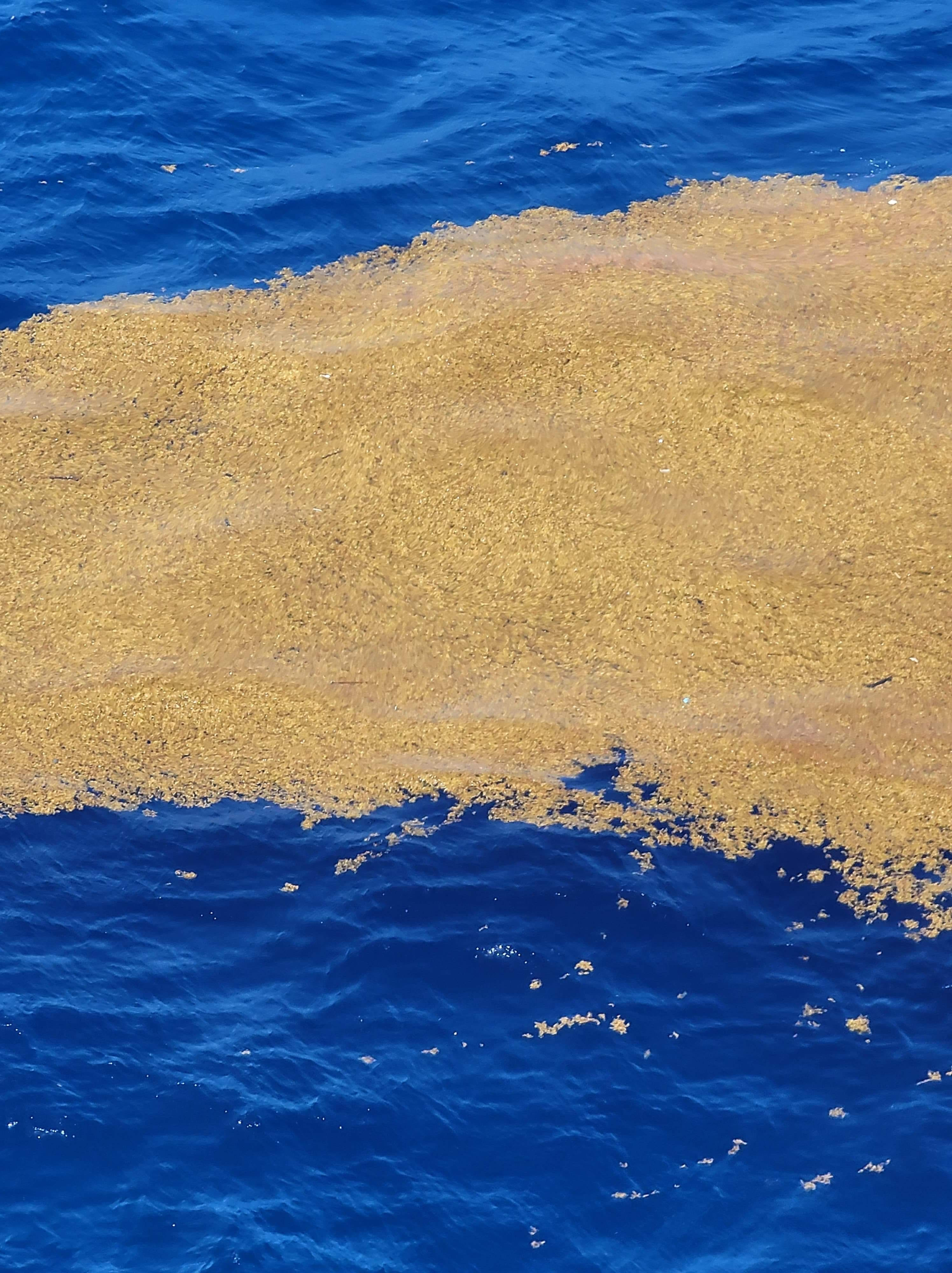
Brown algae- Sargassum

Yellow-green algae can also be found in brackish marshes. Yellow-green algae are eukaryotic algae in the class Xanthophyceae. An example of this is Vaucheria.

Green algae can also be found in brackish marshes. Some examples of the different genera of green algae that can be found in brackish marshes are Enteromorpha, Ulothrix, Rhizoclonium, Blidingia, Percursaria, and many others.

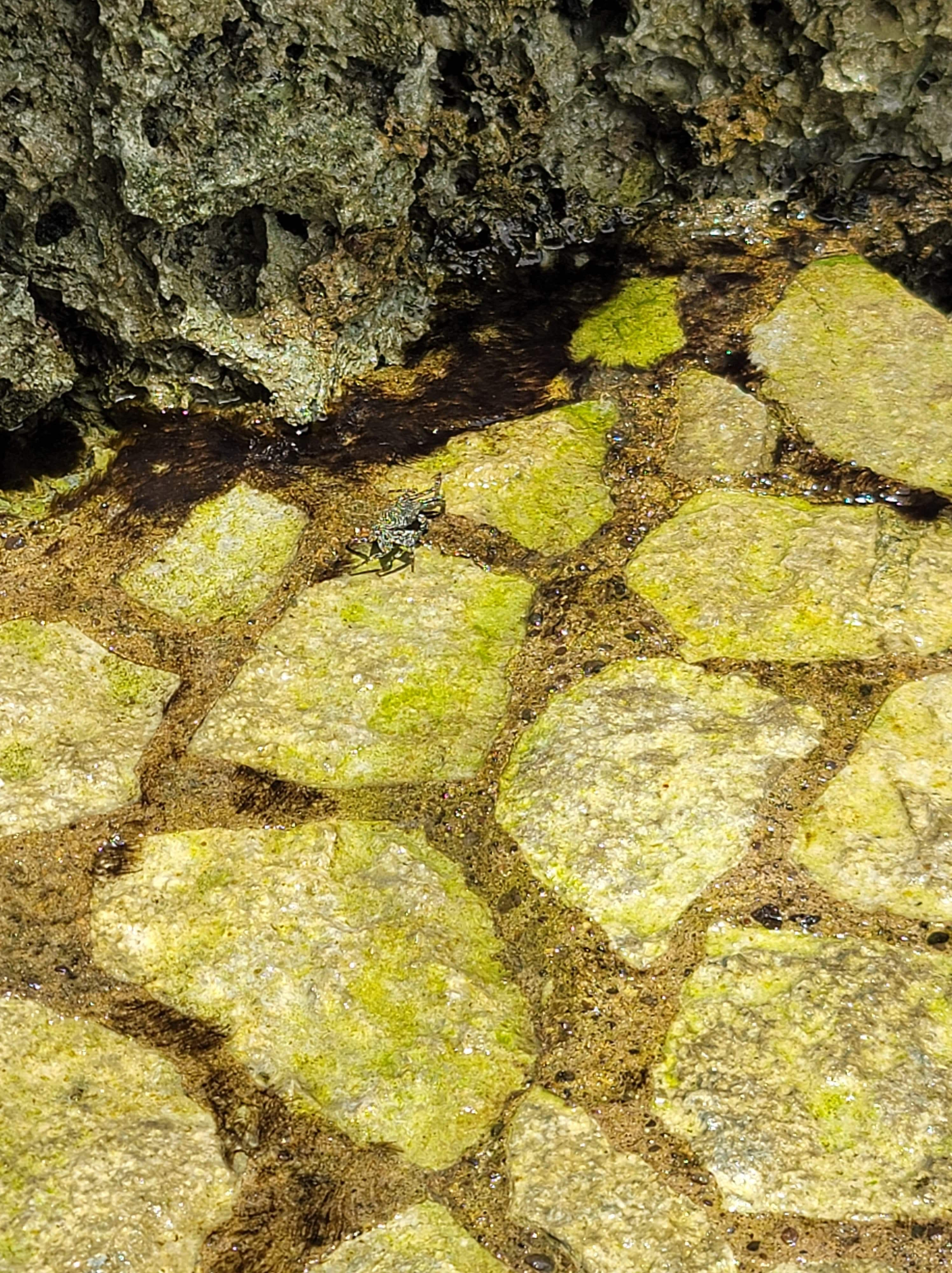
Green Algae on Rocks in Jamaica

Typically, sedges and grasses dominate the vegetation in brackish marshes. Plants in brackish marshes are salinity tolerant and they tolerate frequent flooding. They also have frequent tidal waves disturbing the area as well as seasonal hurricanes and tropical storms. (Julia bass) According to (Makenzie) plants in coastal marshes resist salinity by refraining from the uptake of salt via their root system. Some examples of plants that grow in brackish marshes are Panicum hemitomon, Spartina patens, Zostera japonica, Haloxylon recurvum, Juncus roemerianus, Borrichia frutescens, Schoenoplectus americanus, Distichlis spicata and many others.

== Human use and impacts ==
Brackish marshes are very important for flood control. However, they are often subject to heavy pollution and habitat degradation from land reclamation. For example, the Indian River Lagoon has suffered significant man-made changes since the 1940s. Marshes were often dredged or impounded to prevent mosquitoes, however this led to the disruption of connectivity by replacing marshes with open water. These changes prevented fires that allowed invasive species to move into the remaining marshes.

Brackish marsh environments are especially susceptible to human degradation; they are ideal areas for land conversion and development because they aren't rocky and tend to be located in temperate coastal regions. Brackish marshes are areas that can provide connections for both land and water access.

There are many ways humans have disrupted and degraded brackish marshes. When humans divert water from these marshes it leads to land sinking, also known as subsidence. Humans have also modified the vegetation of brackish marshes to change water and sediment flow. Brackish marshes have been subjected to an overabundance of nutrients and pollutants from industrial and urban sources. Environmental stressors from human impact have changed brackish marsh biodiversity to mainly stress-tolerant invasive grasses. Additionally, negative consequences of climate change, such as sea level rise, will likely begin to harm brackish marsh ecosystems.

Brackish marshes can be restored by human intervention. Studies have found that given that restoration is properly carried out, fish do not discriminate between restored or natural marshes.

== Conservation and threats ==
As in most habitats, the greatest threat towards brackish marshes are humans. Traditionally, direct human activities such as dredging and development are the main cause of destruction. Pollution has also been a threat to brackish marshes through chemical run-off. Once degraded, it could take at least 30 to 90 years for restored marsh soil to become equivalent to a natural marsh in terms of nitrogen and organic carbon profile. In some cases, these process could take over 200 years to achieve the wetland soil characteristics of certain communities.

For conservation, the key is to restrict human activities. Installing a passive management system could help restore certain species using brackish marshes' role as an ecological nursery. For some areas, periodic livestock grazing could help create a better habitat for certain species of birds. Brackish marshes are a unique type of wetland and the local circumstances are paramount to consider for either conservation, biodiversity, or restoration.

Brackish marshes are also great in reducing nutrient pollution such as nitrogen. There are many sources of nitrogen entering the water systems especially in Texas. In Texas there are many dairy farms as well as ranch land and farm land. All these are sources of nitrogen in the Texas water systems. Having large amounts of nitrogen in a water system can cause eutrophication, harmful algal blooms, and fish kills. In wetlands, nitrogen is used by the vascular and non-vascular vegetation to grow, therefore removing the nitrogen naturally and preventing a large amount of nitrogen from entering the coastal region creating anoxic habitats in the ocean. Conservation of the brackish marsh wetlands can be a last resort to help prevent these potential problems.

- Tidal marsh
