= Monkey Island, North Carolina =

Remote island in the United States

Monkey Island
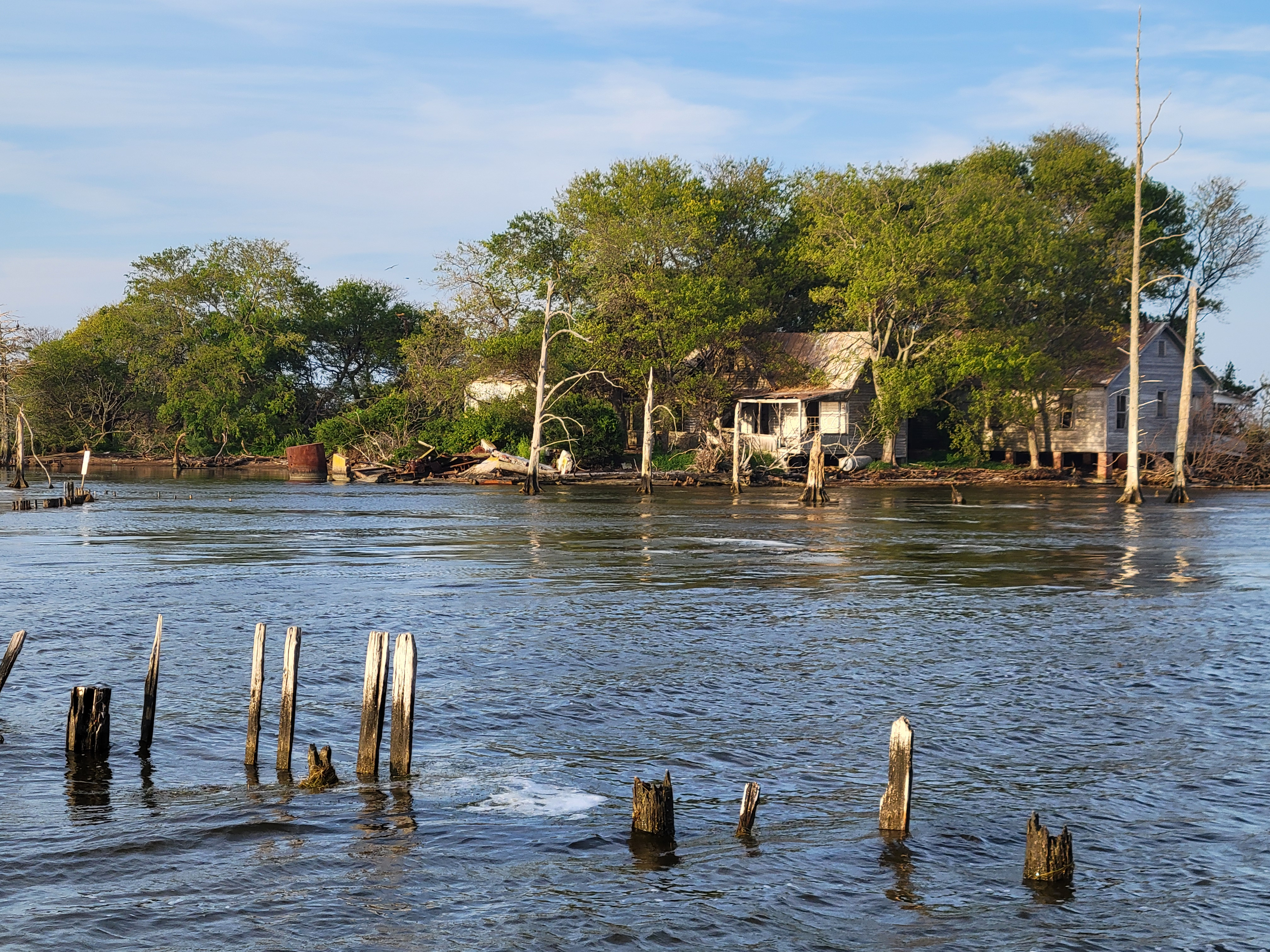
- An abandoned house on Monkey Island

- Location within North Carolina Location within the United States

Geography
- Location: North Carolina
- Coordinates: 36°24′19″N 75°52′13″W
- Adjacent to: Currituck Sound

Administration
- United States

Demographics
- Population: 0

Additional information
- Time zone: Eastern: UTC -5/-4

Monkey Island is a remote, natural island located in Currituck Sound, North Carolina and is part of the Currituck National Wildlife Refuge. Contrary to its name, there are no monkeys on Monkey Island. It is named for the Pamunkey nation that once inhabited the area, and used the island for summer hunting.

The island was also once the site of the Monkey Island Hunting Club, which remains standing today. The Monkey Island Hunting Club was incorporated in 1919 by a group of tobacco executives including George Hill, president of the American Tobacco Company and its Executive Vice-president Charles Penn. It was sold in 1974 and after a series of failed businesses came into the possession of US Fish & Wildlife Service. A bell salvaged from a locomotive was used for many years to help members of local Hunt Clubs navigate the waters around Monkey Island on foggy days. The bell is currently on display in Historic Corolla Village.

Approximately half of the island is forested and has long supported a large colony of wading birds. It is currently the most northerly known native habitat of the Sabal minor palm. The island is often visited by deer that swim from at least a mile away. It is located in Poplar Branch Township, Currituck County, North Carolina.
