= Juncusol =

Names
- Preferred IUPAC name 5-Ethenyl-1,6-dimethyl-9,10-dihydrophenanthrene-2,7-diol
- Other names 1,6-Dimethyl-5-vinyl-9,10-dihydro-2,7-phenanthrenediol

Identifiers
CAS Number	62023-90-9
3D model (JSmol)	Interactive image
ChemSpider	65579
PubChem CID	72740
UNII	6T481HU7OI
CompTox Dashboard (EPA)	DTXSID70211080
- InChI: InChI=1S/C18H18O2/c1-4-13-10(2)17(20)9-12-5-6-14-11(3)16(19)8-7-15(14)18(12)13/h4,7-9,19-20H,1,5-6H2,2-3H3 Key: XNVMKPYDOHZJLR-UHFFFAOYSA-N
- SMILES: CC1=C(C=CC2=C1CCC3=CC(=C(C(=C32)C=C)C)O)O

Properties
Chemical formula	C_{18}H_{18}O_{2}
Molar mass	266.340 g·mol^{−1}
- Except where otherwise noted, data are given for materials in their standard state (at 25 °C [77 °F], 100 kPa). Infobox references

Juncusol is a 9,10-dihydrophrenathrene found in Juncus species such as J. acutus, J. effusus or J. roemerianus.

It can also be synthesized.

This compound shows antimicrobial activity against Bacillus subtilis and Staphylococcus aureus. It also has a toxic effect on estuarine fish and shrimp.
