= Juncus effusus 'Spiralis' =

Perennial plant

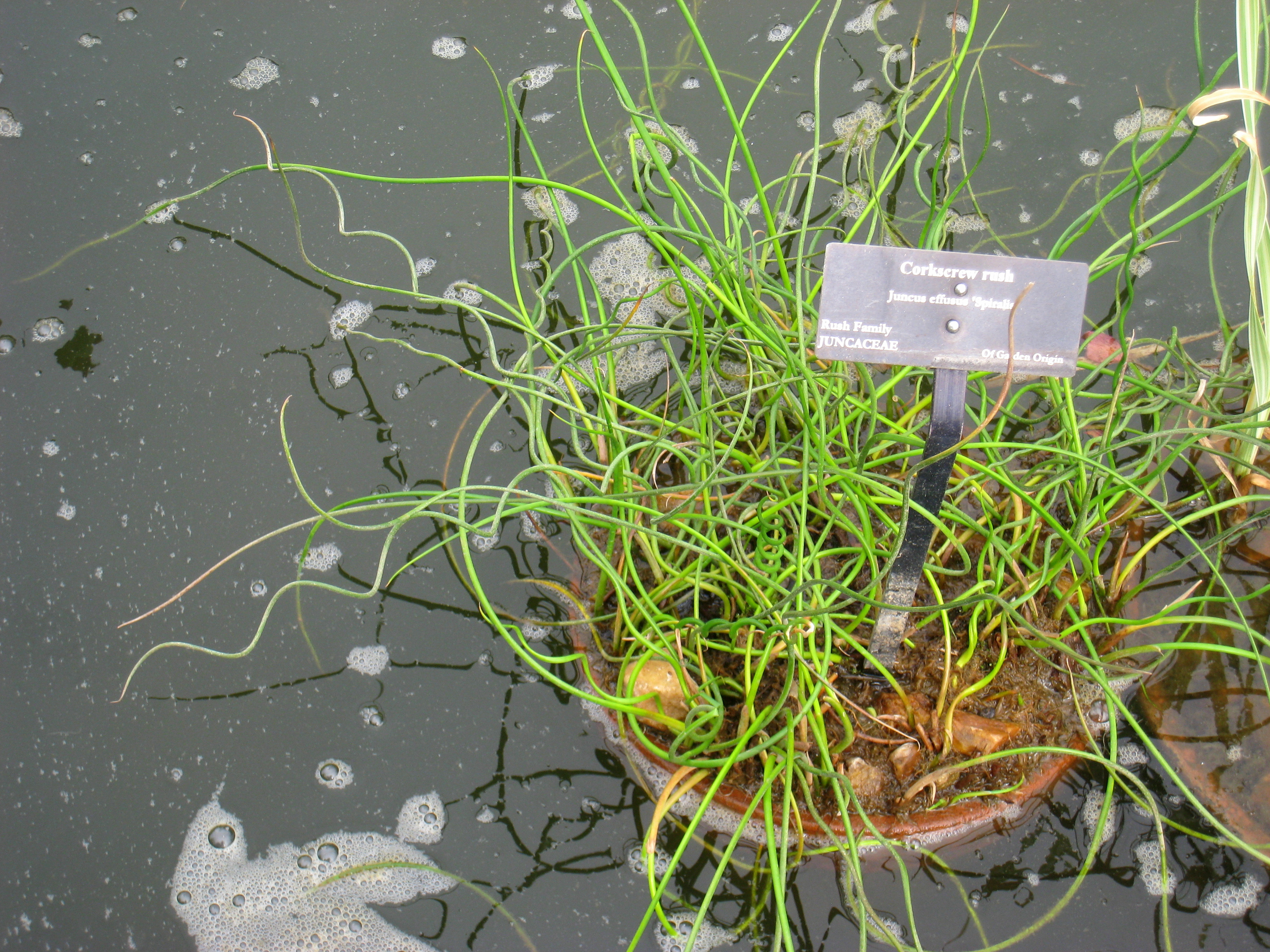
- Species: Juncus effusus
- Cultivar: 'Spiralis'

Juncus effusus 'Spiralis', the corkscrew rush (sometimes referred to as Juncus spiralis), is a perennial plant with green spiraling stems. It is a cultivar of the soft rush, Juncus effusus.

== Description ==
The plants grow to 45 cm (18 in) high. The young, leafless stems are light green and coiled, with the coils becoming looser with age. They grow in both a horizontal and vertical direction. By winter, the stems become a yellow-brown or tan colour. Flowers are both rare and insignificant in terms of the plant’s appearance. They are yellow-green or light brown.

== Origin and name ==
The origin of the cultivar is uncertain, though Japan is thought to be a possibility. The cultivar has also been referred to as Juncus effusus f. spiralis and Scirpus lacustris 'Spiralis'. In the United States the cultivar is often confused with Juncus balticus 'Spiralis'.

== Cultivation ==
The cultivar is often grown as a novelty plant due to its unusual form. It prefers a situation in sun or partial shade and acidic soil. Plants require permanent water, ideally between 5 and 10 cm deep, or continual irrigation. In-ground containers are sometimes used to contain spread. The cultivar is relatively free of pest or diseases, but is susceptible to drought stress. The plants are maintained by the removal of old stems in spring. In North America, they are able to be grown in USDA Hardiness Zones 4 and higher. It is suited to container cultivation and can be used as a houseplant. It can be grown on the edge of water bodies to help control erosion. Propagation is done by division of plants during the active growing phase of the plant. Stems are used in floral arrangements. It can self-seed and become troublesome in some areas.
