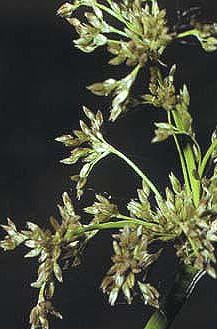

Conservation status
- Least Concern (IUCN 3.1)

- Secure (NatureServe)

Scientific classification
- Kingdom: Plantae
- Clade: Tracheophytes
- Clade: Angiosperms
- Clade: Monocots
- Clade: Commelinids
- Order: Poales
- Family: Juncaceae
- Genus: Juncus
- Species: J. roemerianus

Binomial name
- Juncus roemerianus Scheele

= Juncus roemerianus =

Species of flowering plant

Juncus roemerianus is a species of flowering plant in the rush family known by the common names needlegrass rush, black rush, needlerush, black needlerush and Roemer's rush. It is native to North America, where its main distribution lies along the coastline of the southeastern United States, including the Gulf Coast. It occurs from New Jersey to Texas, with outlying populations in Connecticut, New York, Mexico, and certain Caribbean islands.

== Description ==
This rush is a perennial plant forming tufts of rough, rigid stems and leaves. It is gray-green in color. The plant may appear to be leafless at first glance, but what look like sharp-pointed stems are actually stiff leaves rolled tightly to form pointed cylinders. The true stems are tipped with inflorescences. It grows from a rhizome. This plant is variable in appearance. Its size and shape depend on environmental conditions in its salt marsh habitat. In areas with low soil salinity, the plant can exceed two meters in height, whereas in high-salinity areas the rush is dwarfed, sometimes measuring under 30 centimetres (12 in) tall. Both large and small plants generally occur in one marsh, with the large plants nearest the open water and the small plants occurring on higher ground in the salt flats and other areas of higher salinity. Plants of different sizes differ genetically, as well, with soil salinity being the selective force leading to the genetic variation. The dwarf plants have an adaptation to high soil salinity. Larger plants lack this adaptation, and do not survive when experimentally transplanted to high-salinity environments.

== Reproduction ==
The plant reproduces sexually by seed and vegetatively by sprouting from its spreading rhizome. It expands its dense, sometimes monotypic stands by sending up new stems from the rhizome, and establishes new stands by broadcasting seeds. The species is gynodioecious, with some plants having bisexual flowers and some having only female reproductive parts. The seeds are very viable, germinating readily, but they require light for germination and may fail to sprout if covered in thick mud. Therefore, seedlings are most often seen in open, sandy stretches, and rarely in areas with dense vegetation or thick substrates. The plant grows new shoots and leaves year-round, and does not typically experience seasonal growth spurts. Dead leaves remain on the plant for a long time, leading to an accumulation of plant matter. The species may form much of the physical structure of the marsh.

== Ecology ==
This is a common and ecologically important plant in its range, often dominating salt marshes and estuaries. In northwestern Florida perhaps 60% of all the salt marshes are covered in this species of rush. This species and smooth cordgrass (Spartina alterniflora) are the dominant plants in Mississippi tidal marshes. These two species are often found together, with S. alterniflora occupying lower levels of the marsh and J. roemerianus growing in the mid-level and upper reaches of the marsh. In river estuaries it can occur 10 to 15 miles inland.

Other plants occurring in the higher-salinity regions of the marsh include saltmeadow cordgrass (S. patens), giant cordgrass (S. cynosuroides), saltgrass (Distichlis spicata), glassworts (Salicornia spp.), Olney threesquare (Scirpus americanus), and saltmarsh bulrush (Scirpus robustus). In the brackish marsh, plant associates may include sealavender (Limonium carolinianum) and common arrowhead (Sagittaria latifolia). In the intermediate marsh between the brackish and freshwater marsh levels, other plants include common reed (Phragmites australis), sawgrass (Cladium jamaicense), softstem bulrush (Scirpus validus), and Virginia iris (Iris virginica).

This rush provides cover for a number of salt marsh animal species. Birds such as the long-billed marsh wren, clapper rail, and seaside sparrow nest in it. Rice rats nest in it and prey on the eggs of the local birds. A number of fungal species grow on this rush, some exclusively. The ascomycete species Aquamarina speciosa, Keissleriella rara, Massarina carolinensis, and Paraphaeosphaeria pilleata were described from dead or dying stems of this rush. Also, the fungus Juncigena adarca (Juncigenaceae, Torpedosporales) was only found on the senescent leaves (decaying leaves) of Juncus roemerianus, on the Atlantic coast (U.S.A.: North Carolina).

== Potential uses ==
This plant has shown potential as an agent of phytoremediation after oil spills. When it grows in sediments polluted with diesel fuel it reduces the concentration of total petroleum hydrocarbons, polycyclic aromatic hydrocarbons, and n-alkanes in the sediments.

== Chemistry ==
Juncusol is a 9,10-dihydrophenathrene derivative found in J. roemerianus.
