= Tidal marsh =

Marsh subject to tidal change in water

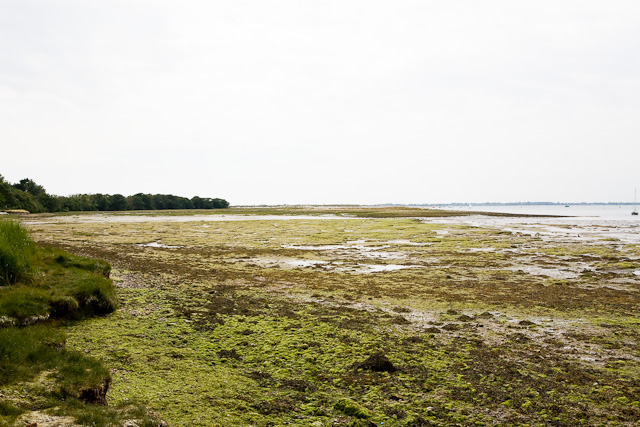
Tidal salt marsh at Ella Nore in Chichester, England.

A tidal marsh (also known as a type of "tidal wetland") is a marsh found along rivers, coasts and estuaries which floods and drains by the tidal movement of the adjacent estuary, sea or ocean. Tidal marshes experience many overlapping persistent cycles, including diurnal and semi-diurnal tides, day-night temperature fluctuations, spring-neap tides, seasonal vegetation growth and decay, upland runoff, decadal climate variations, and centennial to millennial trends in sea level and climate.

Tidal marshes are formed in areas that are sheltered from waves (such as beside edges of bays), in upper slopes of intertidal, and where water is fresh or saline. They are also impacted by transient disturbances such as hurricanes, floods, storms, and upland fires.

The state of tidal marshes can be dependent on both natural and anthropogenic processes. In recent periods, human practices, small and large scale, have caused changes in ecosystems that have had a significant impact on the preservation of tidal marsh ecosystems. Some smaller scale changes include headward (i.e. upstream) erosion and coastal development. Large system changes include pollution and sea level rise (from climate change). These changes are all putting pressure on tidal marshes.

Elements of a tidal marsh and how they relate to the tides. Open with the play button, then scroll to change the tide.

== Types ==
Tidal marshes can be found in two main places: coasts and estuaries. Coastal tidal marshes lie along coasts and estuarine tidal marshes lie inland within the tidal zone. Coastal tidal marshes are found within coastal watersheds and encompass a variety of types including fresh and salt marshes, bottomland hardwood swamps, mangrove swamps, and palustrine wetlands. Estuarine tidal marshes are found in estuaries, areas where freshwater streams flow into brackish areas.

They can be categorized based on salinity level, elevation, and sea level. Tidal marshes are commonly zoned into lower marshes (also called intertidal marshes) and upper/ high marshes, based on their elevation above sea level. A middle marsh zone also exists for freshwater tidal marshes. Location determines the controlling processes, age, disturbance regime, and future persistence of tidal marshes. Tidal marshes are differentiated into freshwater, brackish, and salt according to the salinity of their water.

=== Freshwater ===
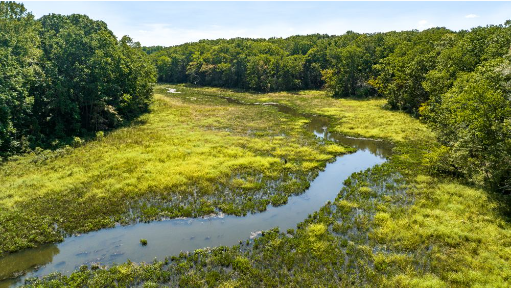
A creek runs through a tidal marsh in Mallows Bay Park in Charles County, Maryland, in the Chesapeake Bay drainage basin.

Freshwater tidal marshes live more inland than saltwater marshes, but their proximity to the coast still allows for daily fluctuations from tides. The inland location allows for a majority of the water content to be from freshwater stream discharge, meaning the salt content is low.

Tidal freshwater marshes are further divided into deltaic and fringing types.

Extensive research has been conducted on deltaic tidal freshwater marshes in the Chesapeake Bay, which were formed as a result of historic deforestation and intensive agriculture.

Freshwater tidal marshes are highly productive and are home to a variety of organisms. There is a variety of vegetation that can reside in freshwater marshes. There is also a vast amount of insects which attract birds, such as wrens and warrens. Aquatic birds, such as ducks and herons, also live in these marshes. Freshwater tidal marshes also serve as spawning grounds for anadromous fish, such as shad and herring. These fish spend most of their lives in saltwater areas, but return to freshwater during reproduction.

Tidal freshwater marshes are also highly productive, generate a large amount of good quality biomass. They also serve as good waste treatment areas, based on denitrification potential.

=== Saltwater ===
Saltwater tidal marshes live on coastlines in areas that are not completely exposed to the open ocean. The volume of water is dependent on the tides. Plant variation throughout marshes can be due to differences in tide exposure and frequency.

Some different types include bottomland hardwood swamps, mangrove swamps, and palustrine wetlands.

Saltwater tidal marshes are correlated with higher decomposition rates and lower denitrification rates.

==== Island and barrier island ====
Tidal Marshes also form between a main shoreline and barrier islands. These elongated shifting landforms evolve parallel and in close proximity to the shoreline of a tidal marsh. Many become fully submerged at high tide, and become directly attached to the mainland when at low tide. Barrier island formation includes mechanisms such as offshore bar theory, spit accretion theory, and climate change.

== Ecosystem services ==
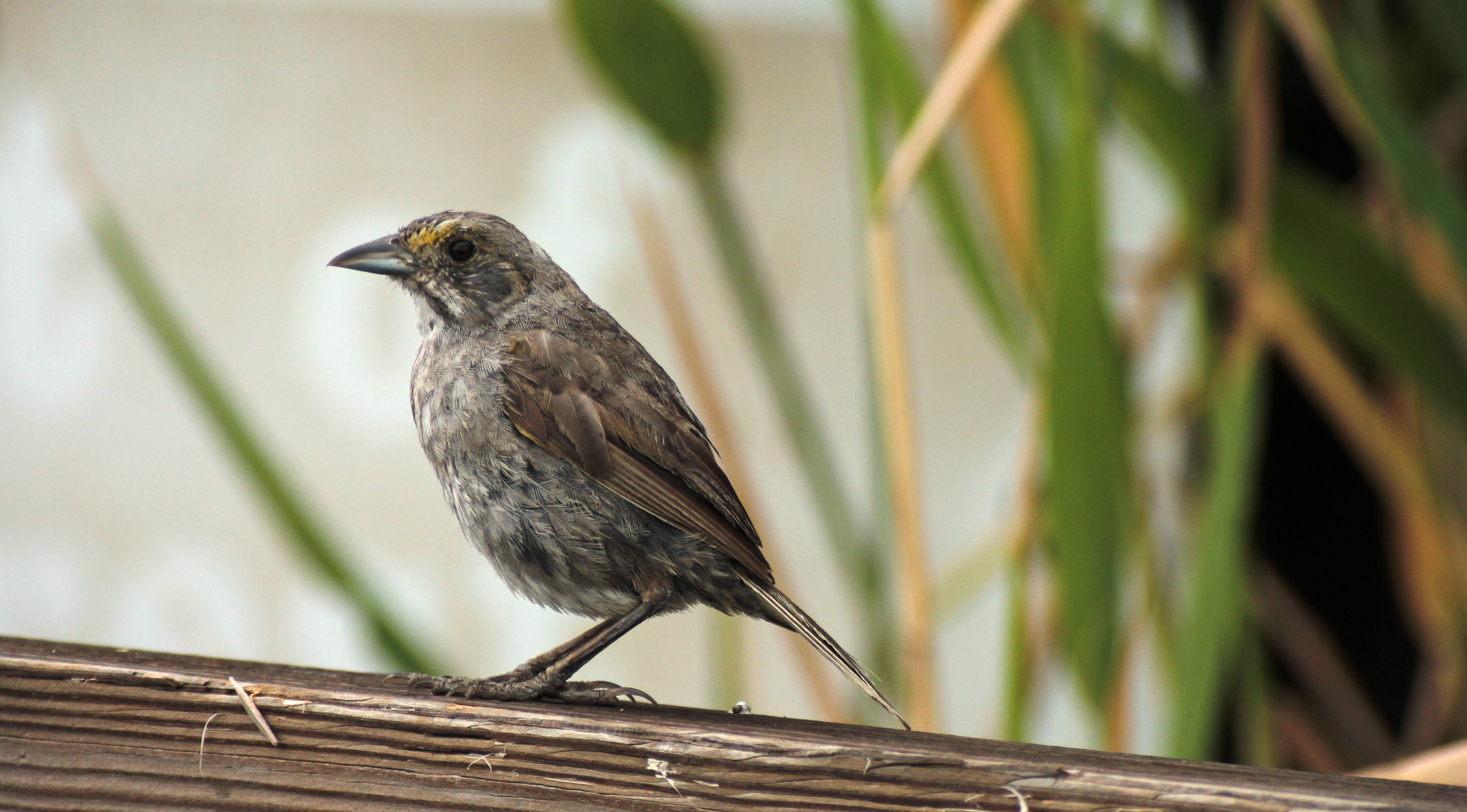
Seaside sparrow (Ammospiza maritima).

Tidal marshes ecosystems provide numerous services, including supplying habitats to support a diverse range of biodiversity. Their areas are spawning grounds and home to "feeder fish" that lie low on the food chain, and serve as crucial rest-stops for migratory birds. Additionally, they provide suitable habitat to various tidal salt marsh specialist bird species, such as the seaside sparrow (Ammospiza maritima) and the willet (Tringa semipalmata) found in tidal marshes in Connecticut, U.S.

Other ecosystem services include their role as significant carbon sinks and shoreline stabilizers. Tidal marshes provide flood protection to upland areas by storing ground water, and lessen the impact of storm surges on nearby shorelines. Tidal marshes located along coastlines also act as intricate filtration systems for watersheds. These areas absorb and trap pollutants from water run-off that travels from higher elevations to open water.

== Anthropogenic threats ==
Historically, the global loss of tidal marshes can be attributed to the implementation of tidal restrictions and other draining activities. Tidal restrictions methods include diking, tide gates, and impoundments, which were implemented on coastal lands internationally in favour of creating agricultural land, as exemplified with large-scale diking that has occurred in Atlantic Canada and the U.S. (e.g. in The Bay of Fundy).

Historical changes (due to anthropogenic activity) to tidal marshes have a lasting impact on them today. Tidal marshes have experienced the Gold Rush which filled some marshes with sediment due to erosion. Logging has also damaged tidal marshes due to their decomposition and filling of marshes. Tidal marshes sensitivity to anthropogenic activity have created long lasting affects.

Currently, rising sea levels is one of the leading threats to tidal marshes caused by global warming and climate change. Pollution due to urbanization also continues to endanger tidal marsh ecosystems.

== Restoration ==
Restoration of tidal marshes through the removal of tidal restrictions to re-establish degraded ecosystem services have been underway internationally for decades. Deliberate and natural restoration practices have been implemented in the U.S., United Kingdom, Europe, and Canada. Research shows that tidal marsh restoration can be evaluated through various factors, such as vegetation, biogeochemical responses (e.g. salinity, sediment deposition, pH, and carbon sequestration), hydrologic responses, and wildlife community responses.

== See also ==
- Salt marsh – Coastal ecosystem between land and open saltwater that is regularly flooded
- Brackish marsh – Marsh with brackish level of salinity
- Mudflat, also known as Tidal flat – Coastal wetlands where sediments have been deposited by tides or rivers
