= Aquamarina =

Scientific classification
- Kingdom: Fungi
- Division: Ascomycota
- Class: Dothideomycetes
- Subclass: incertae sedis
- Genus: Aquamarina; Kohlm., Volkm.-Kohlm. & O.E.Erikss. (1996)

Type species
- Aquamarina speciosa Kohlm., Volkm.-Kohlm. & O.E.Erikss. (1996)

Genus of fungi

Aquamarina is a fungal genus in the class Dothideomycetes. It is a monotypic genus, containing the single marine species Aquamarina speciosa, originally found in North Carolina, and distributed in the Atlantic Coast of the United States. The bluish-green species fruits exclusively in the lower parts of dying culms of the saltmarsh plant Juncus roemerianus.

== Taxonomy, classification, and naming ==
The species was first described by mycologists Jan Kohlmeyer, Brigitte Volkmann-Kohlmeyer, and Ove Eriksson in a 1996 Mycological Research publication. The generic name is derived from the Latin aquamarinus, meaning "a clear sea-green verging towards blue". The specific epithet speciosa is Latin for 'beautiful' or 'splendid', and refers to the "beautifully colored ascomata".

The relationship of this taxon to other taxa within the Dothideomycetes is unknown (incertae sedis) with respect to ordinal and familial placement.

== Description ==
The leathery aquamarine fruit bodies, or ascomata, of A. speciosa are roughly spherical, measuring 225–345 μm high and 240–360 μm in diameter. The ascomata have a long neck 165–345 μm long by 60–110 μm wide; the neck and lower part of the spherical head are immersed under a hard cortex. The heads have an ostiole (opening) that appears as a small dot on the culm surface. The ascomata contain paraphyses, which are unbranched hyphae that line the inner cavity. The two-layered peridium has an inner hyaline (translucent) layer that forms a textura angularis (a parenchyma-like tissue of very densely packed cells that appear angular in cross section); the outside layer forms a bluish-green textura intricata (a tissue formed by intricately interwoven hyphae). The hamathecium (tissues surrounding the asci within the central part of the ascoma) is made of paraphyses covered with gelatinous material. The asci (spore-bearing cells) are 130–180 by 6.5–9.5 μm, eight-spored, cylindrical, short-stalked, thin-walled, unitunicate (made of a single functional layer), and have an apical non-amyloid ring near the top. The asci develop successively on tissue at the base of the locule. The ascospores are uniseriate (lined up in a single row in the ascus), spindle-shaped, three-septate, and hyaline, measuring 18–24 by 5–7 μm.

== Habitat and distribution ==
Aquamarina speciosa grows on the culms (stems) of the saltmarsh Juncus roemerianus, typically in an area between 2 and 13 cm (0.8 and 5.1 in) above the rhizome. The culms are about 1.5 m (4.9 ft) long, and in age will start dying back from the tip of the plant. The lower part of the culm is covered with sediment, algae, and fungi which are exposed to salt-water twice in a 24-hour period owing to the action of tides; any species growing on this area are considered obligate marine. A. speciosa is found on the Atlantic Coast of North America, and is one of over 100 species of fungi that grow on J. roemerianus.
