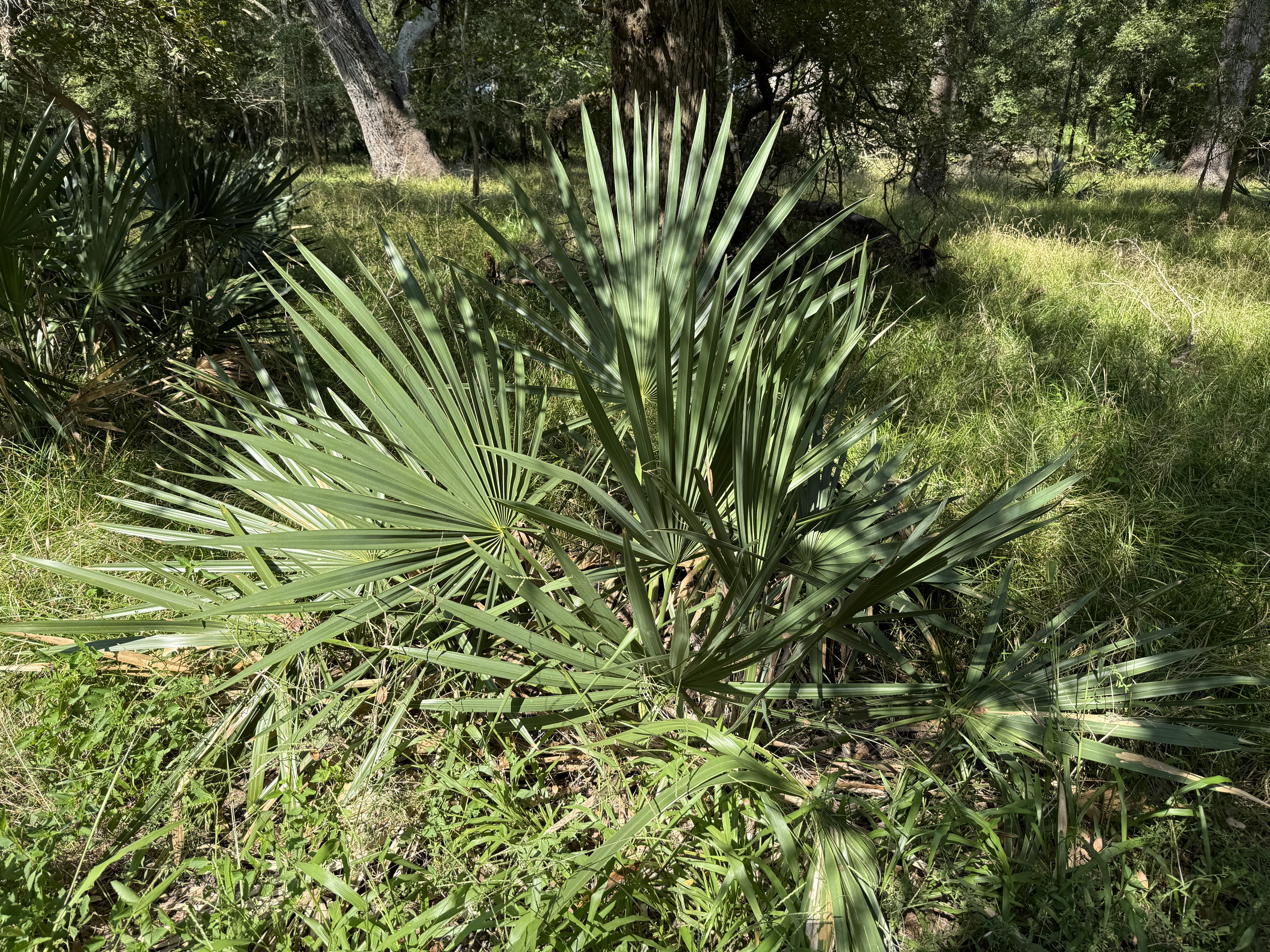
- Sabal minor in Brazos Bend State Park, Texas

Conservation status
- Least Concern (IUCN 3.1)

- Secure (NatureServe)

Scientific classification
- Kingdom: Plantae
- Clade: Tracheophytes
- Clade: Angiosperms
- Clade: Monocots
- Clade: Commelinids
- Order: Arecales
- Family: Arecaceae
- Genus: Sabal
- Species: S. minor

Binomial name
- Sabal minor (Jacq.) Pers.

Synonyms
- Synonymy: Corypha minor Jacq.; Sabal adansonii Guerns.; Chamaerops glabra Mill.; Corypha pumila Walter; Rhapis arundinacea Aiton; Chamaerops acaulis Michx.; Sabal caroliniana Poir.; Rhapis acaulis (Michx.) Walter ex Willd.; Chamaerops arundinacea (Aiton) Sm.; Chamaerops louisiana Darby; Sabal adiantina Raf.; Sabal pumila (Walter) Elliott; Sabal minima Nutt.; Chamaerops sabaloides Baldwin ex Darl.; Brahea minima (Nutt.) H.Wendl.; Sabal glabra (Mill.) Sarg.; Sabal deeringiana Small; Sabal floribunda Katzenstein; Sabal speciosa L.H.Bailey; Sabal louisiana (Darby) Bomhard

= Sabal minor =

Species of palm

Sabal minor, commonly known as the dwarf palmetto, is a small species of palm. It is native to the deep southeastern and south-central United States and northeastern Mexico. It is naturally found in a diversity of habitats, including maritime forests, swamps, floodplains, and occasionally on drier sites. It is often found growing in calcareous marl soil. Sabal minor is one of the most frost and cold tolerant among North American palms.

== Distribution ==
This palm's native range spans on the Atlantic Coast from central Florida north to at least Monkey Island, North Carolina, possibly also extreme southeastern Virginia. On the Gulf Coast, it spans from central Florida to central Texas, Arkansas, north to southern Oklahoma and northern Alabama in the Coosa Valley, then south in the State of Nuevo León in Mexico.

== Description ==
Sabal minor grows up to 3 meters (9.8 ft) in height, with a trunk up to 30 centimeters (12 in) diameter. It is a fan palm (Arecaceae tribe Corypheae), with the leaves with a bare petiole terminating in a rounded fan of numerous leaflets. Each leaf is 1.5–2 m (4 ft 11 in – 6 ft 7 in) long, with 40 leaflets up to 80 cm (31 in) long, conjoined over half of this length. The flowers are yellowish-white, 5 millimeters (0.20 in) across, produced in large compound panicles up to 2 m (6 ft 7 in) long, extending out beyond the leaves. The fruit is a black drupe 1 to 1.3 cm (0.4 to 0.5 in) long containing a single seed.

While usually being small and shrubby, Sabal minor can become tree-like as it ages.

== Cultivation ==
Sabal minor is one of the most cold hardy palms in cultivation; however, it does best when grown in continental climates with hot and humid tropical summer conditions, and may struggle or grow slowly in cool summer oceanic climates. It is hardy to around −15 °C (5 °F), with selected cultivars hardy to −20 °C (−4 °F) when established. It is generally cultivated in subtropical and warm temperate climates. S. minor can grow in a wide variety of soil types, and is often found submerged in swamps in the southeastern United States. It grows in both full sun and shaded locations, though it will do best in the cooler garden zones (below USDA Zone 7) in full sun and a wind-sheltered location.

In the United States, since the 1960s, cultivation of Sabal minor has spread beyond the deep southern United States. S. minor is cultivated along the East Coast from Florida to Connecticut, and on the West Coast from Vancouver BC south to San Diego. It is a recommended horticultural plant by the Virginia Cooperative Extension. There are several cultivars, including those from the Outer Banks of North Carolina (northernmost strains), and those from Oklahoma and Texas. One popular strain is 'McCurtain', named after McCurtain County, Oklahoma, where they are native. These tend to remain trunkless and smaller than those from warmer areas. S. minor is a popular landscape palm in coastal resort areas from Virginia Beach, Virginia, to southern Texas.

== Gallery ==
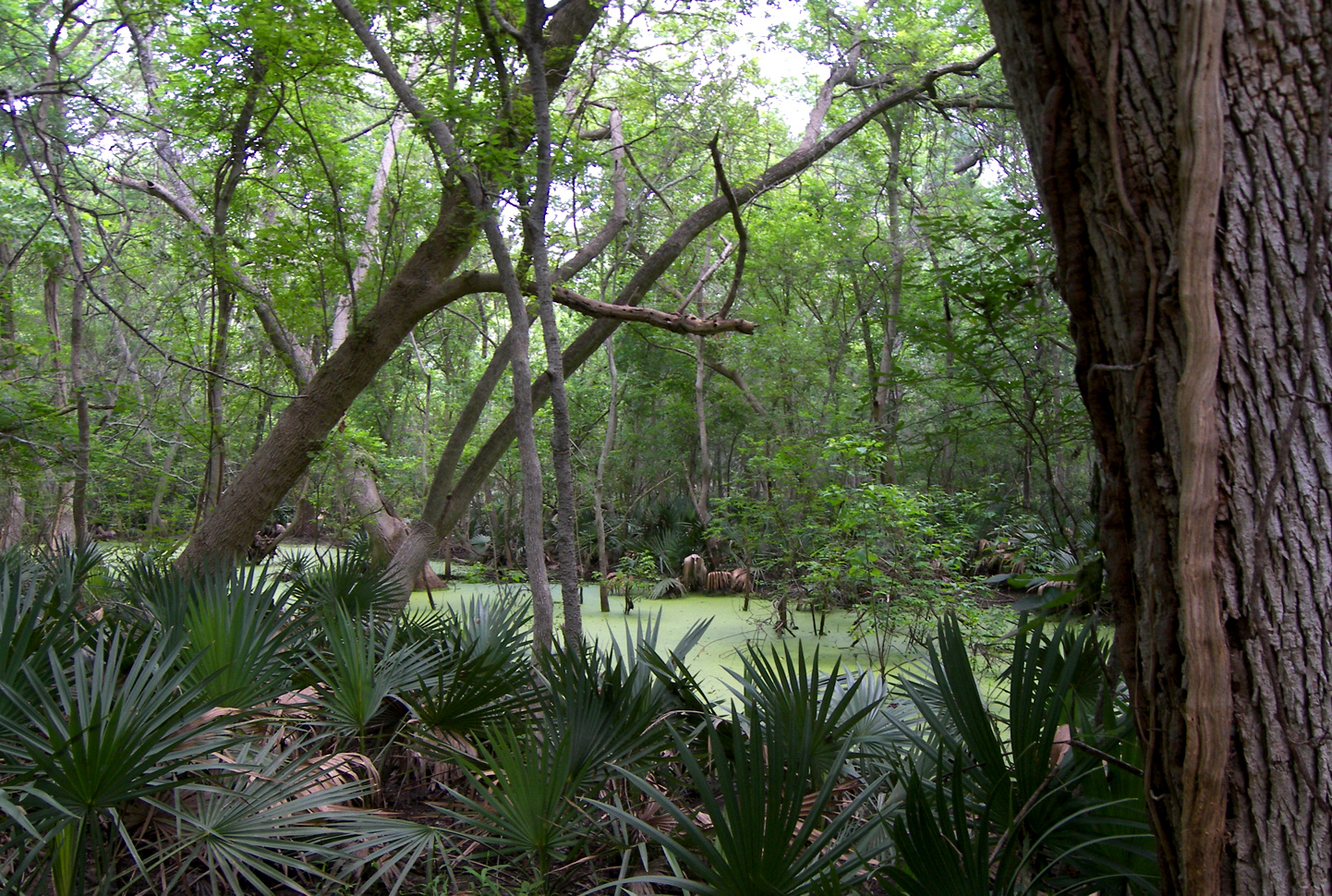
Dwarf palmettos (Sabal minor) at Palmetto State Park, Texas

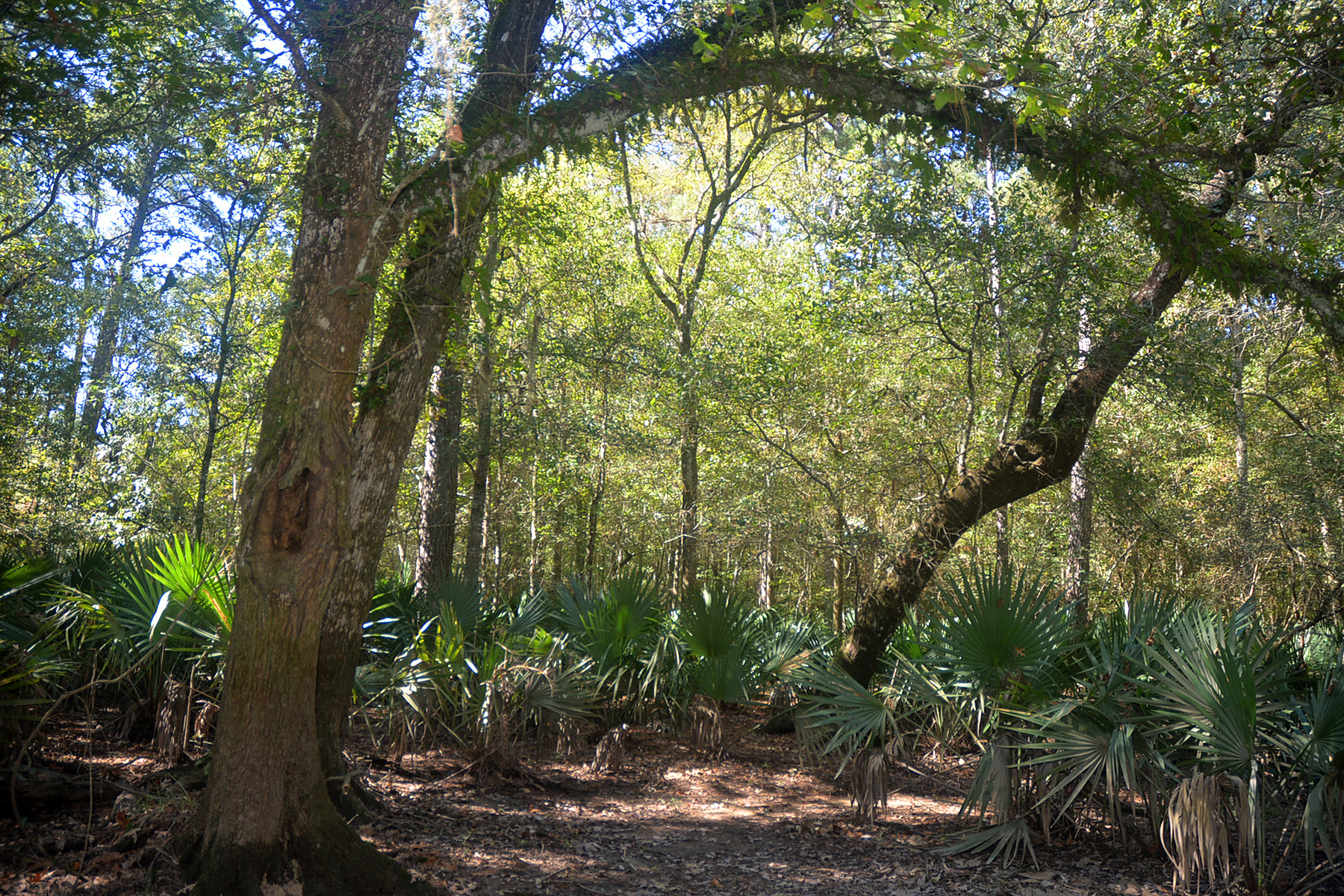
Sabal minor growing under an oak canopy, Big Thicket National Preserve, Hardin County, Texas

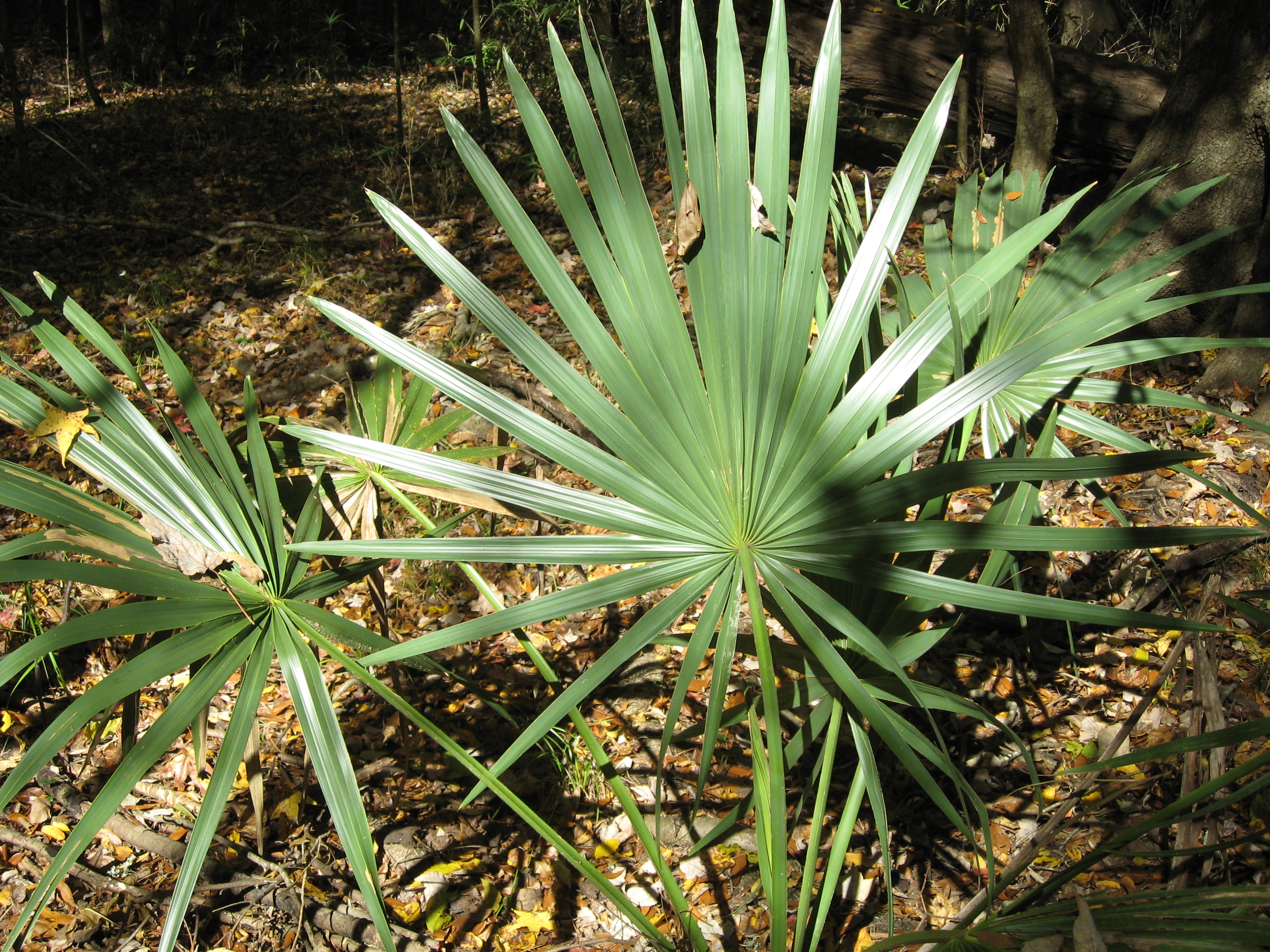
A dwarf palmetto frond in Congaree National Park, South Carolina

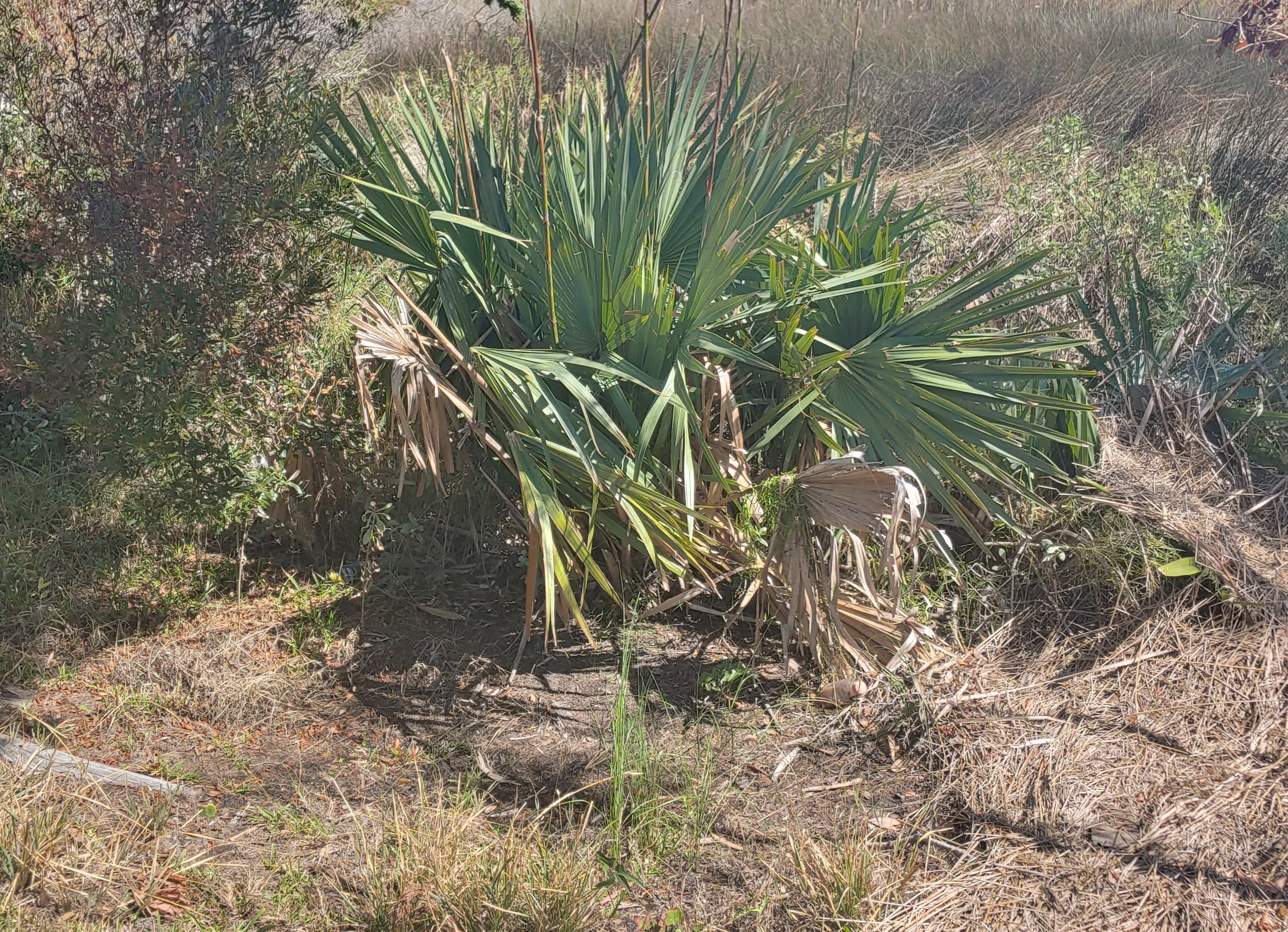
Sabal minor in saltwater marsh habitat, Hatteras North Carolina.

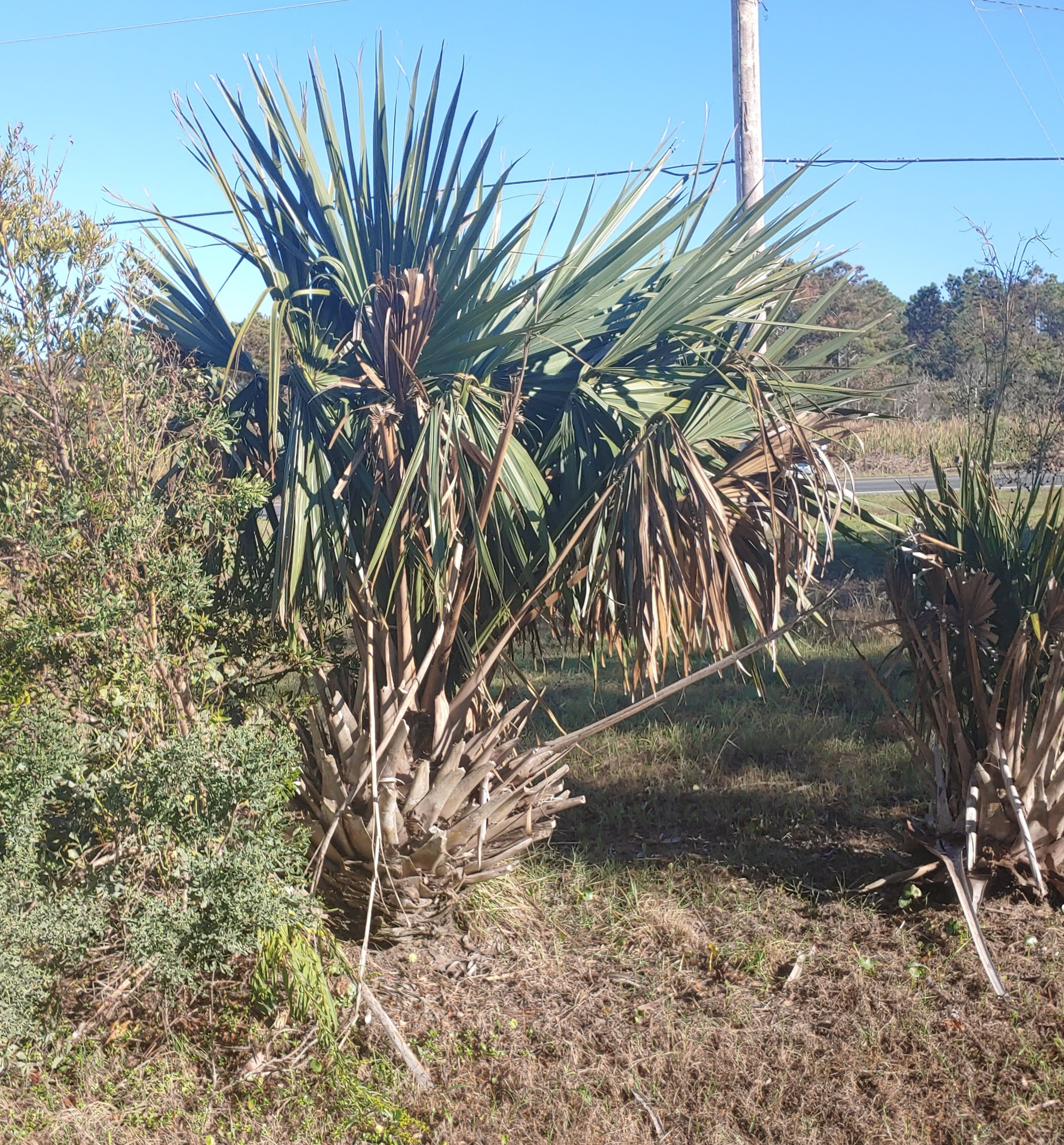
Sabal minor often start showing a trunk once they get very old. This example is around 100 years old in Frisco, North Carolina.

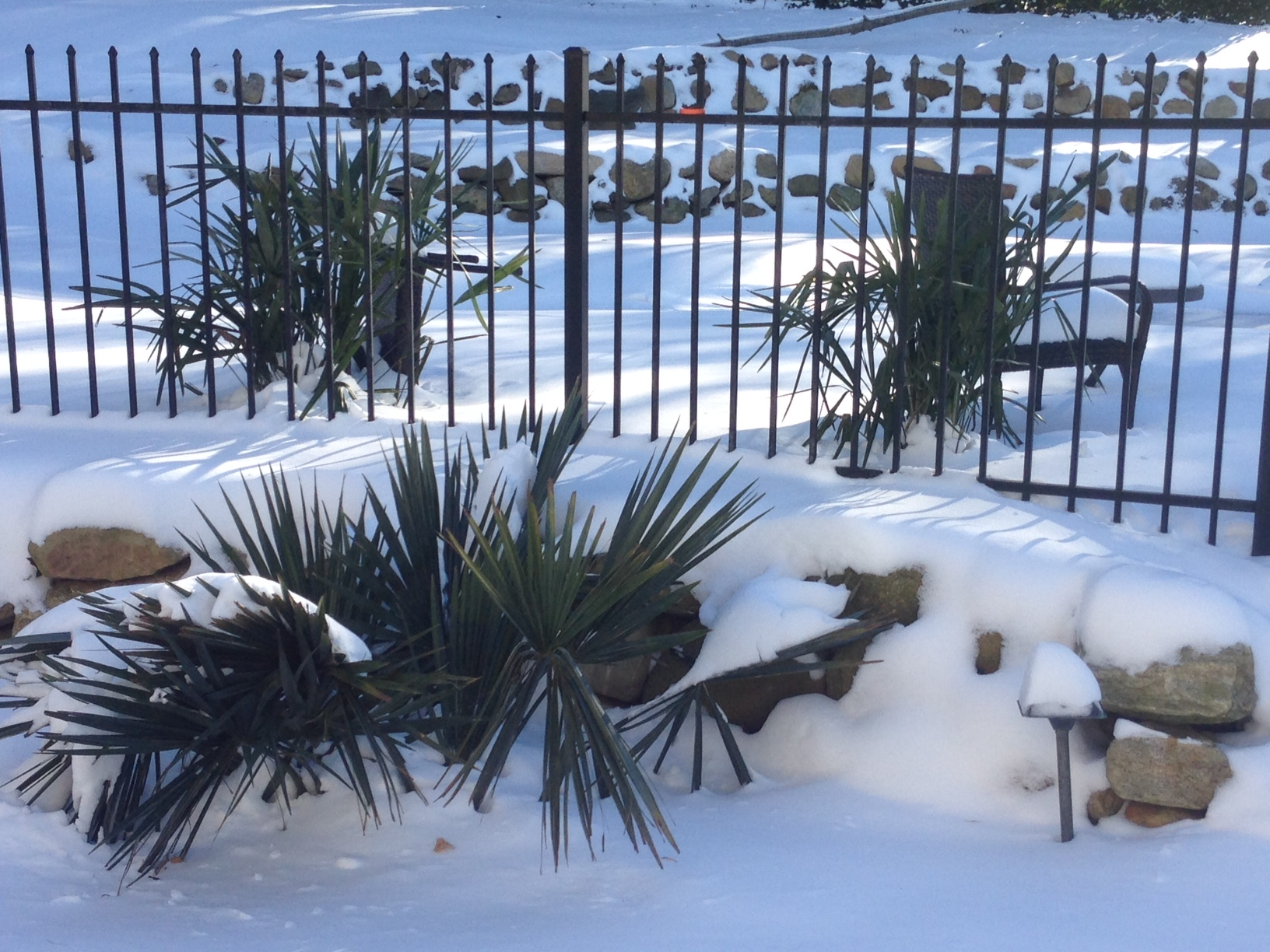
Sabal minor (front) and Rhapidophyllum hystrix (needle palm; behind fence), are some of the world's most freeze-hardy palm species. Roslyn Harbor, New York.

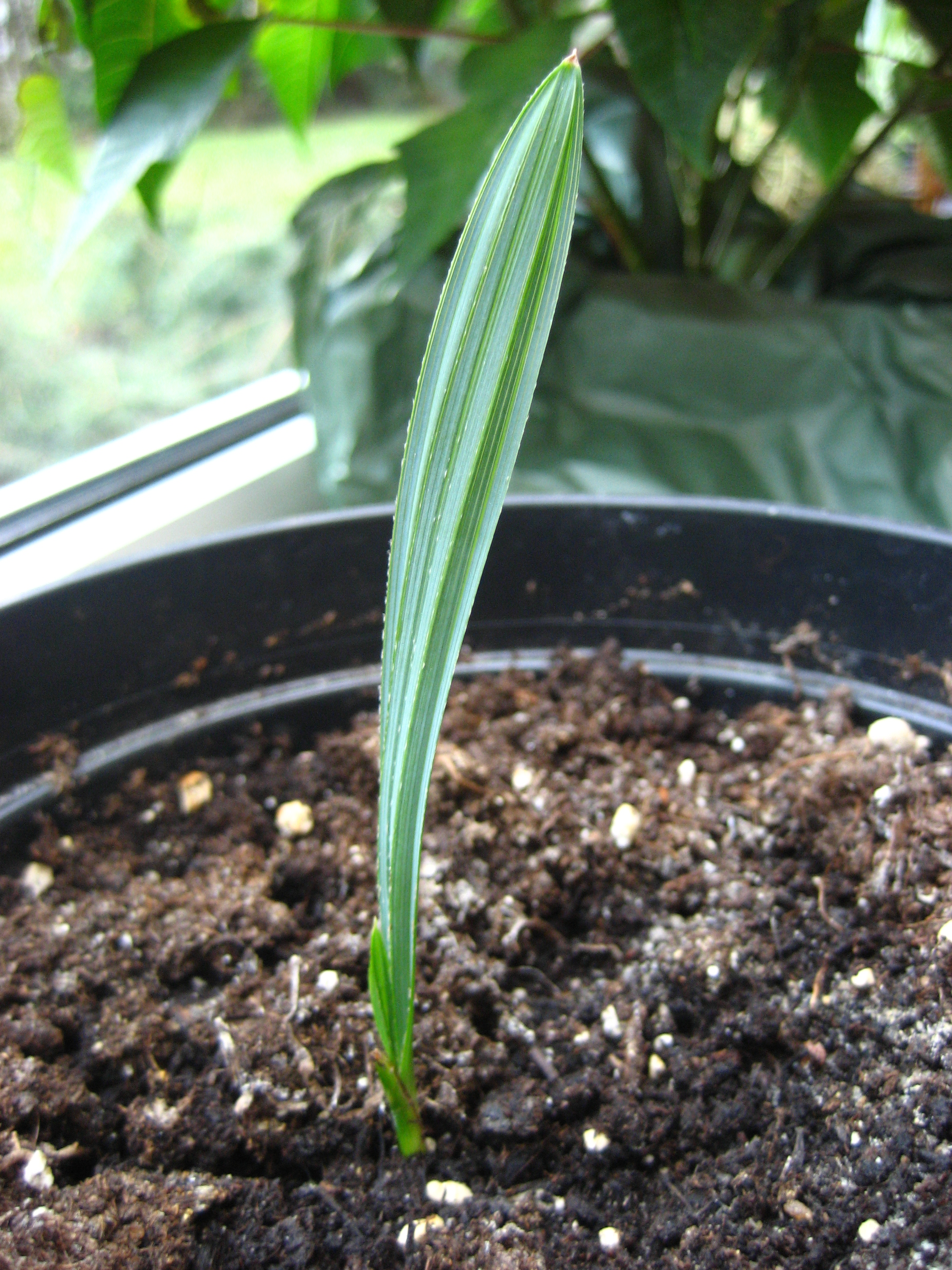
Young Sabal minor seedling

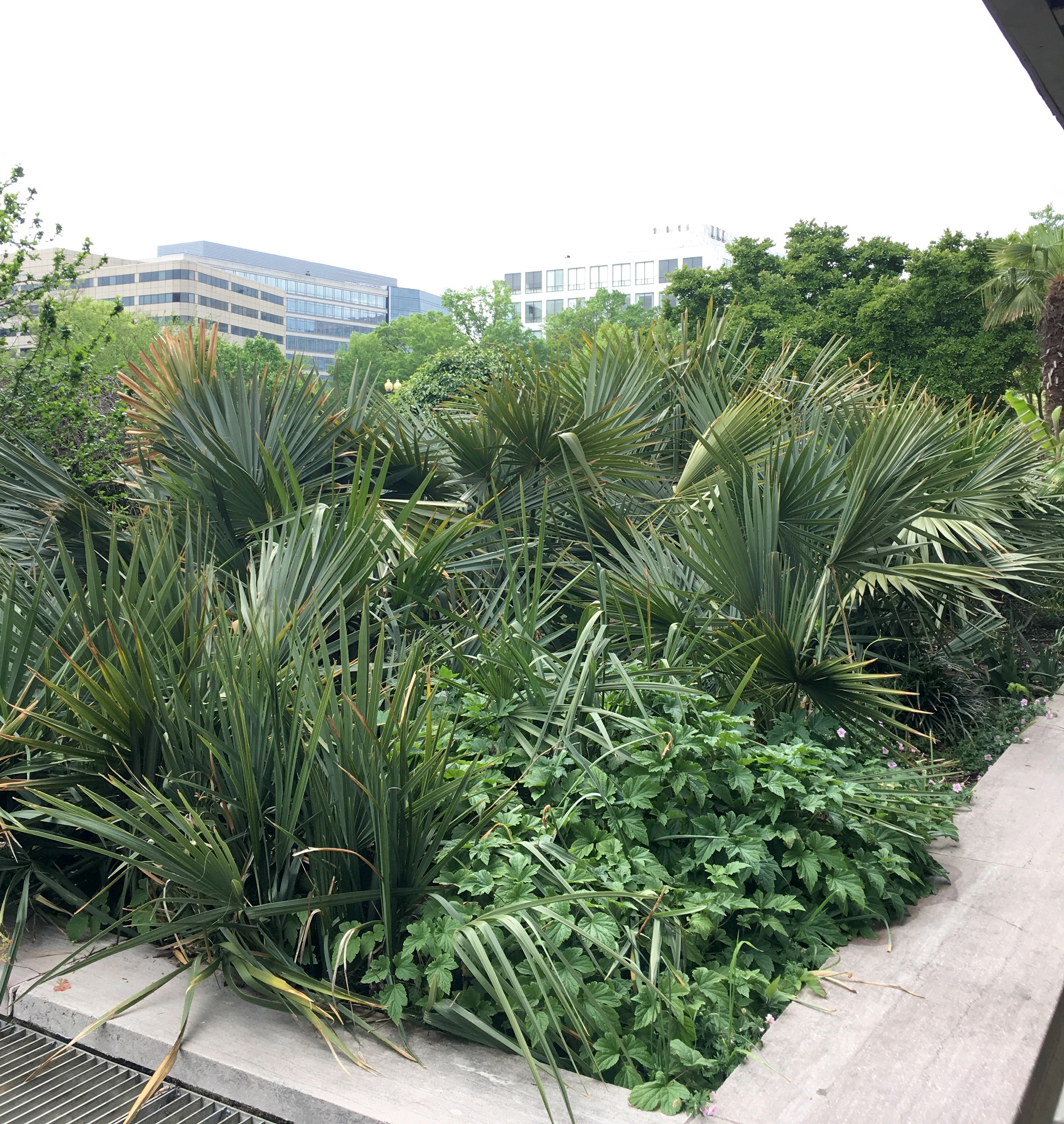
A naturalistic planting of Sabal minor outside the National Air and Space Museum in Washington, D.C.

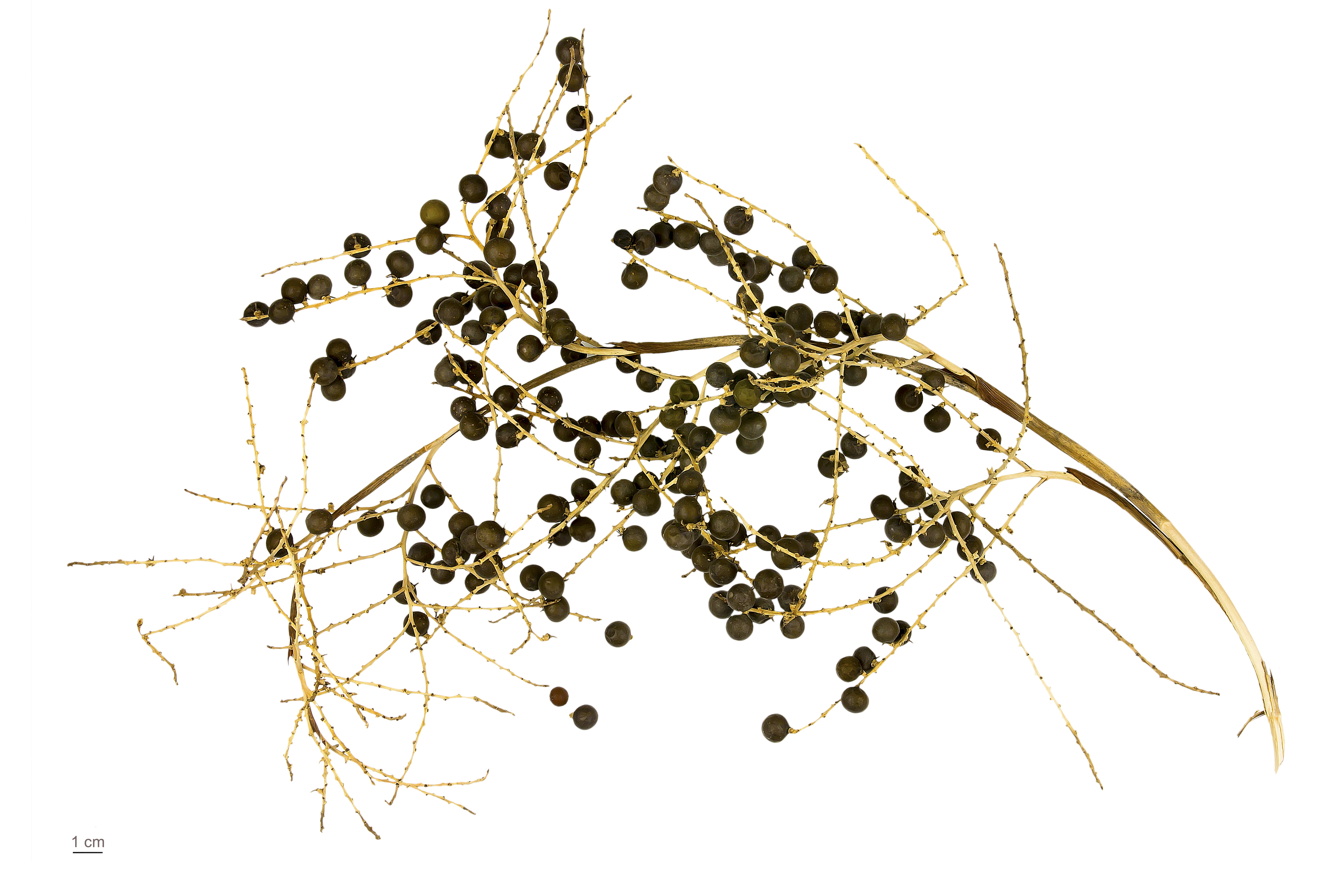
Sabal minor fruit (herbarium specimen, MHNT)
