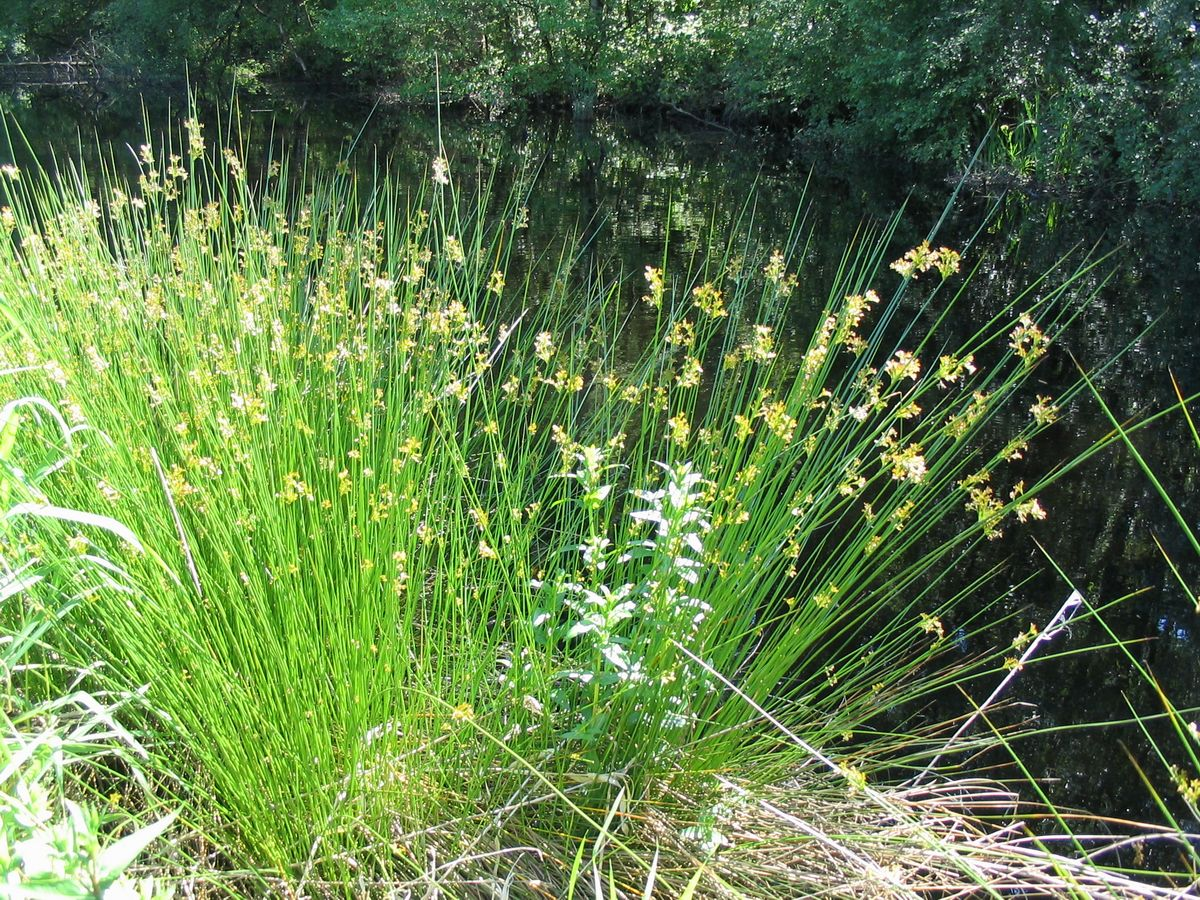

Scientific classification
- Kingdom: Plantae
- Clade: Tracheophytes
- Clade: Angiosperms
- Clade: Monocots
- Clade: Commelinids
- Order: Poales
- Family: Juncaceae
- Genus: Juncus
- Species: J. effusus

Binomial name
- Juncus effusus L.

Synonyms
- List: Juncus communis subsp. effusus (L.) Čelak.; Juncus communis proles effusus (L.) Rouy; Juncus communis var. effusus (L.) E.Mey.; Juncus conglomeratus var. effusus (L.) Kostel.; Juncus laevis Wallr.; Juncus laevis var. effusus (L.) Wallr.; Juncus effusus laxiflorusCout.; Juncus effusus var. oblongicarpus Vayr.

= Juncus effusus =

Species of flowering plant in the rush family

Juncus effusus is a perennial herbaceous flowering plant species in the rush family Juncaceae, with the common names common rush or soft rush.

== Distribution and habitat ==
Juncus effusus has a wide distribution, considered native in Europe, Asia, Africa, Madagascar, North America, and South America. It has naturalized in Australia, New Zealand, South Africa and various oceanic islands.

It grows in wet areas, such as wetlands, riparian areas, and marshes with sandy and peaty substrates. It is common throughout the British Isles by rivers, streams and lakes, in wet heathland and pastures, including purple moor-grass and rush pastures and fen-meadow plant associations.

== Description ==
Juncus effusus grows in large clumps up to about 1.2 metres (3 ft 11 in) tall. The stems are smooth cylinders with light pith filling. The yellowish inflorescence appears to emerge from one side of the stem about 20 centimetres (8 in) from the top. In fact the stem ends there; the top part is the bract, that continues with only a slight colour-band marking it from the stem. The lower leaves are reduced to a brown sheath at the bottom of the stem.

=== Subspecies ===
Five subspecies are currently recognized:

1. Juncus effusus subsp. austrocalifornicus Lint — endemic to California and Baja California.
2. Juncus effusus subsp. effusus — widespread
3. Juncus effusus subsp. laxus (Robyns & Tournay) Snogerup — tropical Africa, Madagascar, Mauritius, Canary Islands, Madeira.
4. Juncus effusus subsp. pacificus (Fernald & Wiegand) Piper & Beattie — Alaska, British Columbia, Washington, Idaho, Oregon, California, Baja California.
5. Juncus effusus subsp. solutus (Fernald & Wiegand) Hämet-Ahti — central and eastern United States.

Juncus effusus can be differentiated from the rarer Juncus pylaei by the number of ridges on the stem. Juncus effusus has 30 to 40 ridges and J. pylaei has 10 to 20.

== Uses ==
=== Wildlife ===
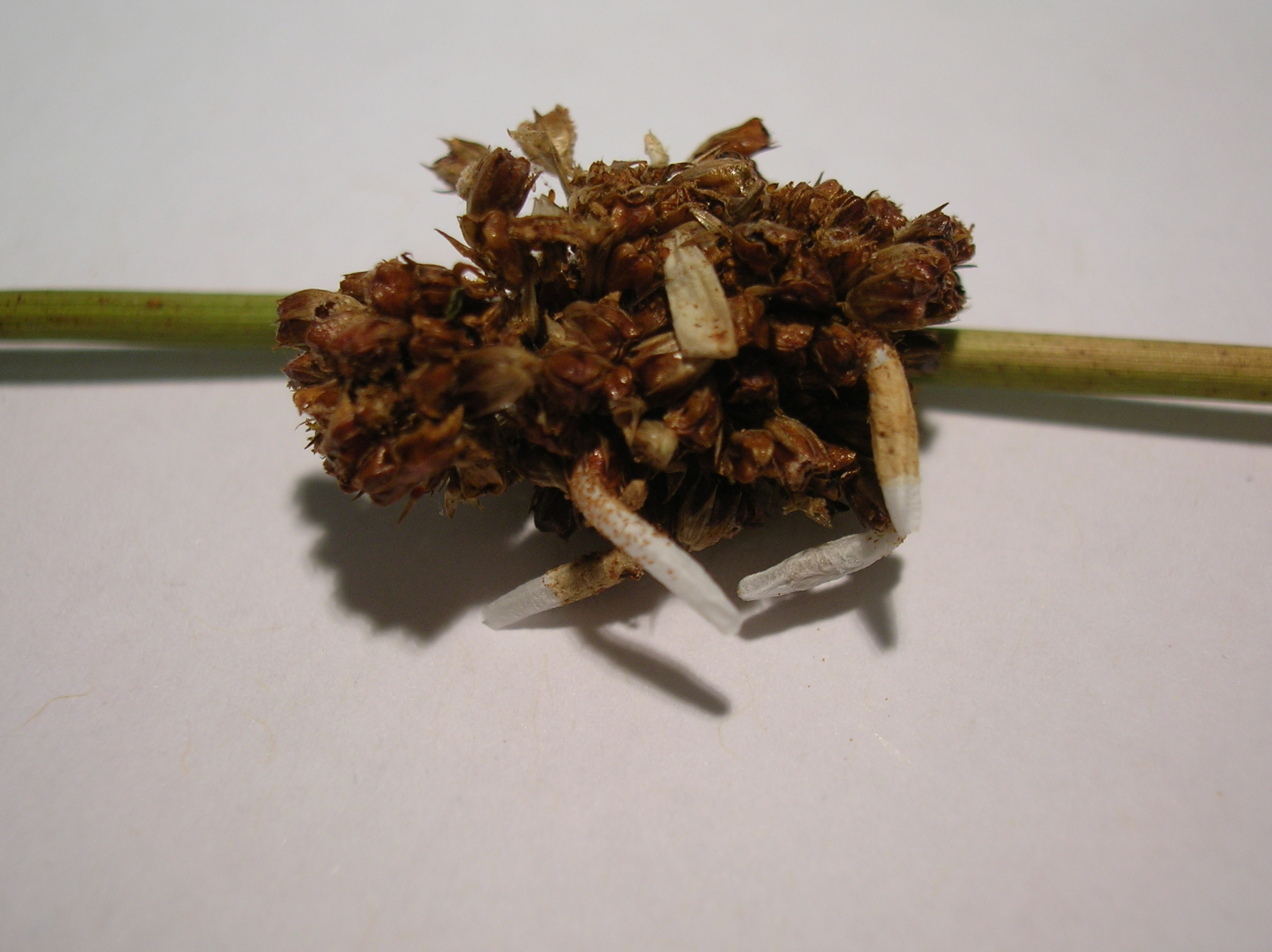
Pupal cases of Coleophora caespitiella on J. effusus

The species provides wildfowl, wader feeding, and nesting habitats, and also habitats for small mammals. The rootstalks are eaten by muskrats, and birds take shelter amongst the plant's stems. A number of invertebrates feed on soft rush, including the rufous minor moth.

=== Humans ===
J. effusus is one of the seven ingredients of hui sup tea (去濕茶). In Japan, this rush is called igusa (藺草) and is grown to be woven into the covering of tatami mats (the filling is rice straw, extruded styrofoam, chip board, or some combination). In Europe, this rush was once used to make rushlights (by soaking the pith in grease), a cheap alternative to candles.

==== Cultivation ====
The species is cultivated as an ornamental plant, for planting in water gardens, native plant and wildlife gardens, and for larger designed natural landscaping and habitat restoration projects.

The cultivar Juncus effusus 'Spiralis' (syn. Juncus spiralis), with the common names corkscrew rush or spiral rush, is a distinctive potted and water garden plant due to its curled spiral like foliage.

== Weed control ==
Juncus effusus can become a naturalized or invasive species, undesirable in rangelands for its unpalatability to livestock. Suggested methods of controlling rushes include: ploughing; high applications of inorganic fertilizer (can pollute watersheds); and topping to prevent seed formation.

== Chemistry ==
Juncusol is a 9,10-dihydrophenanthrene found in J. effusus, which also contains effusol.
