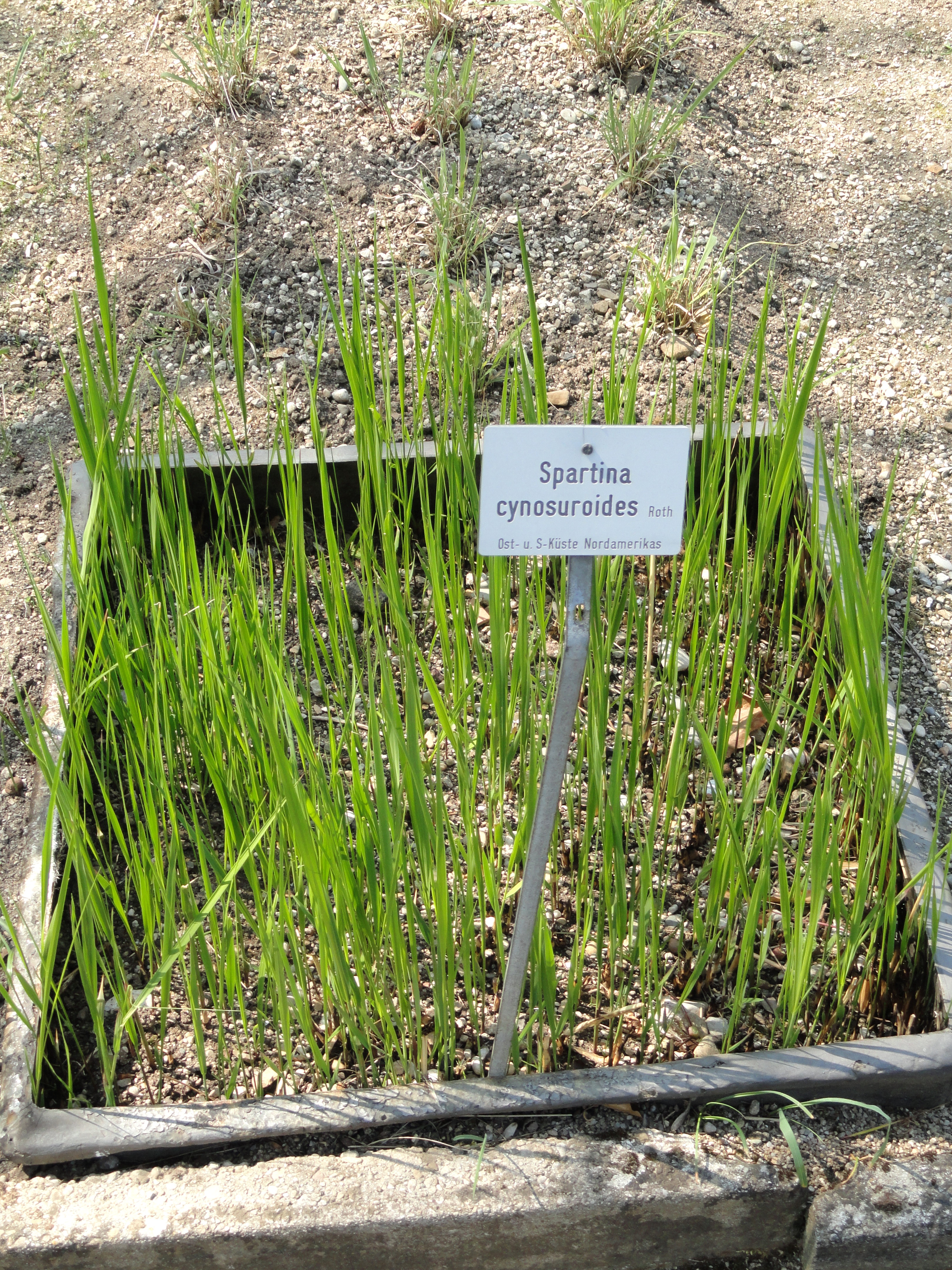
- Botanical garden specimen

Conservation status
- Secure (NatureServe)

Scientific classification
- Kingdom: Plantae
- Clade: Tracheophytes
- Clade: Angiosperms
- Clade: Monocots
- Clade: Commelinids
- Order: Poales
- Family: Poaceae
- Subfamily: Chloridoideae
- Genus: Sporobolus
- Section: Spartina
- Species: S. cynosuroides

Binomial name
- Sporobolus cynosuroides (L.) P.M.Peterson & Saarela

Synonyms
- List: Cynodon cynosuroides (L.) Raspail; Dactylis cynosuroides L.; Limnetis cynosuroides (L.) Rich.; Paspalum cynosuroides (L.) Brot.; Spartina cynosuroides (L.) Roth; Trachynotia cynosuroides (L.) Michx.; Triodia cynosuroides (L.) Spreng.; Limnetis polystachya (Michx.) Rich.; Poa lagopoides Steud.; Spartina cynosuroides var. polystachya (Michx.) Beal; Spartina polystachya (Michx.) Willd.; Trachynotia polystachya Michx.

= Sporobolus cynosuroides =

Species of grass

Sporobolus cynosuroides is a species of grass known by the common names big cordgrass and salt reedgrass. It is native to the East Coast and Gulf Coast of the United States, where it grows in coastal habitat such as marshes, lagoons, and bays.

This species is a rhizomatous perennial grass which can grow up to 10 feet tall. The leaves are up to 24 inches long and up to an inch wide. The ligule is hairy. The stem can be ¾ of an inch in diameter at the base. The inflorescence contains up to 40 spikes each up to 3 inches long.

This grass grows in flooded saline soils such as those in salt marshes. It is associated with marsh-hay cordgrass (Spartina patens) and common reed (Phragmites australis).
