= National Register of Historic Places listings in Randolph County, North Carolina =

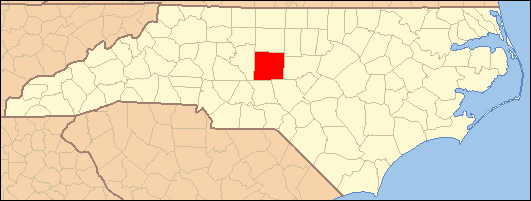

This list includes properties and districts listed on the National Register of Historic Places in Randolph County, North Carolina. Click the "Map of all coordinates" link to the right to view a Google map of all properties and districts with latitude and longitude coordinates in the table below.

== Current listings ==
This National Park Service list is complete through NPS recent listings posted August 7, 2026.

| | Name on the Register | Image | Date listed | Location | City or town | Description |
|---|---|---|---|---|---|---|
| 1 | Acme-McCrary Hosiery Mills | Acme-McCrary Hosiery Mills | August 18, 2014 (#14000496) | 124, 148, 159, and 173 N. Church Sts. 35°42′27″N 79°49′00″W | Asheboro | |
| 2 | Asheboro Downtown Historic District | Asheboro Downtown Historic District | April 14, 2022 (#100007595) | Portions of Church, Fayetteville, Hoover, North, Salisbury, White Oak, and Worth Sts., Sunset Ave. 35°42′21″N 79°48′55″W | Asheboro | |
| 3 | Asheboro Hosiery Mills and Cranford Furniture Company Complex | Asheboro Hosiery Mills and Cranford Furniture Company Complex | December 7, 2011 (#11000891) | 133 and 139 S. Church St. and 230 W. Academy St. 35°42′15″N 79°49′00″W | Asheboro | |
| 4 | Central School | Central School | November 12, 1993 (#93001342) | 414 Watkins St. 35°42′38″N 79°48′14″W | Asheboro | |
| 5 | Coleridge Historic District | Coleridge Historic District | November 13, 1976 (#76001334) | NC 22; 35°38′23″N 79°37′00″W | Coleridge | |
| 6 | Deep River-Columbia Manufacturing Company | Deep River-Columbia Manufacturing Company | November 15, 1978 (#78001970) | Main St. 35°43′48″N 79°39′16″W | Ramseur | Destroyed |
| 7 | William Dennis Pottery Kiln and House Site | | January 22, 2014 (#13001116) | Address Restricted | Randleman | |
| 8 | Franklinville Historic District | Franklinville Historic District | December 20, 1984 (#84000587) | Roughly bounded by Deep River, Sunrise Ave., Clark St., and Greensboro Rd. 35°44′45″N 79°41′51″W | Franklinville | |
| 9 | Moses Hammond House | Moses Hammond House | June 12, 1989 (#89000466) | 118 Trindale Rd. 35°54′51″N 79°58′31″W | Archdale | |
| 10 | Harper House | | July 22, 1979 (#79003347) | Southwest of Archdale; 35°51′36″N 80°00′56″W | Archdale | |
| 11 | Wilson Kindley Farm and Kindley Mine | Wilson Kindley Farm and Kindley Mine | June 11, 1992 (#91001412) | NC 1408, east side, 1 mile north of US 64; 35°44′47″N 79°58′15″W | Asheboro | |
| 12 | Lewis-Thornburg Farm | Lewis-Thornburg Farm | February 24, 2005 (#05000085) | NC 1107, approximately 1.5 miles south of the junction with NC 1170; 35°36′59″N 79°56′41″W | Asheboro | |
| 13 | Liberty Historic District | Liberty Historic District | November 22, 2000 (#00001426) | Roughly along west of Norfolk & Southern Railroad between Butler Ave. and W. Patterson Ave., including the 100 block of W. Swannanoa St. 35°51′23″N 79°34′22″W | Liberty | |
| 14 | Marley House | Marley House | December 18, 1990 (#90001919) | North side of US 64 .1 miles west of the junction with SR 2475; 35°44′39″N 79°33′03″W | Staley | |
| 15 | Mount Shepherd Pottery Site | | February 1, 1980 (#80002895) | Address Restricted | Asheboro | |
| 16 | Pisgah Community Covered Bridge | Pisgah Community Covered Bridge | January 20, 1972 (#72000988) | Southeast of Pisgah on SR 1109 off SR 1112; 35°32′32″N 79°53′38″W | Pisgah | |
| 17 | Randleman Graded School | Randleman Graded School | April 20, 2005 (#05000326) | 130 W. Academy St. 35°49′06″N 79°48′22″W | Randleman | |
| 18 | Randolph County Courthouse | Randolph County Courthouse | May 10, 1979 (#79001746) | Worth St. 35°42′22″N 79°48′48″W | Asheboro | |
| 19 | St. Paul's Methodist Episcopal Church South | St. Paul's Methodist Episcopal Church South | August 14, 2015 (#15000531) | 401 High Point St. 35°49′21″N 79°48′31″W | Randleman | |
| 20 | Skeen's Mill Covered Bridge | | January 20, 1972 (#72000987) | 1.7 miles west of Flint Hill on SR 1406 off SR 1408; 35°45′57″N 79°59′34″W | Flint Hill | Destroyed |
| 21 | Sunset Theater | Sunset Theater | April 20, 2011 (#11000210) | 232, 234, 236 Sunset Ave. 35°42′22″N 79°49′00″W | Asheboro | |
| 22 | Thayer Farm Site (31RD10) | | August 28, 1986 (#86001953) | Indian Creek Dr. 35°46′24″N 79°59′21″W | Asheboro | |

== See also ==
- National Register of Historic Places listings in North Carolina
- List of National Historic Landmarks in North Carolina
