= Randleman =

Randleman may refer to:

- Randleman (surname)
- Randleman, North Carolina, a city
  - Randleman High School
  - Randleman Graded School, a historic school building
  - Randleman Lake, a reservoir
