= Franklinville =

Franklinville may refer to several places in the United States:

- Franklinville, Georgia
- Franklinville, Illinois
- Franklinville, Baltimore County, Maryland
- Franklinville, New Jersey
- Franklinville, New York, a town
  - Franklinville (village), New York, within the town
- Franklinville, North Carolina
  - Franklinville Historic District
- Franklinville, Philadelphia, Pennsylvania, a neighborhood
