= Marmaduke Swaim Robins =

American teacher, lawyer, politician and newspaperman

Speaker of the North Carolina House of Representatives
- In office 1863
- Preceded by: Richard Spaight Donnell
- Succeeded by: William E. Mann

Member of the North Carolina House of Representatives
- In office 1862-1864
- In office 1883-1884

Member of the North Carolina Senate
- In office 1866-1867
- In office 1876-1877
- In office 1885-1888

Personal details
- Born: August 31, 1827 Randolph County, North Carolina
- Died: June 27, 1905 (aged 77) Asheboro, North Carolina

Marmaduke Swaim Robins (August 31, 1827 - June 27, 1905) was a teacher, lawyer, politician and newspaperman in North Carolina. He served as private secretary to North Carolina governor Zebulon Vance and as a state legislator.

== Biography ==
Robins was born August 31, 1827. He started his education in common schools before going on to teach in schools himself. He continued his education earning his university honors degree in 1856 and obtained his law licence the same year. After university he continued to teach at Middleton Academy, Washington, North Carolina, as well as in Franklinville, North Carolina, and Science Hill near the Uwharrie River. When the American Civil War started he stopped teaching and worked as a private secretary for governor Zebulon Baird Vance.

After the war, he started up a law practice that became large and successful, and where he continued to run and work until the illness that eventually killed him stopped him.

Robins was first elected to the North Carolina House of Representatives, then known as the North Carolina State House of Commons, to serve 1862-1864 to represent Randolph County, North Carolina. He next was elected to the North Carolina Senate for the 1866-1867 session representing Alamance County, North Carolina, and Randolph County. He returned to the senate 9 years later represented Moore County, North Carolina, and Randolph County during the 1876-1877 session. Returning to the house in 1883 representing Moore and Randolph counties until 1884. Finally he returned to the senate in 1885 again representing Moore and Randolph counties until 1888.

He was the editor of the Raleigh Conservative newspaper. He founded and edited the Randolph Regulator (which became The Courier-Tribune) in Asheboro in 1876. His law office remains extant and was used by his son Henry Moring Robins who was also a lawyer and served as Asheboro's mayor from 1907 to 1909.

Robins married Annie Moring on July 24, 1878, and together they had four sons.

The University of North Carolina at Chapel Hill Library has a collection of his family papers in its Southern Historical Collection.

Robins died June 27, 1905, after a long battle with cancer.
