= Richard C. Biberstein =

American architect

Richard Carlyle von Biberstein (1 December 1859 - 11 September 1931) was an American architect who designed numerous textile mills. Several of his works are listed on the U.S. National Register of Historic Places.

== Biography ==
He was born on 1 December 1859 in Fredericksburg, Texas to Hermann von Biberstein and Carolina Schuchard. He married Laura Eisfeld Biberstein (1865-1911) and they had a son, Herman von Biberstein (1893-1966). He died on 11 September 1931 in Charlotte, North Carolina.

== Works ==
- Acme-McCrary Hosiery Mills, 124, 148, 159 North & 173 N. Church Sts., Asheboro, North Carolina (Biberstein, Richard C.), NRHP-listed
- Former Nebel Knitting Mill, 101 W. Worthington Ave., Charlotte, North Carolina (Biberstein, Richard C.), NRHP-listed
- Lyerly Full Fashioned Mill, 56 Third St., SE. Hickory, North Carolina (Biberstein, Bowles, Meachem & Reed), NRHP-listed
- Savona Mill, 528 S. Turner St. Charlotte, North Carolina (Biberstein, Richard C.), NRHP-listed
- Southern Asbestos Company Mills, 1000 Seaboard St.. Charlotte, North Carolina (Biberstein, R.C.), NRHP-listed
- One or more works in Spray Industrial Historic District, roughly bounded by Warehouse, Rhode Island, River Dr., Washburn Rd., the Smith River, E. Early Ave., and Church. Eden, North Carolina (Biberstein, R.C.), NRHP-listed
- Belmont Hosiery Mill, 608 S. Main St.. Belmont, North Carolina (Biberstein, Herman V.), NRHP-listed
