= St. Paul's Methodist Episcopal Church South =

Historic church in North Carolina, United States

- U.S. National Register of Historic Places
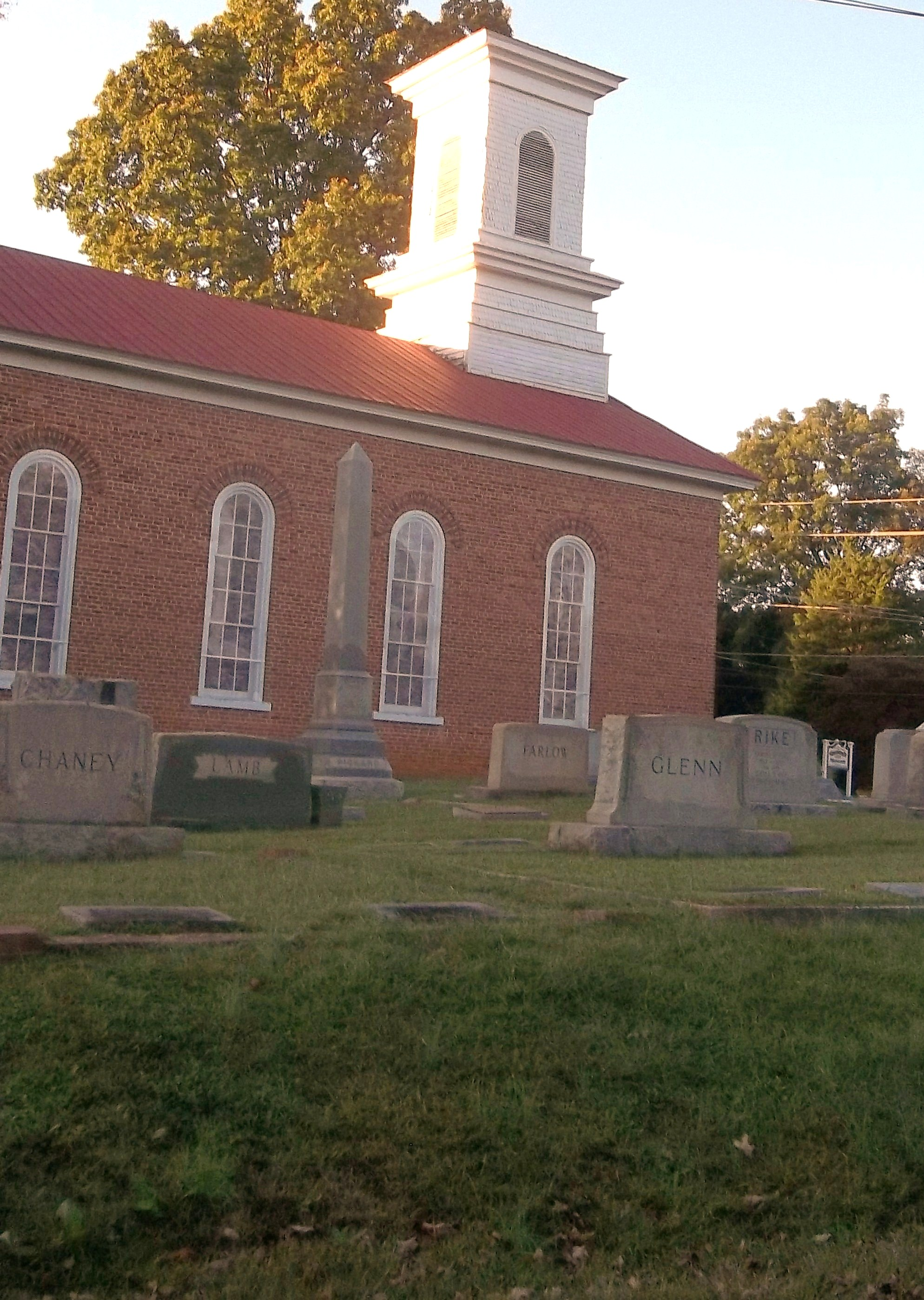

- Location within North Carolina Location within the United States
- Location: 401 High Point St. Randleman, North Carolina
- Coordinates: 35°49′21″N 79°48′31″W
- Area: 1.83 acres (0.74 ha)
- Built: 1879
- Architectural style: Greek Revival; Romanesque; Gothic Revival
- NRHP reference No.: 15000531
- Added to NRHP: August 14, 2015

St. Paul's Methodist Episcopal Church South is a historic church building at 401 High Point Street in Randleman, North Carolina. It is the home of the North Randolph Historical Society, which uses it as its headquarters and refers to it as the St. Paul Museum.

A single-story brick structure, it was the second church built for the community; the first, made of wood, had been built in 1755. It features a front-facing gable roof and a tower set back slightly from the front. The front facade is quite plain, with a central arched opening for the entrance. The gable above is fully pedimented in the Greek Revival style, and is filled with weatherboard siding and a central round louvered opening. The square tower has a belfry with round-arch louvered openings. The church was built in 1879 with funds given by John B. Randleman and John Ferree, prominent local businessmen.

The church is now home to the St. Paul Museum, operated by the North Randolph Historical Society, which focuses on the churche's history and local history.

The church was added to the National Register of Historic Places in 2015.

== See also ==
- National Register of Historic Places listings in Randolph County, North Carolina
