= McCrary Park =

Baseball venue in Asheboro, North Carolina

Coordinates: 35.711375°N 79.829608°W

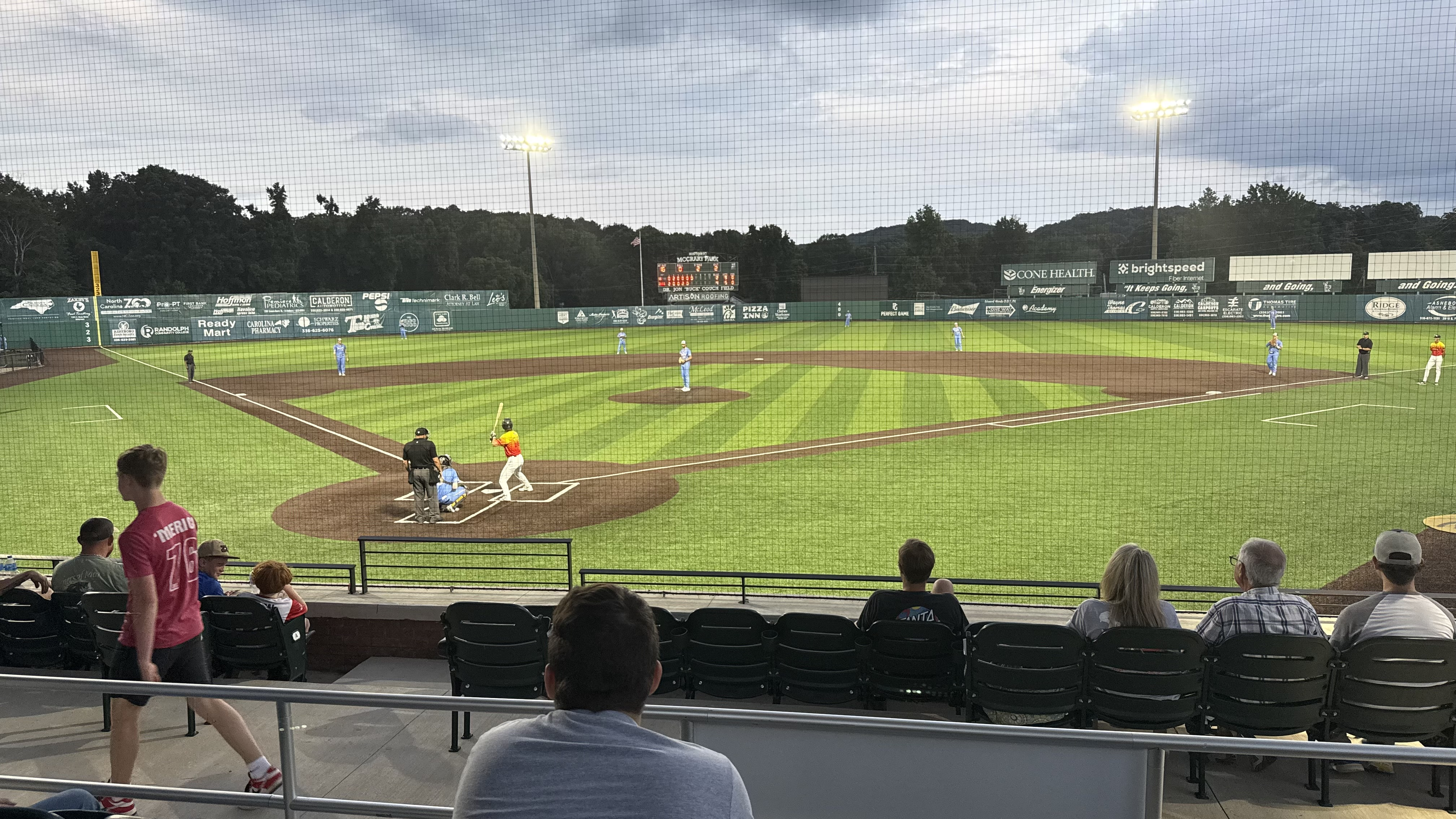
An Asheboro Zookeepers game at McCrary Park in 2025

McCrary Park is a baseball venue in Asheboro, North Carolina, United States. It is home to the Asheboro ZooKeepers of the Coastal Plain League, a collegiate summer baseball league. The park opened in 1946 and has a capacity of 1,400 fans. In addition to the ZooKeepers, the field is the home stadium of American Legion Post 45 and Asheboro High School baseball.

The park's dimensions are 323 ft. down the left field line, 400 ft. to dead center field, and 335 ft. down the right field line.

== History ==
McCrary Park was built in 1946 by the Acme-McCrary Hosiery Mills as a home for the Mills' Industrial League team, the McCrary Eagles. It began hosting the games of Legion Post 45 in the late 1950s.
