= The Courier-Tribune =

Daily newspaper in Asheboro, North Carolina

Coordinates: 35.706870°N 79.820993°W

- Type: Daily newspaper
- Format: Broadsheet
- Owner: Paxton Media Group
- Publisher: Paul Mauney
- General manager: Todd Benz
- Founded: 1876
- Language: American English
- Headquarters: 500 Sunset Ave. Asheboro, North Carolina
- Circulation: 5,789 (as of 2018)
- OCLC number: 13168530
- Website: courier-tribune.com

The Courier-Tribune is the daily newspaper of Asheboro, North Carolina and the surrounding county of Randolph County, North Carolina. It has been published daily, except Saturday, since 1978.

== History ==
The Courier-Tribune is one of the 10 oldest newspapers published in North Carolina, tracing its roots back to 1876 and Marmaduke Swaim Robins Randolph Regulator newspaper. It was named the Courier Tribune in 1940 in the merger of Courier (1930–1940) and Randolph Tribune (1924–1940).

In November 2022 Paxton Media Group acquired The Courier-Tribune and five other North Carolina newspapers from Gannett Co., Inc.

== See also ==
- List of newspapers in North Carolina
