= Asheboro ZooKeepers =

Information
- League: Coastal Plain League (West)
- Location: Asheboro, North Carolina
- Ballpark: McCrary Park
- Founded: 1999
- Division championships: 2013 (2nd Half); 2015 (2nd Half); 2016 (1st Half)
- Former name(s): Asheboro Copperheads
- Colors: Khaki, brown, black, and jungle green
- Ownership: Ronnie Pugh, Doug Pugh, Steve Pugh, Mike Pugh
- President: Kyle Pugh
- General manager: Korey Dunbar
- Coach: Korey Dunbar
- Website: zookeepersbaseball.com

The Asheboro ZooKeepers are an amateur baseball team playing in the Coastal Plain League. The team plays its home games at McCrary Park in Asheboro, North Carolina. The team is named for the North Carolina Zoo, which is in Asheboro. They were previously known as the Asheboro Copperheads until changing their name in 2022.

== History ==
McCrary Park was built in the late 1940s for the McCrary Eagles, a semi-professional team sponsored by the Acme-McCrary Corporation, which is still in existence today manufacturing women's hosiery products. The Eagles disbanded in the mid-1950s and the park subsequently became the home for the local American Legion Post 45 team and the Asheboro High School Blue Comets. In the spring of 2010, McCrary Park received some significant upgrades, including the installation of a state-of-the-art synthetic infield surface.

The Copperheads first started participating in the Coastal Plain League during the 1999 season and in 2000 reached the CPL championship series but lost to Petersburg. They have made the CPL playoffs five of the past six seasons and were the No. 1 seeded team from the West Division in the 2015 league playoffs, although they lost in the opening round series. The Copperheads went 34-22 in 2015, ending the regular season on a five-game winning streak and winning the second half West title before dropping two straight in the post-season. The team placed four players on the mid-season CPL West Division all-star team (SS Ryan Mincher of Penn, C Kyle Hamner of West Florida, OF/C Will Albertson of Catawba, 3B Skyler Geissinger of SIU-Edwardsville and P Micah Wells of Charlotte) and also had four on the post-season All-CPL first and second teams. Albertson and Wells were first-team selections, while Hamner and INF/P Ryan Colombo (Drury) made the second team.

The ZooKeepers earned the league's Organization of the Year Award for the 2013 season when the team set a franchise record with 35 regular season wins. Keith Ritsche, an assistant coach at Winston-Salem State University, an NCAA Division II institution that plays in the CIAA, became the team's field manager just prior to the 2014 season and held that position 2016. Former Copperhead Taylor Bratton, now a coach at Georgia Southwestern University, will become the first player to return as head coach in 2017. Ritsche returned for 2018 and remains for 2019.

Asheboro hosted the CPL Petitt Cup tournament in 2006 and the league's all-star game in 2008.

McCrary Park has also been the site of the American Legion Southeast Regional baseball tournament in early August since 2013 and is scheduled to host the event at least through 2020.

== MLB Alumni ==
- Bill Bray (William & Mary, 2002); pitcher, Cincinnati Reds (2006–2012) now retired
- Dallas McPherson (The Citadel, 1999); 3B/1B, Los Angeles Angels of Anaheim (2004–2007) Florida Marlins (2008) Oakland Athletics (2010) Chicago White Sox (2011) now retired
- Mike Wright (baseball) (East Carolina, 2009); pitcher, Baltimore Orioles (2015–present) currently active
- Trevor Richards (baseball) (Drury, 2015); pitcher, Miami Marlins, Tampa Bay Rays (2019–present) currently active
