= Keith Crisco =

American politician

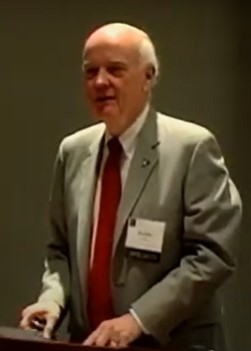
- Crisco at a forum in 2012

North Carolina Secretary of Commerce
- In office 2009–2013
- Governor: Bev Perdue
- Preceded by: Jim Fain
- Succeeded by: Sharon Decker

Personal details
- Born: John Keith Crisco; April 22, 1943 Stanly County, North Carolina
- Died: May 12, 2014 (aged 71) Asheboro, North Carolina
- Party: Democratic
- Education: Pfeiffer University (BA); Harvard University (MBA)

John Keith Crisco Sr. (April 22, 1943 – May 12, 2014) was an American businessman and public official from the State of North Carolina.

== Early life and career ==
Born in 1943 in Stanly County, North Carolina, Crisco graduated from Pfeiffer University with a bachelor's degree and from Harvard University with a Master's of Business Administration. He was then a White House Fellow during the Nixon administration.

In 1978, he moved back to his native North Carolina to become the president of Stedman Elastics, based in Asheboro. Along with other partners, he founded Asheboro Elastics Company in 1986.

== Political career ==
Crisco served on the Asheboro City Schools Board of Education from 1981 to 1987, the Randolph Community College Board from 1993 to 2000 and on the Asheboro City Council from 2003 to 2009.

From 2009 through 2013, he served as Secretary of the North Carolina Department of Commerce. He helped create almost 120,000 jobs and invested over $27 billion into the North Carolina economy.

He also served as a volunteer non-profit board member at Pfeiffer University, where he was also a trustee for over 30 years; and served as Chairman of the Bennett College Board; on the North Carolina Center for Public Policy Research; and in numerous other local and national organizations.

=== North Carolina's 2nd congressional district primary ===
In 2014, he ran for the Democratic nomination for North Carolina's 2nd congressional district in the United States House of Representatives. His main opponent was former American Idol contestant and season 2 runner-up Clay Aiken. The primary was held May 6, and the results were too close to call even a week later, with Crisco on 11,265 votes (39.54%), only narrowly behind Aiken on 11,634 votes (40.83%), who was only just above the 40% necessary to avoid a runoff.

==== Death ====
Though Crisco had initially said he would not concede, he changed his mind and had planned to concede on May 13. However, while both candidates were waiting for the results to be certified on May 13, Crisco died suddenly on May 12, after suffering a fall in his home. He was 71.
