= Southern Asbestos Company Mills =

Historic mill complex in North Carolina, US

- U.S. National Register of Historic Places
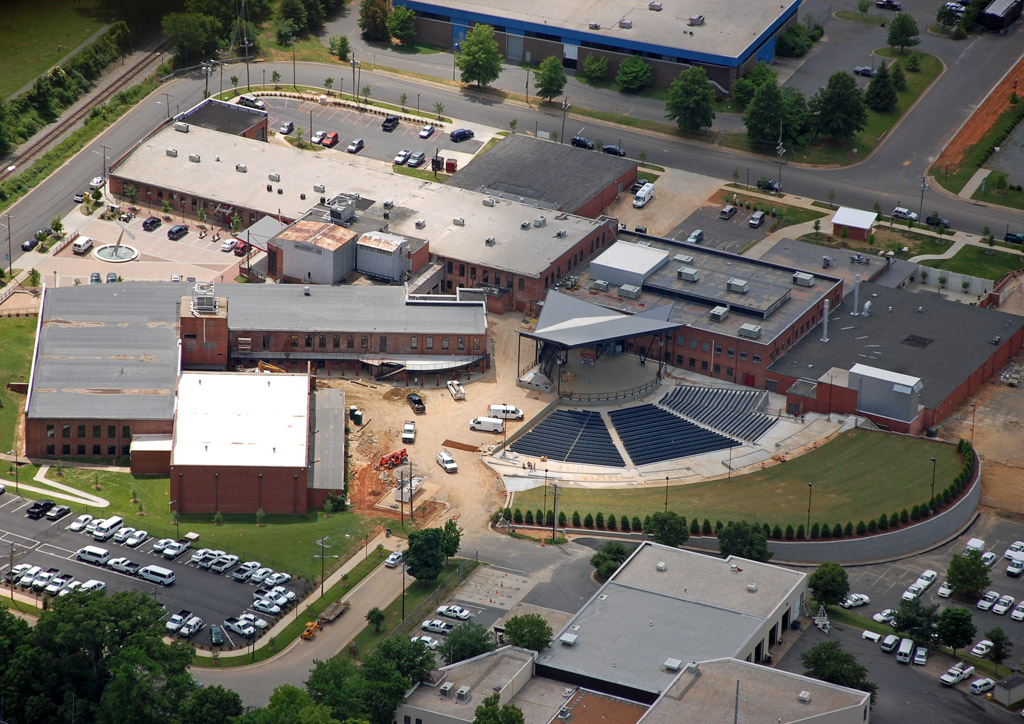
- Southern Asbestos Company Mills, May 2007

- Location within North Carolina Location within the United States
- Location: 1000 Seaboard St., Charlotte, North Carolina
- Coordinates: 35°14′21″N 80°50′41″W
- Area: 7.4 acres (3.0 ha)
- Built: c. 1904-1959
- Architect: Biberstein, R.C.
- Architectural style: Italianate
- NRHP reference No.: 07001500
- Added to NRHP: January 30, 2008

Southern Asbestos Company Mills, also known as Fiber Mills, is a historic asbestos factory complex located in Charlotte, Mecklenburg County, North Carolina. The complex consists of two red brick buildings joined by a bridge section and constructed in phases primarily between 1904 and 1959. During the 1940s and early 1950s, R. C. Biberstein Company made some improvements and designed additions.

It was added to the National Register of Historic Places in 2008.
