= Savona Mill =

Historic mill complex in North Carolina, US

- U.S. National Register of Historic Places
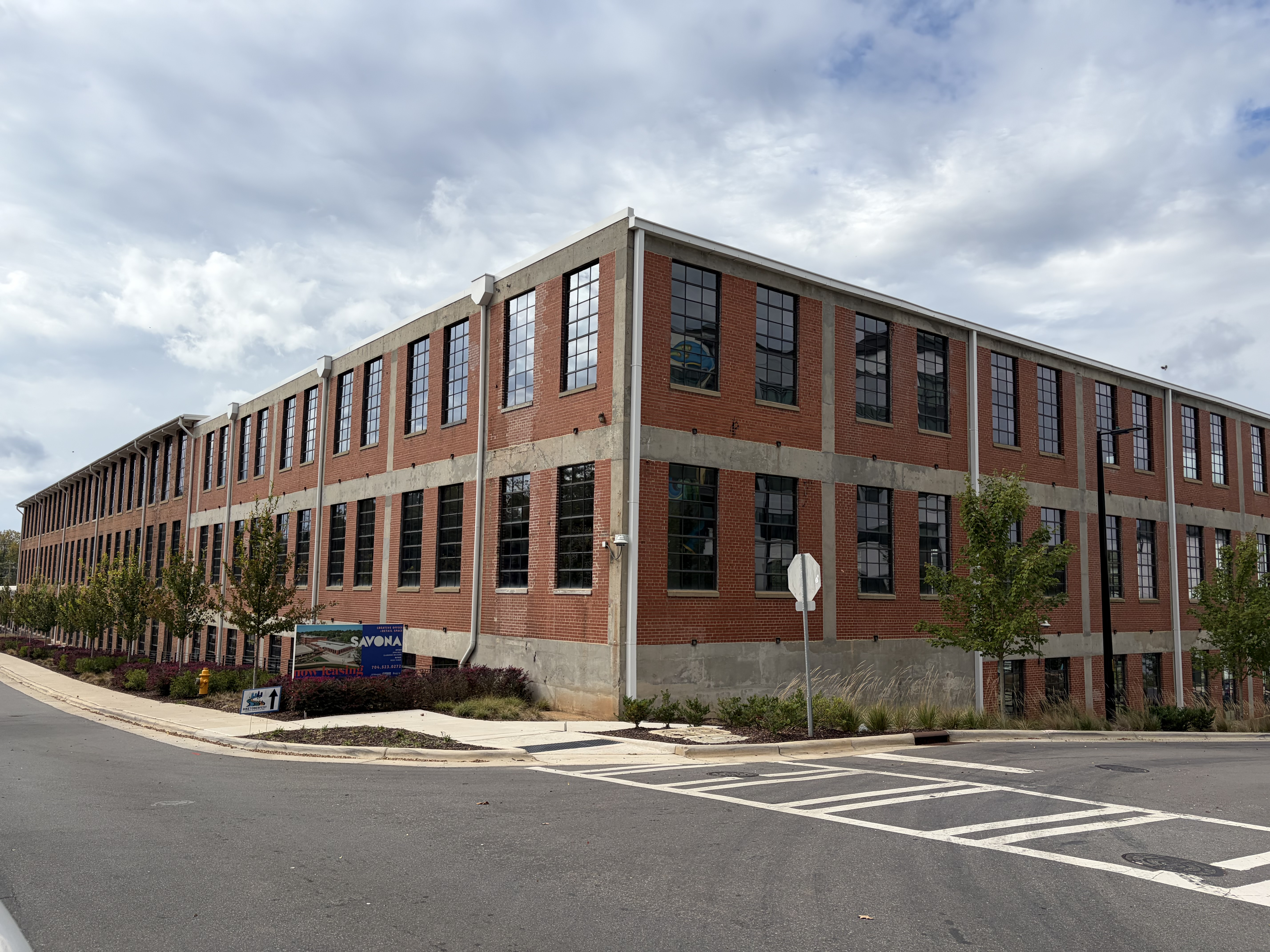
- Savona Mill in 2025.

- Location within North Carolina Location within the United States
- Location: 528 S. Turner St., Charlotte, North Carolina
- Coordinates: 35°14′29″N 80°52′02″W
- Area: 4.18 acres (1.69 ha)
- Built: 1915-1916, 1921, 1951
- Built by: Franklin, R. F.
- Architect: Lockwood Greene & Company; Biberstein, Richard C.
- NRHP reference No.: 14000989
- Added to NRHP: December 2, 2014

Savona Mill, also known as Savona Manufacturing Company, Alfred Cotton Mill, and Old Dominion Box Company, is a historic textile mill located at Charlotte, Mecklenburg County, North Carolina. The building consists of four sections, three of which are historic. They are the 1915-1916 Weave Mill, a one-story rectangular brick building with segmental arched head windows, a low gable roof with exposed beam ends and a wood clerestory monitor roof; the 1921 Spinning Mill, a three-story rectangular brick building with large rectangular steel windows; and the 1951 three-story Paper Warehouse addition. The Weave Mill was designed by Lockwood, Greene & Co.; Richard C. Biberstein designed the Spinning Mill.

It was added to the National Register of Historic Places in 2014.

The property is currently owned by an affiliate of Argos Real Estate Advisors, based in Charlotte, NC, and includes approximately 30 acres and 300,000 total square feet of improvements.
