= Sharon Decker =

American businesswoman and political figure

Sharon Allred Decker

North Carolina Secretary of Commerce
- In office January, 2013 – January 2015
- Preceded by: Keith Crisco
- Succeeded by: John Skvarla

Personal details
- Born: 1957 (age 68–69) Stanly County, North Carolina
- Education: University of North Carolina at Greensboro

Sharon Allred Decker (born 1957) is an American businesswoman and political figure who served as North Carolina Secretary of Commerce under the McCrory Administration. In that role, she was also a member of the North Carolina Cabinet.

== Business career ==
Decker graduated summa cum laude from the University of North Carolina at Greensboro. From 1980 to 1997, Decker served at Duke Energy Corporation (formerly known as Duke Power Company) as Corporate Vice President. Her 18 years tenure with the energy provider included working in areas from marketing and community relations to customer service. She helped establish the creation of Duke Energy's 24-hour customer service center.

In later years, Decker was the founding president of The Lynnwood Foundation, served on the Charlotte Chamber of Commerce and was president of the Doncaster division of Tanner Companies. She was the Charlotte "Woman of the Year" in 1998.

Decker is also a lay pastor in the Presbyterian Church. She and her husband, Bob, have four children.
