= Richard M. Kenan =

American politician

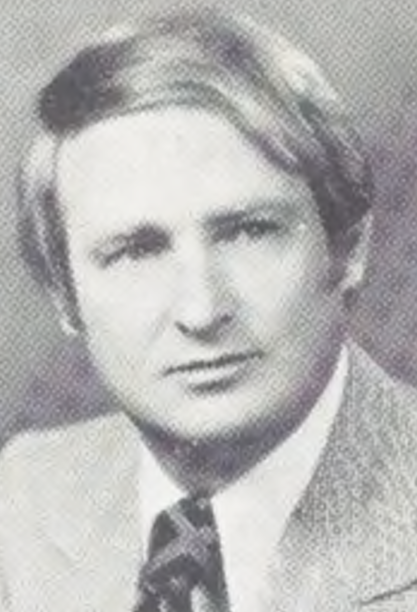
- Kenan in 1975

Member of the South Carolina House of Representatives from the 40th district
- In office 1975–1976
- Preceded by: District established
- Succeeded by: John M. Rucker

Personal details
- Born: Richard Maxwell Kenan; March 10, 1940 Greensboro, North Carolina, U.S.
- Died: December 31, 2020 (aged 80) Chapin, South Carolina, U.S.
- Party: Democratic
- Education: University of North Carolina at Chapel Hill; University of South Carolina

Richard Maxwell Kenan (March 10, 1940 – December 31, 2020) was an American politician. A member of the Democratic Party, he served in the South Carolina House of Representatives from 1975 to 1976.

== Life and career ==
Kenan was born in Greensboro, North Carolina, the son of Judson Glenn and Archel Clifton. He attended Asheboro High School, graduating in 1958. After graduating, he attended the University of North Carolina at Chapel Hill, earning his BS degree in 1962, which after earning his degree, he served in the United States Army. After his discharge, he attended the University of South Carolina, earning his JD degree in 1969.

Kenan served in the South Carolina House of Representatives from 1975 to 1976.

== Death ==
Kenan died on December 31, 2020, in Chapin, South Carolina, at the age of 80.
