= Asheboro High School =

American public school in North Carolina

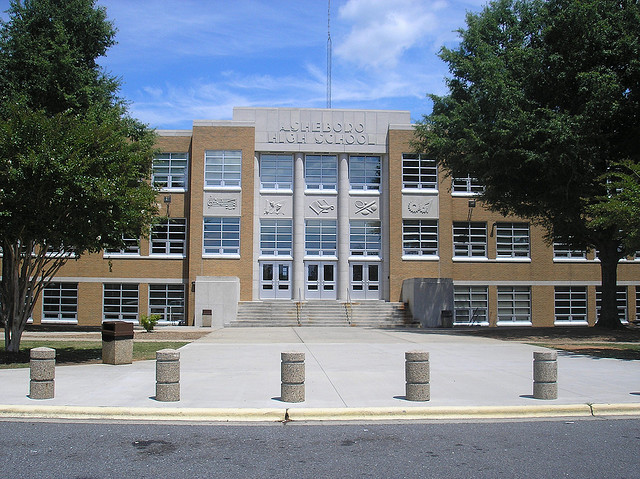
- Asheboro High School in 2011

Location
- 1221 South Park Street; Asheboro, North Carolina 27203; United States; 35°41′23″N 79°49′07″W

Information
- School type: Public
- CEEB code: 340103
- Principal: Ryan Moody
- Teaching staff: 82.10 (FTE)
- Grades: 9–12
- Enrollment: 1,326 (2023-2024)
- Student to teacher ratio: 16.15
- Colors: Royal blue, white
- Mascot: Blue Comet
- Team name: Blue Comets
- Website: www.asheboro.k12.nc.us/highschool_home.aspx

Asheboro High School is a public high school in the Asheboro City Schools system of Asheboro, North Carolina.

== Overview ==
Asheboro High School graduated its first class of three graduates in 1905. In 1950, it moved to its current location on Park Street, where it still stands today. A major addition to the gymnasium was made in 1980 and further renovations made in the early 1990s. The recent annexation of the Sir Robert Motel has expanded space for classes (nicknamed the Comet Corner). The high school has recently expanded to an off-site campus for around 100 students at the North Carolina Zoo. Asheboro underwent another expansion project that was completed in May 2020.

Asheboro High School is the only high school in the Asheboro City Schools District. The student body consists of approximately 1,300 students.

In 2021, the school received criticism for denying a student their diploma for violating the graduation dress code during a graduation ceremony.

== Athletics ==
Asheboro is a member of the North Carolina High School Athletic Association (NCHSAA) and are classified as a 6A school. The school is a member of the TAAC Six 5A/6A Confernece. Asheboro's school mascot is the Blue Comet.

== Notable alumni ==
- Lane Caudell, actor and singer-songwriter
- Nick Coe, professional football player
- Stuart Couch, American lawyer, veteran, and immigration judge
- Randy Henderson, former mayor of Fort Myers, Florida
- Richard M. Kenan, member of the South Carolina House of Representatives
- Elizabeth Lail, actress in Dead of Summer, You, and Once Upon a Time
- Red O'Quinn, professional football player, member of the Canadian Football Hall of Fame
- Joe Spinks, professional basketball player
