= Mount Shepherd Pottery Site =

- U.S. National Register of Historic Places
- Nearest city: Asheboro, North Carolina
- Area: 5.5 acres (2.2 ha)
- NRHP reference No.: 80002895
- Added to NRHP: February 1, 1980

The Mount Shepherd Pottery Site is a historic archaeological site on the grounds of the Mount Shepherd Retreat Center, outside Asheboro, North Carolina. The site is that of a late 18th-century pottery, possibly of Moravian origin. The principal feature of the site is a five-flued circular kiln, and it was accompanied by numerous pottery fragments and items, including stove tiles, slipware, earthenware, and smoking pipes. The site has been associated with Moravian master potter Gottfried Aust.

The site was listed on the National Register of Historic Places in 1980.

== See also ==
- National Register of Historic Places listings in Randolph County, North Carolina
