= Nick Coe =

American gridiron football player (born 1997)

Profile
- Position: Defensive line

Personal information
- Born: August 12, 1997 (age 29); Asheboro, North Carolina, U.S.
- Listed height: 6 ft 5 in (1.96 m)
- Listed weight: 291 lb (132 kg)

Career information
- High school: Asheboro
- College: Auburn (2016–2019)
- NFL draft: 2020: undrafted

Career history
- New England Patriots (2020)*; Miami Dolphins (2020–2021)*; Saskatchewan Roughriders (2021–2022)*; Edmonton Elks (2022); Orlando Guardians (2023); Orlando Predators (2024)*; Fundidores de Monterrey (2024); Osos de Monterrey (2025)
- * Offseason or practice squad member only
- Stats at Pro Football Reference

Nicholas Coe (born August 12, 1997) is an American professional football defensive lineman. He signed as an undrafted free agent with the New England Patriots in May 2020 before being waived in August, and signing to the Miami Dolphins practice squad for the 2020–21 season. Coe played college football at Auburn.

== High school ==
Coe attended Asheboro High School in Asheboro, North Carolina. Coe was a three-sport athlete in football, wrestling, and track. In football, he was first-team All-State and ranked among the top 12 prospects in the state by 247Sports and Rivals. In wrestling, he was a two-time NCHSAA 3A 285-pound state champion and placed at the state tournament all four years. Coe was also honored as the 2015–16 NCHSAA Male Athlete of the Year.

== College ==
Coe was a member of the Auburn Tigers for four seasons, redshirting as a true freshman. As a sophomore, Nick finished with seven sacks and 13.5 tackles for loss. As a junior, he had with 15 total tackles. After Coe's junior season, he announced that he would forgo his senior year and skip the 2020 Outback Bowl.

== Professional career ==
Pre-draft measurables
Height	Weight	Arm length	Hand span	40-yard dash	10-yard split	20-yard split	20-yard shuttle	Three-cone drill	Vertical jump	Broad jump	Bench press
6 ft 4 5/8 in (1.95 m)	280 lb (127 kg)	33 3/4 in (0.86 m)	10 1/4 in (0.26 m)	4.89 s	1.66 s	2.90 s	4.59 s	7.29 s	29.0 in (0.74 m)	9 ft 8 in (2.95 m)	21 reps
All values from NFL Combine/Pro Day

Coe participated in the 2020 NFL Scouting Combine. He went undrafted despite being considered a mid-to-late round prospect for the 2020 NFL draft.

=== New England Patriots ===
Coe was signed by the New England Patriots as an undrafted free agent on May 5, 2020. He was waived by the Patriots on August 13, 2020.

=== Miami Dolphins ===
Coe had a tryout with the Miami Dolphins on August 20, 2020. He was signed to their practice squad on September 7, 2020. He signed a reserve/future contract with the Dolphins on January 5, 2021. Coe was waived by the Dolphins on July 23, 2021.

=== Saskatchewan Roughriders ===
Coe signed with the Saskatchewan Roughriders of the Canadian Football League (CFL) on September 23, 2021. He was released on June 5, 2022.

=== Edmonton Elks ===
The Edmonton Elks announced the signing of Coe to their practice roster on June 21, 2022.

=== Orlando Guardians ===
On November 17, 2022, Coe was drafted by the Orlando Guardians of the XFL. The Guardians folded when the XFL and USFL merged to create the United Football League (UFL).

=== Orlando Predators ===
Coe signed with the Orlando Predators on February 19, 2024. He was not listed on their active roster to begin the season.

=== Fundidores de Monterrey / Osos de Monterrey ===
Coe joined the Fundidores de Monterrey of the Liga de Fútbol Americano Profesional (LFA) for the 2024 LFA season, recording two sacks. He returned to the team in 2025, rebranded as the Osos de Monterrey, and tallied 18 total tackles (including 15 solo and two for loss) and one sack.
