= North Carolina Department of Commerce =

North Carolina Department of Commerce (NCDOC)
- Logo of the North Carolina Department of Commerce

Agency overview
- Formed: 1971
- Headquarters: 301 North Wilmington Street, Raleigh, North Carolina
- Agency executive: Secretary Lee Lilley
- Website: www.commerce.nc.gov

The North Carolina Department of Commerce was formed in 1971 by the North Carolina State Government Reorganization Act. The department is headed by the Secretary of Commerce, who is appointed by the Governor of North Carolina. The Secretary is part of the Governor's Cabinet. The chief function of the department is to connect businesses with locations, workforce and infrastructure in North Carolina that businesses need to succeed. The department also connects local communities with grants and funding sources to attract new business to North Carolina. The department also staffs and receives policy guidance from: the North Carolina Board of Science, Technology, and Innovation; the NCWorks Commission; and the Rural Infrastructure Authority.

== History ==
The North Carolina Department of Commerce was created in 1971 by the North Carolina State Government Reorganization Act, specifically General Statute 143B, Article 10, Paragraph 143B-427:

"There is hereby recreated and reconstituted a Department to be known as the Department of Commerce, with the organization, powers, and duties defined in Article 1 of this Chapter, except as modified in this Article."

The Reorganization Act was part of an effort to reduce the number of state organizations and improve efficiency in government. The Department of Commerce is headed by the Secretary, who is selected by the Governor, and serves during the governor's tenure. The Secretary is one of the members of the Governor's Cabinet.

The department was activated as a functional agency on January 25, 1972. In its early history, the Department was simply an administrative umbrella providing support for a number of different regulatory agencies, each of which exercised its authority independently. In 1977, the North Carolina General Assembly transferred the state Division of Economic Development from the Natural/Economic Resources department into the Commerce department, among other changes.

== Secretaries ==
The Secretaries of the Department of Commerce have included:

Secretary	Term	Governor
George Irving Aldridge	1972–1973	Robert W. Scott
Tenney I. Deane, Jr.	1973–1974	James Holshouser
Winfield S. Harvey	1973–1976	James Holshouser
Donald R. Beason	1976–1977	James Holshouser
Lauch Faircloth	1977–1985	Jim Hunt
Howard Haworth	1985–1987	James G. Martin
Claude E. Pope	1987–1989	James G. Martin
Jim Broyhill	1989–1990	James G. Martin
Estell C. Lee	1990–1993	James G. Martin
S. Davis Phillips	1993–1997	Jim Hunt
E. Norris Tolson	1997–1998	Jim Hunt
Rick Carlisle	1998–2001	Jim Hunt
James T. Fain, III	2001–2009	Mike Easley
John Keith Crisco	2009–2013	Bev Perdue
Sharon Decker	2013–2015	Pat McCrory
John E. Skvarla, III	2015–2017	Pat McCory
Anthony M. "Tony" Copeland	2017–2021	Roy Cooper
Machelle Baker Sanders	2021-2025	Roy Cooper
Lee Lilley	2025-present	Josh Stein

== Included organizations ==
The following state organizations are included in the Department of Commerce:

- Banking Commission
- Credit Union Division
- Division of Employment Security (formerly the Employment Security Commission)
- Division of Workforce Solutions (which supports the network of NCWorks Career Centers)
- Industrial Commission
- Labor & Economic Analysis Division
- Marine Industrial Park Authority
- Public Staff of the Utilities Commission
- Rural Electrification Authority
- State Savings and Loan Commission
- Travel & Tourism Board
- North Carolina Utilities Commission
