= Thayer Farm Site =

- Thayer Farm Site (31RD10)
- U.S. National Register of Historic Places
- Nearest city: Asheboro, North Carolina
- Area: 2 acres (0.81 ha)
- NRHP reference No.: 86001953
- Added to NRHP: August 28, 1986

The Thayer Farm Site, designated by the Smithsonian trinomial 31RD10, is a prehistoric archaeological site in Randolph County, North Carolina. The site, long known to local collectors for surface level finds, was formally investigated in 1984, and was found to consist of a stratified series of deposits bearing evidence of occupation between about 1200 and 1700 AD. Finds at the site include pottery fragments, projectile points, animal bone, shell fragments, and human bone, the latter indicating the presence of burials. Two acres of the site were donated to the Historic Preservation Foundation for North Carolina in 1985.

The site was listed on the National Register of Historic Places in 1986.

== See also ==
- National Register of Historic Places listings in Randolph County, North Carolina
