= Randleman (surname) =

Randleman is a surname. Notable people with the surname include:

- Kevin Randleman (1971–2016), American mixed martial arts fighter and wrestler
- Ron Randleman (born 1941), American football coach
- Shirley B. Randleman (born 1950), American politician
