= Marley House =

Historic house in North Carolina, United States

- U.S. National Register of Historic Places
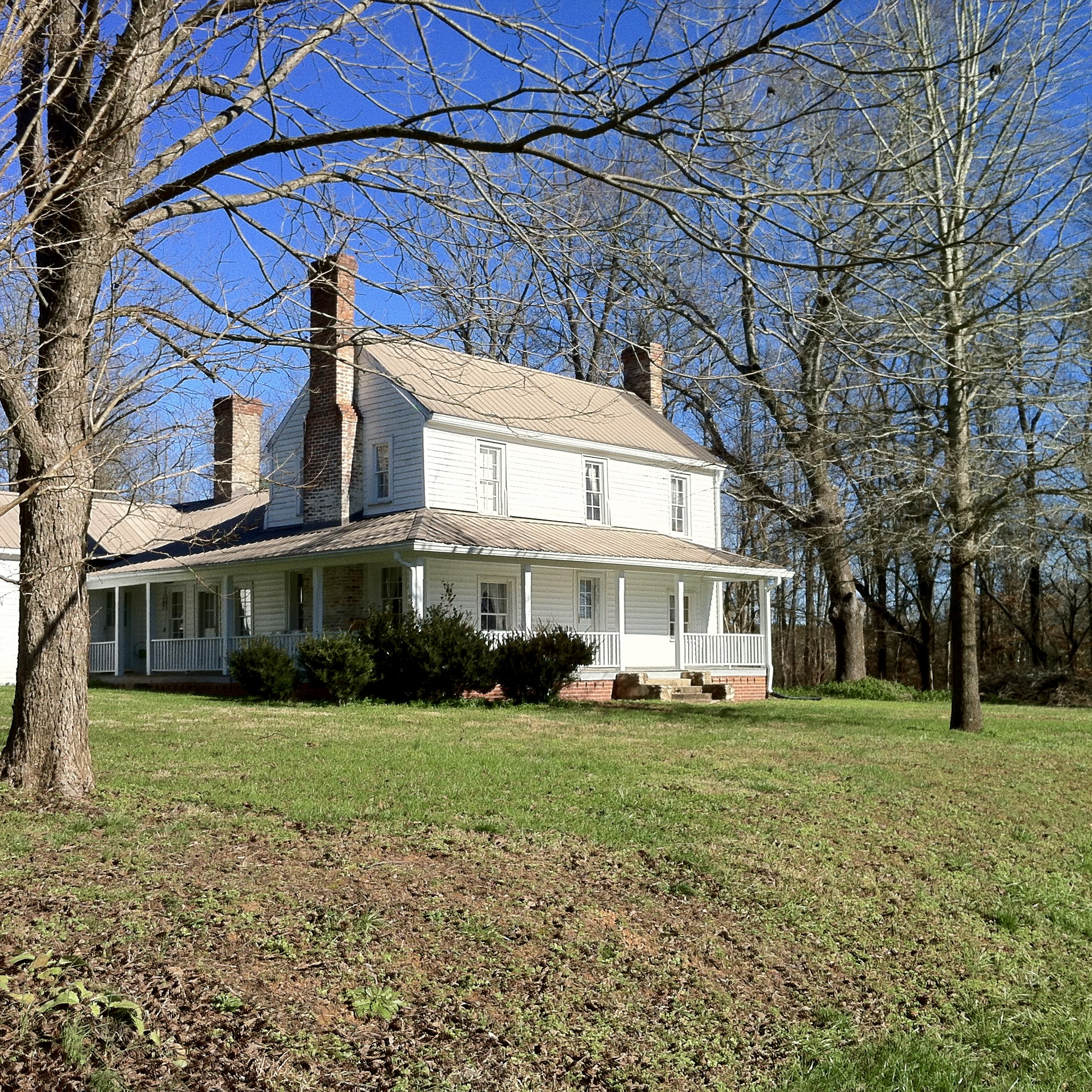
- The Marley House in 2016

- Location within North Carolina Location within the United States
- Location: North side of US 64 .1 miles west of the junction with SR 2475, near Staley, North Carolina
- Coordinates: 35°44′39″N 79°33′03″W
- Area: 12 acres (4.9 ha)
- Built: c. 1816
- Architectural style: Log & frame hall & parlor
- NRHP reference No.: 90001919
- Added to NRHP: December 18, 1990

The Marley House is a historic homestead located near Staley, Randolph County, North Carolina. The house dates to about 1816, and is a two-story vernacular dwelling of frame and log construction. A one-story, gable-roofed frame rear wing was added in the 1840s or 1850s, then enlarged about 1920. Also on the property are the contributing well house (c. 1880), garage (c. 1920), smokehouse and woodshed (c. 1920), livestock barn (c. 1910–1920), and Marley's Mill Dam (c. 1790).

It was added to the National Register of Historic Places in 1990.
