= Lewis–Thornburg Farm =

Historic farm in North Carolina, United States

- U.S. National Register of Historic Places
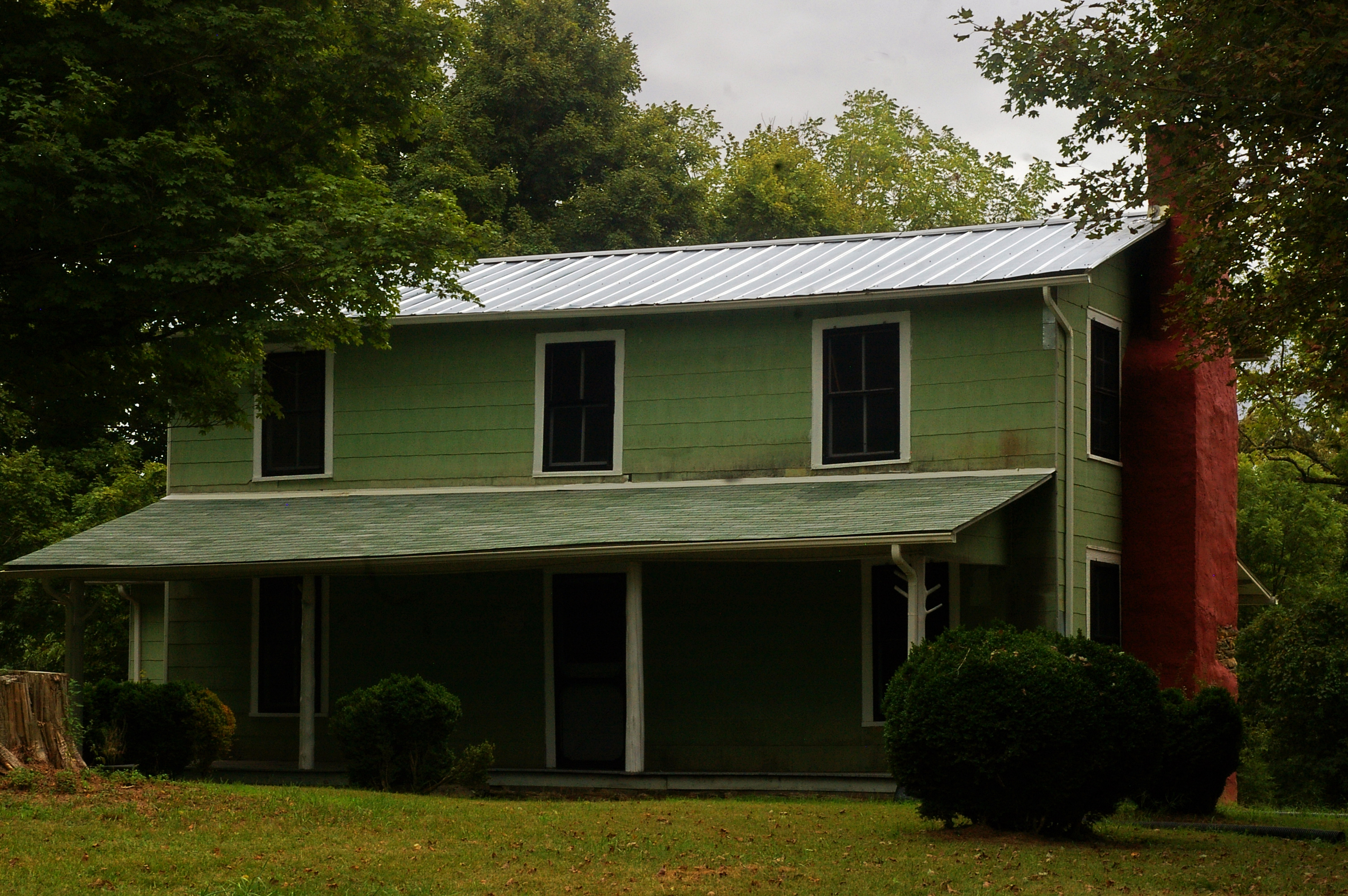
- Lewis–Thornburg House, September 2014

- Location within North Carolina Location within the United States
- Nearest city: NC 1107, approximately 1.5 miles south of the junction with NC 1170, near Asheboro, North Carolina
- Coordinates: 35°36′59″N 79°56′41″W
- Area: 160.8 acres (65.1 ha)
- Built: c. 1855-1950
- Architectural style: Center-passage single pile
- NRHP reference No.: 05000085
- Added to NRHP: February 24, 2005

Lewis–Thornburg Farm, also known as the Thornburg Farm, is a historic home and farm complex near Asheboro, Randolph County, North Carolina.

The farmhouse was built about 1855, and is a two-story, single-pile, three-bay, frame dwelling. It has a gable roof and a two-story rear ell, a one-story rear kitchen wing and a one-story enclosed rear porch. Other contributing resources are two grape arbors (c. 1950), a smokehouse (c. 1920), an equipment shed/garage (c. 1930), an outhouse (c. 1930), five chicken houses (c. 1930, c. 1950), a dog house and pen (c. 1950), pigeon boxes (c. 1950), two equipment sheds (c. 1950), a storage shed, a barn (c. 1900, c. 1950), a tack shed (c. 1950), a carriage house (c. 1900), a three-board fence (c. 1950), an animal chute (c. 1950), a hog shelter (c. 1950), a wood shed (c. 1950), a hog house (c. 1950), and the agricultural landscape.

It was added to the National Register of Historic Places in 2005.
