= Central School (Asheboro, North Carolina) =

Historic school building in North Carolina, United States

- U.S. National Register of Historic Places
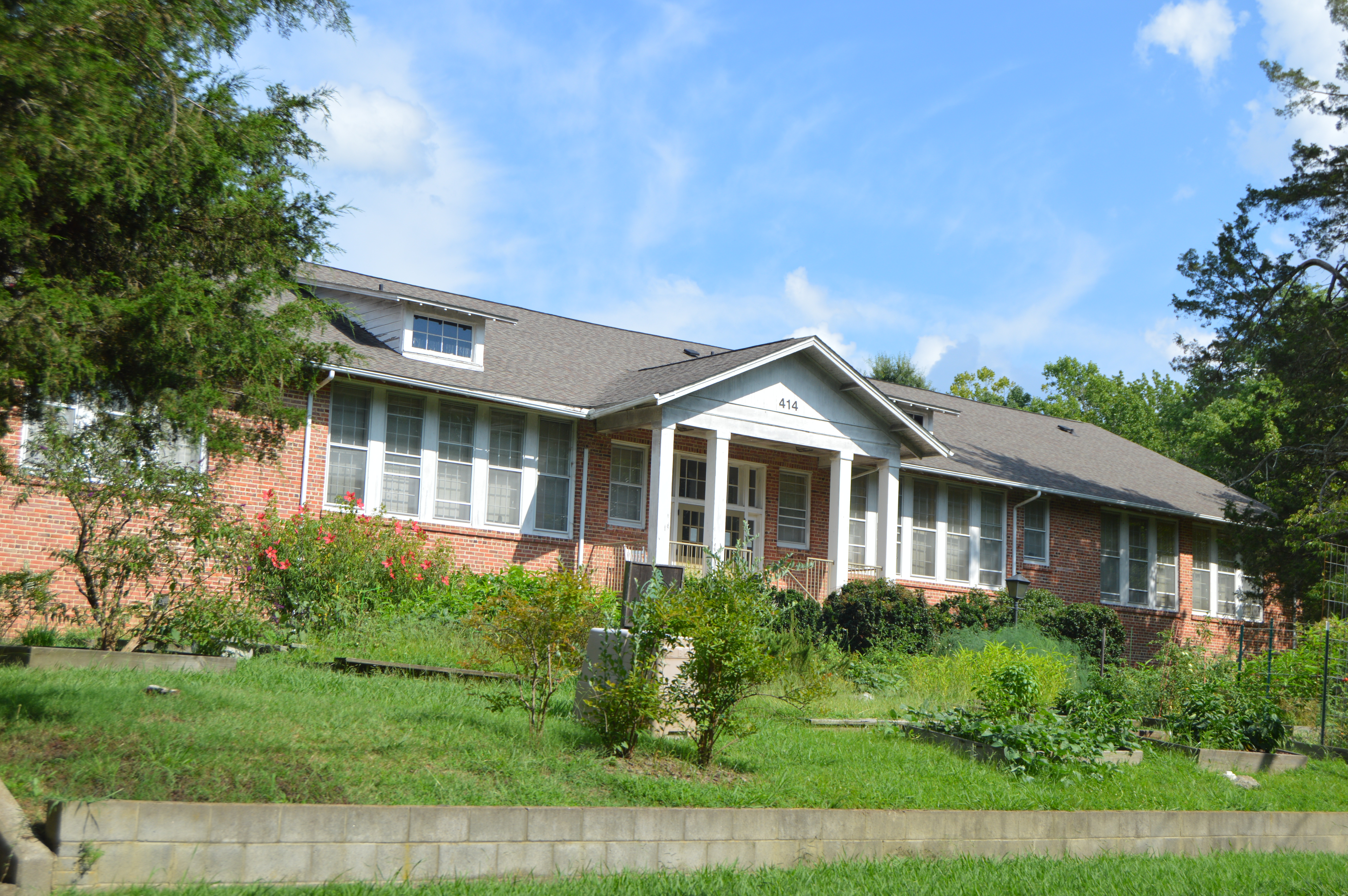
- Facade

- Location within North Carolina Location within the United States
- Location: 414 Watkins St., Asheboro, North Carolina
- Coordinates: 35°42′38″N 79°48′14″W
- Area: 2 acres (0.81 ha)
- Built: 1926, 1948
- Architectural style: International Style, Scholastic functionalism
- NRHP reference No.: 93001342
- Added to NRHP: November 12, 1993

The Central School is a historic Rosenwald School building located in the historically African-American East Side neighborhood at Asheboro, Randolph County, North Carolina. It was built in 1926, and is a one-story, "T"-plan red brick building with a gable roof. In 1948, a two-level, flat roofed International Style wing was added.

It was added to the National Register of Historic Places in 1993.

Asheboro Central High School was a school for African Americans in Asheboro, North Carolina.
