= Asheboro City Schools =

School district in North Carolina, United States

Address
- 1126 S Park Street Asheboro, North Carolina; United States
- Coordinates: 35°41′28″N 79°49′14″W

District information
- Grades: PreK-12
- Established: 1905; 121 years ago
- Superintendent: Dr. Aaron Woody
- Asst. superintendent(s): Dr. Wendy Rich
- NCES District ID: 3700240

Students and staff
- Enrollment: 4,407 (2024-2025)
- Staff: 544 (on an FTE basis)
- Student–teacher ratio: 13.81

Other information
- Website: www.asheboro.k12.nc.us

Asheboro City Schools is located in Asheboro, North Carolina, United States.

The district includes a central portion of Randolph County, including the majority of Asheboro and some unincorporated areas.

== District information ==
- 4,407 students
- 544 staff
- Five elementary schools
- Two middle schools
- One high school
- One additional site that houses the Early Childhood Development Center

=== Student demographics ===
- White 26%
- Black 15%
- Hispanic 52%
- Asian 1%
- Multi-racial 6%
- American Indian Less than 1%

Statistics accurate as of February 2025

== Member Schools ==
- Asheboro High School
- South Asheboro Middle School
- North Asheboro Middle School
- Guy B. Teachey Elementary School
- Lindley Park Elementary School
- Charles W. McCrary Elementary School
- Donna Lee Loflin Elementary School
- Balfour Elementary School

== Central Office Administration and Staff ==
- Dr. Aaron Woody, Superintendent
- Dr. Wendy Rich, Chief Academic Officer/Assistant Superintendent
- Gayle Higgs, Chief of Human Resources & Support Services
- Sandra Spivey, Chief Financial Officer/Facilities
- Anthony Woodyard, Chief Information Officer
- Jody Cox, Director of Maintenance and Facilities
- Sarah Beth Cox, Director of Career & Technical Education
- Melvin Diggs, Director of EC Services
- Dr. Ana Floyd, Director of School Improvement and Professional Development
- Michelle Harger, Director of Support Services/District Athletic Director
- Christina Kinley, Director of Accountability & Student Information
- Chandra Manning, Director of Communications & Talent Development
- Deanna Wiles, Director of K-12 Curriculum & Instruction

== Board of Education ==
- Gidget Kidd, Board Chair
- Melissa Calloway, Board Vice Chair
- Mikayla Cassidy
- Baxter Hammer
- Adam Hurley
- Hailey Lee
- Ryan Patton
- Dr. Beth Knott
- Dr. Brad Thomas
