= Staley, North Carolina =

- Town
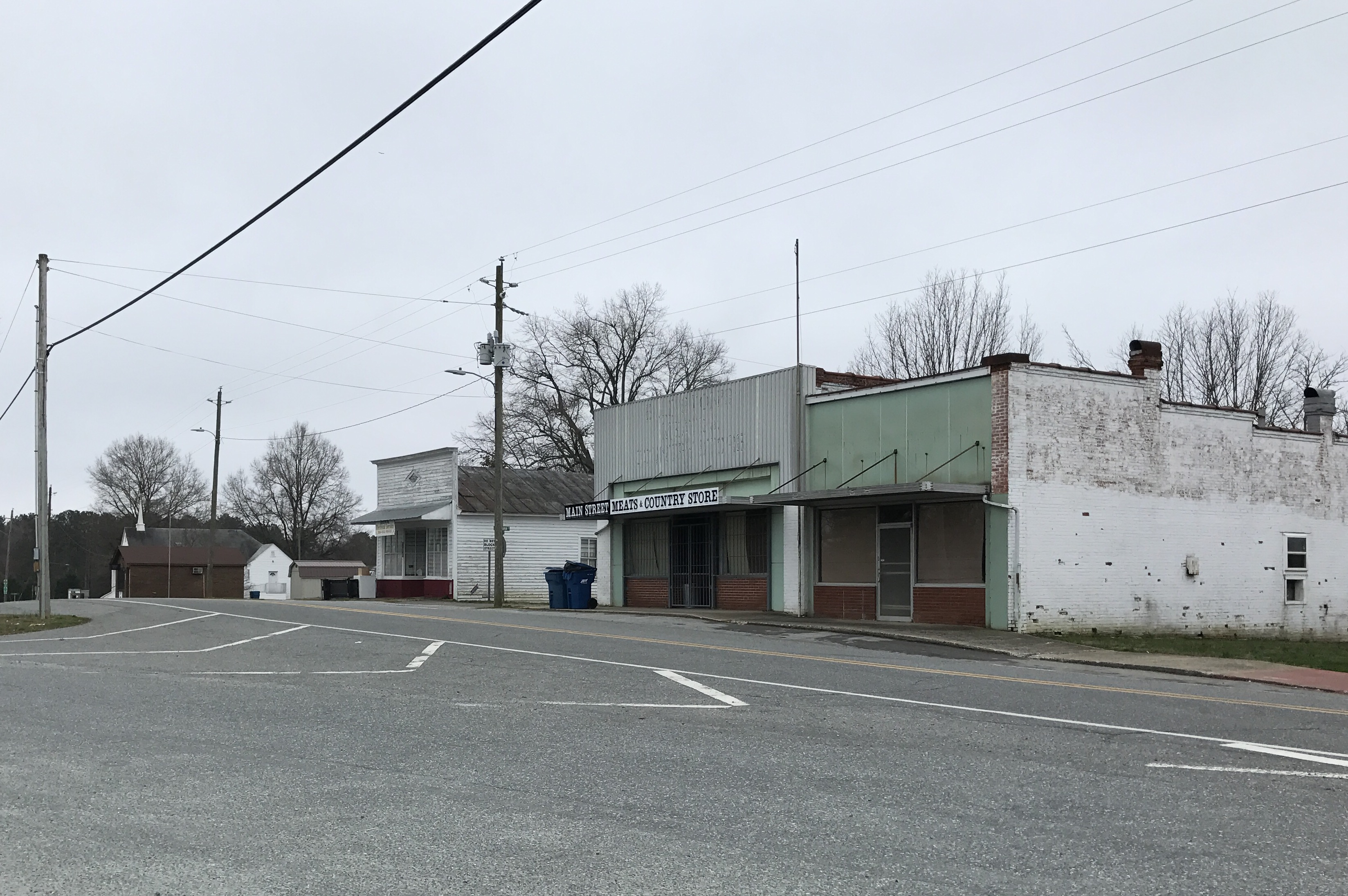
- Buildings along Main Street in Staley

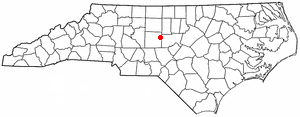
- Location of Staley, North Carolina
- Coordinates: 35°47′53″N 79°33′06″W
- Country: United States
- State: North Carolina
- County: Randolph
- Founded: 1883
- Incorporated: 1901
- Named for: John W. Staley

Area
  - Total: 1.16 sq mi (3.00 km^{2})
  - Land: 1.16 sq mi (3.00 km^{2})
  - Water: 0 sq mi (0.00 km^{2})
- Elevation: 725 ft (221 m)

Population (2020)
  - Total: 397
  - Density: 342.4/sq mi (132.21/km^{2})
- Time zone: UTC-5 (Eastern (EST))
  - Summer (DST): UTC-4 (EDT)
- ZIP code: 27355
- Area code: 336
- FIPS code: 37-64380
- GNIS feature ID: 2407394

Staley is a town in Randolph County, North Carolina, United States. As of the 2020 census, Staley had a population of 397.

== History ==
The Marley House was listed on the National Register of Historic Places in 1990.

Among the earliest settlers here was Jacob Leyenberger, aka Lineberry, said to be the first and only of the line of this family in America, born in the Harz Mountains of Northern Germany (Braunschweig), who arrived in Philadelphia on the Ship Robert and Alice from Dublin via Rotterdam, on September 3, 1739. The family lived on a farm in Southampton, Pennsylvania, Bucks County, and in the late summer of 1758, August 22, Jacob and his wife, Elizabeth Quarter departed for North Carolina, taking the Great Wagon Road into Orange County, now Chatham County and Randolph County, North Carolina. Jacob and his wife raised ten children, eight born in Germany. Their land appears to be in present day Chatham County near the border with Randolph County, east/northeast of the town of Staley, along the Rocky River (1780 Deed of sale). This area was likely part of Orange County before the boundary change in 1771. They are buried near the Brush Creek in the Lineberry Family Cemetery.

== Geography ==
According to the United States Census Bureau, the town has a total area of 1.2 square miles (3.1 km^{2}), all land.

== Demographics ==
Historical population
Census	Pop.	Note	%±
1920	157		—
1930	241		53.5%
1940	255		5.8%
1950	236		−7.5%
1960	260		10.2%
1970	239		−8.1%
1980	204		−14.6%
1990	204		0.0%
2000	347		70.1%
2010	393		13.3%
2020	397		1.0%
U.S. Decennial Census

As of the census of 2000, there were 347 people, 125 households, and 98 families residing in the town. The population density was 285.9 inhabitants per square mile (110.4/km^{2}). There were 136 housing units at an average density of 112.1 per square mile (43.3/km^{2}). The racial makeup of the town was 82.42% White, 6.34% African American, 2.31% Native American, 5.76% from other races, and 3.17% from two or more races. Hispanic or Latino of any race were 10.09% of the population.

There were 125 households, out of which 38.4% had children under the age of 18 living with them, 63.2% were married couples living together, 13.6% had a female householder with no husband present, and 21.6% were non-families. 19.2% of all households were made up of individuals, and 8.0% had someone living alone who was 65 years of age or older. The average household size was 2.78 and the average family size was 3.10.

In the town, the population was spread out, with 28.2% under the age of 18, 6.9% from 18 to 24, 28.0% from 25 to 44, 25.9% from 45 to 64, and 11.0% who were 65 years of age or older. The median age was 36 years. For every 100 females, there were 93.9 males. For every 100 females age 18 and over, there were 88.6 males.

The median income for a household in the town was $36,964, and the median income for a family was $43,000. Males had a median income of $31,250 versus $22,045 for females. The per capita income for the town was $14,758. About 11.4% of families and 13.6% of the population were below the poverty line, including 22.0% of those under age 18 and 13.9% of those age 65 or over.
