= Wilson Kindley Farm and Kindley Mine =

Historic farm in North Carolina, United States

- U.S. National Register of Historic Places
- U.S. Historic district
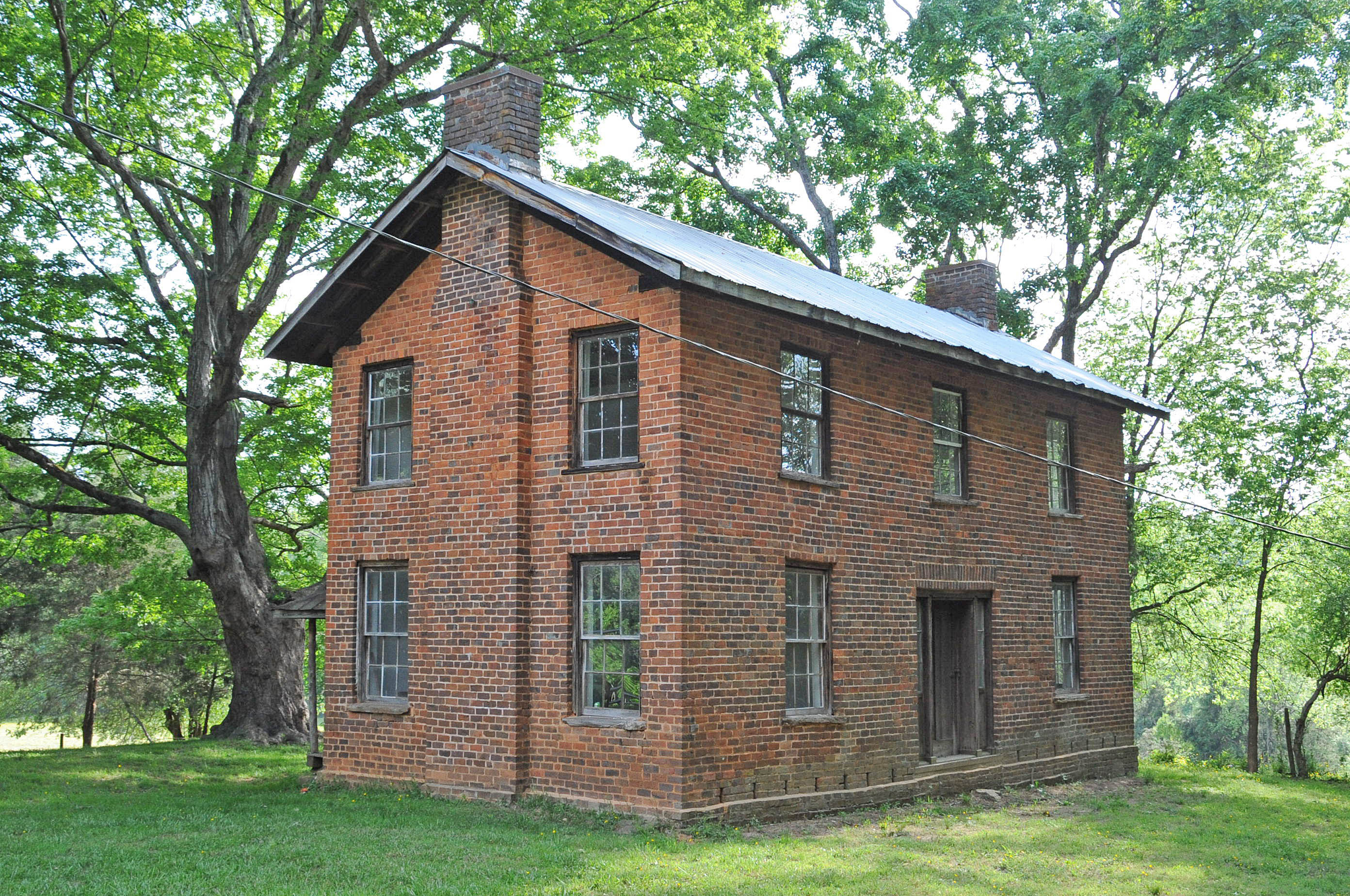
- Farmhouse

- Location within North Carolina Location within the United States
- Nearest city: NC 1107, approximately 1.5 miles south of the junction with NC 1170, near Asheboro, North Carolina
- Coordinates: 35°44′47″N 79°58′15″W
- Area: 43.3 acres (17.5 ha)
- Built: c. 1873
- Architectural style: Greek Revival
- NRHP reference No.: 91001412
- Added to NRHP: June 11, 1992

Wilson Kindley Farm and Kindley Mine is a historic home, farm, gold mine, and national historic district located near Asheboro, Randolph County, North Carolina. The Wilson Kindley House was built around 1873, and is a two-story, single-pile, three-bay, vernacular Greek Revival style brick dwelling. It has a moderately pitched gable roof and overhanging eaves. Other contributing resources are the well, wheathouse, the agricultural landscape, and the Kindley Mine, which was dug in the later quarter of the 19th century.

It was added to the National Register of Historic Places in 1992.

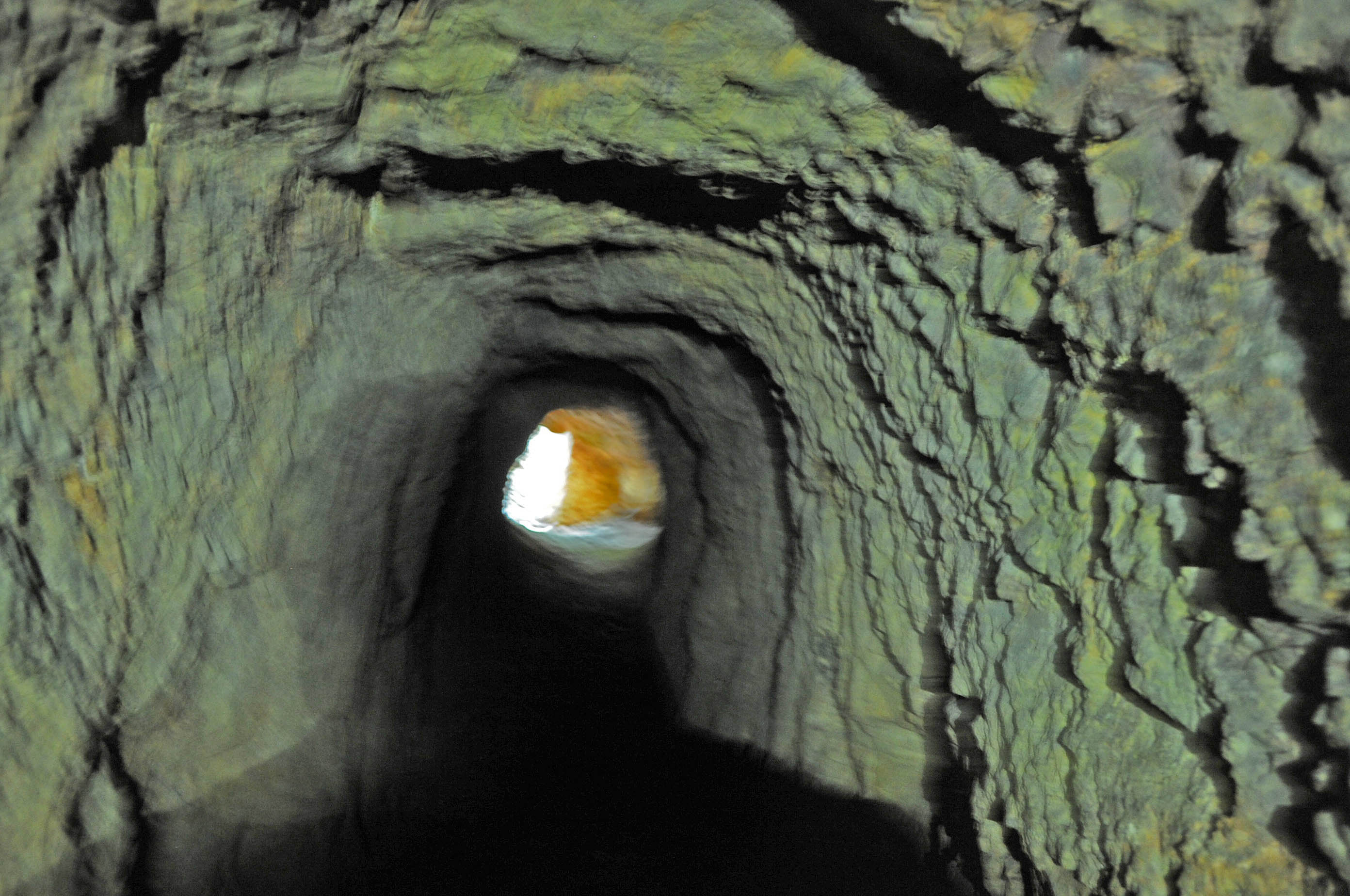
Mine, inside looking out

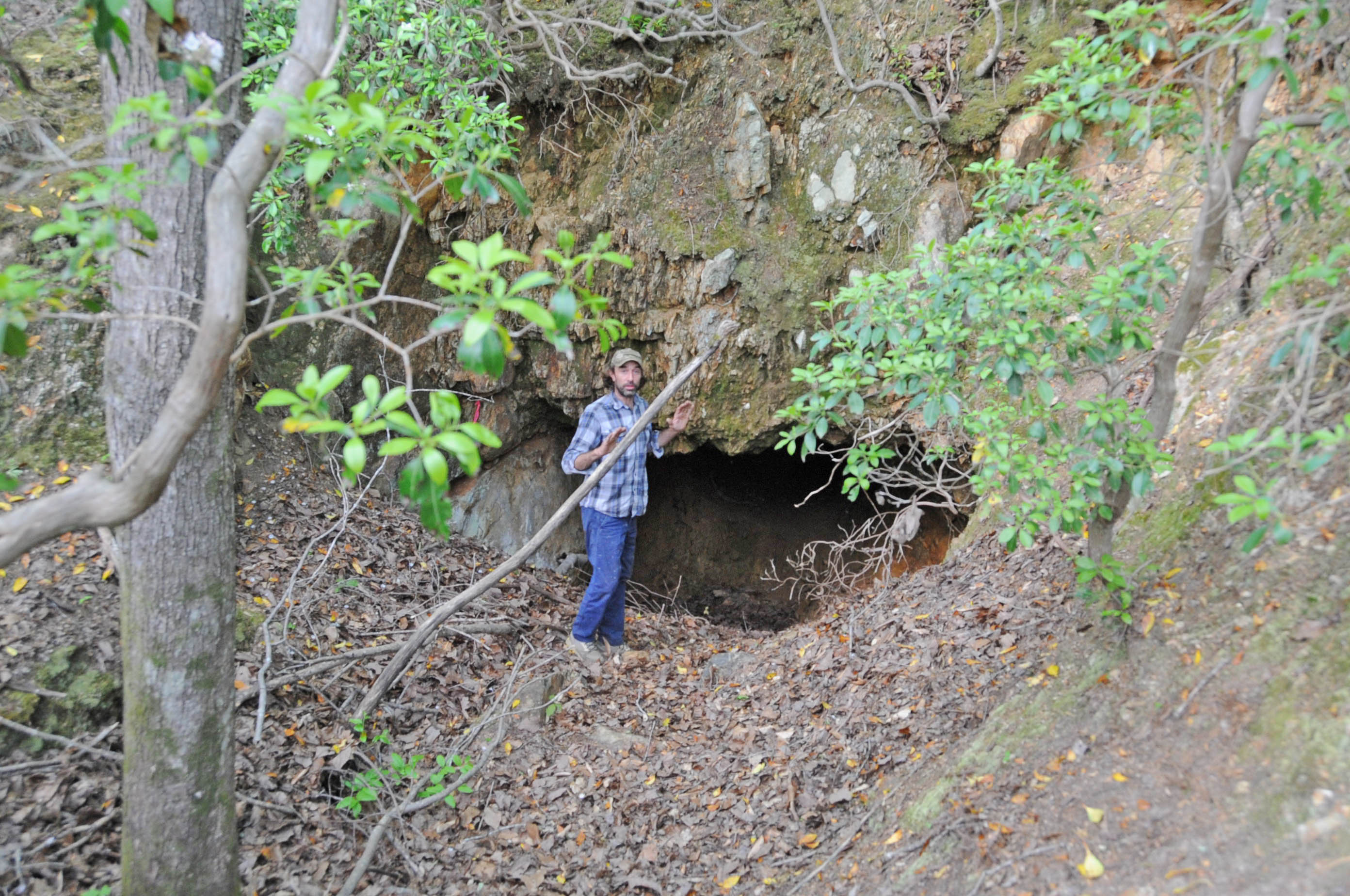
Mine, outside looking in
