= Asheboro Hosiery Mills and Cranford Furniture Company Complex =

Historic mill complex in North Carolina, US

- U.S. National Register of Historic Places
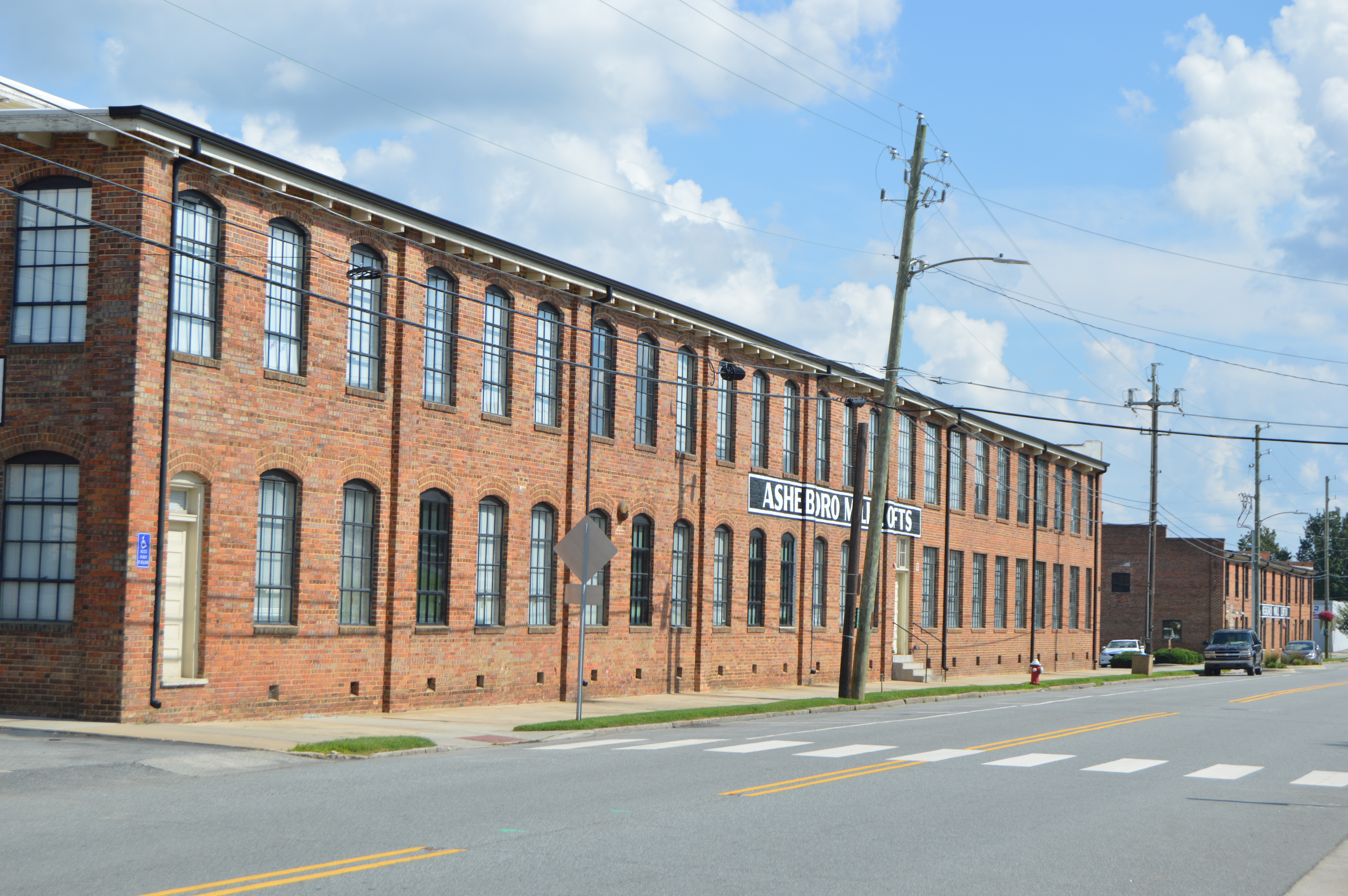
- Church Street side of the complex

- Location within North Carolina Location within the United States
- Location: 133 and 139 S. Church St. and 230 W. Academy Sts., Asheboro, North Carolina
- Coordinates: 35°42′16″N 79°49′0″W
- Area: 3 acres (1.2 ha)
- Built: 1917-1940
- Architectural style: Art Moderne
- NRHP reference No.: 11000891
- Added to NRHP: December 7, 2011

Asheboro Hosiery Mills and Cranford Furniture Company Complex, also known as Cranford Industries and National Chair Company, is a historic textile mill and furniture factory complex located at Asheboro, Randolph County, North Carolina. The complex includes three brick industrial buildings erected from 1917 through the 1940s and the Cranford Industries Office, constructed in 1925. Also on the property are the contributing Cranford Industries Smokestack built in the 1950s and a lumber shed erected in the late-1950s.

It was added to the National Register of Historic Places in 2011.

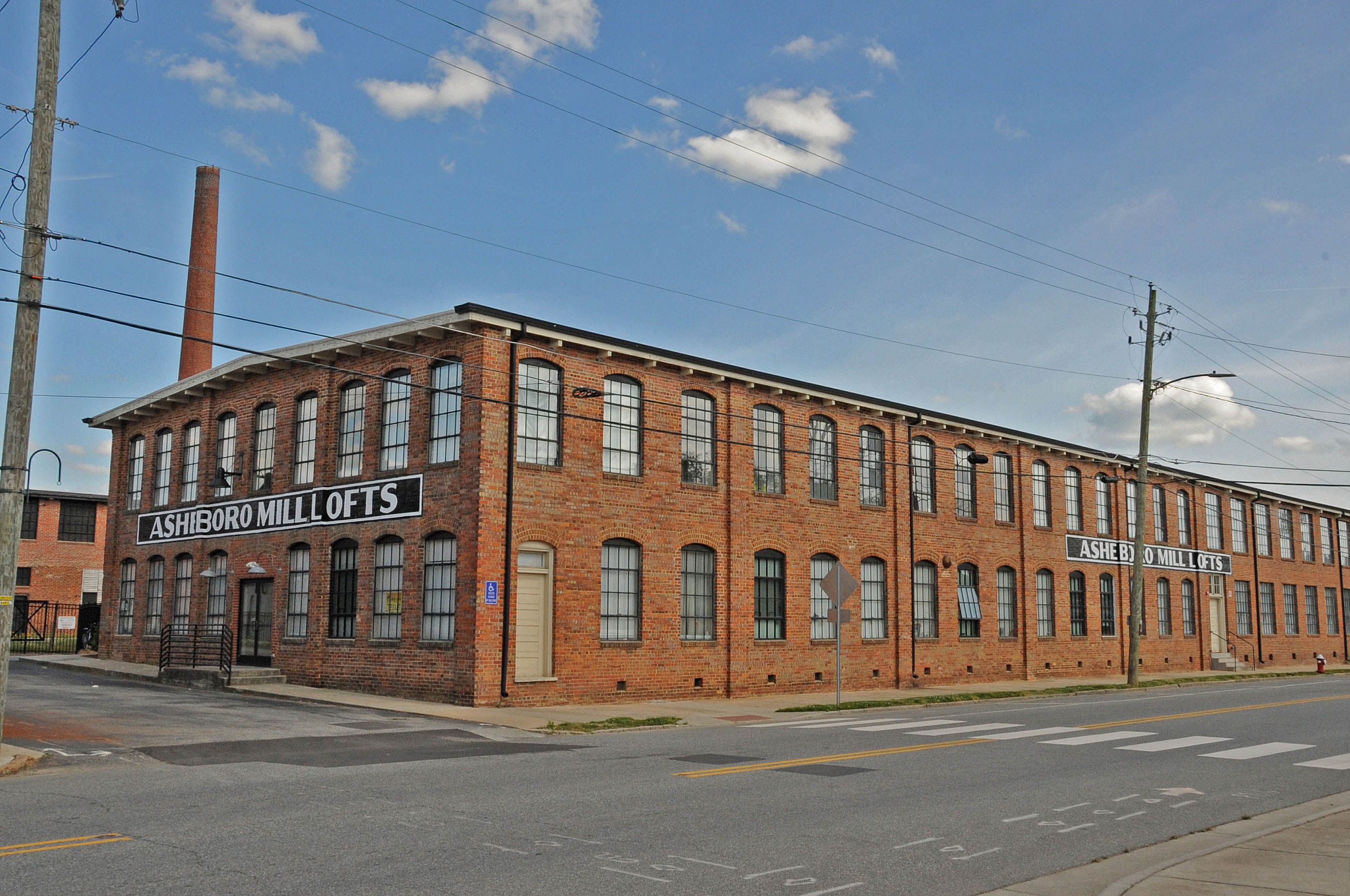
