= Sunset Theater =

Historic theater in North Carolina, US

- U.S. National Register of Historic Places
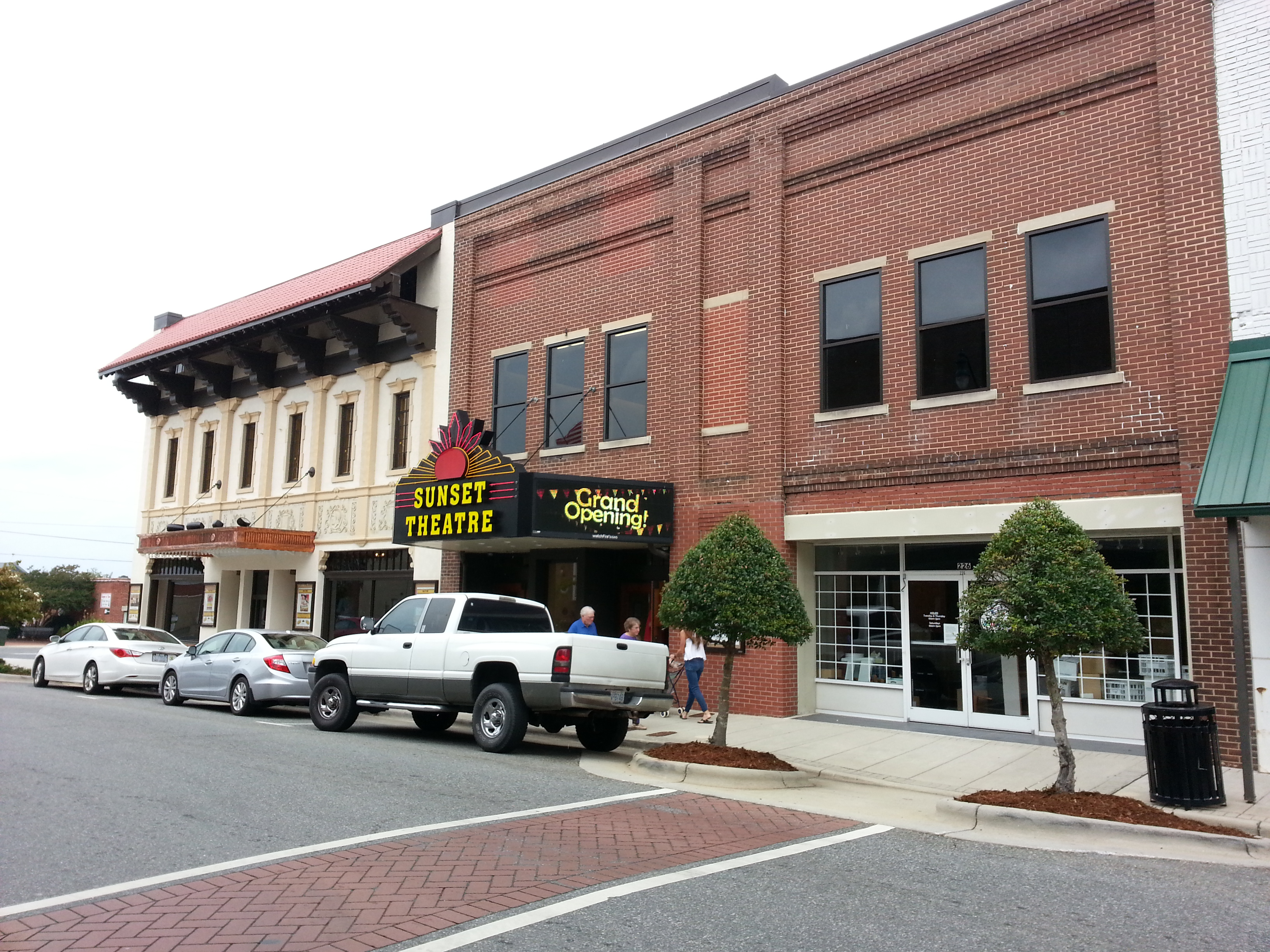
- Sunset Theater, September 2013

- Location within North Carolina Location within the United States
- Location: 232, 234, 236 Sunset Avenue, Asheboro, North Carolina
- Coordinates: 35°42′22″N 79°49′00″W
- Area: 22.6 acres (9.1 ha)
- Built: 1929
- Built by: Trogden, S. E.
- Architect: Holleyman, William C. Jr.; Benton & Benton
- Architectural style: Mission/Spanish Colonial Revival
- NRHP reference No.: 11000210
- Added to NRHP: April 20, 2011

Sunset Theater is a historic movie theater located at Asheboro, Randolph County, North Carolina. It was designed by the architectural firm of Benton & Benton and built in 1929. It is a two-story, parapet roof load-bearing stuccoed brick building in the Spanish Colonial Revival style. It measures approximately 50 feet by 100 feet and has a large open auditorium seating 412. The theater was purchased by the City of Asheboro in 2005.

It was added to the National Register of Historic Places in 2011.
