= William Dennis Pottery Kiln and House Site =

- U.S. National Register of Historic Places
- Location: Address Restricted, Randleman, North Carolina
- Area: 0 acres (0 ha)
- NRHP reference No.: 13001116
- Added to NRHP: January 22, 2014

William Dennis Pottery Kiln and House Site is a historic archaeological site located at Randleman, Randolph County, North Carolina. It was the site of the pottery kiln and home of William Dennis (b. 1769) and his son Thomas (b. 1791) and remained in operation until 1832. The pottery produced simple, utilitarian redware, and a variety of decorative slipware and tableware products. The William Dennis pottery and house site was located in 1974.

It was listed on the National Register of Historic Places in 2014.
