= Franklinville Historic District =

Historic district in North Carolina, United States

- U.S. National Register of Historic Places
- U.S. Historic district
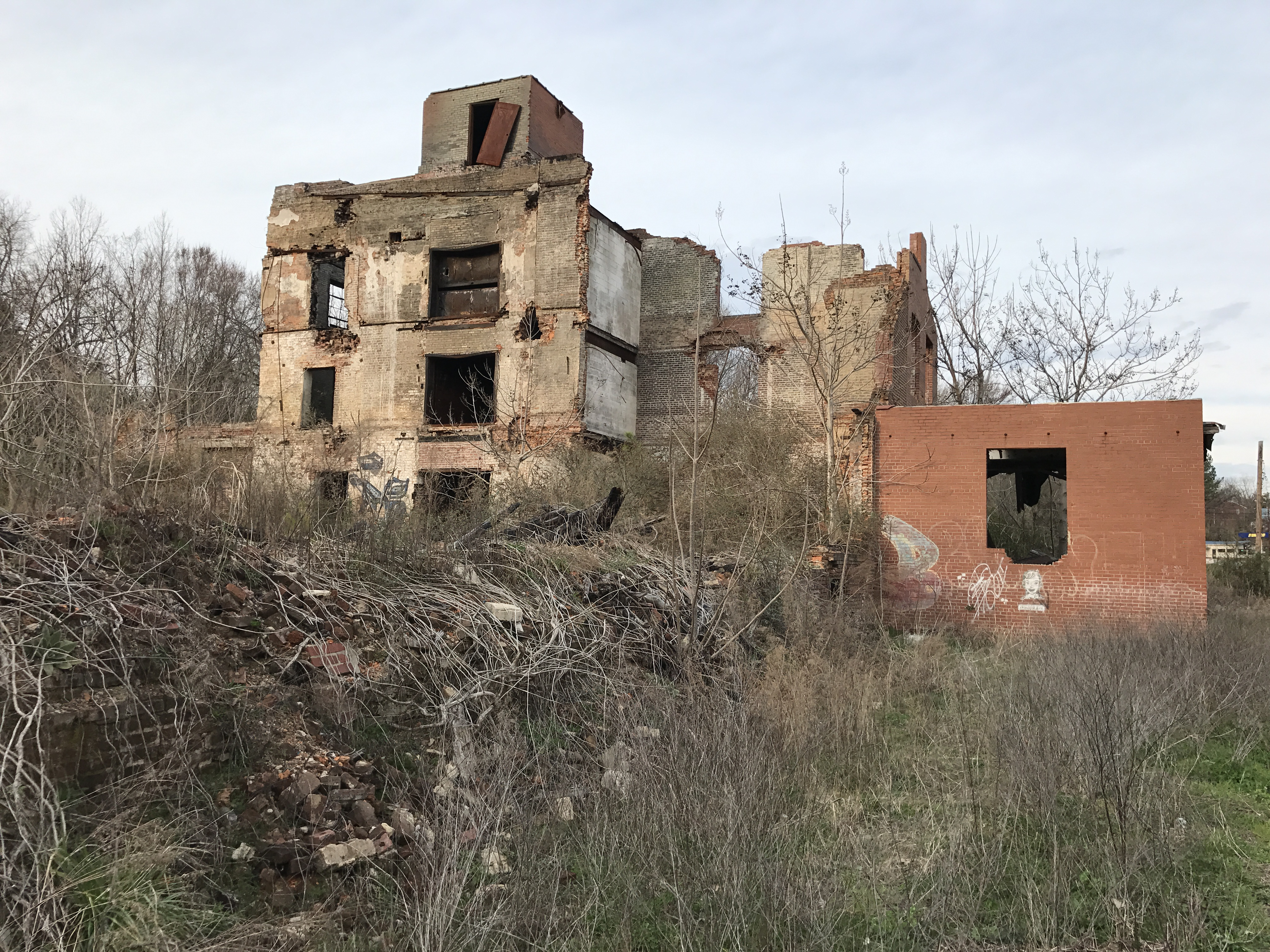
- Ruins of the Franklinville Manufacturing Company building

- Location within North Carolina Location within the United States
- Location: Roughly bounded by Deep River, Sunrise Ave., Clark St., and Greensboro Rd., Franklinville, North Carolina
- Coordinates: 35°44′47″N 79°58′15″W
- Area: 208 acres (84 ha)
- Built: c. 1819
- Architect: Multiple
- Architectural style: Late 19th And Early 20th Century American Movements, Greek Revival, Triple-A;hall & parlor
- NRHP reference No.: 84000587
- Added to NRHP: December 20, 1984

Franklinville Historic District is a national historic district located at Franklinville, Randolph County, North Carolina. The district encompasses 137 contributing buildings, 1 contributing site, and 5 contributing structures in the central business district and surrounding residential sections of Franklinville. It includes buildings built between about 1819 and the late 1920s and notable examples of Victorian and Greek Revival architecture. Notable buildings include the Franklinville Manufacturing Company complex, Johnson-Julian House (c. 1819), Horney-Curtis-Buie House (c. 1830), a group of antebellum mill houses (c. 1838), Madison Brower House (c. 1840), Hanks Lodge (1850), Frazier-Fentress House (c. 1890), Franklinville Methodist Church (1912-1913), Grove Hotel (1915-1919), and Franklinville Store Company (1920).

It was added to the National Register of Historic Places in 1984.
