= Acme-McCrary Hosiery Mills =

Historic buildings in North Carolina, US

- U.S. National Register of Historic Places
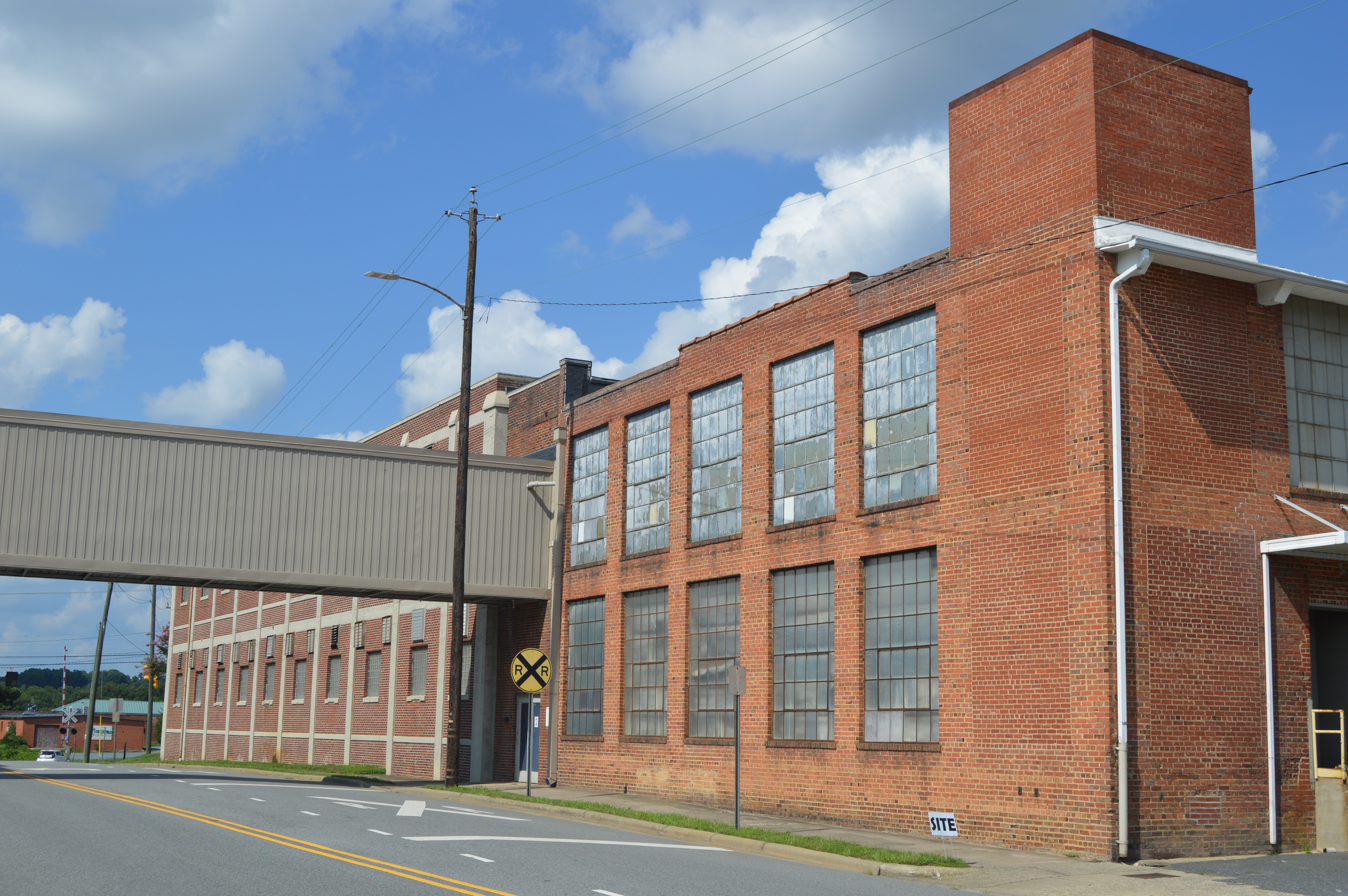
- Mill #2

- Location within North Carolina Location within the United States
- Location: 124, 148, 159 North & 173 N. Church Sts., Asheboro, North Carolina
- Coordinates: 35°42′25″N 79°49′01″W
- Area: 7.32 acres (2.96 ha)
- Built: 1909-1964
- Architect: Biberstein, R. C.
- Architectural style: Art Moderne, Commercial Style
- NRHP reference No.: 14000496
- Added to NRHP: August 18, 2014

Acme-McCrary Hosiery Mills, also known as Acme Hosiery Mills, McCrary Hosiery Mills, and Asheboro Grocery Company, is a historic textile mill complex located at Asheboro, Randolph County, North Carolina. The complex includes six buildings and a smokestack, erected between 1909 and 1962. The mill buildings were designed by architect Richard C. Biberstein and the oldest section is a two-story, heavy-timber-frame mill with load bearing brick walls. The Acme-McCrary-Sapona Recreation Center was built in 1948–1949, and is a two-story, Art Moderne style brick recreation center. The buildings were added to the National Register of Historic Places in 2014.

The buildings were owned by Acme Hosiery Mills, which was purchased by brothers-in-law D.B. McCrary and T.H. Redding in 1909. Acme-McCrary went on to become the third-largest producer of private label hosiery in the world, with factories in three locations. Its production assets were purchased by Sri Lanka–based MAS Capital in 2017, but Acme-McCrary retained the historic buildings in Asheboro, which by that point only housed its corporate offices. Acme-McCrary planned to vacate the buildings following the acquisition, opening up almost 200,000 square feet of downtown real estate for commercial or residential use.

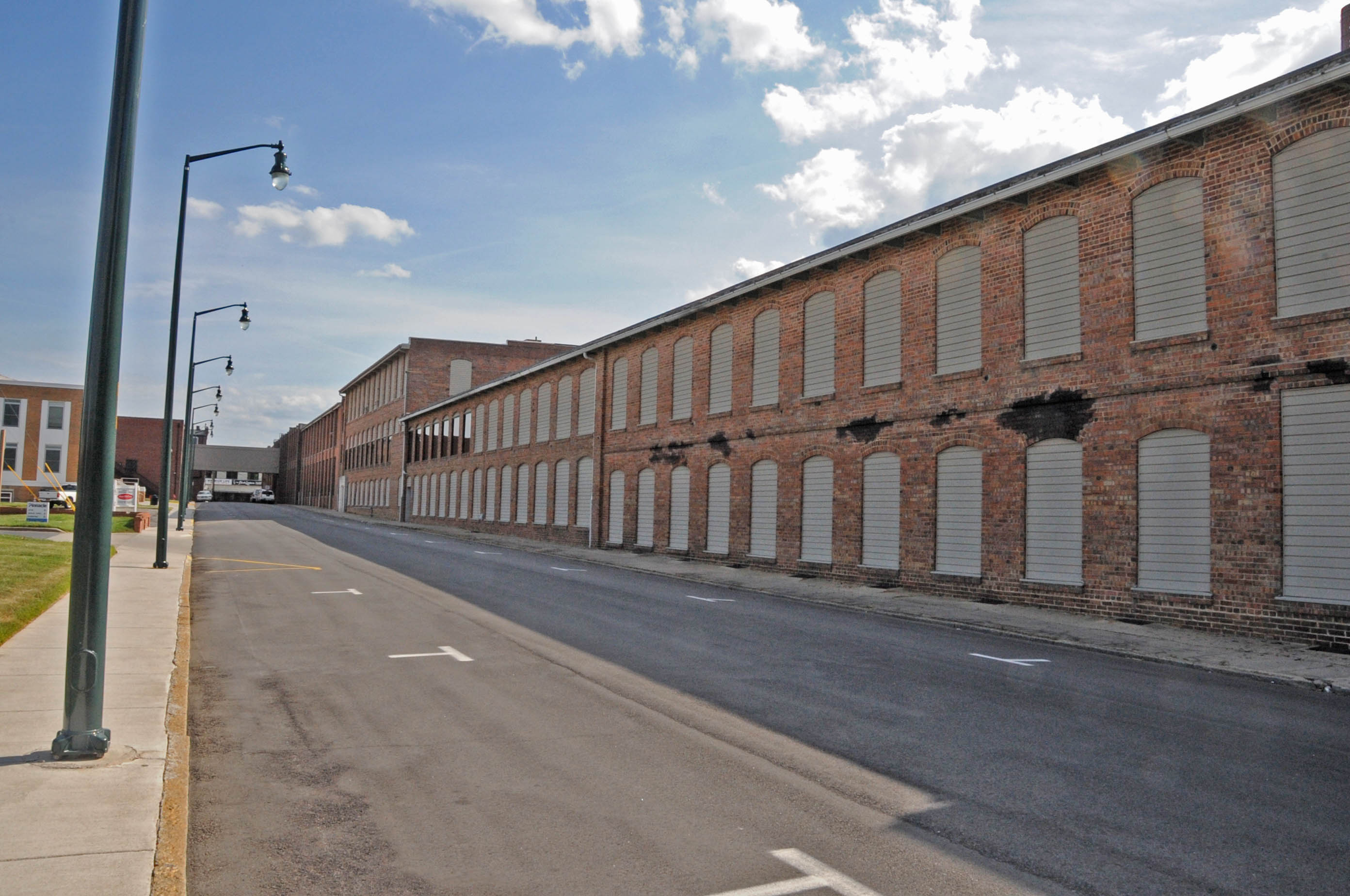
