= Randleman Graded School =

Historic school building in North Carolina, United States

- U.S. National Register of Historic Places
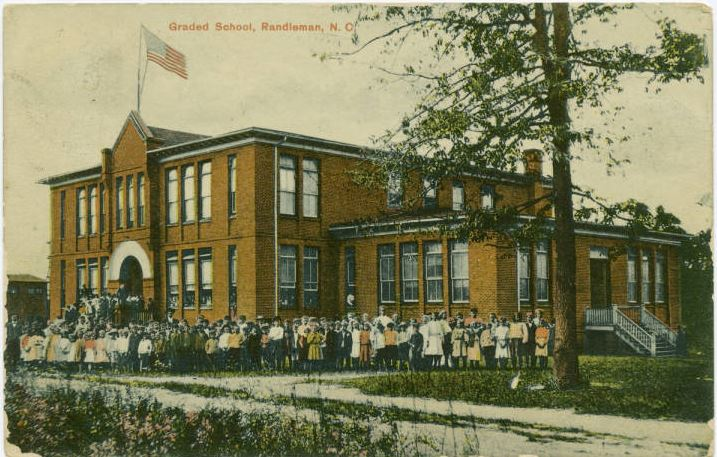
- Randleman Graded School (c. 1908)

- Location within North Carolina Location within the United States
- Location: 130 W. Academy St., Randleman, North Carolina
- Coordinates: 35°49′6″N 79°48′22″W
- Area: 2.2 acres (0.89 ha)
- Built: 1906, 1926, 1937
- Built by: Henley, Mr.
- Architectural style: Late 19th And 20th Century Revivals
- NRHP reference No.: 05000326
- Added to NRHP: April 20, 2005

Randleman Graded School, also known as Randleman High School and Shaw Furniture Industries Showroom, is a historic school building located at Randleman, Randolph County, North Carolina. It was built in 1906, and is a two-story brick building, five-bays wide and three bays deep, with a low-hipped roof and flanking hip-roofed two-bay wings added in 1926. The building is Romanesque Revival-influenced and features a projecting entrance pavilion with a massive Richardsonian Romanesque-influenced arch. In 1937, an extension to the east wing was added. The building housed a school until 1960, then a furniture showroom until 2000.

It was added to the National Register of Historic Places in 2005.
