= Franklinville, North Carolina =

- Town
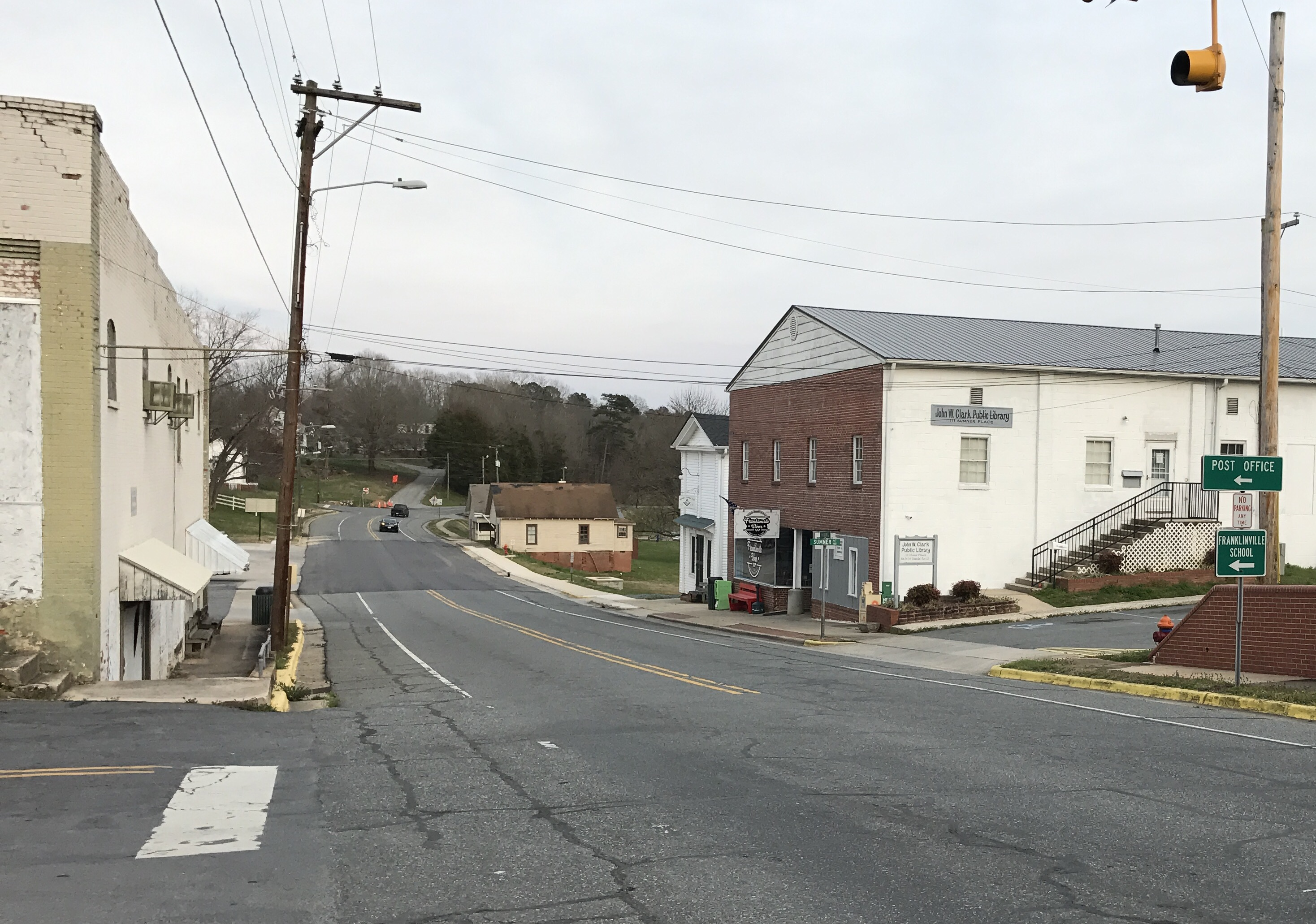

- Seal

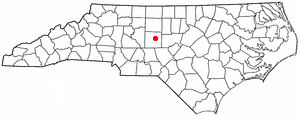
- Location of Franklinville, North Carolina
- Coordinates: 35°44′31″N 79°41′22″W
- Country: United States
- State: North Carolina
- County: Randolph
- Incorporated: 1847
- Named for: Jesse Franklin

Area
  - Total: 1.64 sq mi (4.24 km^{2})
  - Land: 1.62 sq mi (4.20 km^{2})
  - Water: 0.015 sq mi (0.04 km^{2})
- Elevation: 453 ft (138 m)

Population (2020)
  - Total: 1,197
  - Density: 738.2/sq mi (285.01/km^{2})
- Time zone: UTC-5 (Eastern (EST))
  - Summer (DST): UTC-4 (EDT)
- ZIP code: 27248
- Area code: 336
- FIPS code: 37-24740
- GNIS feature ID: 2406522
- Website: www.franklinvillenc.org/

Franklinville is a town in Randolph County, North Carolina, United States. As of the 2020 census, Franklinville had a population of 1,197.

== History ==
The Franklinville Historic District was added to the National Register of Historic Places in 1984.

== Geography ==
According to the United States Census Bureau, the town has a total area of 1.2 square miles (3.1 km^{2}), of which 1.2 square miles (3.1 km^{2}) is land and 0.80% is water.

== Demographics ==
Historical population
| Census | Pop. | Note | %± |
|---|---|---|---|
| 1880 | 366 | | — |
| 1920 | 631 | | — |
| 1930 | 676 | | 7.1% |
| 1940 | 851 | | 25.9% |
| 1950 | 778 | | −8.6% |
| 1960 | 686 | | −11.8% |
| 1970 | 794 | | 15.7% |
| 1980 | 607 | | −23.6% |
| 1990 | 666 | | 9.7% |
| 2000 | 1,258 | | 88.9% |
| 2010 | 1,164 | | −7.5% |
| 2020 | 1,197 | | 2.8% |
U.S. Decennial Census

As of the census of 2000, there were 1,258 people, 441 households, and 324 families residing in the town. The population density was 1,021.2 inhabitants per square mile (394.3/km^{2}). There were 575 housing units at an average density of 466.7 per square mile (180.2/km^{2}). The racial makeup of the town was 78.22% White, 10.10% African American, 0.95% Native American, 0.56% Asian, 8.59% from other races, and 1.59% from two or more races. Hispanic or Latino of any race were 16.45% of the population.

There were 441 households, out of which 42.2% had children under the age of 18 living with them, 49.4% were married couples living together, 18.1% had a female householder with no husband present, and 26.5% were non-families. 21.5% of all households were made up of individuals, and 7.5% had someone living alone who was 65 years of age or older. The average household size was 2.85 and the average family size was 3.23.

In the town, the population was spread out, with 31.9% under the age of 18, 13.7% from 18 to 24, 31.5% from 25 to 44, 14.8% from 45 to 64, and 8.2% who were 65 years of age or older. The median age was 28 years. For every 100 females, there were 95.3 males. For every 100 females age 18 and over, there were 92.6 males.

The median income for a household in the town was $29,390, and the median income for a family was $32,679. Males had a median income of $26,141 versus $16,364 for females. The per capita income for the town was $13,352. About 15.8% of families and 19.8% of the population were below the poverty line, including 27.0% of those under age 18 and 13.1% of those age 65 or over.
