= Randleman, North Carolina =

- City
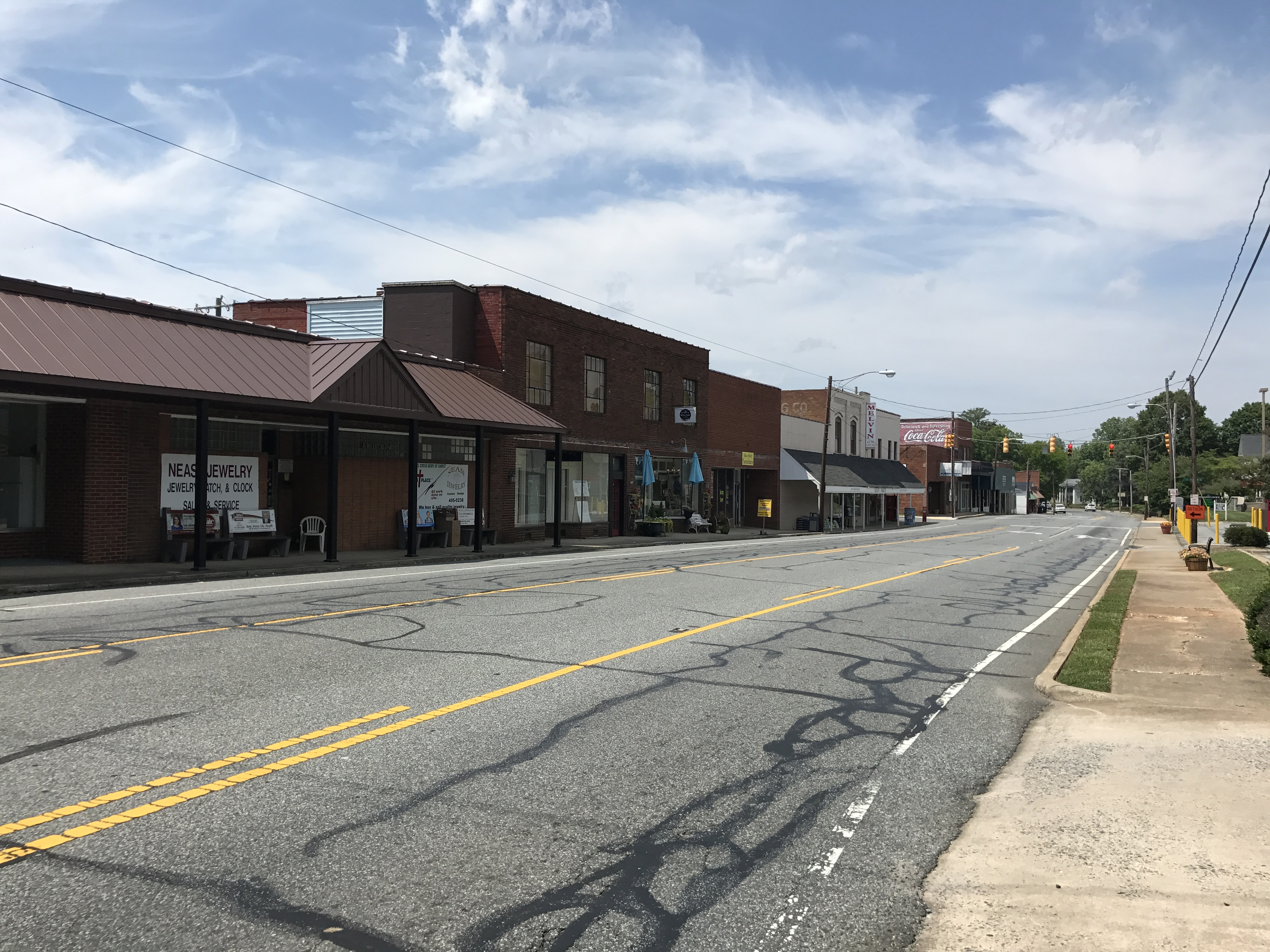
- Main Street

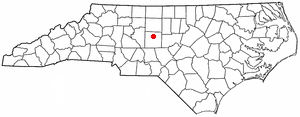
- Location of Randleman, North Carolina
- Coordinates: 35°48′59″N 79°48′24″W
- Country: United States
- State: North Carolina
- County: Randolph
- Incorporated: 1880
- Named for: John B. Randleman

Area
  - Total: 4.12 sq mi (10.67 km^{2})
  - Land: 4.08 sq mi (10.57 km^{2})
  - Water: 0.042 sq mi (0.11 km^{2})
- Elevation: 715 ft (218 m)

Population (2020)
  - Total: 4,595
  - Density: 1,126.2/sq mi (434.81/km^{2})
- Time zone: UTC-5 (Eastern (EST))
  - Summer (DST): UTC-4 (EDT)
- ZIP code: 27317
- Area code: 336
- FIPS code: 37-55080
- GNIS feature ID: 2404592
- Website: cityofrandleman.com

Randleman is a city in Randolph County, North Carolina, United States. As of the 2020 census, Randleman had a population of 4,595. It is the home of NASCAR's Petty family, the Victory Junction Gang Camp and was the location of the Richard Petty Museum from 2003 to 2014.

== Geography ==
According to the United States Census Bureau, the city has a total area of 3.6 square miles (9.3 km^{2}), of which 3.6 square miles (9.3 km^{2}) is land and 0.04 square miles (0.10 km^{2}) (0.83%) is water.

=== Climate ===
Climate data for Randleman, North Carolina (1991–2020)
Month	Jan	Feb	Mar	Apr	May	Jun	Jul	Aug	Sep	Oct	Nov	Dec	Year
Mean daily maximum °F (°C)	49.4 (9.7)	53.7 (12.1)	61.5 (16.4)	71.5 (21.9)	77.9 (25.5)	85.1 (29.5)	88.4 (31.3)	86.4 (30.2)	80.6 (27.0)	71.1 (21.7)	61.1 (16.2)	52.4 (11.3)	69.9 (21.1)
Daily mean °F (°C)	38.4 (3.6)	41.6 (5.3)	49.0 (9.4)	58.6 (14.8)	66.6 (19.2)	74.8 (23.8)	78.4 (25.8)	76.6 (24.8)	70.4 (21.3)	59.5 (15.3)	48.9 (9.4)	41.4 (5.2)	58.7 (14.8)
Mean daily minimum °F (°C)	27.3 (−2.6)	29.5 (−1.4)	36.4 (2.4)	45.6 (7.6)	55.3 (12.9)	64.4 (18.0)	68.4 (20.2)	66.8 (19.3)	60.1 (15.6)	47.9 (8.8)	36.7 (2.6)	30.4 (−0.9)	47.4 (8.5)
Average precipitation inches (mm)	3.68 (93)	3.05 (77)	4.31 (109)	3.93 (100)	3.60 (91)	3.95 (100)	4.10 (104)	3.90 (99)	4.59 (117)	3.35 (85)	3.57 (91)	3.43 (87)	45.46 (1,153)
Average snowfall inches (cm)	2.3 (5.8)	1.1 (2.8)	0.5 (1.3)	0.0 (0.0)	0.0 (0.0)	0.0 (0.0)	0.0 (0.0)	0.0 (0.0)	0.0 (0.0)	0.0 (0.0)	0.1 (0.25)	0.6 (1.5)	4.6 (11.65)
Source: NOAA

== History ==
The town was originally named Dicks for Rick Dicks, who built a mill there circa 1830. Later, a cotton mill was built in Dicks, and the town was renamed Union Factory.

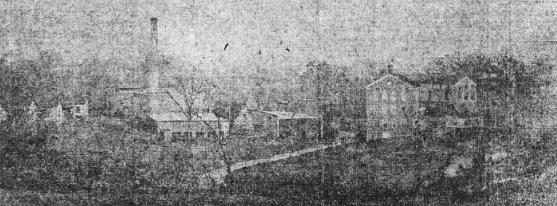
Deep River Mills in Randleman, 1917

Randleman was the next name chosen, in 1866. The town's namesake was John B. Randleman, a mill owner. The town was incorporated as Randleman Mills in 1880; the name was later changed to Randleman.

William Dennis Pottery Kiln and House Site and Randleman Graded School are listed on the National Register of Historic Places.

== Demographics ==
Historical population
Census	Pop.	Note	%±
1880	1,027		—
1890	1,754		70.8%
1900	2,190		24.9%
1910	1,950		−11.0%
1920	1,967		0.9%
1930	1,863		−5.3%
1940	2,032		9.1%
1950	2,066		1.7%
1960	2,232		8.0%
1970	2,312		3.6%
1980	2,156		−6.7%
1990	2,612		21.2%
2000	3,557		36.2%
2010	4,113		15.6%
2020	4,595		11.7%
U.S. Decennial Census

=== 2020 census ===
Randleman racial composition
Race	Number	Percentage
White (non-Hispanic)	3,502	76.21%
Black or African American (non-Hispanic)	334	7.27%
Native American	20	0.44%
Asian	32	0.7%
Pacific Islander	1	0.02%
Other/Mixed	210	4.57%
Hispanic or Latino	496	10.79%

As of the 2020 census, Randleman had a population of 4,595. There were 1,662 households and 1,030 families residing in the city. The median age was 38.5 years. 24.1% of residents were under the age of 18 and 14.8% of residents were 65 years of age or older. For every 100 females, there were 92.9 males, and for every 100 females age 18 and over, there were 92.2 males age 18 and over.

96.5% of residents lived in urban areas, while 3.5% lived in rural areas.

Of households in Randleman, 33.3% had children under the age of 18 living in them. Of all households, 43.0% were married-couple households, 18.9% were households with a male householder and no spouse or partner present, and 30.9% were households with a female householder and no spouse or partner present. About 30.6% of all households were made up of individuals, and 13.3% had someone living alone who was 65 years of age or older.

There were 1,982 housing units, of which 5.6% were vacant. The homeowner vacancy rate was 1.7%, and the rental vacancy rate was 5.4%.

=== 2000 census ===
As of the census of 2000, there were 3,557 people, 1,452 households, and 985 families residing in the city. The population density was 997.4 inhabitants per square mile (385.1/km^{2}). There were 1,542 housing units at an average density of 432.4 per square mile (167.0/km^{2}). The racial makeup of the city was 91.23% White, 3.71% African American, 0.34% Native American, 0.39% Asian, 2.81% from other races, and 1.52% from two or more races. Hispanic or Latino of any race were 8.38%.

There were 1,452 households, out of which 35.5% had children under the age of 18 living with them, 47.7% were married couples living together, 15.2% had a female householder with no husband present, and 32.1% were non-families. 29.5% of all households were made up of individuals, and 12.2% had someone living alone who was 65 years of age or older. The average household size was 2.42 and the average family size was 2.96.

In the city, the population was spread out, with 26.7% under the age of 18, 8.1% from 18 to 24, 31.4% from 25 to 44, 20.5% from 45 to 64, and 13.4% who were 65 years of age or older. The median age was 34 years. For every 100 females, there were 88.7 males. For every 100 females age 18 and over, there were 85.0 males.

The median income for a household in the city was $30,572, and the median income for a family was $35,123. Males had a median income of $27,692 versus $21,806 for females. The per capita income for the city was $14,286. About 8.5% of families and 11.2% of the population were below the poverty line, including 17.2% of those under age 18 and 15.2% of those age 65 or over.

== Notable structures ==
The American Towers Tower Randleman is a guyed mast for TV transmissions with a height of 1,853.88 feet.

== Notable people ==
- Antonio Goss – NFL linebacker, two-time Super Bowl champion for the San Francisco 49ers
- Kyle Petty – NASCAR driver from 1979 to 2008, current racing commentator
- Lee Petty – NASCAR driver, three-time Cup Series champion, NASCAR Hall of Fame inductee in 2011
- Maurice Petty – NASCAR champion engine builder and Richard Petty's brother, NASCAR Hall of Fame inductee in 2014
- Richard Petty – NASCAR driver, seven-time Cup Series champion driver and Cup Series record holder for career wins with 200, inaugural NASCAR Hall of Fame inductee in 2010
- Brent Ridge – physician, business owner, reality television participant

== Education ==
Randolph County School System operates public schools. Randleman Elementary is the only school within the city limits of Randleman with Randleman High and Randleman Middle just outside the city. Level Cross Elementary is also near and has a Randleman address.

== Attractions ==
- The Victory Junction Gang Camp is located near Randleman in the community of Level Cross, Randolph County, North Carolina. It was founded in honor of Adam Petty by Kyle and Pattie Petty.

== Sources ==
Powell, William, The North Carolina Gazetteer, University of North Carolina Press, Chapel Hill, 1968.
