= Asheboro, North Carolina =

- City
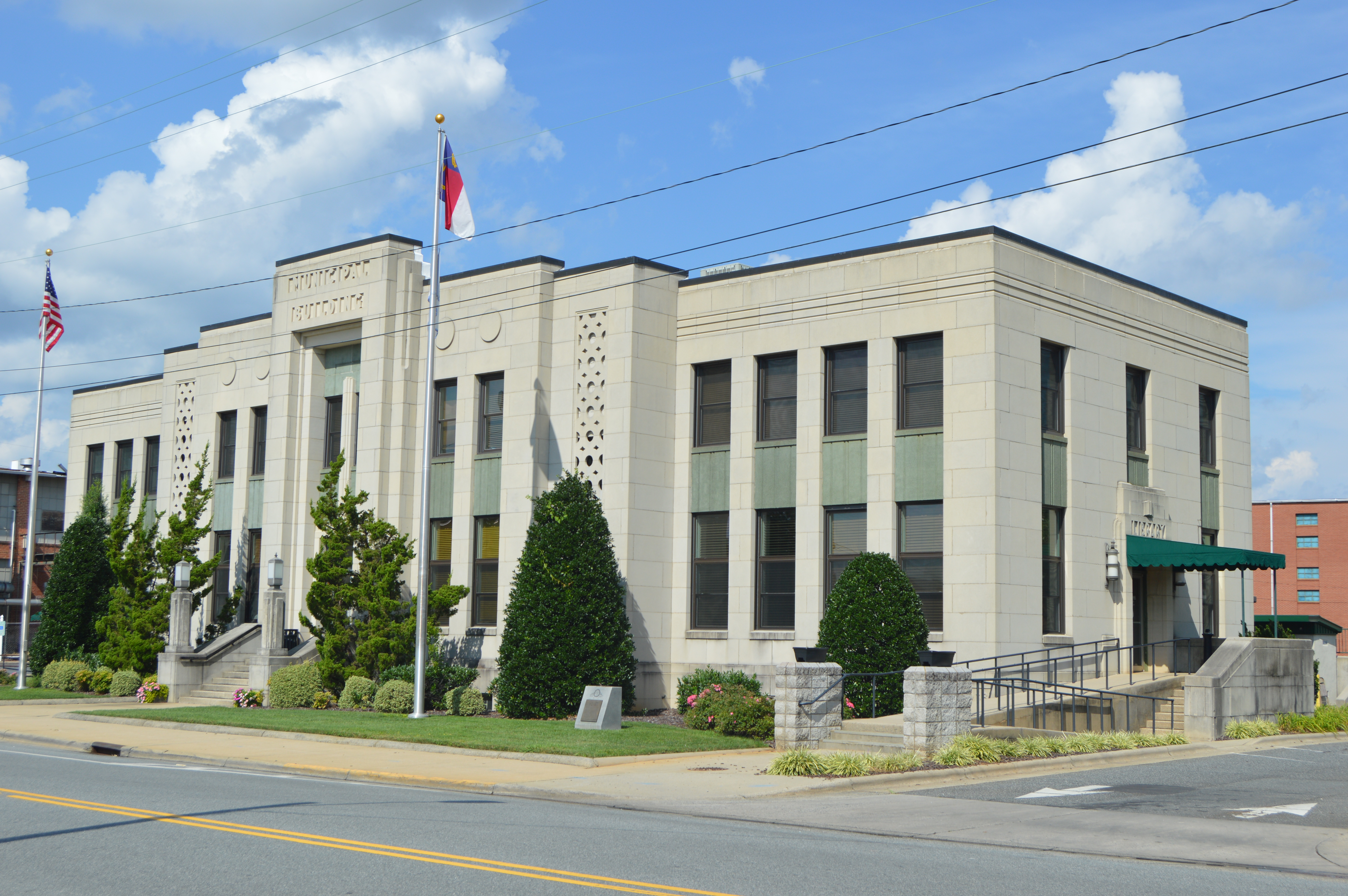
- Asheboro municipal building

- Seal
- Nickname: Zoo City
- Motto: "Exactly where you want to be."
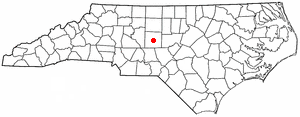
- Location of Asheboro, North Carolina

- Location within North Carolina Location within the United States Location within North America
- Coordinates: 35°42′57″N 79°48′46″W
- Country: United States
- State: North Carolina
- County: Randolph
- Incorporated: December 25, 1796
- Named for: Samuel Ashe

Government
  - Type: Council-manager
  - Body: Asheboro City Council
  - Mayor: Joey Trogdon
  - City Manager: Donald Duncan Jr.

Area
  - Total: 19.00 sq mi (49.20 km^{2})
  - Land: 18.90 sq mi (48.95 km^{2})
  - Water: 0.093 sq mi (0.24 km^{2})
- Elevation: 846 ft (258 m)

Population (2020)
  - Total: 27,156
  - Density: 1,436.7/sq mi (554.73/km^{2})
- Time zone: UTC−5 (Eastern (EST))
  - Summer (DST): UTC−4 (EDT)
- ZIP codes: 27203-27205
- Area code: 336-743
- FIPS code: 37-02080
- GNIS feature ID: 2403119
- Website: www.asheboronc.gov

Asheboro is a city in and the county seat of Randolph County, North Carolina, United States, inside the Greensboro-High Point Metropolitan Area of the Piedmont Triad. The population of the city was 27,156 at the 2020 census. It is and is home of the state-owned North Carolina Zoo.

== History ==
Asheboro was named after Samuel Ashe, the ninth governor of North Carolina (1795–1798), and became the county seat of Randolph County in 1796. It was a small village in the 1800s, with a population of less than 200 through the Civil War; its main function was housing the county courthouse, and the town was most active when court was in session. Asheboro's population only began to grow significantly following its connection to railroads: the High Point, Randleman, Asheboro and Southern Railroad first served the city in 1889, followed by the Montgomery Railroad in 1896.

Asheboro emerged as a textile production center in the 20th century with the opening of the Acme Hosiery Mills in 1909. After World War II, the city's manufacturing sector grew to include batteries, wires and food products. The city's main tourist attraction, the North Carolina Zoo, opened in 1974.

Asheboro suffered from an economic downturn in the 2000s due to a decline in its traditional manufacturing industries amid increasing competition from overseas; the national news program 60 Minutes described it as a "dying town" in 2012.

In recent years, Asheboro has experienced economic development and population growth, with projected continued job growth.

Housing rehabilitation projects are ensuring safer, more attractive housing for residents.

In 2015, Sunset Avenue in Downtown Asheboro was named a Great Main Street by the North Carolina Chapter of the American Planning Association.

In 2016, Asheboro received the All-America City Award, a prestigious award that honors communities developing innovative solutions to pressing problems. Asheboro received the award for its efforts to "ensure that all our children are healthy and successful in school and life."

=== Historic buildings ===
The following buildings in Asheboro are listed on the National Register of Historic Places:

- Acme-McCrary Hosiery Mills
- Asheboro Hosiery Mills and Cranford Furniture Company Complex
- Central School
- Wilson Kindley Farm and Kindley Mine
- Lewis-Thornburg Farm
- Mount Shepherd Pottery Site
- Randolph County Courthouse
- Sunset Theater
- Thayer Farm Site (31RD10)

== Geography ==
According to the United States Census Bureau, the city has a total area of 15.4 square miles (40 km^{2}), of which 15.3 square miles (40 km^{2}) is land and 0.1 square miles (0.26 km^{2}) (0.58%) is water. Asheboro is located in the considered-center of North Carolina, in which the Greensboro-High Point Metropolitian Area (which Asheboro is located in) have "grown" to be the Metropolitan Center of the state, however, debate on the exact center of North Carolina also revolves around the nearby municipality of Star, alongside the nearby location of Chatham County. While Asheboro is located in the Piedmont plateau region of central North Carolina, which is "considerably" east of the Appalachian Mountains, the town and surrounding area is noticeable "hilly." The town lies within the Uwharrie Mountains, a series of ancient ridges and monadnocks which have been have been considerably-detroriated by erosion to high hills. As such, Asheboro gives the impression of being in a more mountainous area in contrast to the description of the town.

=== Climate ===
The climate of Asheboro is a warm temperate climate (Cfa), with cool winters and hot summers.

Climate data for Asheboro, North Carolina(1991-2020 normals)
Month	Jan	Feb	Mar	Apr	May	Jun	Jul	Aug	Sep	Oct	Nov	Dec	Year
Record high °F (°C)	78 (26)	82 (28)	92 (33)	93 (34)	97 (36)	103 (39)	104 (40)	105 (41)	100 (38)	96 (36)	87 (31)	79 (26)	105 (41)
Mean daily maximum °F (°C)	50.0 (10.0)	54.2 (12.3)	62.0 (16.7)	71.5 (21.9)	78.0 (25.6)	84.8 (29.3)	88.3 (31.3)	86.5 (30.3)	80.6 (27.0)	71.2 (21.8)	61.0 (16.1)	52.8 (11.6)	70.1 (21.2)
Daily mean °F (°C)	39.7 (4.3)	43.2 (6.2)	50.3 (10.2)	59.1 (15.1)	66.6 (19.2)	74.0 (23.3)	77.7 (25.4)	76.2 (24.6)	70.1 (21.2)	59.5 (15.3)	49.4 (9.7)	42.6 (5.9)	59.0 (15.0)
Mean daily minimum °F (°C)	29.4 (−1.4)	32.1 (0.1)	38.6 (3.7)	46.7 (8.2)	55.2 (12.9)	63.2 (17.3)	67.0 (19.4)	65.9 (18.8)	59.6 (15.3)	47.8 (8.8)	37.7 (3.2)	32.4 (0.2)	48.0 (8.9)
Record low °F (°C)	−8 (−22)	2 (−17)	8 (−13)	25 (−4)	33 (1)	39 (4)	45 (7)	46 (8)	36 (2)	21 (−6)	10 (−12)	−1 (−18)	−8 (−22)
Average precipitation inches (mm)	3.95 (100)	3.22 (82)	4.09 (104)	3.94 (100)	3.76 (96)	4.08 (104)	4.18 (106)	3.87 (98)	4.84 (123)	3.50 (89)	3.55 (90)	3.64 (92)	46.62 (1,184)
Source: NOAA

== Demographics ==
Historical population
Census	Pop.	Note	%±
1850	176		—
1870	182		—
1880	299		64.3%
1890	510		70.6%
1900	992		94.5%
1910	1,865		88.0%
1920	2,559		37.2%
1930	5,021		96.2%
1940	6,981		39.0%
1950	7,701		10.3%
1960	9,449		22.7%
1970	10,797		14.3%
1980	15,252		41.3%
1990	16,362		7.3%
2000	21,672		32.5%
2010	25,012		15.4%
2020	27,156		8.6%
2025 (est.)	27,990	▲	3.1%
U.S. Decennial Census

=== 2020 census ===
As of the 2020 census, Asheboro had a population of 27,156 and 10,929 households, of which 6,130 were families.

The median age was 37.6 years. 24.2% of residents were under the age of 18 and 17.5% of residents were 65 years of age or older. For every 100 females there were 92.5 males, and for every 100 females age 18 and over there were 89.1 males age 18 and over.

96.5% of residents lived in urban areas, while 3.5% lived in rural areas.

There were 10,929 households in Asheboro, of which 31.6% had children under the age of 18 living in them. Of all households, 37.6% were married-couple households, 21.0% were households with a male householder and no spouse or partner present, and 34.2% were households with a female householder and no spouse or partner present. About 33.9% of all households were made up of individuals and 14.9% had someone living alone who was 65 years of age or older.

There were 11,855 housing units, of which 7.8% were vacant. The homeowner vacancy rate was 2.0% and the rental vacancy rate was 7.1%.

Racial composition as of the 2020 census
Race	Number	Percent
White	15,588	57.4%
Black or African American	3,342	12.3%
American Indian and Alaska Native	341	1.3%
Asian	372	1.4%
Native Hawaiian and Other Pacific Islander	5	0.0%
Some other race	4,579	16.9%
Two or more races	2,929	10.8%
Hispanic or Latino (of any race)	7,985	29.4%

=== 2000 census ===
As of the census of 2000, there were 21,672 people, 8,756 households, and 5,516 families residing in the city. The population density was 1,412.5 inhabitants per square mile (545.4/km^{2}). There were 9,515 housing units at an average density of 620.1 per square mile (239.4/km^{2}). The racial makeup of the city was 69.45% White, 12.08% African American, 0.51% Native American, 1.39% Asian, 0.01% Pacific Islander, 7.72% from other races, and 1.80% from two or more races. Hispanic or Latino of any race were 30.9% of the population.

There were 8,756 households, out of which 30.2% had children under the age of 18 living with them, 45.9% were married couples living together, 12.5% had a female householder with no husband present, and 37.0% were non-families. 31.6% of all households were made up of individuals, and 12.8% had someone living alone who was 65 years of age or older. The average household size was 2.40 and the average family size was 3.01.

In the city, the population was spread out, with 24.1% under the age of 18, 10.5% from 18 to 24, 30.7% from 25 to 44, 19.6% from 45 to 64, and 15.1% who were 65 years of age or older. The median age was 34 years. For every 100 females, there were 95.8 males. For every 100 females age 18 and over, there were 93.1 males.

== Economy ==
=== Top employers ===
According to Asheboro's 2024 Annual Comprehensive Financial Report, the top employers in the city were:

#	Employer	# of Employees
1	Technimark	1,500
2	Randolph Health	726
3	Asheboro City Schools	550
4	North Carolina Zoo	440
5	Energizer Battery	405
6	City of Asheboro	383
7	ORIGIN/Fox Apparell Inc	249
8	Post Consumer Brands	230
9	Bossong Hosiery	225
10	Oliver Rubber Company	195

In October 2012 Hyosung USA announced the closure of the Asheboro wire plant and loss of 310 jobs. Built by Goodyear and acquired by Hyosung in 2011, the plant makes wires for use in car and truck tires.

Black & Decker Corp was one of the main employers in the mid 1990s; one of its products, the SnakeLight, sold millions after being introduced in late 1994. The plant employed about 1,100 workers in 1998 and was one of the three biggest employers in Randolph County.

== Culture ==
=== Sports ===
- Asheboro is home to the Asheboro ZooKeepers of the Coastal Plain League, a collegiate summer baseball league. The ZooKeepers play at McCrary Park in Asheboro.
- Caraway Speedway, a Whelen Southern Modified Tour racing location.
- Lake Reese, a 900 acre lake that hosts fishing tournaments.

=== Retail ===
Asheboro Mall opened in 1982.

== Transportation ==
Routes include U.S. Route 220 and Interstate 73/Interstate 74, which connect it to Greensboro, U.S. Route 64 bypasses most of Asheboro to the south, while it goes through more of the city limits as a separate business route. U.S. 64 also connects the city to Raleigh, and North Carolina Highway 49, which connects the city to Charlotte.

Asheboro Regional Airport serves general aviation traffic to and from the city. The closest airport with scheduled passenger service is Piedmont Triad International Airport in Greensboro.

== Education ==
Asheboro City Schools operates public schools serving the city.

Fayetteville Street Christian School, located in Asheboro, is the largest private school in Randolph County.

In addition the Randolph County Schools has its headquarters in Asheboro.

== Notable people ==
- Charles Aaron, music journalist and editor
- Sam Ard, former NASCAR driver; 1983 and 1984 Nascar Busch Series Champion
- William Johnston Armfield, business executive and philanthropist
- Scott Bankhead, MLB and 1984 US Olympic Team pitcher
- Chuck Bown, former NASCAR driver; 1990 Nascar Busch Series Champion
- Lane Caudell, musician and actor
- Keith Crisco, businessman and public official
- William Cicero Hammer, U.S. Congressional Representative Democrat from 1921 to 1930
- Nick Coe, professional football defensive lineman
- Sean Patrick Goble, serial killer
- Jen Hamilton, nurse, author, and social media personality
- Andy Headen, former NFL linebacker for the New York Giants, Super Bowl XXI champion
- Randy Henderson, Mayor of Fort Myers, Florida from 2009-2020
- Pat Hurley, member of the North Carolina House of Representatives
- Mark Kemp, music journalist and author
- Elizabeth Lail, actress, known for her role as Guinevere Beck in You
- Paul Martin Newby, justice on the North Carolina Supreme Court
- Reynolds Price, novelist, essayist and educator, resident of the town in the 1930s and 1940s
- Julius Ramsay, Emmy-nominated television director and editor
- Marmaduke Swaim Robins, lawyer, private secretary to the civil war era governor, state legislator, and newspaperman
- Joe Spinks, professional basketball player
- Jonathan Worth, North Carolina Governor from 1865 to 1868 during early Reconstruction
