= Rock Mills, Alabama =

- CDP
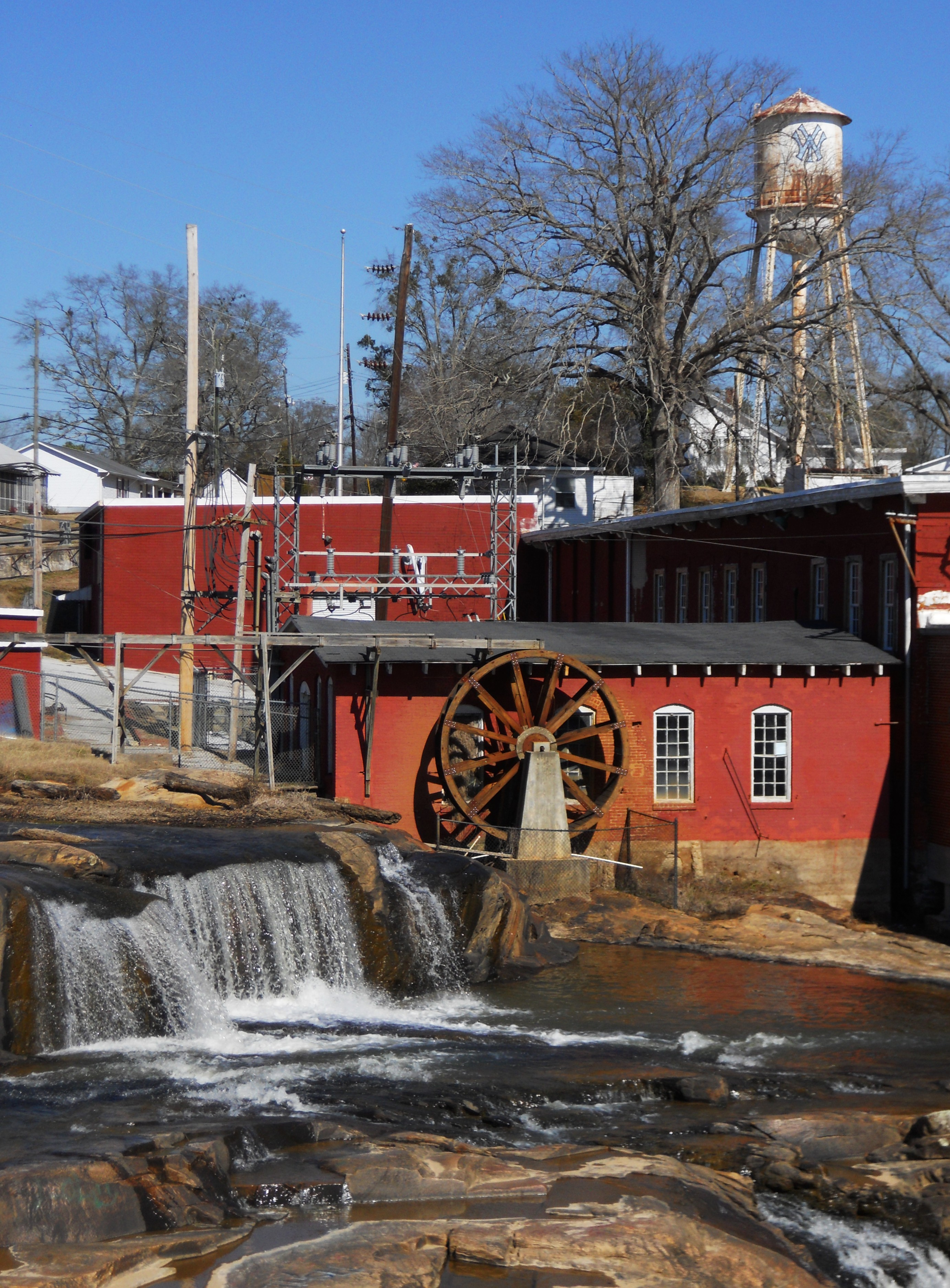
- Wehadkee Creek at Rock Mills. Winter 2011.

- Location in Randolph County and the state of Alabama
- Coordinates: 33°09′23″N 85°17′10″W
- Country: United States
- State: Alabama
- County: Randolph

Area
  - Total: 6.33 sq mi (16.39 km^{2})
  - Land: 6.32 sq mi (16.38 km^{2})
  - Water: 0.0039 sq mi (0.01 km^{2})
- Elevation: 692 ft (211 m)

Population (2020)
  - Total: 603
  - Density: 95.3/sq mi (36.81/km^{2})
- Time zone: UTC-6 (Central (CST))
  - Summer (DST): UTC-5 (CDT)
- ZIP code: 36274
- Area code: 334
- FIPS code: 01-65592
- GNIS feature ID: 2403487

Rock Mills is a census-designated place (CDP) in Randolph County, Alabama, United States. As of the 2020 census, Rock Mills had a population of 603. According to the U.S. Census, from 1890 until the 1920s, Rock Mills was an incorporated community. It was later designated a CDP beginning in 2000.

== Geography ==
According to the U.S. Census Bureau, the CDP has a total area of 6.3 square miles (16 km^{2}), all land.

=== Climate ===
Climate data for Rock Mills, Alabama, 1991–2020 normals, extremes 1941–present
Month	Jan	Feb	Mar	Apr	May	Jun	Jul	Aug	Sep	Oct	Nov	Dec	Year
Record high °F (°C)	83 (28)	83 (28)	88 (31)	92 (33)	98 (37)	105 (41)	107 (42)	104 (40)	100 (38)	99 (37)	86 (30)	80 (27)	107 (42)
Mean maximum °F (°C)	71.3 (21.8)	74.7 (23.7)	82.3 (27.9)	86.1 (30.1)	91.0 (32.8)	95.4 (35.2)	96.5 (35.8)	96.4 (35.8)	92.6 (33.7)	87.4 (30.8)	79.4 (26.3)	72.6 (22.6)	98.4 (36.9)
Mean daily maximum °F (°C)	54.2 (12.3)	60.0 (15.6)	67.6 (19.8)	75.3 (24.1)	82.3 (27.9)	87.4 (30.8)	88.7 (31.5)	88.8 (31.6)	84.6 (29.2)	75.0 (23.9)	64.8 (18.2)	57.1 (13.9)	73.8 (23.2)
Daily mean °F (°C)	43.2 (6.2)	47.9 (8.8)	54.7 (12.6)	61.6 (16.4)	69.6 (20.9)	76.1 (24.5)	78.1 (25.6)	78.1 (25.6)	72.9 (22.7)	62.2 (16.8)	52.1 (11.2)	45.8 (7.7)	61.9 (16.6)
Mean daily minimum °F (°C)	32.2 (0.1)	35.7 (2.1)	41.8 (5.4)	47.9 (8.8)	56.8 (13.8)	64.8 (18.2)	67.5 (19.7)	67.5 (19.7)	61.1 (16.2)	49.4 (9.7)	39.5 (4.2)	34.6 (1.4)	49.9 (9.9)
Mean minimum °F (°C)	13.1 (−10.5)	19.6 (−6.9)	23.3 (−4.8)	30.6 (−0.8)	41.2 (5.1)	54.2 (12.3)	58.9 (14.9)	58.1 (14.5)	47.2 (8.4)	31.0 (−0.6)	22.3 (−5.4)	17.7 (−7.9)	11.7 (−11.3)
Record low °F (°C)	0 (−18)	6 (−14)	11 (−12)	24 (−4)	31 (−1)	42 (6)	51 (11)	47 (8)	32 (0)	21 (−6)	6 (−14)	−1 (−18)	−1 (−18)
Average precipitation inches (mm)	5.27 (134)	5.34 (136)	5.23 (133)	4.37 (111)	4.11 (104)	4.85 (123)	4.47 (114)	4.02 (102)	3.39 (86)	2.78 (71)	4.12 (105)	5.08 (129)	53.03 (1,348)
Average precipitation days (≥ 0.01 in)	9.6	9.3	8.7	8.0	7.5	9.8	11.0	9.2	6.3	5.9	5.9	9.2	100.4
Source 1: NOAA
Source 2: National Weather Service

== Demographics ==
Historical population
Census	Pop.	Note	%±
1890	385		—
1900	420		9.1%
1910	349		−16.9%
1920	267		−23.5%
2000	676		—
2010	600		−11.2%
2020	603		0.5%
U.S. Decennial Census

Rock Mills first appeared as a census designated place in the 2000 U.S. Census.

=== 2020 census ===
Rock Mills CDP, Alabama – Racial and ethnic composition Note: the US Census treats Hispanic/Latino as an ethnic category. This table excludes Latinos from the racial categories and assigns them to a separate category. Hispanics/Latinos may be of any race.
Race / Ethnicity (NH = Non-Hispanic)	Pop 2000	Pop 2010	Pop 2020	% 2000	% 2010	% 2020
White alone (NH)	650	574	551	96.15%	95.67%	91.38%
Black or African American alone (NH)	15	9	12	2.22%	1.50%	1.99%
Native American or Alaska Native alone (NH)	0	0	0	0.00%	0.00%	0.00%
Asian alone (NH)	0	0	2	0.00%	0.00%	0.33%
Native Hawaiian or Pacific Islander alone (NH)	0	0	0	0.00%	0.00%	0.00%
Other race alone (NH)	0	0	6	0.00%	0.00%	1.00%
Mixed race or Multiracial (NH)	0	6	25	0.00%	1.00%	4.15%
Hispanic or Latino (any race)	11	11	7	1.63%	1.83%	1.16%
Total	676	600	603	100.00%	100.00%	100.00%

=== 2000 census ===
As of the census of 2000, there were 676 people, 282 households, and 192 families residing in the CDP. The population density was 106.8 inhabitants per square mile (41.2/km^{2}). There were 313 housing units at an average density of 49.4 per square mile (19.1/km^{2}). The racial makeup of the CDP was 97.63% White, 2.22% Black or African American, 0.15% from other races. 1.63% of the population were Hispanic or Latino of any race.

There were 282 households, out of which 29.8% had children under the age of 18 living with them, 53.9% were married couples living together, 10.6% had a female householder with no husband present, and 31.9% were non-families. 27.7% of all households were made up of individuals, and 14.2% had someone living alone who was 65 years of age or older. The average household size was 2.40 and the average family size was 2.93.

In the CDP, the population was spread out, with 24.7% under the age of 18, 8.6% from 18 to 24, 28.1% from 25 to 44, 23.4% from 45 to 64, and 15.2% who were 65 years of age or older. The median age was 38 years. For every 100 females, there were 87.8 males. For every 100 females age 18 and over, there were 89.2 males.

The median income for a household in the CDP was $40,714, and the median income for a family was $48,393. Males had a median income of $31,944 versus $20,117 for females. The per capita income for the CDP was $13,093. About 12.3% of families and 16.2% of the population were below the poverty line, including 15.4% of those under age 18 and 52.3% of those age 65 or over.

== Rock Mills Industry ==
Wehadkee Mill was a yarn and twine mill which until recent times made yarn, twine and employed a steady number of Rock Mills employees for many decades. Wehadkee Mill closed down in May of 2004.

== Rock Mills Pottery ==
In town and nearby (communities of Bacon Level, Alabama and old Cedric, Alabama) was also a larger pottery community making esp. urns, churns, jugs for whiskey, molasses, sugar, milk and the water pitchers and washing bowls needed in every home. These potters still widely known today. And potters from this location moved further West to Mississippi and Texas. The immigration road to the West (to Mississippi, Arkansas, esp Texas) passed along here and so this pottery industry allowed immigrants to buy needed urns, churns, pots for storage. Local potters included well known Pittman Brothers, Boggs Family, WD Pound and Jessie Weathers.
