= Liberty Grove =

Liberty Grove may be:

== Places ==
Australia

- Liberty Grove, New South Wales, a suburb in Sydney, Australia

United States

- Liberty Grove, Alabama
- Liberty Grove, Maryland
- Liberty Grove, Tennessee
- Liberty Grove, Dallas County, Texas
- Liberty Grove, Delta County, Texas
- Liberty Grove, Wisconsin, town
