= Woodland, Alabama =

- Town
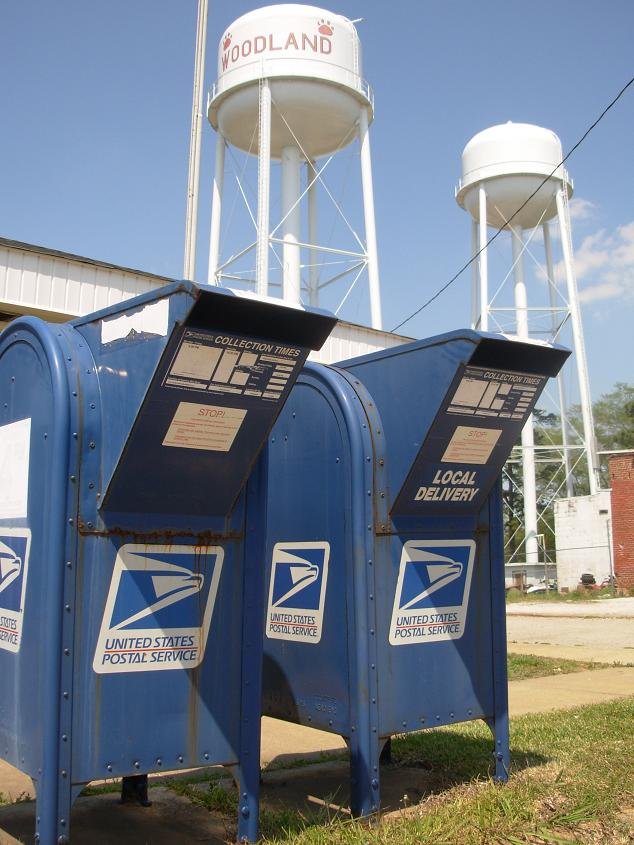
- Water tower and mailboxes, Woodland, Alabama.

- Location of Woodland in Randolph County, Alabama.
- Coordinates: 33°22′25″N 85°23′51″W
- Country: United States
- State: Alabama
- County: Randolph
- Established: 1965

Area
  - Total: 1.56 sq mi (4.04 km^{2})
  - Land: 1.56 sq mi (4.04 km^{2})
  - Water: 0 sq mi (0.00 km^{2})
- Elevation: 1,086 ft (331 m)

Population (2020)
  - Total: 221
  - Density: 141.8/sq mi (54.75/km^{2})
- Time zone: UTC-6 (CST)
  - Summer (DST): UTC-5 (CDT)
- ZIP code: 36280
- Area code: 256
- FIPS code: 01-83400
- GNIS feature ID: 2406911
- Website: townofwoodlandal.com

Woodland is a town in Randolph County, Alabama, United States. As of the 2020 census, Woodland had a population of 221. It incorporated in 1967.

== Geography ==
The town is located along Alabama State Route 48 northeast of the Randolph County seat of Wedowee. AL-48 leads northeast 10 mi (16 km) to its end at the Alabama-Georgia state line, and southwest 9 mi (14 km) to Wedowee.

According to the U.S. Census Bureau, the town has a total area of 1.1 square miles (2.8 km^{2}), all land.

== Demographics ==
Historical population
Census	Pop.	Note	%±
1970	177		—
1980	192		8.5%
1990	189		−1.6%
2000	192		1.6%
2010	184		−4.2%
2020	221		20.1%
U.S. Decennial Census; 2013 Estimate

As of the census of 2000, there were 192 people, 82 households, and 56 families residing in the town. The population density was 170.6 inhabitants per square mile (65.9/km^{2}). There were 90 housing units at an average density of 80.0 per square mile (30.9/km^{2}). The racial makeup of the town was 88.54% White and 11.46% Black or African American.

There were 82 households, out of which 36.6% had children under the age of 18 living with them, 51.2% were married couples living together, 17.1% had a female householder with no husband present, and 30.5% were non-families. 30.5% of all households were made up of individuals, and 12.2% had someone living alone who was 65 years of age or older. The average household size was 2.34 and the average family size was 2.89.

The median income for a household in the town was $31,500, and the median income for a family was $41,250. Males had a median income of $43,750 versus $24,375 for females. The per capita income for the town was $17,106. About 15.2% of families and 14.9% of the population were below the poverty line, including 22.7% of those under the age of 18 and 5.4% of those 65 or over.

== Notable person ==
- Vern Gosdin - country and gospel singer

== Photo gallery ==
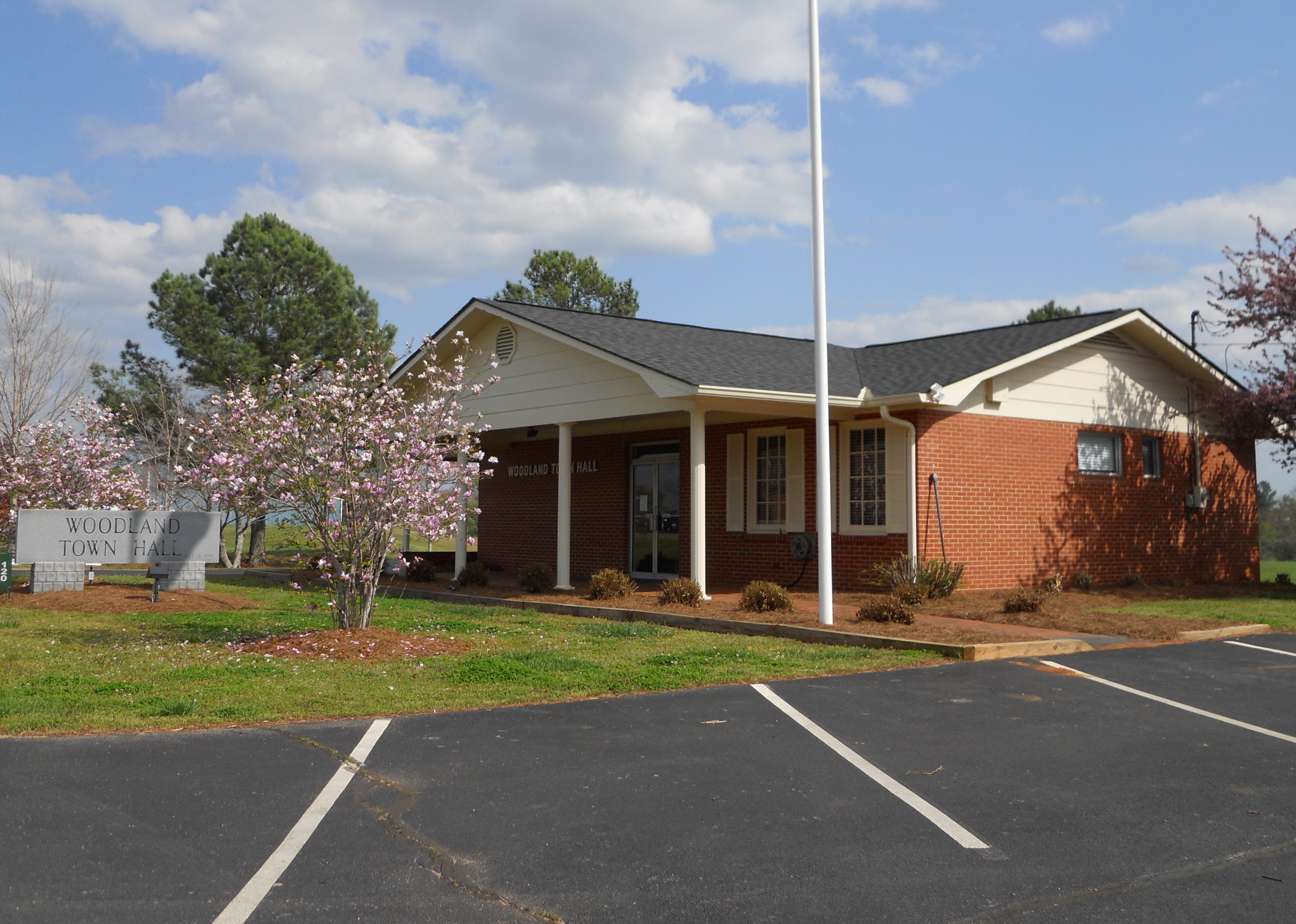
Woodland Town Hall

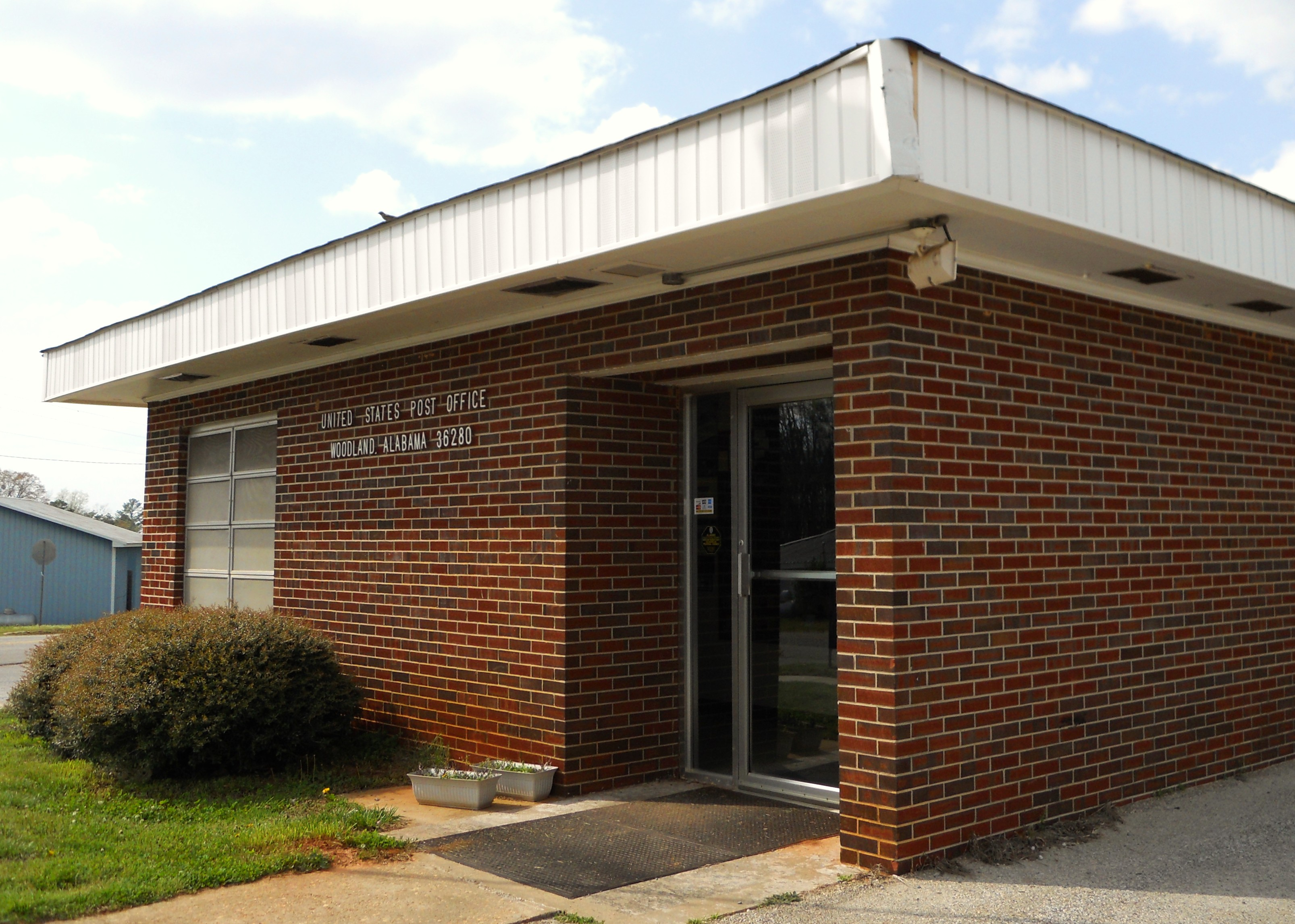
Woodland Post Office (zip code: 36280)

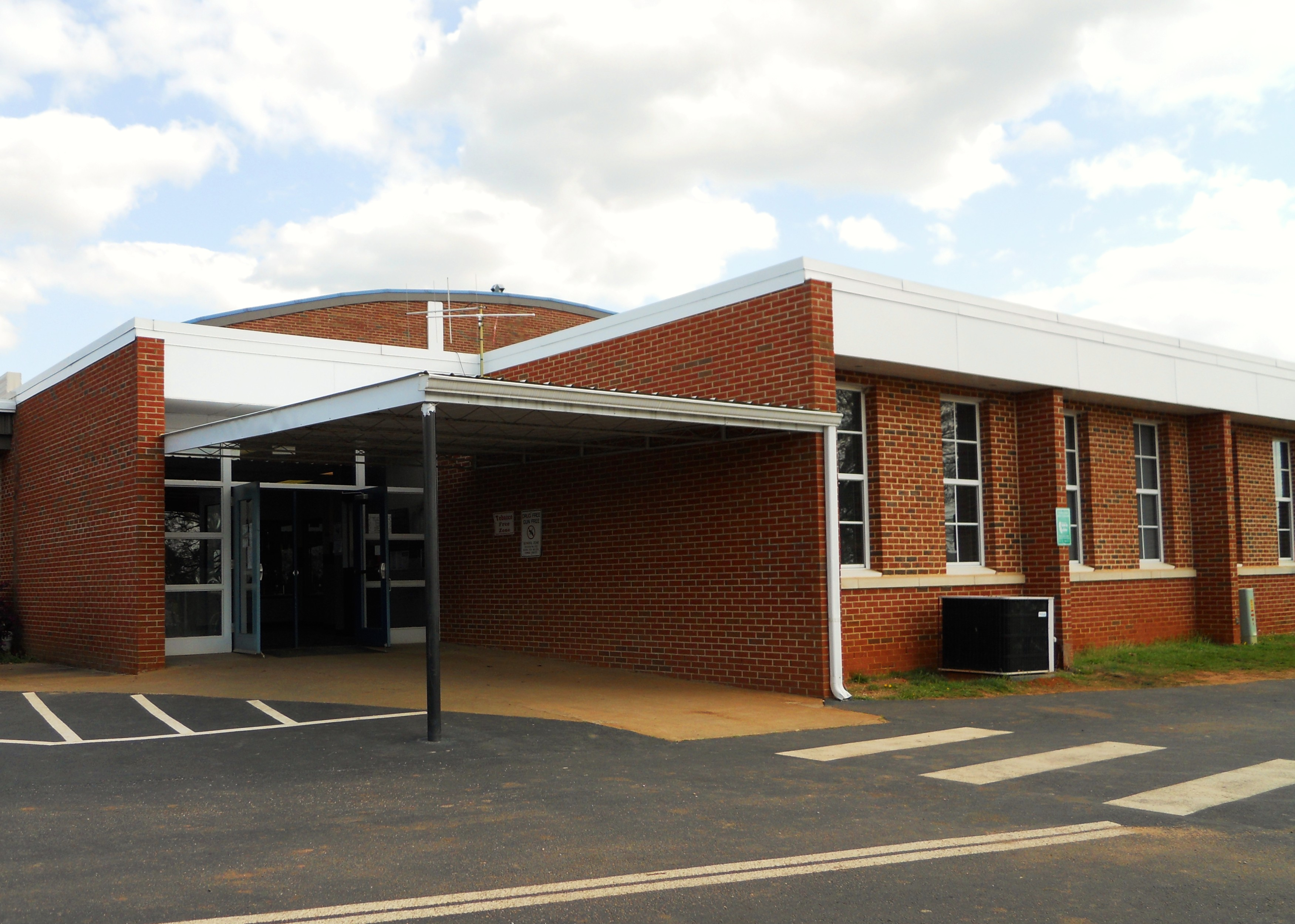
Woodland High School, "Home of the Bobcats".

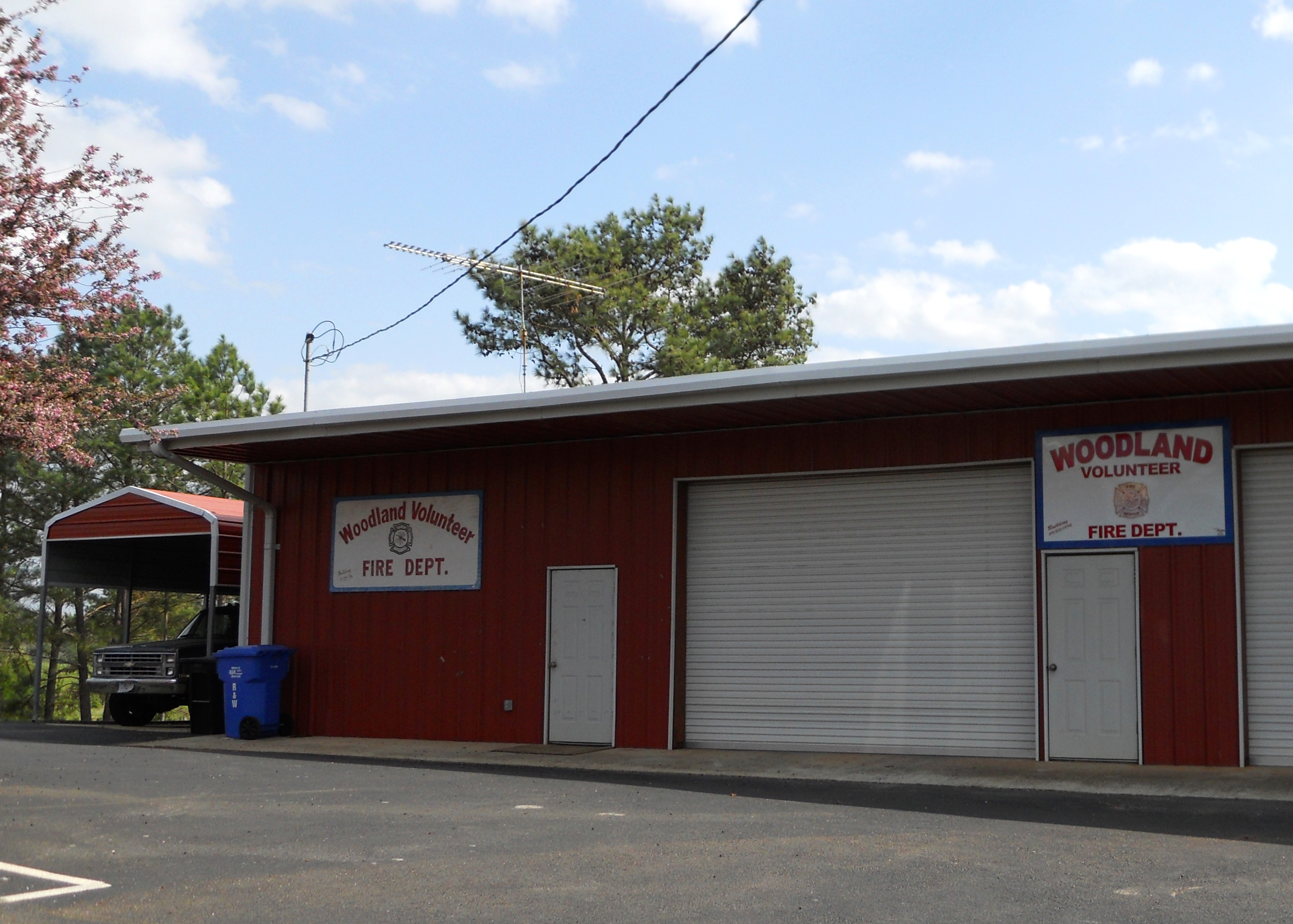
Woodland Volunteer Fire Department

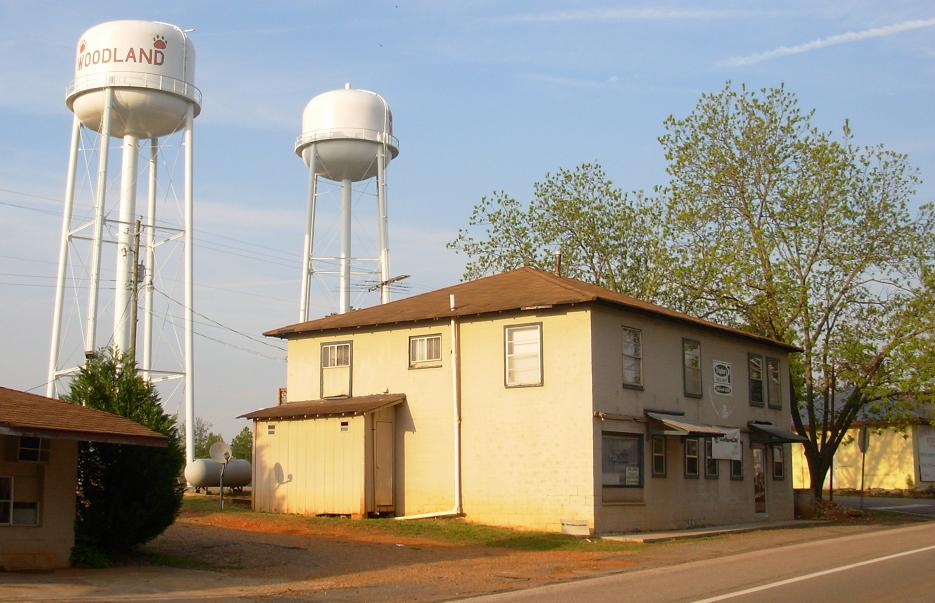
Woodland's most distinctive landmarks are the twin water towers which are positioned in the middle of town.

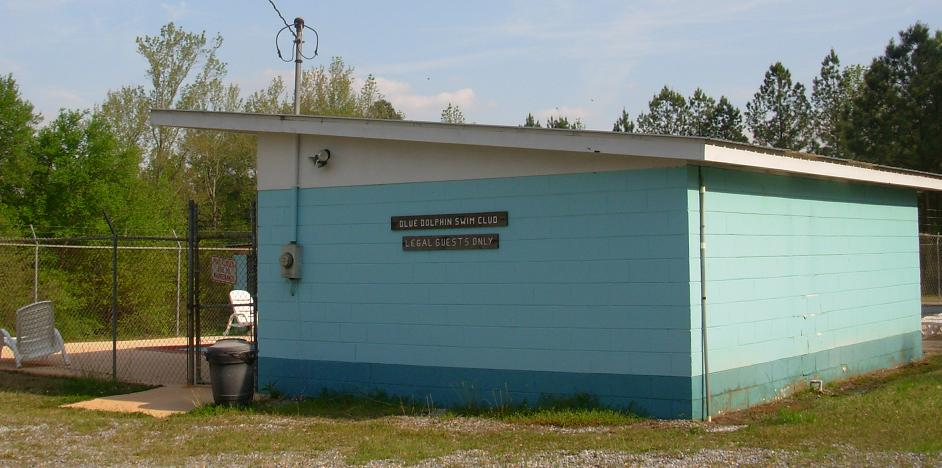
The Blue Dolphin Swim Club

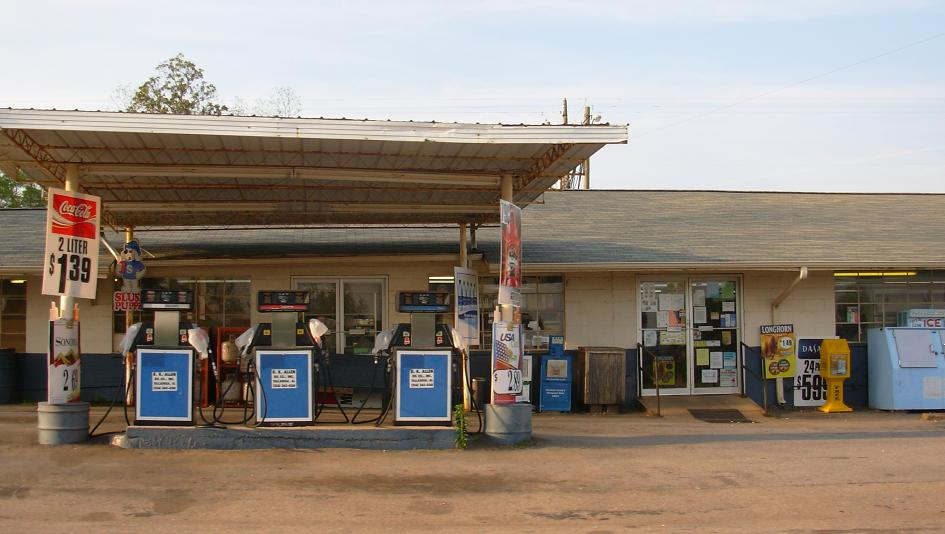
Bee's Grocery serves as the town's primary grocery store.

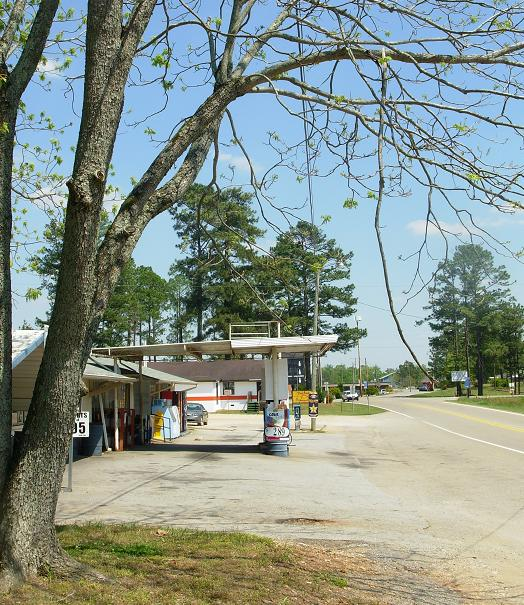
Alabama State Route 48 as seen from Downtown Woodland, Alabama.

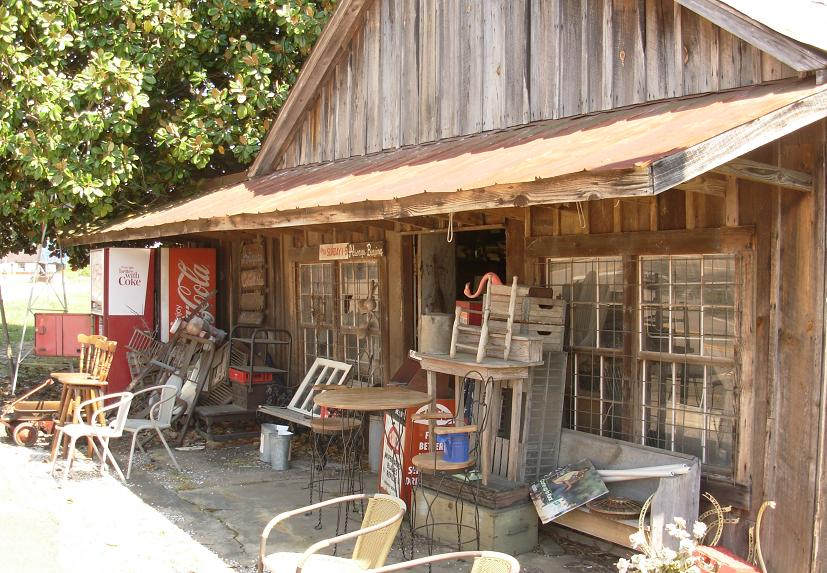
An antique shop in Woodland, Alabama.

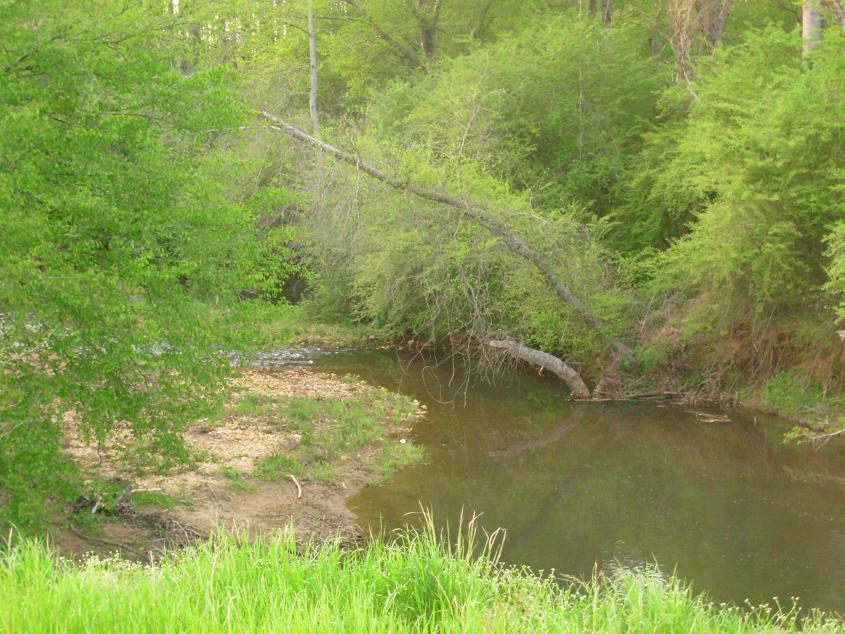
Bear Creek runs southwest of Woodland, Alabama
