= Hobson, Alabama =

Hobson, Alabama may refer to:

- Hobson, Jefferson County, Alabama
- Hobson, Randolph County, Alabama, an unincorporated community
- Hobson, Washington County, Alabama, a census-designated place
- Hobson City, Alabama, a town
