= Newell, Alabama =

Unincorporated community in Alabama, United States

- Unincorporated community
- Location within Alabama Location within the United States
- Coordinates: 33°25′59″N 85°26′01″W
- Country: United States
- State: Alabama
- County: Randolph
- Elevation: 902 ft (275 m)
- Time zone: UTC-6 (Central (CST))
  - Summer (DST): UTC-5 (CDT)
- Area codes: 256 & 938
- GNIS feature ID: 156792

Newell is an unincorporated community in Randolph County, Alabama, United States, located 11.5 miles (18.5 km) north-northeast of Wedowee.

== History ==
Newell was named after the family of W. P. Newell, who was elected as sheriff of Randolph County in 1845. Newell also served as a member of the Alabama House of Representatives from 1853 to 1855. He later served as the mayor of Camp Hill, Alabama.

A post office was established under the name Newell in 1887. The post office was closed on October 5, 2002.
