= Lineville, Alabama =

City in Alabama, United States

Lineville
- City
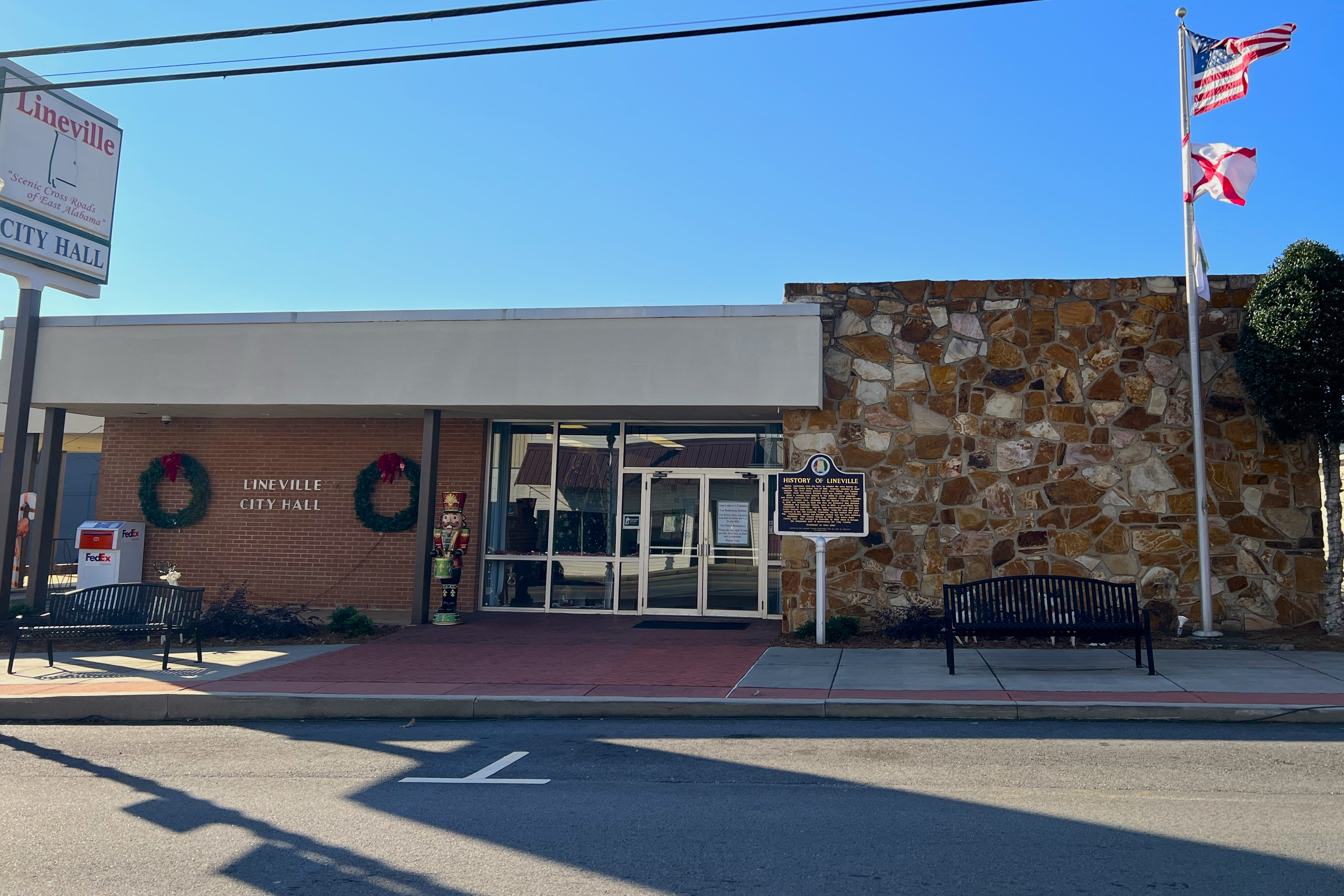
- Lineville City Hall

- Flag Logo

- Location of Lineville in Clay County, Alabama.
- Coordinates: 33°18′44″N 85°44′40″W
- Country: United States
- State: Alabama
- County: Clay

Area
  - Total: 9.74 sq mi (25.23 km^{2})
  - Land: 9.67 sq mi (25.04 km^{2})
  - Water: 0.073 sq mi (0.19 km^{2})
- Elevation: 1,073 ft (327 m)

Population (2020)
  - Total: 2,489
  - Density: 257/sq mi (99.4/km^{2})
- Time zone: UTC-6 (Central (CST))
  - Summer (DST): UTC-5 (CDT)
- ZIP code: 36266
- Area code: 256
- FIPS code: 01-43264
- GNIS feature ID: 2404935
- Website: www.cityoflinevilleal.com

Lineville is a city in Clay County, Alabama, United States. At the 2020 census, the population was 2,489.

== History ==
Native Americans were the first to inhabit the area now known as Lineville. The Creek Indian War of 1813, however, resulted in their removal. The first white settlers in the area were William and Thomas Lundie. Their settlement became known as Lundie's Cross Roads after a trading post opened in the 1830s to serve pioneers and miners searching for gold. In 1856, Lundie's Cross Roads became known as County Line, probably for the Baptist Church, founded in 1848 and located on what was then the boundary line between Talladega and Randolph counties. Also in 1856, a post office was established in County Line, schools were consolidated and corn and cotton became cash crops.

The Town of (Crooked Creek) Lineville was built on what was at that time the dividing line between Talladega and Randolph Counties, hence the name, Lineville. John H. Ingram, Sr. of Lineville, Alabama furnishes the following early history: “Crooked Creek Baptist Church, later Lineville, was organized in 1839 and built one and one quarter miles west of the town of Lineville about 200 yards northwest of the home of Frank Pittard; and the first literary school of the community was nearby. Some years later the church was moved a short distance and a house was built on the left side of the public road near the residence of the late Thomas H. Harris. In about 1863 the church was moved into the town of Lineville and a house built just west of the present grammar school building; the name was changed to Lineville Baptist Church in 1881 and legally incorporated in 1912; the first Circuit Court that was held in the new County of Clay, was held in the Lineville Baptist Church in 1867, with John Henderson of Talladega, Alabama, as a judge. The present new brick building was built in 1915 and 1916, with the first service held on March 1st, 1916, with prayer and thanksgiving service conducted by J.H. Ingram, Sr., and C.N. James, pastor.”

One of the newest attractions in Clay County in the 1920s, was the chicken business. Millions of chickens and eggs and long chicken houses In or about 1921, Reverend Secelar Claxton Ray took one hundred, day-old chicks to the Clay County Fair and put them under an oil burning brooder and called attention to the advantage of using chickens on the farm to supplement the ‘all cotton’ cash crop. This was something new, but it did gradually got the attention of the local farmers. He was now fully in the poultry business, and named it Goodwill Poultry Farm and Hatchery. He bought houses then idle at the local graphite mines in Clay County and hired neighbors in their spare time and built the hatchery and chicken houses and an extra tenant house on the farm, southeast of Ashland, Alabama, whose population of close to one thousand had grown considerably from two hundred in 1881.

The Civil War saw some 56 area men interred in the Old Lineville Cemetery. By the end of the war, Confederate money had become useless and the area suffered hardships. Clay County formed in 1866. The town's name was officially changed to Lineville in 1870 when it became the temporary seat of government for Clay County.

The press came to Lineville in 1884. In 1898, Lineville was incorporated, graphite mining became a major industry and National Bank began operating there. A secondary college opened in Lineville in 1891 with H.J. Willingham, president and first appointed mayor. In 1907 the first railroad began operating in Lineville; the timber and lumber industry expanded; and mandated high schools opened. Lineville received water and electricity in 1917. The Lineville water tank is listed on the Alabama Register of Landmarks and Heritage.

== Geography ==
Lineville is located northeast of the center of Clay County.

Alabama State Routes 9, 48, and 49 are the main routes through the city. AL-9 runs through the downtown area, leading northeast 28 mi (45 km) to Heflin along Interstate 20 and southwest 6 mi (9.7 km) to Ashland, the Clay County seat. AL-48 begins in the eastern part of the city and leads east 16 mi (26 km) to Wedowee. AL-49 also runs through the downtown area, leading north 14 mi (23 km) to its end in Cheaha State Park and south 17 mi (27 km) to Goldville.

According to the U.S. Census Bureau, the city has a total area of 9.0 square miles (23.3 km^{2}), of which 9.0 square miles (23.2 km^{2}) is land and 0.08 square miles (0.2 km^{2}), or 0.77%, is water.

Lineville was named for its location on what was then the border between Talladega and Randolph counties.

Alabama's highest point, Mount Cheaha, is located 18 miles (29 km) north of Lineville via Alabama Highway 49.

=== Climate ===
According to the Köppen climate classification, Lineville has a humid subtropical climate (abbreviated Cfa).

Climate data for Lineville, 1991–2020 simulated normals (1050 ft elevation)
Month	Jan	Feb	Mar	Apr	May	Jun	Jul	Aug	Sep	Oct	Nov	Dec	Year
Mean daily maximum °F (°C)	53.8 (12.1)	57.4 (14.1)	65.5 (18.6)	73.0 (22.8)	79.9 (26.6)	86.0 (30.0)	88.7 (31.5)	88.0 (31.1)	83.3 (28.5)	74.5 (23.6)	64.2 (17.9)	55.9 (13.3)	72.5 (22.5)
Daily mean °F (°C)	42.6 (5.9)	45.9 (7.7)	52.7 (11.5)	60.3 (15.7)	68.0 (20.0)	74.8 (23.8)	78.1 (25.6)	77.5 (25.3)	72.0 (22.2)	61.9 (16.6)	51.6 (10.9)	45.1 (7.3)	60.9 (16.0)
Mean daily minimum °F (°C)	31.6 (−0.2)	34.5 (1.4)	40.1 (4.5)	47.3 (8.5)	55.9 (13.3)	63.9 (17.7)	67.6 (19.8)	67.1 (19.5)	60.8 (16.0)	49.3 (9.6)	39.2 (4.0)	34.3 (1.3)	49.3 (9.6)
Average precipitation inches (mm)	5.52 (140.17)	5.30 (134.57)	5.65 (143.39)	4.89 (124.24)	4.63 (117.69)	4.86 (123.54)	4.62 (117.31)	4.67 (118.51)	3.96 (100.52)	3.39 (86.01)	4.84 (122.96)	5.78 (146.82)	58.11 (1,475.73)
Average dew point °F (°C)	33.4 (0.8)	36.1 (2.3)	41.5 (5.3)	49.1 (9.5)	58.8 (14.9)	66.2 (19.0)	69.4 (20.8)	68.9 (20.5)	63.7 (17.6)	53.1 (11.7)	42.4 (5.8)	37.0 (2.8)	51.6 (10.9)
Source: Prism Climate Group

== Demographics ==
Historical population
Census	Pop.	Note	%±
1890	234		—
1900	211		−9.8%
1910	1,053		399.1%
1920	1,507		43.1%
1930	1,329		−11.8%
1940	1,300		−2.2%
1950	1,548		19.1%
1960	1,612		4.1%
1970	1,984		23.1%
1980	2,257		13.8%
1990	2,394		6.1%
2000	2,401		0.3%
2010	2,395		−0.2%
2020	2,489		3.9%
U.S. Decennial Census; 2013 Estimate

=== 2020 census ===
As of the 2020 census, Lineville had a population of 2,489 and 1,033 households, of which 600 were families. The median age was 40.9 years; 23.9% of residents were under the age of 18 and 22.3% were 65 years of age or older. For every 100 females there were 88.8 males, and for every 100 females age 18 and over there were 84.3 males age 18 and over.

0.0% of residents lived in urban areas, while 100.0% lived in rural areas.

There were 1,033 households in Lineville, of which 34.2% had children under the age of 18 living in them. Of all households, 38.9% were married-couple households, 19.1% were households with a male householder and no spouse or partner present, and 34.8% were households with a female householder and no spouse or partner present. About 29.7% of all households were made up of individuals and 14.0% had someone living alone who was 65 years of age or older.

There were 1,170 housing units, of which 11.7% were vacant. The homeowner vacancy rate was 0.9% and the rental vacancy rate was 7.6%.

Lineville racial composition
Race	Num.	Perc.
White	1,436	57.7%
Black or African American	826	33.2%
Native American	9	0.4%
Asian	2	0.1%
Pacific Islander	2	0.1%
Other/Mixed	69	2.8%
Two or more races	145	5.8%
Hispanic or Latino (of any race)	123	4.9%

=== 2010 census ===
As of the census of 2010, there were 2,395 people, 967 households, and 655 families residing in the city. The population density was 268 inhabitants per square mile (103/km^{2}). There were 1,119 housing units at an average density of 122 per square mile (47/km^{2}). The racial makeup of the city was 58.6% White, 36.9% Black or African American, 0.3% Native American, 0.2% Asian, 0.0% Pacific Islander, 1.5% from other races, and 2.6% from two or more races. 4.6% of the population were Hispanic or Latino of any race.

There were 967 households, out of which 28.3% had children under the age of 18 living with them, 41.4% were married couples living together, 21.8% had a female householder with no husband present, and 32.3% were non-families. 29.3% of all households were made up of individuals, and 11.6% had someone living alone who was 65 years of age or older. The average household size was 2.37 and the average family size was 2.89.

In the city, the population was spread out, with 24.4% under the age of 18, 8.2% from 18 to 24, 21.9% from 25 to 44, 25.6% from 45 to 64, and 19.8% who were 65 years of age or older. The median age was 40.9 years. For every 100 females, there were 87.5 males. For every 100 females age 18 and over, there were 85.2 males.

The median income for a household in the city was $22,778, and the median income for a family was $35,179. Males had a median income of $31,639 versus $26,964 for females. The per capita income for the city was $16,952. About 30.1% of families and 28.2% of the population were below the poverty line, including 36.6% of those under age 18 and 6.7% of those age 65 or over.

== Education ==
Lineville Academy began in 1856. The first red school house was built soon after with an additional school added later. The Lineville Institute opened in 1883 but closed a year later in 1884.

Lineville College, a coeducational institution for white students, was founded in 1890 in Lineville, incorporated in 1891 and disestablished in 1903.

In 1917, the old Springhill Black School was replaced with a new building named Clay County Training School. In 1929, during the Great Depression, Lineville families lost farms and many businesses failed. A new factory began operation in Lineville in 1946 and in 1949, a new hospital was built there.

== Notable people ==
- Robert Daniel Carmichael, mathematician for whom Carmichael numbers are named, attended Lineville College
- Byron Lavoy Cockrell, rocket scientist and engineer
- Joe F. Edwards, Jr., astronaut
- Flem B. Walker, Jr., U.S. Army Three Star General

== Gallery ==
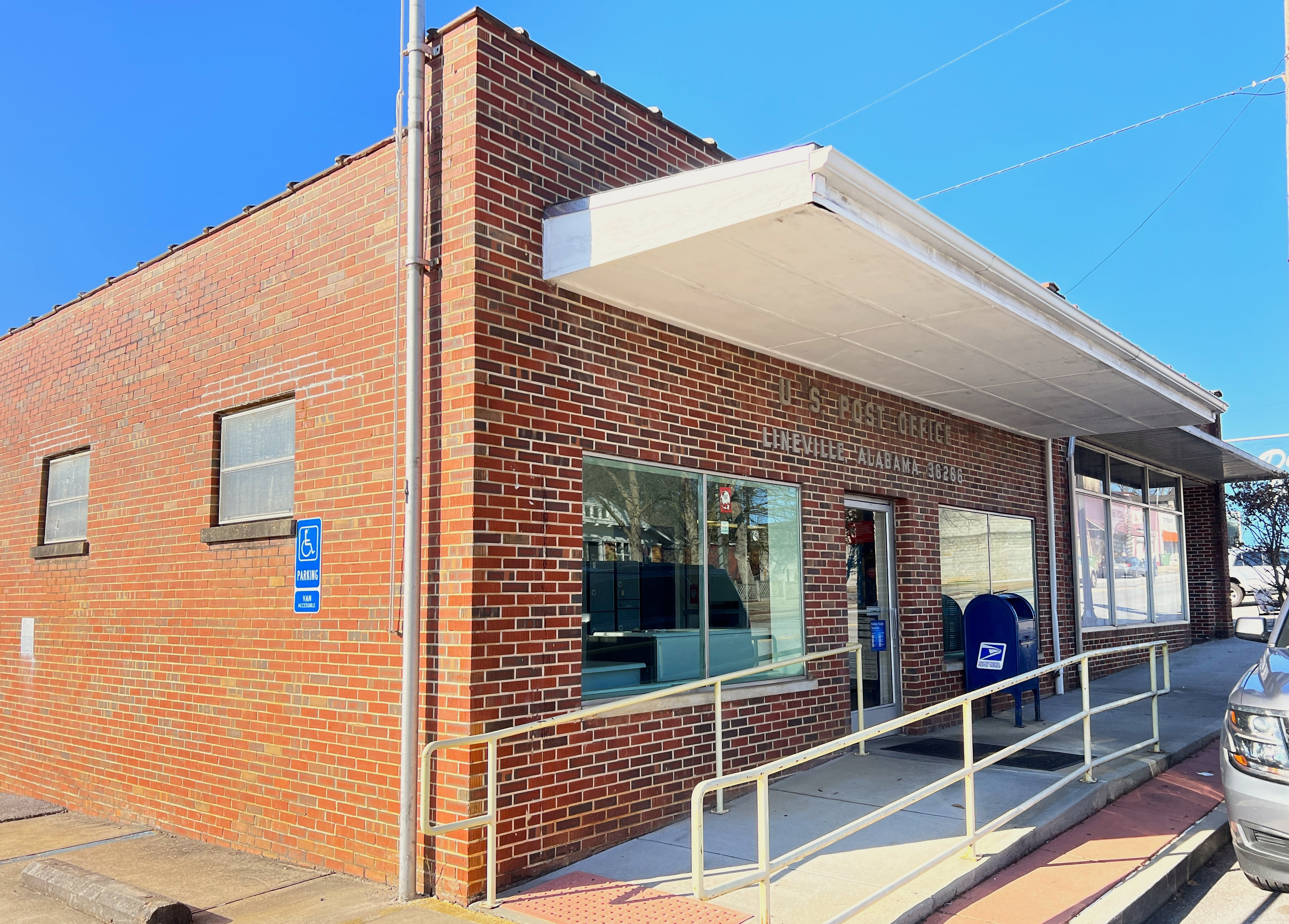
Lineville Post Office (ZIP code: 36266)

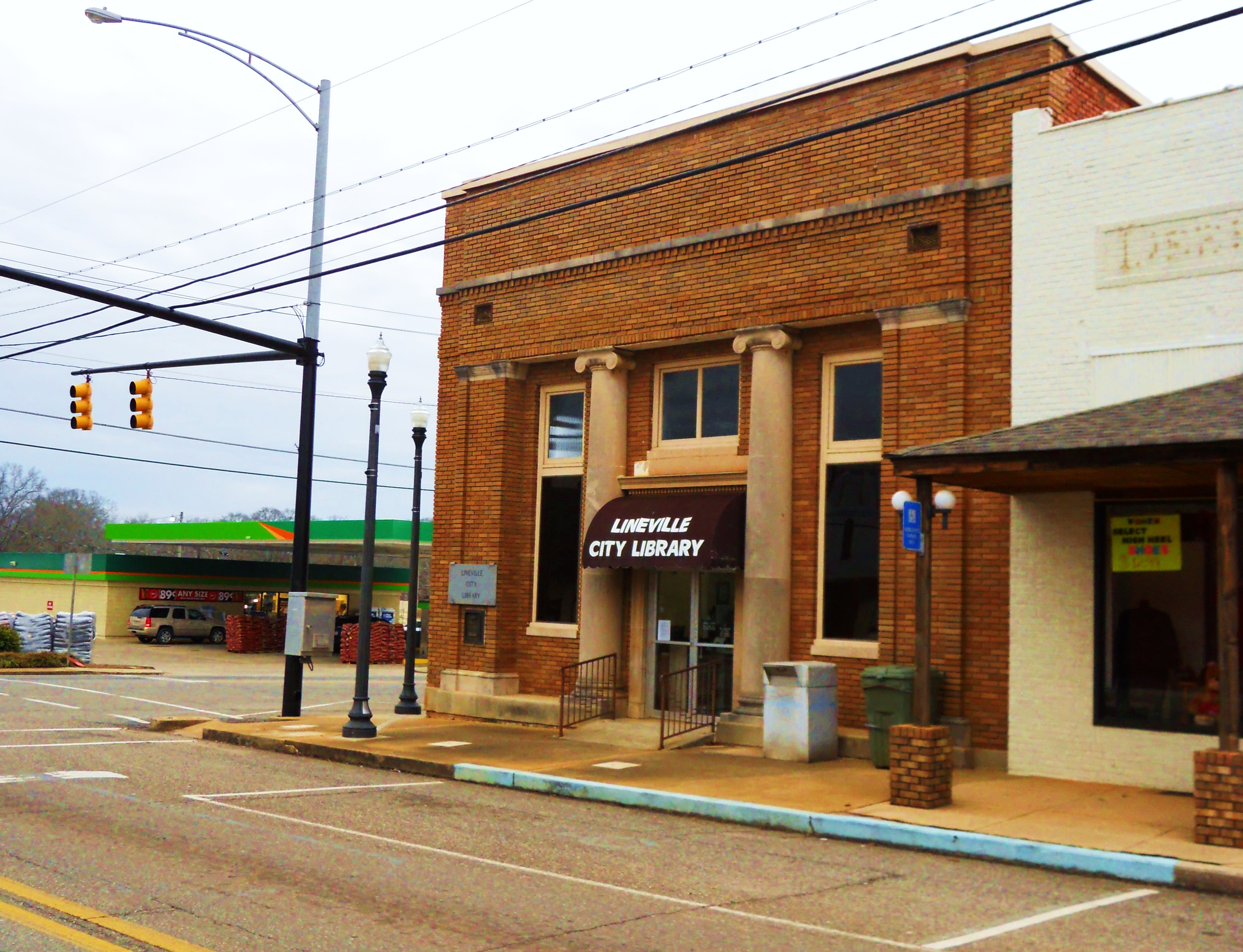
Lineville City Library

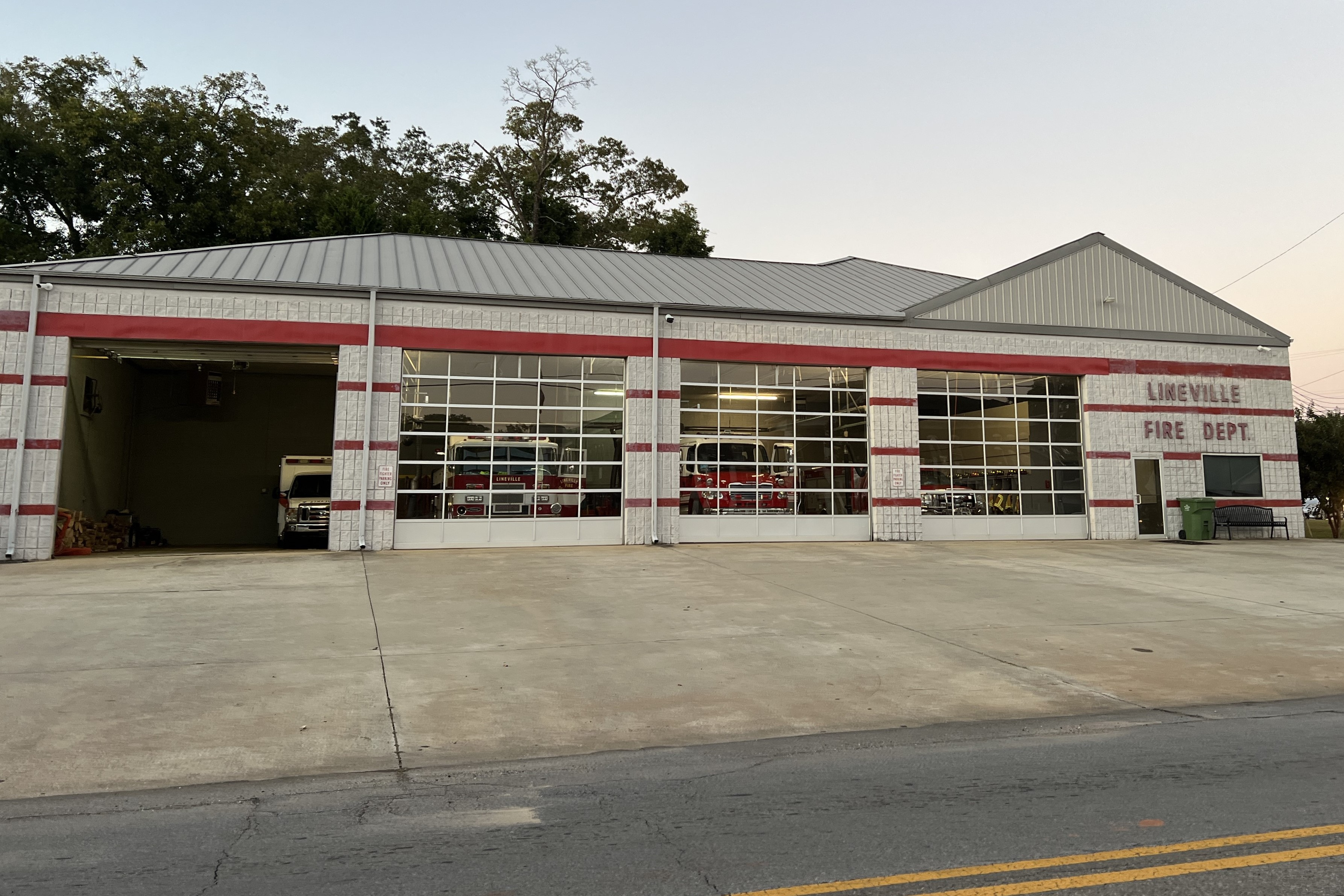
Lineville Fire Department

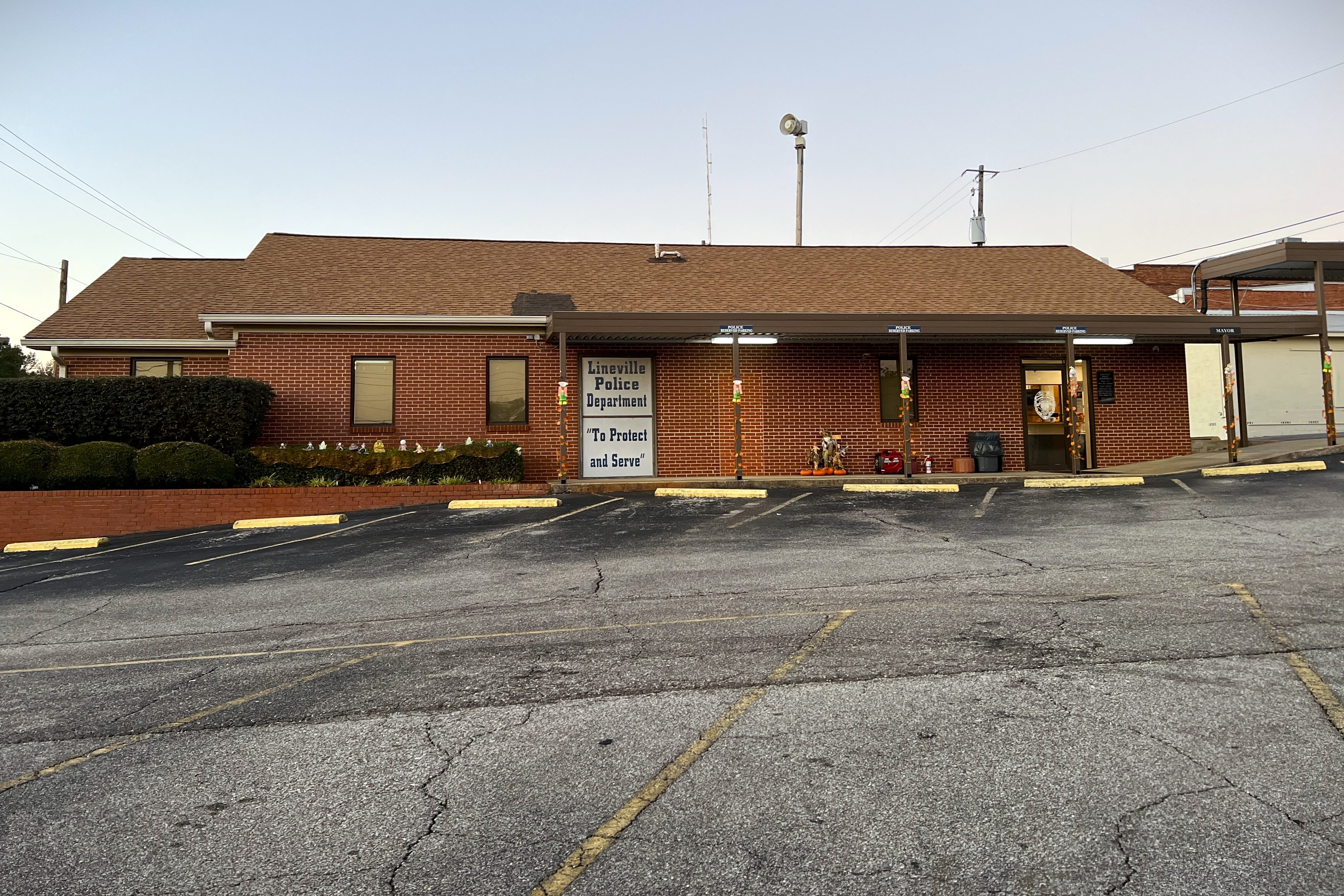
Lineville Police Department

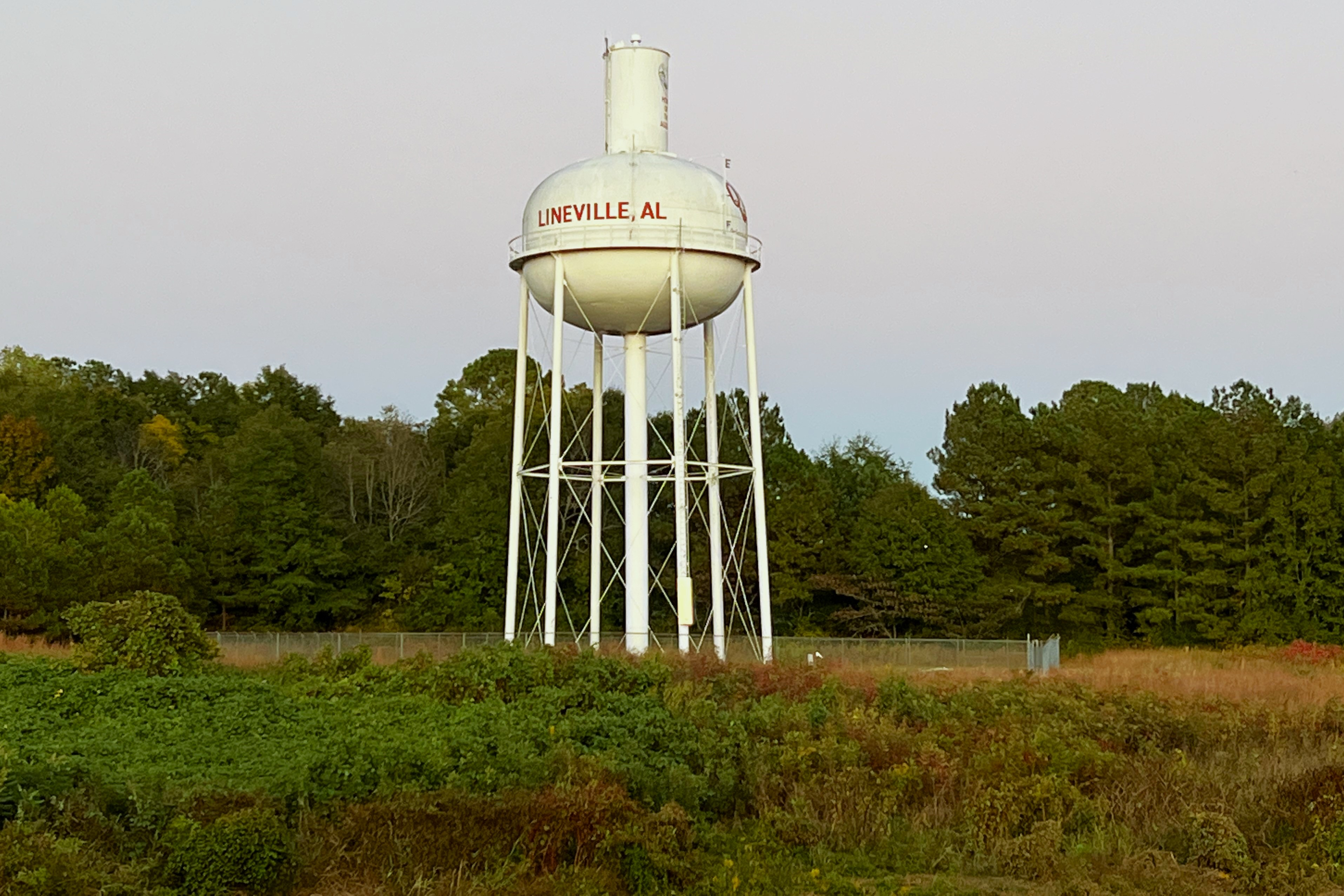
Lineville Water Tower
