= Potash, Alabama =

Unincorporated community in Alabama, United States

- Unincorporated community
- Location within Alabama Location within the United States
- Coordinates: 33°16′38″N 85°21′09″W
- Country: United States
- State: Alabama
- County: Randolph
- Elevation: 1,388 ft (423 m)
- Time zone: UTC-6 (Central (CST))
  - Summer (DST): UTC-5 (CDT)
- Area codes: 256 & 938
- GNIS feature ID: 156924

Potash is an unincorporated community in Randolph County, Alabama, United States.

== History ==
Potash is likely named for the potassium salts found and mined in the surrounding area.

A post office operated under the name Potash from 1890 to 1897.
