= Cedric, Alabama =

- Unincorporated community
- Location within Alabama Location within the United States
- Coordinates: 33°06′25″N 85°17′12″W
- Country: United States
- State: Alabama
- County: Chambers
- Elevation: 768 ft (234 m)
- Time zone: UTC-6 (Central (CST))
  - Summer (DST): UTC-5 (CDT)
- GNIS feature ID: 164181

Cedric is a ghost town in northeastern Chambers County, Alabama. Today it is entirely in private ownership. It is located 3–4 miles to the southeast of present-day Roanoke, and about 1 mile southwest of Bacon Level Church. Joseph Rushton (and his wife Martha Lorance) an early Alabama potter, lived near Cedric.

== Pottery industry ==
While nearby Bacon Level had several well known potters, Cedric's Joseph Rushton was part of their community as well.
