= Ava, Alabama =

Unincorporated community in Alabama, United States

- Unincorporated community
- Location within Alabama Location within the United States
- Coordinates: 33°20′35″N 85°28′41″W
- Country: United States
- State: Alabama
- County: Randolph
- Elevation: 961 ft (293 m)
- Time zone: UTC-6 (Central (CST))
  - Summer (DST): UTC-5 (CDT)
- Area code: 256
- GNIS feature ID: 113301

Ava is an unincorporated community in Randolph County, Alabama, United States.

== Demographics ==
According to the returns from 1850-2010 for Alabama, Ava has never reported a population figure separately on the U.S. Census.
