= Almond, Alabama =

Unincorporated community in Alabama, United States

Almond
- Unincorporated community
- Location in Alabama.
- Coordinates: 33°08′47″N 85°37′18″W
- Country: United States
- State: Alabama
- County: Randolph
- Elevation: 843 ft (257 m)
- Time zone: UTC-6 (Central (CST))
  - Summer (DST): UTC-5 (CDT)
- Area code: 334

Almond, also known as Flat Rock, is an unincorporated community in Randolph County, Alabama, United States.

== History ==
The community was most likely named for its first postmaster, Almond P. Hunter. A post office called Almond was established in 1852, and remained in operation until it was discontinued in 1913.

== Demographics ==
=== Flat Rock/Almond Precinct (1870-1950) ===
Historical population
Census	Pop.	Note	%±
1870	901		—
1880	946		5.0%
1890	985		4.1%
1900	1,157		17.5%
1910	1,841		59.1%
1920	1,633		−11.3%
1930	1,467		−10.2%
1940	1,272		−13.3%
1950	1,024		−19.5%
U.S. Decennial Census

Almond has never reported separately as an unincorporated community on the U.S. Census. However, the 8th beat/precinct of Randolph County, was named "Flat Rock" (the earlier name for Almond) from 1870-1910 and as Almond from 1920-1950. In 1960, the precinct was merged as part of a larger reorganization of counties into the census division of Wadley.
