= Byron Lavoy Cockrell =

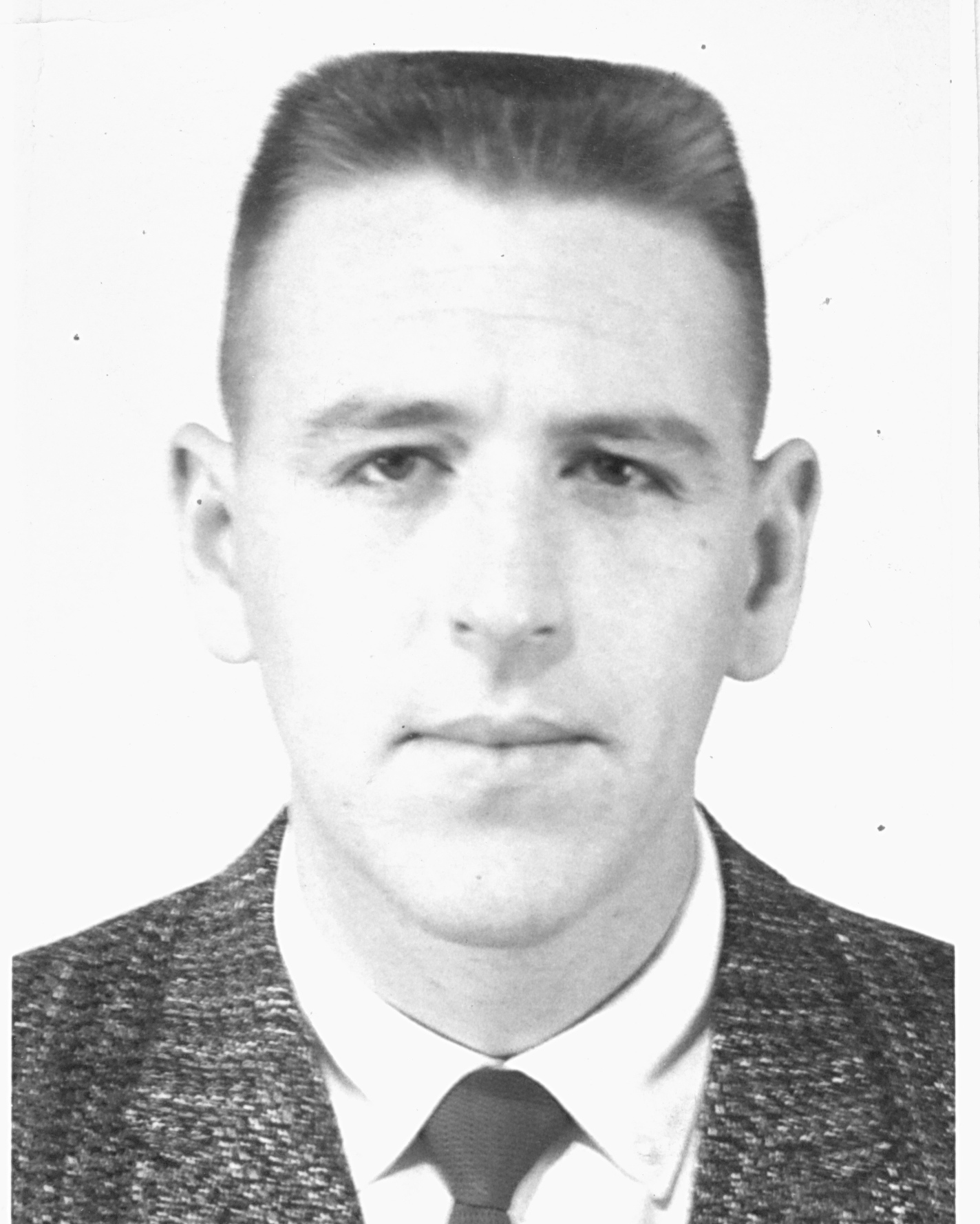
Byron Cockrell while attending Auburn University.

Byron Lavoy Cockrell (1935–2007) was an American rocket scientist and engineer who conducted research and development of micro-motors for solid propellant rockets and was later involved in the Minuteman ICBM program.

== Early life ==
Byron Cockrell was born on July 3, 1935, to Webster and Willa Cockrell of Lineville, Alabama. He was one of four children and grew up in Clay County, Alabama. He attended Clay County High School and later earned a degree in Aeronautical Engineering from Auburn University.

In 1957, he married Hazel Goodman of Lineville, Alabama. They eventually had four children, daughters, Julie and Gwendolyn, and sons, Jeffrey and Bruce.

== Career ==
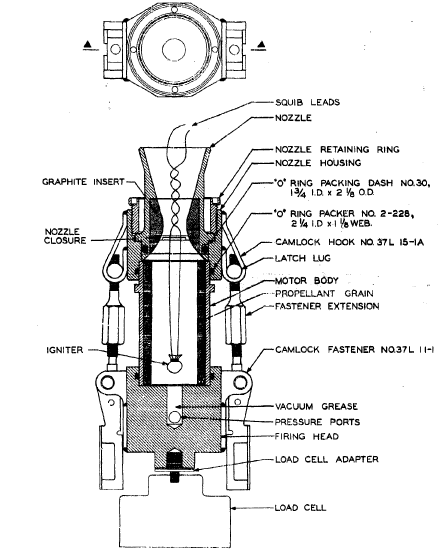
Redesigned Clamp-Type 2C1.5-4 Rocket Motor used for remote testing

Cockrell's career took his family across the United States, including Alabama, Utah, Texas, and Virginia.

=== Redstone Arsenal, Alabama ===
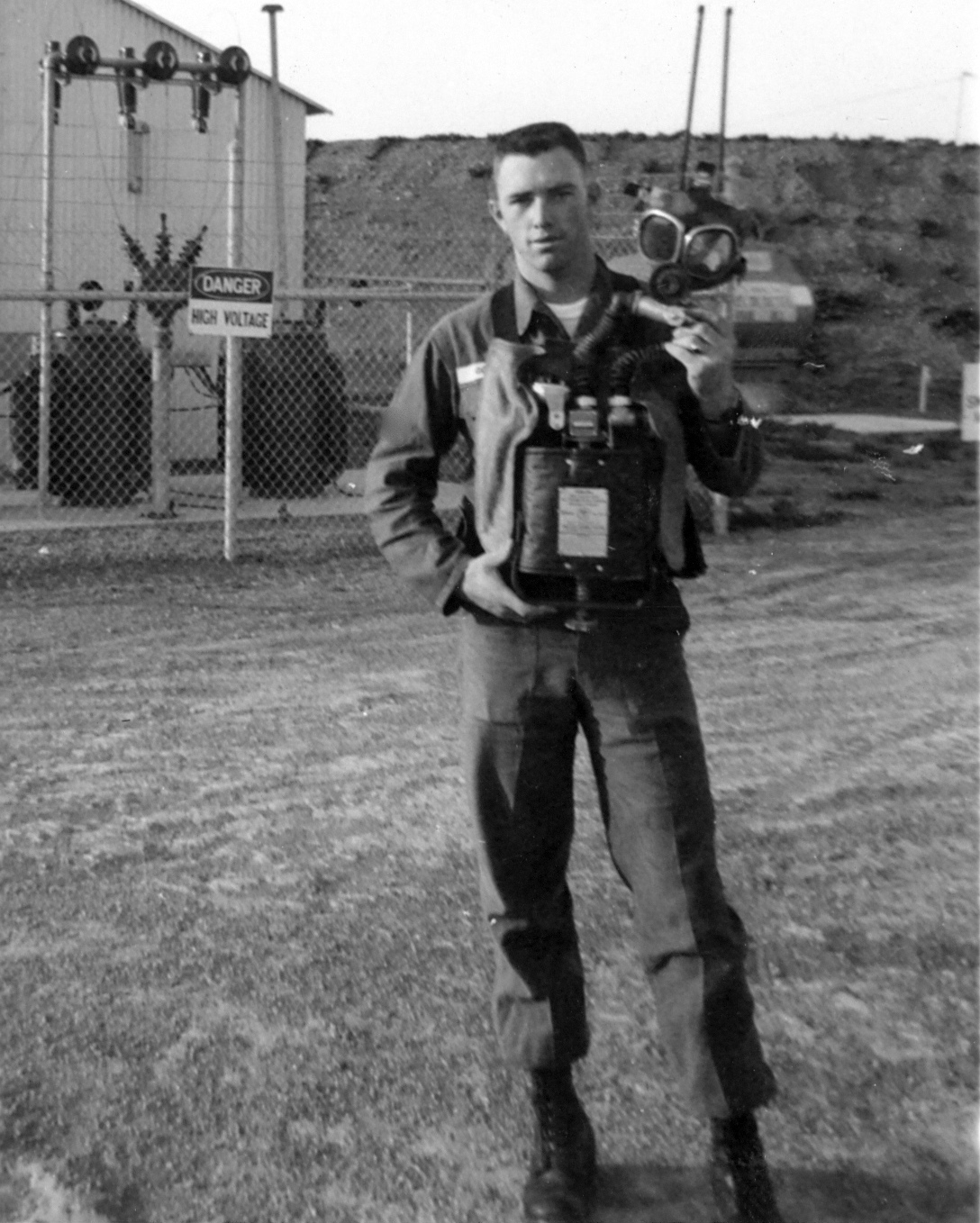
Breathing apparatus (October 1959). Great measures were taken to mitigate danger however, all employees and soldiers had to be prepared for the worse when working with rockets.

In April 1949, the Rohm and Haas Company signed a contract with the U.S. Army Missile Command near Redstone Arsenal to do research and development work on rockets and jet propulsion. After graduating from Auburn University, Cockrell began his career in Redstone Arsenal's Research Division. Cockrell and other staff often served as consultants to the Army Laboratories and other companies. They contributed to many programs including Polaris, Poseidon, Pershing, and Minuteman.

Cockrell focused on reducing motor sizes to accommodate the trend in propellant research. Several factors drove this trend to include:

- Many researchers had an upper restriction on propellant quantity
- Increasing toxicity and/or sensitivity of new formulations
- Limited availability or cost of novel propellant ingredients

Before the new, smaller motors could even be built, Cockrell and team had to completely redesign the motor hardware to allow them to be remotely fired. These innovative, new motor designs also had to consider the stress on the hardware especially since it was going be evaluating very hazardous materials. Due to the hazardous nature of the propellants, Cockrell had to design casting equipment and facilities that could be operated remotely. These included two facilities to handle up 250 grams and one to handle up to 2 pounds of propellant; both of which had closed-circuit television cameras to provide close-up views of the equipment and controls.

Cockrell's research also showed that rocket efficiency could be scaled when corrections were made for heat-loss and two-phase-flow effects. These scaling factors could be used to accurately predict the specific impulse of the propellant in any other untested motor configuration. The specific impulse is the most important metric for the efficiency of a rocket engine. This metric is defined as impulse per unit of propellant and is either measured as a speed ($V_{e}$ in meters/second or ft/s) or as a time (seconds).

=== Vought Systems Division, Dallas, Texas ===
In 1972, Vought Aeronautics and Vought Missiles and Space were combined into Vought Systems. While working for Vought Systems in Texas, Cockrell conducted design and analysis to define a detailed configuration capable of meeting the stringent performance, structural, and mass properties requirements set forth in their new government contract. Cockrell and team delivered 25 successful heavywall motor tests, and 31 successful flight motor tests. The work culminated in the fabrication of a complete prototype.

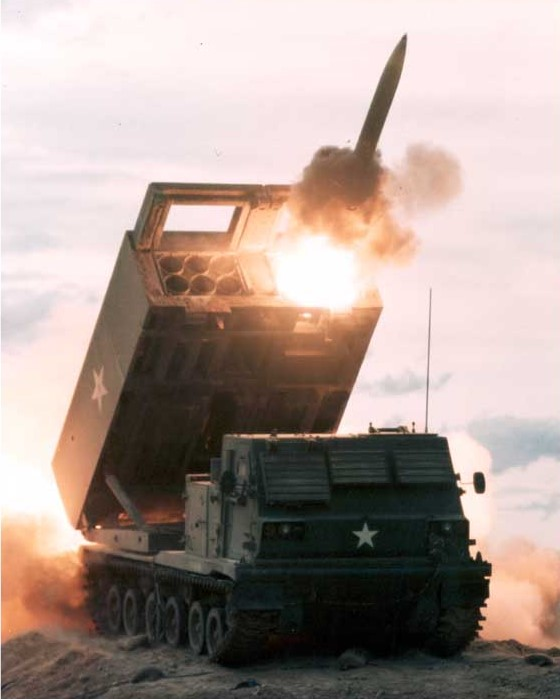
The M270 MLRS conducts a rocket launch.

Cockrell's expertise also served Vought Systems when they became the prime contractor for the development of the Scout launch vehicle which were to place small satellites into orbit around the Earth. Scout, an acronym for Solid Controlled Orbital Utility Test system, was a four-stage solid fuel satellite system capable of launching a 385-pound satellite into a 500-mile orbit. Since 1976, its launch success rate was 100 percent and included 23 satellites launched for the international space organizations.

Much of his work in Texas remains classified. However, because of his expertise and time frame; Cockrell was more than likely involved in the Army's Multiple Launch Rocket System (MLRS) program. Vought was awarded a contract to conduct design and trade-off analysis and system optimization of the MLRS in 1976. One year later, the MLRS design was complete and production began in 1980.

=== Atlantic Research Corporation, Virginia ===
While working for Atlantic Research Corporation (now Aerojet) in Virginia, Cockrell served as a program director. His leadership, experience, and expertise served several programs well to include the Minuteman program. During this time, he was recognized as an Associate Fellow by the American Institute of Aeronautics and Astronautics (AIAA). According to Article III 3.2, of the AIAA's Constitution:

Associate Fellows shall be persons who have accomplished or been in charge of important engineering or scientific work, or who have done work of outstanding merit or have otherwise made outstanding contributions to the arts, sciences, or technology of aeronautics or astronautics.

== Personal life ==
After retirement, he remained in Virginia where he spent time with his children, three grandsons and six granddaughters. In 2006, his wife Hazel died and a year later his mother Willa (93) died after being married to his father for 65 years.
