= Alabama State Route 48 =

State highway in Alabama, United States

State Route 48

Route information
- Maintained by ALDOT
- Length: 34.321 mi (55.234 km)
- Existed: 1940–present

Major junctions
- West end: SR 9 at Lineville
- US 431 at Wedowee
- East end: SR 5 at the Georgia state line near Graham

Location
- Country: United States
- State: Alabama
- Counties: Clay, Randolph

Highway system
- Alabama State Highway System; Interstate; US; State
← SR 47	→ SR 49

State Route 48 (SR 48) is a 34.321-mile-long (55.234 km) state highway in the eastern part of the U.S. state of Alabama. The western terminus of the highway is at its intersection with SR 9 at Lineville. The highway continues eastward to the Georgia state line, where it continues as Georgia State Route 5 (SR 5).

== Route description ==
SR 48 is routed along two-lane roadways for its entire length. It serves as a feeder route to connect Lineville with U.S. Route 431 (US 431), a major north–south highway in the eastern part of the state. East of the Clay–Randolph county line, the highway crosses over Lake Wedowee. The orientation of the route is generally eastward as it travels from Lineville to Wedowee. At Wedowee, SR 48 intersects US 431 and turns to the northeast, continuing this trajectory as it leads to the Georgia state line.

== History ==
The original routing of SR 48 is quite different from the route that it has today. When the route was formed in 1940, it traveled from Pell City to the Georgia state line east, rather than northeast, of Wedowee. That route has now been replaced by SR 34 from Pell City to Talladega, SR 77 from Talladega to Ashland, and SR 9 from Ashland to Lineville. The old section of SR 48 east of Wedowee is now designated as Randolph County Route 56.

== Major intersections ==
County	Location	mi	km	Destinations	Notes
Clay	Lineville	0.000	0.000	SR 9 (East Main Street)	Western terminus
Randolph	Wedowee	15.549	25.024	US 431 south (South Main Street / SR 1) – Roanoke, Opelika	West end of US 431/SR 1 concurrency
Randolph	Wedowee	15.672	25.222	US 431 north (North Main Street / SR 1) – Oxford	East end of US 431/SR 1 concurrency
Randolph		34.321	55.234	SR 5 north – Bowdon	Georgia state line
1.000 mi = 1.609 km; 1.000 km = 0.621 mi: Concurrency terminus
