= Dingler, Alabama =

Unincorporated community in Alabama, United States

- Unincorporated community
- Location within Alabama Location within the United States
- Coordinates: 33°19′52″N 85°37′51″W
- Country: United States
- State: Alabama
- County: Randolph
- Elevation: 945 ft (288 m)
- Time zone: UTC-6 (Central (CST))
  - Summer (DST): UTC-5 (CDT)
- Area codes: 256 & 938
- GNIS feature ID: 156272

Dingler is an unincorporated community in Randolph County, Alabama, United States.

A post office called Dingler was established in 1880, and remained in operation until it was discontinued in 1905.
