= Morrison Crossroads, Alabama =

- Census-designated place
- Location of Morrison Crossroads in Randolph County, Alabama.
- Coordinates: 33°25′12″N 85°29′36″W
- Country: United States
- State: Alabama
- County: Randolph

Area
  - Total: 5.27 sq mi (13.64 km^{2})
  - Land: 5.19 sq mi (13.44 km^{2})
  - Water: 0.073 sq mi (0.19 km^{2})
- Elevation: 1,014 ft (309 m)

Population (2020)
  - Total: 221
  - Density: 42.6/sq mi (16.44/km^{2})
- Time zone: UTC-6 (Central (CST))
  - Summer (DST): UTC-5 (CDT)
- Area codes: 256 & 938
- GNIS feature ID: 2582688

Morrison Crossroads (also known as Morrison Crossroad) is a census-designated place and unincorporated community in Randolph County, Alabama, United States. As of the 2020 census, Morrison Crossroads had a population of 221.

== Demographics ==
Historical population
Census	Pop.	Note	%±
2010	219		—
2020	221		0.9%
U.S. Decennial Census

Morrison Crossroads was first listed as a census designated place in the 2010 U.S. census.

Morrison Crossroads CDP, Alabama – Racial and ethnic composition Note: the US Census treats Hispanic/Latino as an ethnic category. This table excludes Latinos from the racial categories and assigns them to a separate category. Hispanics/Latinos may be of any race.
Race / Ethnicity (NH = Non-Hispanic)	Pop 2010	Pop 2020	% 2010	% 2020
White alone (NH)	200	199	91.32%	90.05%
Black or African American alone (NH)	5	4	2.28%	1.81%
Native American or Alaska Native alone (NH)	0	0	0.00%	0.00%
Asian alone (NH)	1	0	0.46%	0.00%
Native Hawaiian or Pacific Islander alone (NH)	0	0	0.00%	0.00%
Other race alone (NH)	1	0	0.46%	0.00%
Mixed race or Multiracial (NH)	0	3	0.00%	1.36%
Hispanic or Latino (any race)	12	15	5.48%	6.79%
Total	219	221	100.00%	100.00%
