= Graham, Alabama =

- Census-designated place
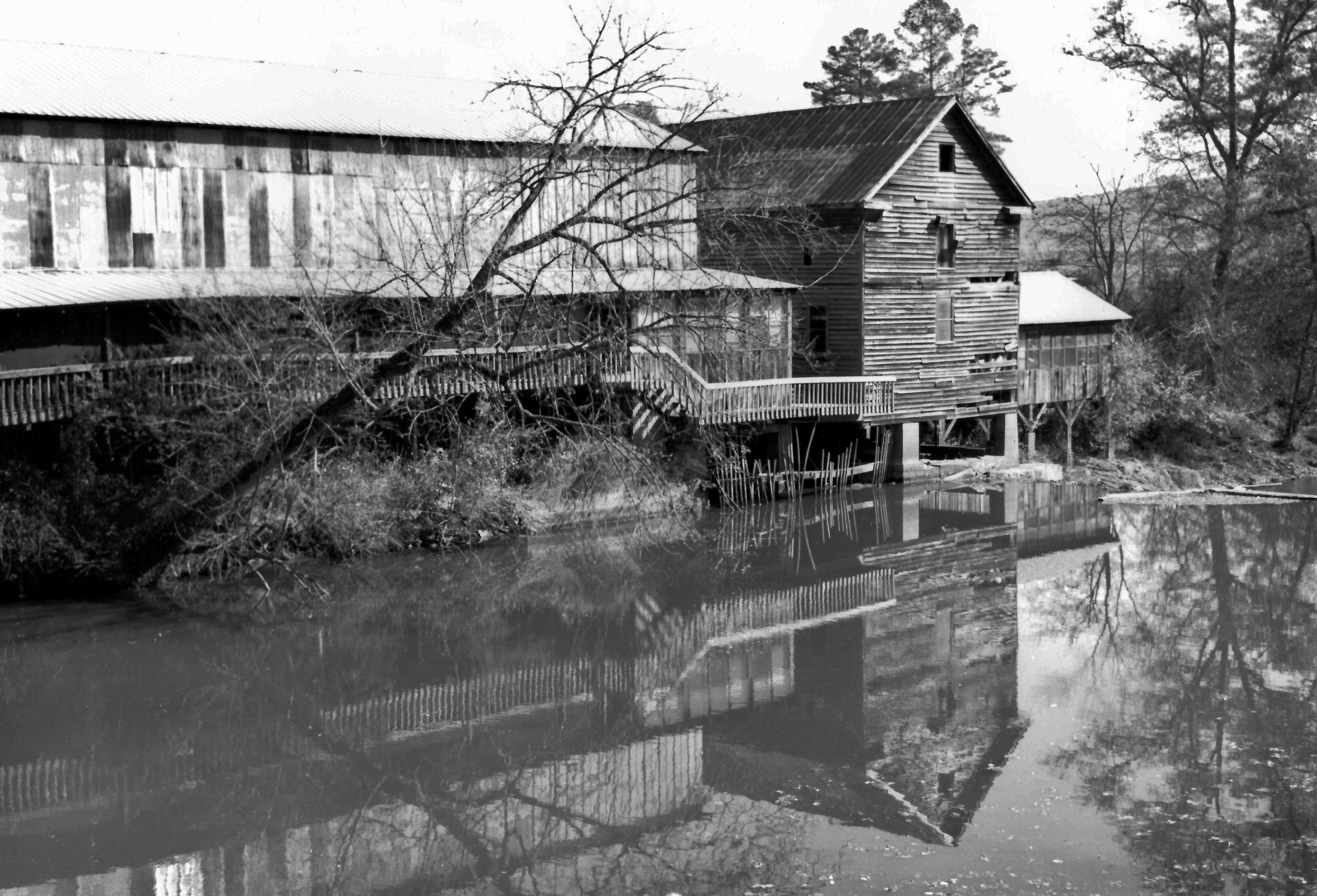
- Graham's most recognizable landmark was Butler's Mill, a cotton gin located on the Little Tallapoosa River. The mill was built in 1912 and burned down on October 17, 2016.

- Location of Graham in Randolph County, Alabama.
- Coordinates: 33°27′19″N 85°19′23″W
- Country: United States
- State: Alabama
- County: Randolph

Area
  - Total: 5.85 sq mi (15.16 km^{2})
  - Land: 5.85 sq mi (15.16 km^{2})
  - Water: 0 sq mi (0.00 km^{2})
- Elevation: 1,037 ft (316 m)

Population (2020)
  - Total: 196
  - Density: 33.5/sq mi (12.93/km^{2})
- Time zone: UTC-6 (Central (CST))
  - Summer (DST): UTC-5 (CDT)
- Area codes: 256 & 938
- GNIS feature ID: 2582677

Graham is a census-designated place and unincorporated community in Randolph County, Alabama, United States. As of the 2020 census, Graham had a population of 196.

== Demographics ==
Historical population
Census	Pop.	Note	%±
2010	211		—
2020	196		−7.1%
U.S. Decennial Census

Graham was first listed as a census designated place in the 2010 U.S. census.

Graham CDP, Alabama – Racial and ethnic composition Note: the US Census treats Hispanic/Latino as an ethnic category. This table excludes Latinos from the racial categories and assigns them to a separate category. Hispanics/Latinos may be of any race.
Race / Ethnicity (NH = Non-Hispanic)	Pop 2010	Pop 2020	% 2010	% 2020
White alone (NH)	177	160	83.89%	81.63%
Black or African American alone (NH)	34	21	16.11%	10.71%
Native American or Alaska Native alone (NH)	0	0	0.00%	0.00%
Asian alone (NH)	0	0	0.00%	0.00%
Native Hawaiian or Pacific Islander alone (NH)	0	0	0.00%	0.00%
Other race alone (NH)	0	0	0.00%	0.00%
Mixed race or Multiracial (NH)	0	11	0.00%	5.61%
Hispanic or Latino (any race)	0	4	0.00%	2.04%
Total	211	196	100.00%	100.00%
