= Hobson, Randolph County, Alabama =

Unincorporated community in Alabama, United States

Hobson, Alabama
- Unincorporated community
- Location within Alabama Location within the United States
- Coordinates: 33°16′50″N 85°24′27″W
- Country: United States
- State: Alabama
- County: Randolph
- Elevation: 1,099 ft (335 m)
- Time zone: UTC-6 (Central (CST))
  - Summer (DST): UTC-5 (CDT)
- Area codes: 256 & 938
- GNIS feature ID: 140225

Hobson is an unincorporated community in Randolph County, Alabama, United States, located 4.9 miles (7.9 km) east-southeast of Wedowee.
