= Swagg, Alabama =

Unincorporated community in Alabama, United States

- Unincorporated community
- Location within the state of Alabama
- Coordinates: 33°22′28″N 85°32′52″W
- Country: United States
- State: Alabama
- County: Randolph
- Elevation: 1,102 ft (336 m)
- Time zone: UTC-6 (Central (CST))
  - Summer (DST): UTC-5 (CDT)
- GNIS feature ID: 157132

Swagg (also Swag) is an unincorporated community in Randolph County, Alabama, United States.

A post office was once located there.

The Bethel West Church and Cemetery is located in Swagg.
