= Little Tallapoosa River =

Coordinates: 33°22′13.02″N 85°29′55.61″W

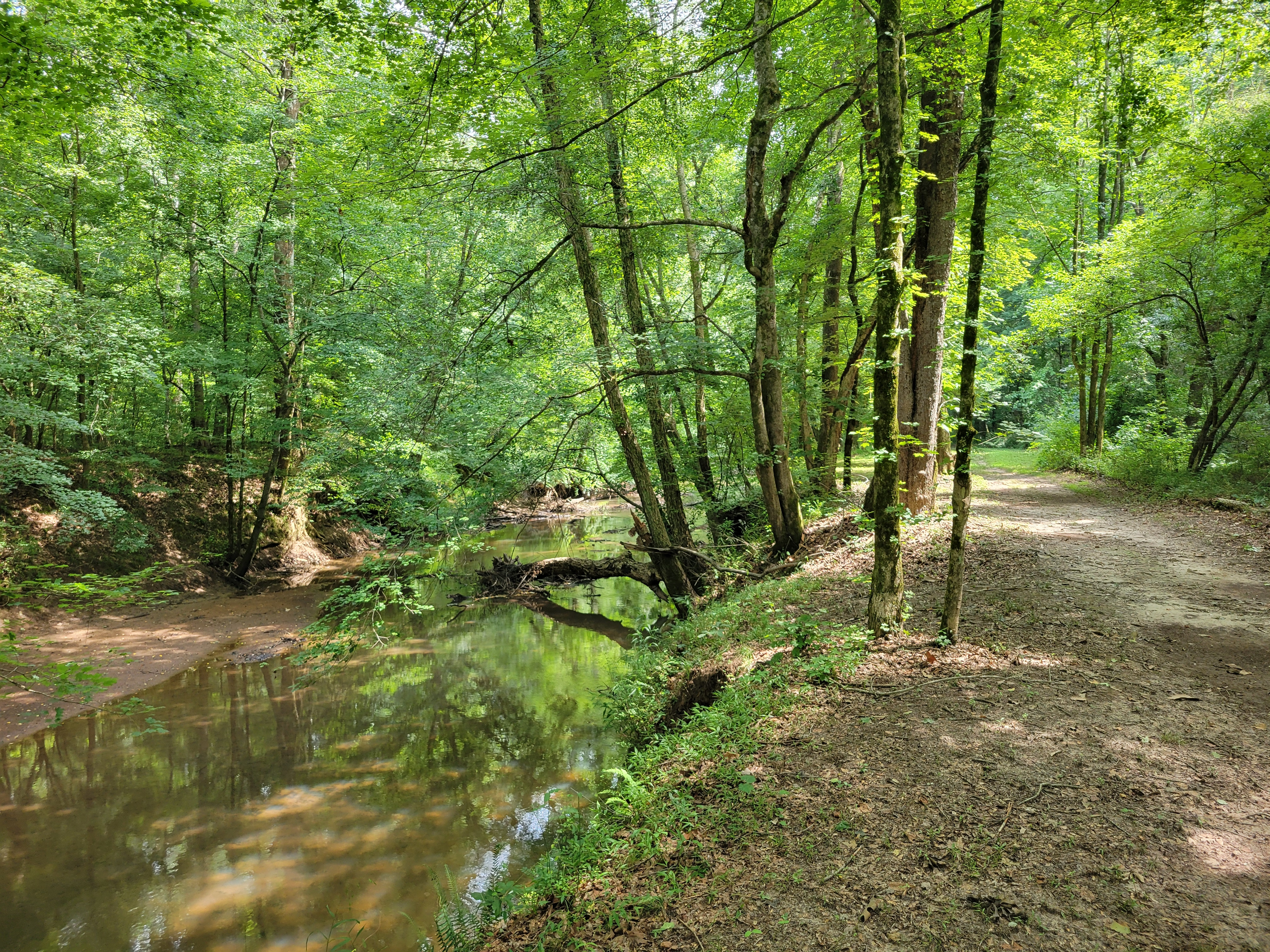
- Little Tallapoosa River in Carroll County, Georgia

Location
- Country: United States

Physical characteristics
- Source
  - location: North Carroll County, Georgia
- Mouth
  - location: Tallapoosa River
- Length: 97 mi (156 km)

Little Tallapoosa River is a 97-mile-long (156 km) river in Georgia and Alabama, in the United States. It rises in northern Carroll County, Georgia near the city of Villa Rica and flows southwest into Alabama, joining the Tallapoosa River in Randolph County near the head of R.L. Harris Reservoir.

In May 2012, Aimee Copeland, a 24-year-old graduate student fell from a zip-line into the Little Tallapoosa River. She suffered a deep cut in her leg and contracted necrotizing fasciitis, a flesh-eating bacterial disease. She was forced to have her leg amputated a week after the accident.
