= Randolph County, Alabama =

County in Alabama, United States

- County
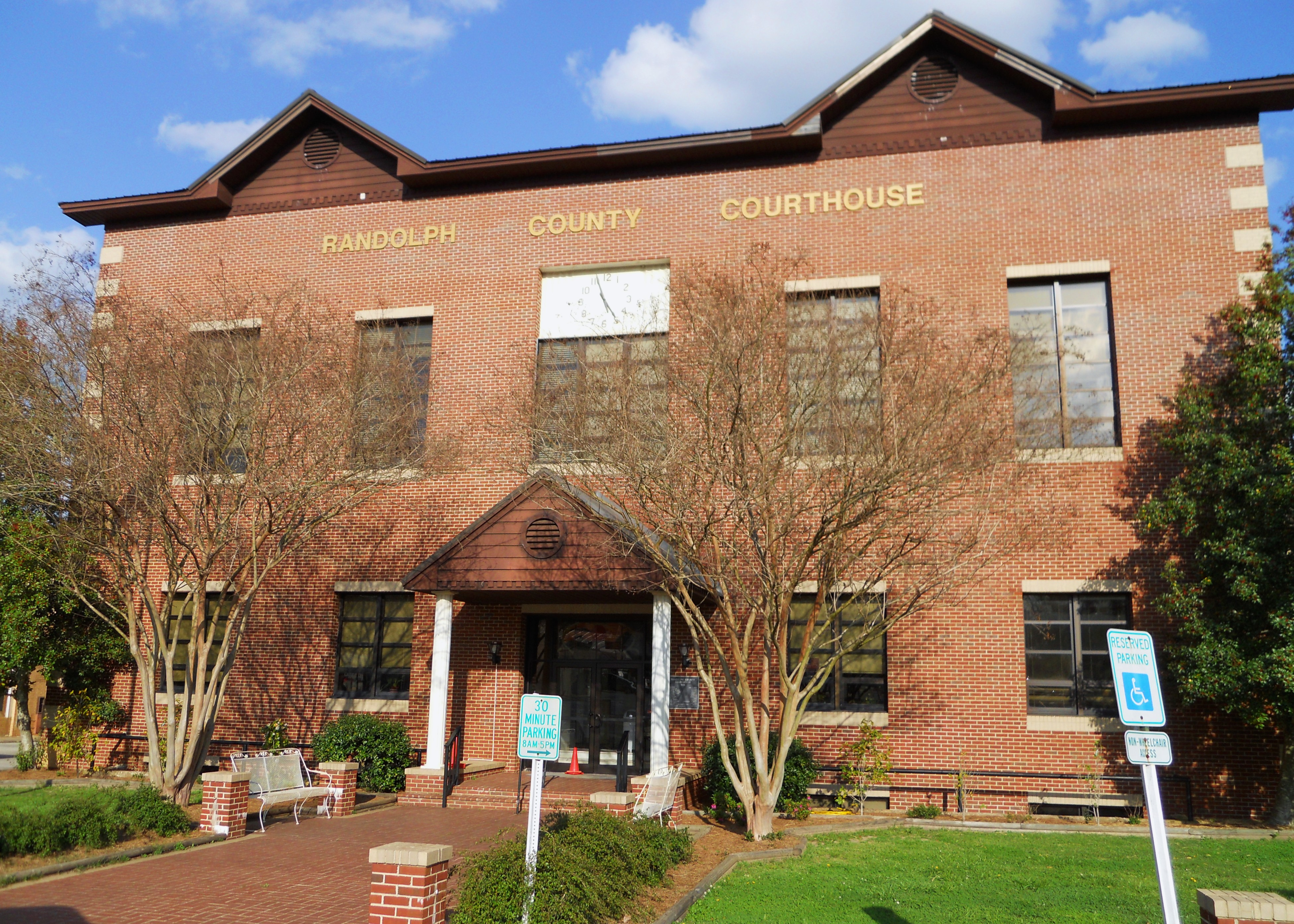
- Randolph County Courthouse in Wedowee

- Seal

- Location within the U.S. state of Alabama
- Coordinates: 33°17′21″N 85°27′37″W
- Country: United States
- State: Alabama
- Founded: December 18, 1832
- Named for: John Randolph of Roanoke
- Seat: Wedowee
- Largest city: Roanoke

Area
  - Total: 584 sq mi (1,510 km^{2})
  - Land: 581 sq mi (1,500 km^{2})
  - Water: 3.6 sq mi (9.3 km^{2}) 0.56%

Population (2020)
  - Total: 21,967
  - Estimate (2025): 23,163 ▲
  - Density: 37.8/sq mi (14.6/km^{2})
- Time zone: UTC−6 (Central)
  - Summer (DST): UTC−5 (CDT)
- Congressional district: 3rd
- Website: randolphcountyal.gov
- County Number 56 on Alabama License Plates

Randolph County is a county on the central eastern border of the U.S. state of Alabama. As of the 2020 census, the population was 21,967. Its county seat is Wedowee. Its name is in honor of John Randolph, a member of the United States Senate from Virginia. Randolph County was a prohibition or dry county until 2012, when the citizens of Randolph County voted to repeal prohibition.

== History ==
Randolph County was established by the Alabama Legislature on December 18, 1832, following Indian Removal of the Creek people. It was named in honor of John Randolph, a well-known Virginia congressman. Randolph County was one of several counties created out of the last Creek cession formulated by the Treaty of Cusseta, on March 24, 1832. It lies within the Piedmont region, which extends from Alabama to Pennsylvania.

The first white settlers said the county had an abundance of the "purest and coldest freestone water in the world." The area was also noted for its gentle rolling hills. The first county seat for Randolph County was established in 1833 at Hedgeman Triplett's Ferry on the west bank of the Big Tallapoosa River, about 10 miles (16 km) west of Wedowee, Alabama.

In 1835 (2 years later), the county seat was moved by the commissioners to nearby Wedowee. This city lies in the center of Randolph County, on a fork of the Little Tallapoosa River. Wedowee was named after a Creek tribal chief "Wah-wah-nee" (or "Wah-dow-wee") of a village here. The European-American town was developed near that site after the Creek were forced out.

The county was developed for agriculture, specifically cotton plantations, which were worked by African-American slaves brought by migrants to the region or transported from the Upper South during the domestic slave trade. It was adjacent to what became known as the Black Belt of Alabama, an area of plantation development in the uplands, where short-staple cotton was cultivated. Many African Americans stayed in the area as sharecroppers and tenant farmers after the Civil War, but left for other opportunities during the first half of the 20th century. The table below shows population declines from 1920 to 1970, reflecting this demographic change. In 2010 some 20 percent of the population was African American, reflecting this history of cotton agriculture.

== Geography ==
According to the United States Census Bureau, the county has a total area of 584 square miles (1,510 km^{2}), of which 581 square miles (1,500 km^{2}) is land and 3.6 square miles (9.3 km^{2}) (0.6%) is water.

=== Adjacent counties ===
- Cleburne County - north
- Carroll County, Georgia - northeast
- Heard County, Georgia - east
- Troup County, Georgia - southeast
- Chambers County - south
- Tallapoosa County - southwest
- Clay County - west

== Demographics ==
Historical population
Census	Pop.	Note	%±
1840	4,973		—
1850	11,581		132.9%
1860	20,059		73.2%
1870	12,006		−40.1%
1880	16,575		38.1%
1890	17,219		3.9%
1900	21,647		25.7%
1910	24,659		13.9%
1920	27,064		9.8%
1930	26,861		−0.8%
1940	25,516		−5.0%
1950	22,513		−11.8%
1960	19,477		−13.5%
1970	18,331		−5.9%
1980	20,075		9.5%
1990	19,881		−1.0%
2000	22,380		12.6%
2010	22,913		2.4%
2020	21,967		−4.1%
2025 (est.)	23,163	▲	5.4%
U.S. Decennial Census; 1790–1960 1900–1990; 1990–2000 2010–2020

=== 2020 census ===
As of the 2020 census, the county had a population of 21,967. The median age was 44.4 years. 21.4% of residents were under the age of 18 and 20.8% of residents were 65 years of age or older. For every 100 females there were 93.9 males, and for every 100 females age 18 and over there were 91.2 males age 18 and over.

The racial makeup of the county was 76.4% White, 17.4% Black or African American, 0.3% American Indian and Alaska Native, 0.4% Asian, 0.0% Native Hawaiian and Pacific Islander, 1.7% from some other race, and 3.8% from two or more races. Hispanic or Latino residents of any race comprised 2.8% of the population.

0.0% of residents lived in urban areas, while 100.0% lived in rural areas.

There were 8,931 households in the county, of which 28.7% had children under the age of 18 living with them and 29.0% had a female householder with no spouse or partner present. About 28.9% of all households were made up of individuals and 14.0% had someone living alone who was 65 years of age or older.

There were 12,400 housing units, of which 28.0% were vacant. Among occupied housing units, 75.0% were owner-occupied and 25.0% were renter-occupied. The homeowner vacancy rate was 1.8% and the rental vacancy rate was 20.5%.

=== Racial and ethnic composition ===
Randolph County, Alabama – Racial and ethnic composition Note: the US Census treats Hispanic/Latino as an ethnic category. This table excludes Latinos from the racial categories and assigns them to a separate category. Hispanics/Latinos may be of any race.
Race / Ethnicity (NH = Non-Hispanic)	Pop 2000	Pop 2010	Pop 2020	% 2000	% 2010	% 2020
White alone (NH)	16,940	17,280	16,629	75.69%	75.42%	75.70%
Black or African American alone (NH)	4,949	4,604	3,814	22.11%	20.09%	17.36%
Native American or Alaska Native alone (NH)	41	84	50	0.18%	0.37%	0.23%
Asian alone (NH)	50	54	86	0.22%	0.24%	0.39%
Pacific Islander alone (NH)	1	5	1	0.00%	0.02%	0.00%
Other race alone (NH)	9	8	51	0.04%	0.03%	0.23%
Mixed race or Multiracial (NH)	118	229	731	0.53%	1.00%	3.33%
Hispanic or Latino (any race)	272	649	605	1.22%	2.83%	2.75%
Total	22,380	22,913	21,967	100.00%	100.00%	100.00%

=== 2010 census ===
As of the census of 2010, there were 22,913 people, 9,164 households, and 6,357 families living in the county. The population density was 39 people per square mile (15 people/km^{2}). There were 11,982 housing units at an average density of 20.6 units per square mile (8.0 units/km^{2}). The racial makeup of the county was 76.5% White (non-Hispanic), 20.1% Black or African American, 0.4% Native American, 0.2% Asian, 1.6% from other races, and 1.1% from two or more races. 2.8% of the population were Hispanic or Latino of any race.

There were 9,164 households, out of which 27.0% had children under the age of 18 living with them; 51.0% were married couples living together, 13.9% had a female householder with no husband present, and 30.6% were non-families. Nearly 27.9% of all households were made up of individuals, and 12.6% had someone living alone who was 65 years of age or older. The average household size was 2.46, and the average family size was 2.98.

In the county, the population was spread out, with 23.9% under the age of 18, 8.2% from 18 to 24, 22.9% from 25 to 44, 28.0% from 45 to 64, and 17.0% who were 65 years of age or older. The median age was 41.2 years. For every 100 females, there were 94.0 males. For every 100 females age 18 and over, there were 95.8 males.

The median income for a household in the county was $34,593, and the median income for a family was $43,528. Males had a median income of $31,305 versus $27,908 for females. The per capita income for the county was $19,844. About 14.7% of families and 21.5% of the population were below the poverty line, including 28.0% of those under age 18 and 12.8% of those age 65 or over.

=== 2000 census ===
As of the census of 2000, there were 22,380 people, 8,642 households, and 6,222 families living in the county. The population density was 38 people per square mile (15 people/km^{2}). There were 10,285 housing units at an average density of 18 units per square mile (6.9 units/km^{2}). The racial makeup of the county was 76.38% White (non-Hispanic), 22.24% Black or African American, 0.20% Native American, 0.22% Asian, 0.34% from other races, and 0.62% from two or more races. 3.82% of the population were Hispanic or Latino of any race.

There were 8,642 households, out of which 31.10% had children under the age of 18 living with them; 56.20% were married couples living together, 12.20% had a female householder with no husband present, and 28.00% were non-families. Nearly 25.60% of all households were made up of individuals, and 11.50% had someone living alone who was 65 years of age or older. The average household size was 2.52, and the average family size was 3.02.

In the county, the population was spread out, with 25.10% under the age of 18, 8.70% from 18 to 24, 26.80% from 25 to 44, 23.50% from 45 to 64, and 15.90% who were 65 years of age or older. The median age was 38 years. For every 100 females, there were 93.40 males. For every 100 females age 18 and over, there were 90.00 males.

The median income for a household in the county was $28,675, and the median income for a family was $34,684. Males had a median income of $27,069 versus $20,323 for females. The per capita income for the county was $14,147. About 12.60% of families and 17.00% of the population were below the poverty line, including 22.10% of those under age 18 and 14.80% of those age 65 or over.

== Politics ==
Randolph County is a strongly Republican county. The last Democrat to win the county was Jimmy Carter in 1980.

United States presidential election results for Randolph County, Alabama
Year	Republican		Democratic		Third party(ies)	
Year	No.	%	No.	%	No.	%
1904	695	30.48%	1,518	66.58%	67	2.94%
1908	395	32.73%	799	66.20%	13	1.08%
1912	268	14.80%	1,177	64.99%	366	20.21%
1916	652	32.85%	1,324	66.70%	9	0.45%
1920	1,113	44.90%	1,357	54.74%	9	0.36%
1924	669	33.43%	1,307	65.32%	25	1.25%
1928	1,815	59.04%	1,257	40.89%	2	0.07%
1932	767	25.52%	2,226	74.08%	12	0.40%
1936	793	22.19%	2,766	77.39%	15	0.42%
1940	670	21.69%	2,407	77.92%	12	0.39%
1944	702	27.95%	1,785	71.06%	25	1.00%
1948	469	27.11%	0	0.00%	1,261	72.89%
1952	1,047	26.06%	2,964	73.77%	7	0.17%
1956	1,584	33.27%	3,151	66.18%	26	0.55%
1960	1,697	34.60%	3,175	64.73%	33	0.67%
1964	3,127	62.65%	0	0.00%	1,864	37.35%
1968	839	12.33%	666	9.79%	5,299	77.88%
1972	4,427	75.14%	1,330	22.57%	135	2.29%
1976	2,286	37.82%	3,539	58.55%	219	3.62%
1980	3,279	46.22%	3,378	47.62%	437	6.16%
1984	4,940	65.74%	2,439	32.46%	136	1.81%
1988	4,625	64.02%	2,462	34.08%	137	1.90%
1992	3,813	46.77%	3,318	40.70%	1,021	12.52%
1996	3,304	47.41%	3,023	43.38%	642	9.21%
2000	4,666	58.92%	3,094	39.07%	159	2.01%
2004	6,127	68.07%	2,817	31.30%	57	0.63%
2008	7,175	69.10%	3,064	29.51%	145	1.40%
2012	7,224	69.32%	3,078	29.54%	119	1.14%
2016	7,705	75.64%	2,291	22.49%	191	1.87%
2020	8,559	78.98%	2,203	20.33%	75	0.69%
2024	9,102	82.07%	1,920	17.31%	69	0.62%

United States Senate election results for Randolph County, Alabama2
Year	Republican		Democratic		Third party(ies)	
Year	No.	%	No.	%	No.	%
2020	8,400	77.98%	2,362	21.93%	10	0.09%

United States Senate election results for Randolph County, Alabama3
Year	Republican		Democratic		Third party(ies)	
Year	No.	%	No.	%	No.	%
2022	5,471	83.18%	991	15.07%	115	1.75%

Alabama Gubernatorial election results for Randolph County
Year	Republican		Democratic		Third party(ies)	
Year	No.	%	No.	%	No.	%
2022	5,462	82.92%	925	14.04%	200	3.04%

== Transportation ==
=== Major highways ===
- U.S. Highway 431 / State Route 1 (unsigned)
- State Route 22
- State Route 48
- State Route 77

=== Rail ===
- CSX Transportation

== Communities ==
=== City ===
- Roanoke

=== Towns ===
- Wadley
- Wedowee (county seat)
- Woodland

=== Census-designated places ===
- Graham
- Morrison Crossroads
- Rock Mills

=== Unincorporated communities ===
- Almond
- Ava
- Bacon Level
- Corinth (north)
- Corinth (south)
- Dingler
- Folsom
- Hobson
- Liberty Grove
- Louina
- Newell
- Omaha
- Potash
- Swagg

== Places of interest ==
Randolph County is home to Lake Wedowee, a section of the Tallapoosa River.

== See also ==
- Randolph County School District
- National Register of Historic Places listings in Randolph County, Alabama
- Properties on the Alabama Register of Landmarks and Heritage in Randolph County, Alabama
