= Liberty Grove, Alabama =

Unincorporated community in Alabama, United States

- Unincorporated community
- Location within Alabama Location within the United States
- Coordinates: 33°21′12″N 85°25′46″W
- Country: United States
- State: Alabama
- County: Randolph
- Elevation: 997 ft (304 m)
- Time zone: UTC-6 (Central (CST))
  - Summer (DST): UTC-5 (CDT)
- Area codes: 256 & 938
- GNIS feature ID: 140231

Liberty Grove is an unincorporated community in Randolph County, Alabama, United States.
