= Bacon Level, Alabama =

Unincorporated community in Alabama, United States

Bacon Level
- Unincorporated community
- Location in Alabama.
- Coordinates: 33°07′43″N 85°17′27″W
- Country: United States
- State: Alabama
- County: Randolph
- Elevation: 751 ft (229 m)
- Time zone: UTC-6 (Central (CST))
  - Summer (DST): UTC-5 (CDT)
- Area code: 334
- GNIS feature ID: 156011

Bacon Level is an unincorporated community located 3–4 miles (4.8 to 6.4 km) southeast of Roanoke, in Randolph County, Alabama, United States. Nearby churches include Bacon Level Baptist Church.

Bacon Level was named after some pioneers around 1800 had discovered that many items at their camp were stolen, including bacon at their level spot, hence the name.
