= Wedowee, Alabama =

Town in Alabama, US

- Town
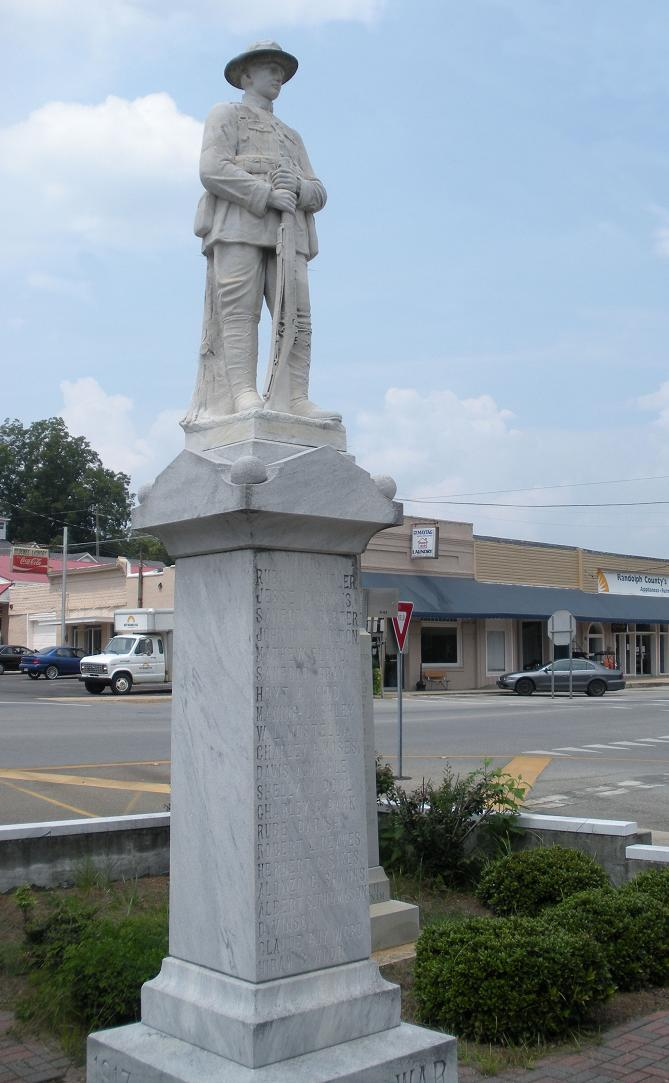
- Rivers Langley statue

- Location of Wedowee in Randolph County, Alabama.
- Coordinates: 33°18′31″N 85°29′47″W
- Country: United States
- State: Alabama
- County: Randolph

Area
  - Total: 3.53 sq mi (9.13 km^{2})
  - Land: 3.49 sq mi (9.05 km^{2})
  - Water: 0.031 sq mi (0.08 km^{2})
- Elevation: 853 ft (260 m)

Population (2020)
  - Total: 737
  - Density: 210.9/sq mi (81.44/km^{2})
- Time zone: UTC-6 (Central (CST))
  - Summer (DST): UTC-5 (CDT)
- ZIP code: 36278
- Area code: 256
- FIPS code: 01-80496
- GNIS feature ID: 2406851

Wedowee is a town and the county seat of Randolph County, Alabama, United States. As of the 2020 census, Wedowee had a population of 737. It was initially incorporated in 1836, but its charter lapsed by the late 19th century. It was reincorporated in 1901.

== History ==
Wedowee, which means "old water" in the Creek language, was named after a Muscogee Creek Indian chief. This area was historically occupied by the Muscogee Creek people.

Following Indian Removal of the Creek in the 1830s to Indian Territory west of the Mississippi River by the US government, this area was settled by European Americans. The town of Wedowee was designated as the county seat of Randolph County in 1835. The county was developed for the cultivation of cotton as a commodity crop, with labor primarily done by enslaved African Americans, many of whom had been sold to the Deep South from the Upper South in the domestic slave trade.

Since the late 20th century, Lake Wedowee was created by the impoundment of the Tallapoosa River. This has enhanced the tourist drawing power of the town. Also known as the R. L. Harris Reservoir, the lake draws thousands of visitors to Wedowee every year.

== Geography ==
Wedowee is located on the Piedmont plateau in the foothills of the Appalachian Mountains.

The city is located in the central part of Randolph County along U.S. Route 431, which is the main route through the city. U.S. 431 leads northwest 34 mi (55 km) to Oxford and southeast 13 mi (21 km) to Roanoke. Alabama State Route 48 also runs through the city, leading northeast 9 mi (14 km) to Woodland and west 16 mi (26 km) to Lineville.

According to the U.S. Census Bureau, the town has a total area of 3.5 square miles (9.1 km^{2}), of which 3.5 square miles (9.1 km^{2}) is land and 0.04 square miles (0.10 km^{2}) (0.85%) is water.

== Demographics ==
Historical population
Census	Pop.	Note	%±
1870	130		—
1910	435		—
1920	510		17.2%
1930	396		−22.4%
1940	525		32.6%
1950	559		6.5%
1960	917		64.0%
1970	842		−8.2%
1980	908		7.8%
1990	796		−12.3%
2000	818		2.8%
2010	823		0.6%
2020	737		−10.4%
U.S. Decennial Census; 2013 Estimate

As of the census of 2000, there were 818 people, 337 households, and 200 families residing in the town. The population density was 233.4 inhabitants per square mile (90.1/km^{2}). There were 378 housing units at an average density of 107.8 per square mile (41.6/km^{2}). The racial makeup of the town was 68.70% White, 30.20% Black or African American, 0.12% Native American, 0.49% Asian, 0.24% from other races, and 0.24% from two or more races. 0.12% of the population were Hispanic or Latino of any race.

There were 337 households, out of which 26.1% had children under the age of 18 living with them, 43.0% were married couples living together, 13.6% had a female householder with no husband present, and 40.4% were non-families. 36.5% of all households were made up of individuals, and 22.0% had someone living alone who was 65 years of age or older. The average household size was 2.23 and the average family size was 2.95.

In the town, the population was spread out, with 21.8% under the age of 18, 8.9% from 18 to 24, 27.4% from 25 to 44, 21.6% from 45 to 64, and 20.3% who were 65 years of age or older. The median age was 39 years. For every 100 females, there were 97.6 males. For every 100 females age 18 and over, there were 95.1 males.

The median income for a household in the town was $26,136, and the median income for a family was $37,292. Males had a median income of $24,250 versus $22,250 for females. The per capita income for the town was $12,638. About 17.1% of families and 20.9% of the population were below the poverty line, including 25.7% of those under age 18 and 21.4% of those age 65 or over.

== Notable people ==
- Robert Stell Heflin, former U.S. Congressman for the 3rd District of Alabama
- Hulond Humphries – former high school principal and district superintendent.
- T. Jack Lee – sixth Director of the NASA Marshall Space Flight Center in Huntsville, Alabama
- Austin MacGinnis - former college football player
- John Merrill – politician; former Secretary of State of Alabama
- Stanley O'Neal – former CEO of Merrill Lynch; currently on the board of Alcoa
- William Hugh Smith – 21st Governor of Alabama, 1868-1870
- Alvin Wright – former NFL defensive lineman

== Gallery ==
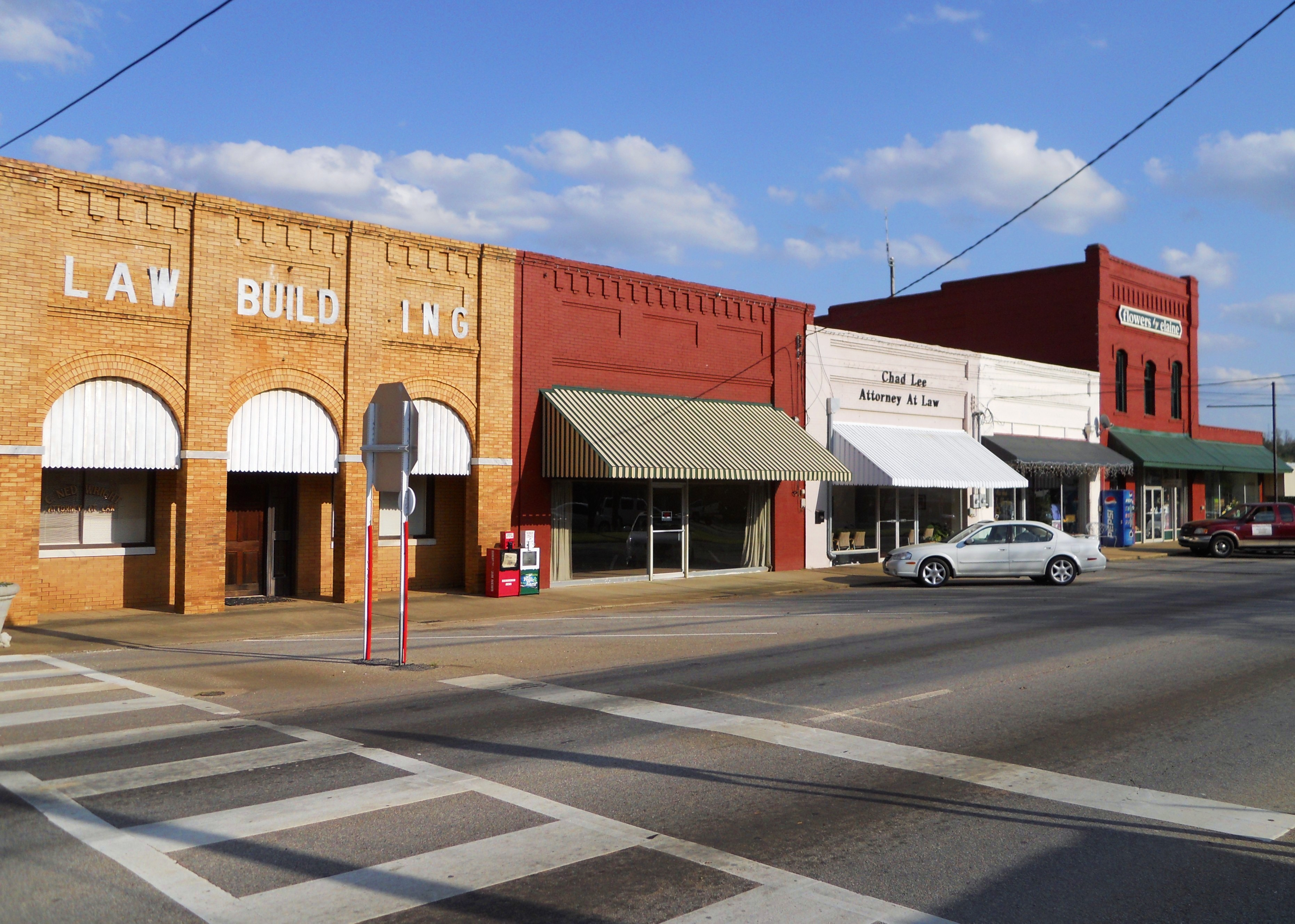
Downtown Wedowee

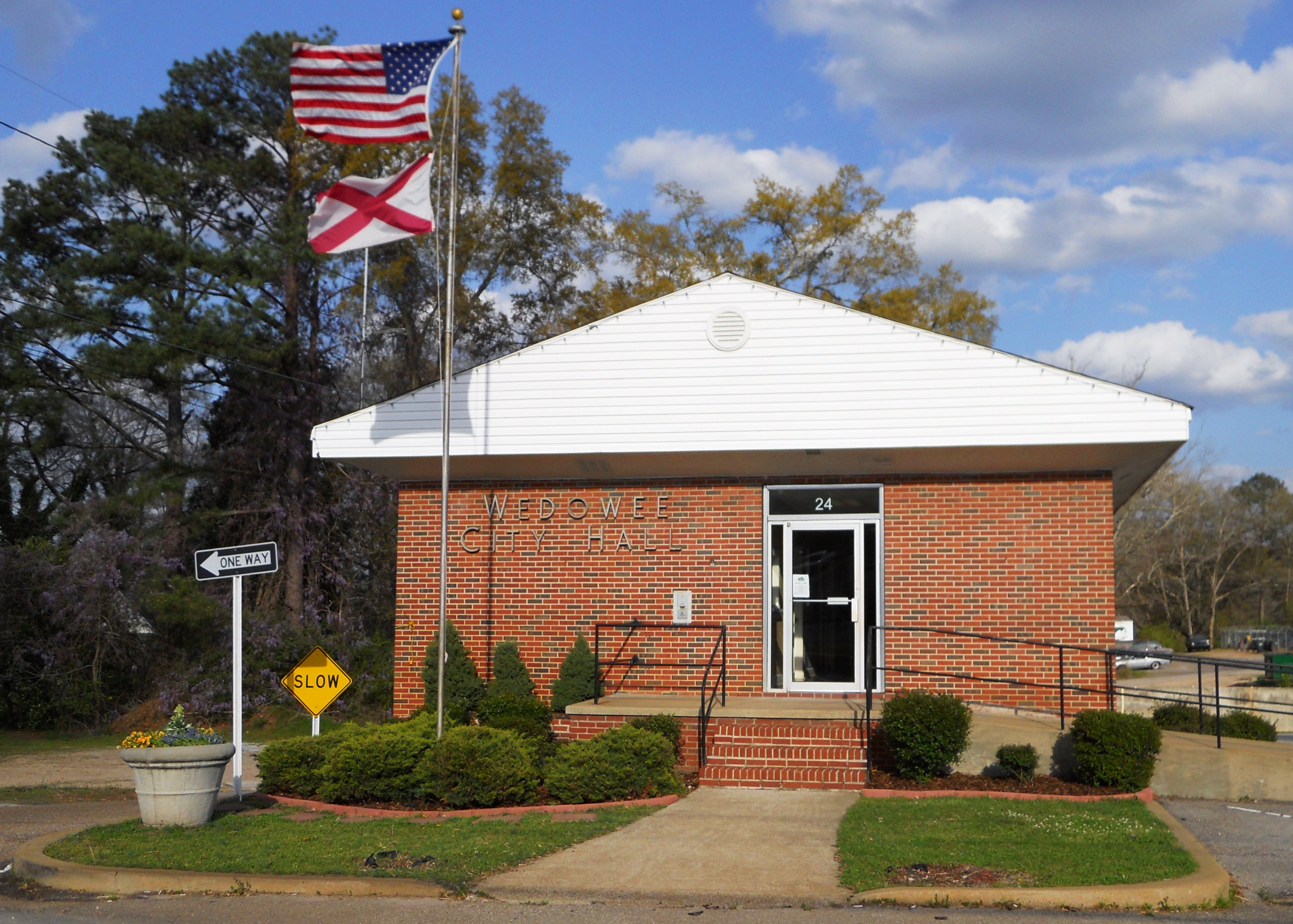
Wedowee City Hall

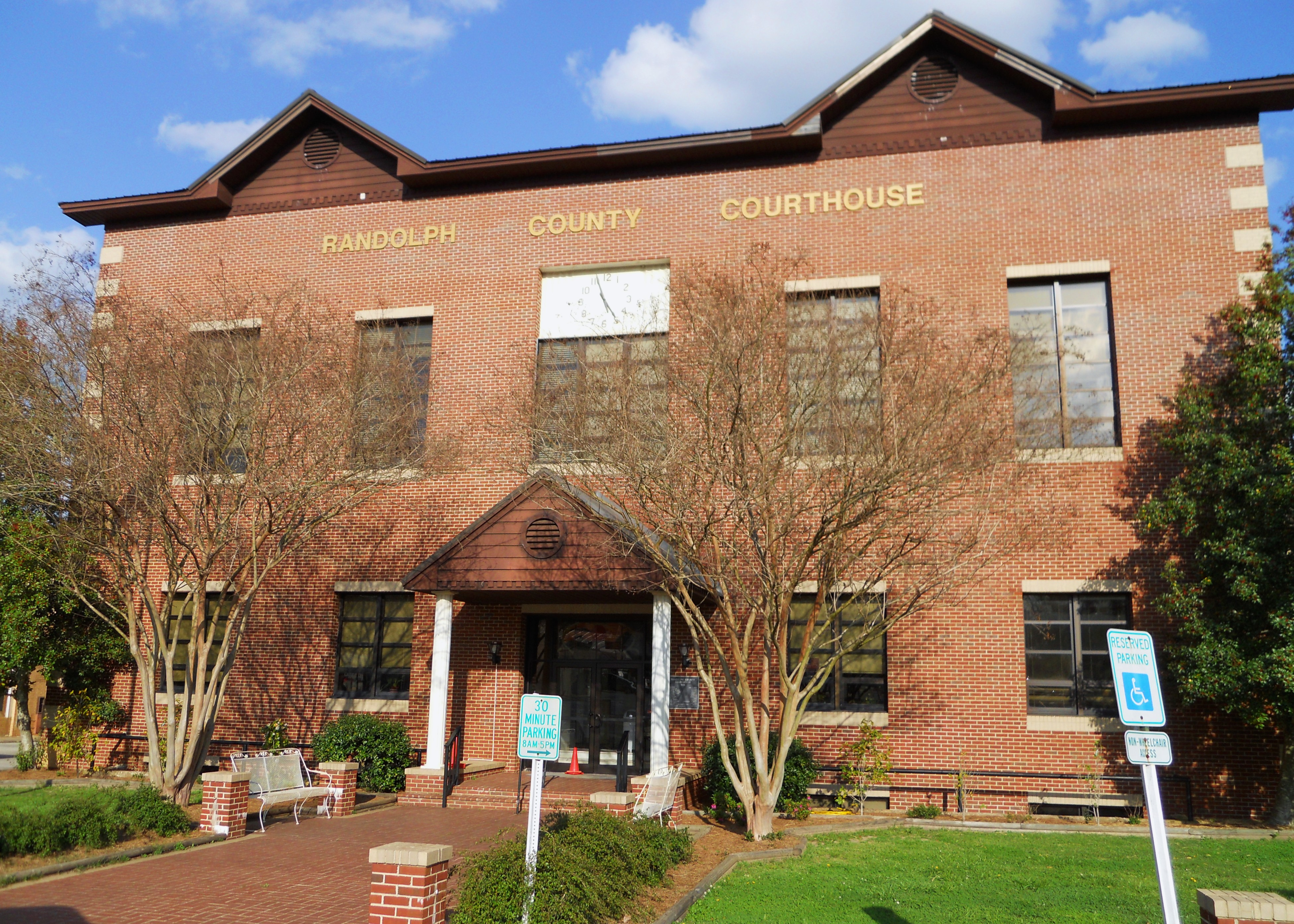
The Randolph County Courthouse is located in Wedowee.

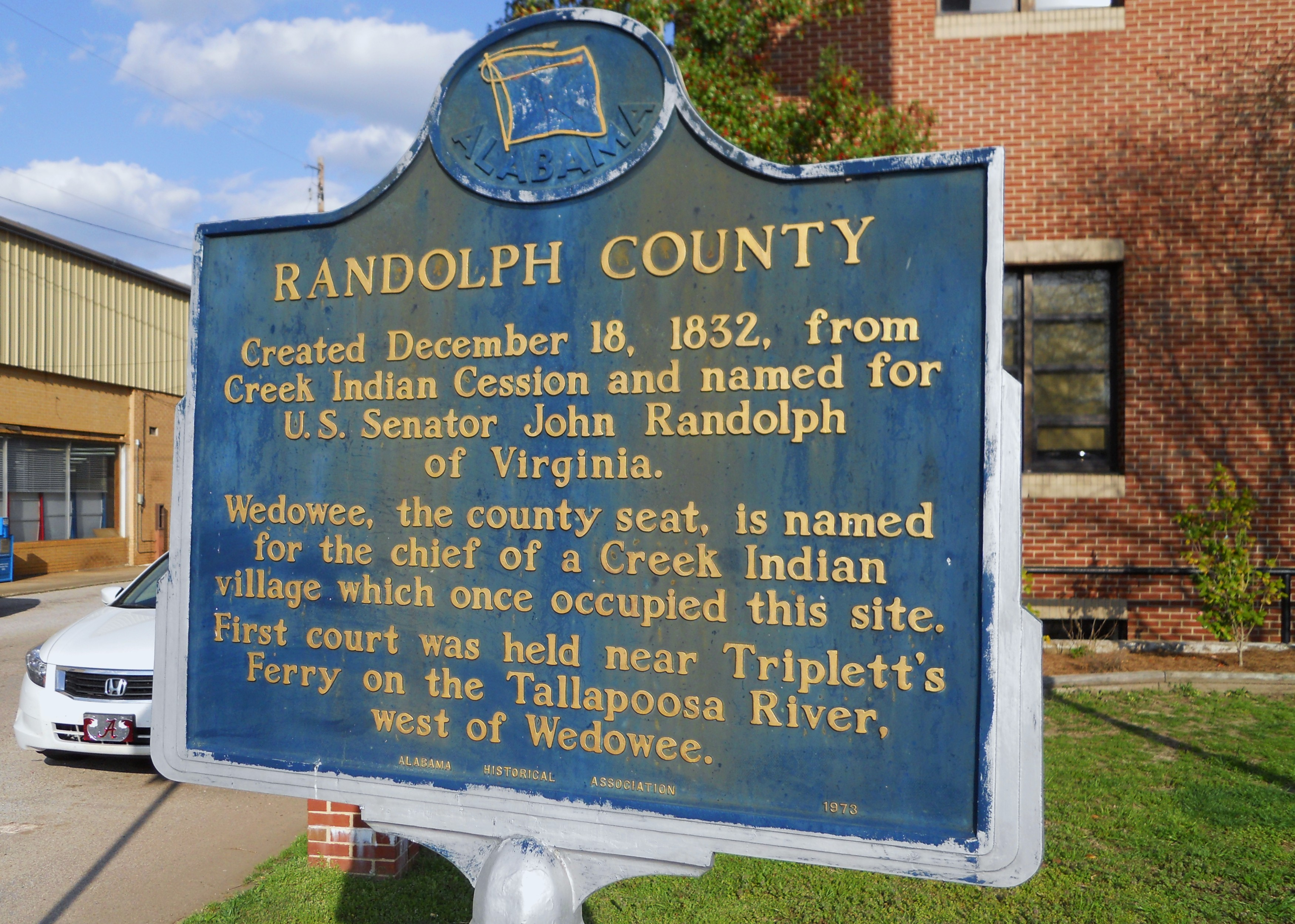
A historic marker which describes the early history of Randolph County is located on the grounds of the Randolph County Courthouse in Wedowee.

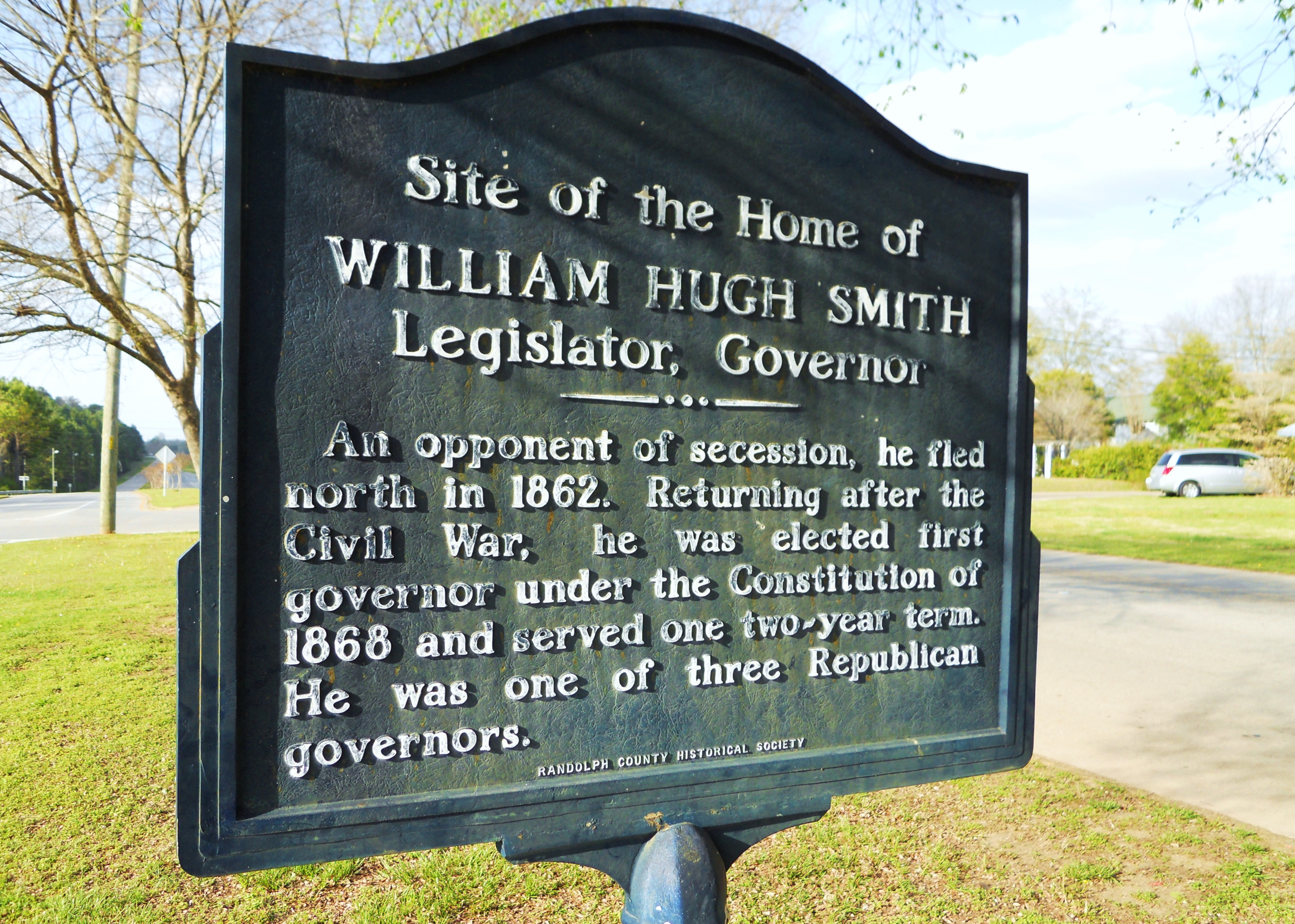
This historic marker marks the site of the home of William Hugh Smith, 21st Governor of Alabama (1868–1870).
