= Bennett =

Bennett may refer to:

== People ==
- Bennett (name), including a list of people with the surname and given name

== Places ==
=== Canada ===
- Bennett, Alberta
- Bennett, British Columbia
- Bennett Lake, in the British Columbia and Yukon Territory
  - Bennett Range
  - Bennett Lake Volcanic Complex

=== United States ===
- Bennett, Colorado
- Bennett, Iowa
- Bennett, Missouri
- Bennett, North Carolina
- Bennett, West Virginia
- Bennett, Wisconsin, a town
  - Bennett (community), Wisconsin, an unincorporated community
- Bennett County, South Dakota
- Bennett Mountain, in the Sonoma Mountains, California
  - Bennett Valley
- Bennett Township (disambiguation)

=== Elsewhere ===
- Bennett Island, in the East Siberian Sea
- Bennett Islands, Antarctica

== Education ==
- Bennett College, in Greensboro, North Carolina, U.S.
- Bennett College (New York), U.S.
- Bennett High School (disambiguation)
- Bennett Middle School, Salisbury, Maryland, U.S.
- Bennett Memorial Diocesan School, Tunbridge Wells, Kent, England
- Bennett University, Greater Noida, Uttar Pradesh, India

== Other ==
- Cocky Bennett (cockatoo)

== See also ==
- Benet (disambiguation)
- Benett
- Bennette
- Bennet (disambiguation)
- Bennett Creek (disambiguation)
- Justice Bennett (disambiguation)
- Lake Bennett (disambiguation)
