= St Benet =

St Benet (an abbreviation for St Benedict) or St Benet's may refer to:

- St Benet's, Paul's Wharf, a Welsh Anglican church in the City of London, England
- St Benet's Abbey, a medieval monastery in Norfolk, England
- St Benet's Chapel, Netherton, in Liverpool, England
- St Bene't's Church, in Cambridge, England
- St Benet's College, the 14th–19th century name of Corpus Christi College, Cambridge
- St Benet's Hall, Oxford, a hall of the University of Oxford, England
- St Benet's Multi Academy Trust, serving schools in the Diocese of Norwich, England

== See also ==
- Benet (disambiguation)
- St Benet Fink, a former church and parish in the City of London, England
- St Benet Fink Church, Tottenham, in Tottenham, London, England
- St Benet Gracechurch, a former church in the City of London, England
- St Benet Sherehog, a former church in the City of London, England
