= Bennent =

Bennent is a surname. Notable people with the surname include:

- Heinz Bennent (1921–2011), German actor
- David Bennent (born 1966), Swiss actor

== See also ==
- Bennet (disambiguation)
