= Coleridge, North Carolina =

Unincorporated community in North Carolina, US

Coordinates: 35.64°N 79.615°W

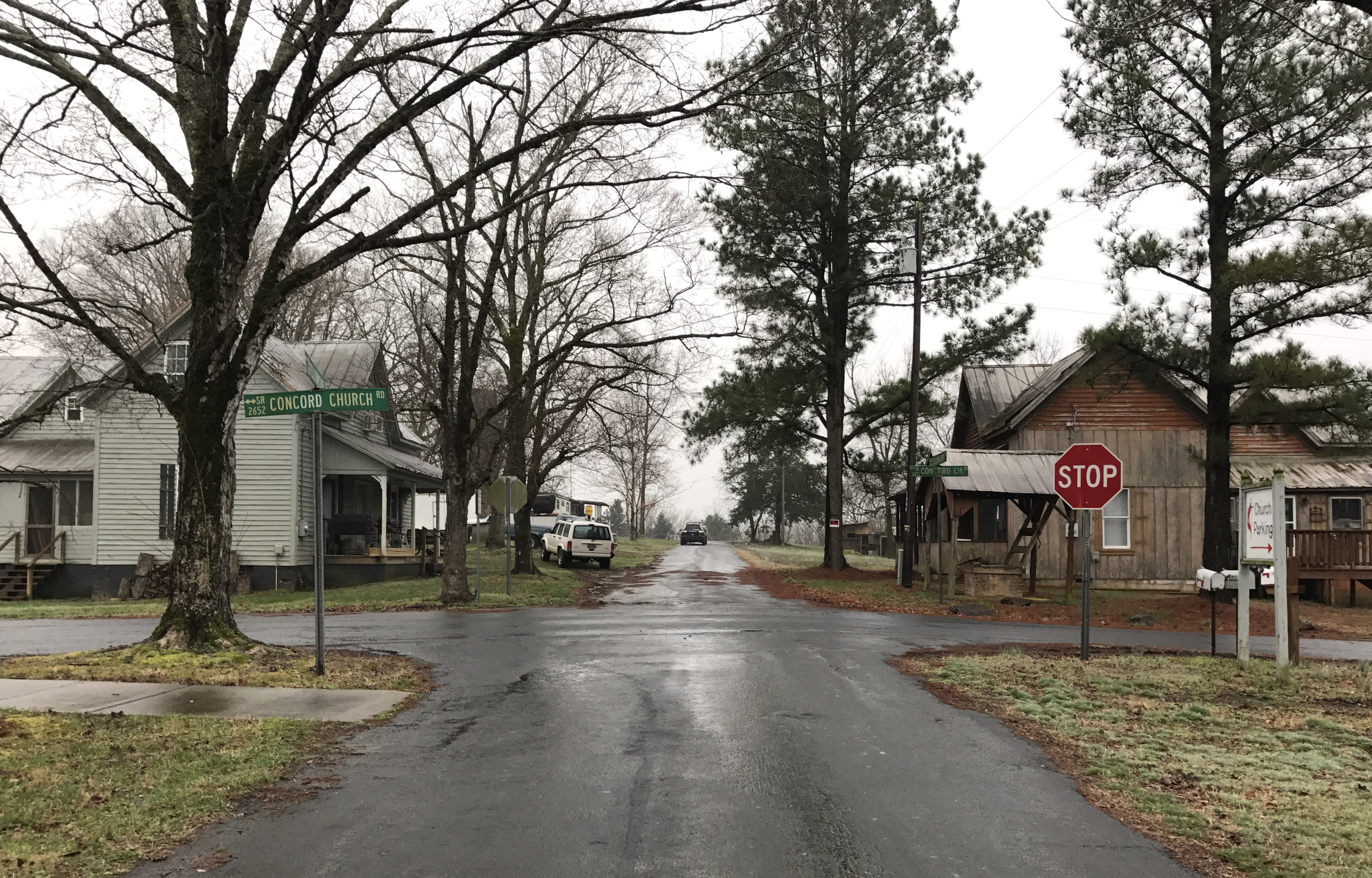
Coleridge, North Carolina

Coleridge is an unincorporated community along the Deep River in Randolph County, North Carolina, United States. It lies near Ramseur and southeast of Greensboro. Major roads through the town are Highway 22, which is joined in the middle by Highway 42, which then travels to Bennett.This community was named for James A. Cole, a local merchant. It is in the Eastern Standard Time zone UTC-5. The elevation is 436 feet. Former and merged names include Foust's Mill.

The Coleridge Historic District was added to the National Register of Historic Places in 1976.
