= John Samuel Alder =

British architect

John Samuel Alder FRIBA (13 January 1847 – 28 October 1919) was a British architect known for his church buildings.

== Life ==
Alder was born in Birmingham to Peter Alder and Eliza Pitt.

On 15 April 1884 he was married to Dorset-born Kate Beatrice Bater (1859–1946). They had three children: John Gordon (1885–1913); Marguerite Beatrice (1887–1952); and Leonard Stanley Bates (1891–1963). The family eventually settled in the Hornsey area of north London, living for a time at a house called Hillside on Muswell Road, off Colney Hatch Lane, London N10, and also at 1 Milton Park, Highgate N6.

John Samuel Alder is buried in All Saints' Carshalton.

== Career ==
He began his professional life articled to the sibling architects George Cowley Haddon (1839–85) and Henry Rockliffe Haddon (1823–93) in Malvern and Hereford. At the end of his articles he became chief assistant to Frederick Preedy (1820–98) in London, where Alder later established his own practice. From 1914 until his death his business address was Effingham House, 1 Arundel Street, Strand. In 1916 he was made a Fellow of the Royal Institute of British Architects.

From 1898 he worked in partnership with John Turrill who maintained the practice under Alder's name until at least 1924.

Apart from his work on churches, during and after his time in Preedy's office he designed and extended several country houses.

== Works ==
=== Churches ===
Alder's many churches are to be found mostly in the then rapidly spreading north London suburbs. His church buildings are notable for being not only economical to build but also spacious, in an unfussy late-gothic style; conservative for the end of the C19. He also designed church fittings.

- 1889 – St Mary Magdalene, Worcester; tower and spire.
- 1898 – St Simon, Paddington.
- 1900 – St Peter, South Tottenham.
- 1900–02 & 1909–10 – St James, Muswell Hill.
- 1902 – St Peter, Lower Edmonton; chancel, narthex and porches.
- 1903 – St Andrew, Alexandra Park Road, Muswell Hill.
- 1904 – St Saviour, Alexandra Park Road, Muswell Hill.
- 1904 – St John the Baptist, Sheepcote Road, Greenhill, Harrow.
- 1906–07 – St Cuthbert, Wolves Lane, Wood Green.
- 1906–07 – Holy Trinity, Winchmore Hill.
- 1906–7 & 1916 – St Stephen's Church, Bush Hill Park.
- 1907 – St George, Cranley Gardens, Hornsey.
- 1907 – St Mary's Church, Potton, Bedfordshire; reredos.
- 1909 – St Michael, Mora Road, Cricklewood.
- 1910 – St Michael, Wembley.
- 1910–11 – St George, Headstone, Harrow.
- 1911–12 – St Benet Fink Church, Tottenham, London.
- 1912–14 – St Barnabas, Holden Road, Woodside Park.
- 1913 – St Saviour, Sunbury-on-Thames.
- 1914 – All Saints, Campbell Road, Twickenham.
- 1914 – St Mark, Kensal Rise.
- 1914 – St Mary the Virgin and All Saints, Potters Bar.
- 1915 – St Barnabas, Cranbourne Gardens, Temple Fortune; now the Coptic Orthodox church of Saint Mary and Archangel Michael.
- 1916 – St Catherine, Dudden Hill Lane, Neasden.
- (n.d.) Other churches [...] were in Shepherd's Bush, [...] Ashford, [,,,] Harlesden, [...] and Broadstairs.
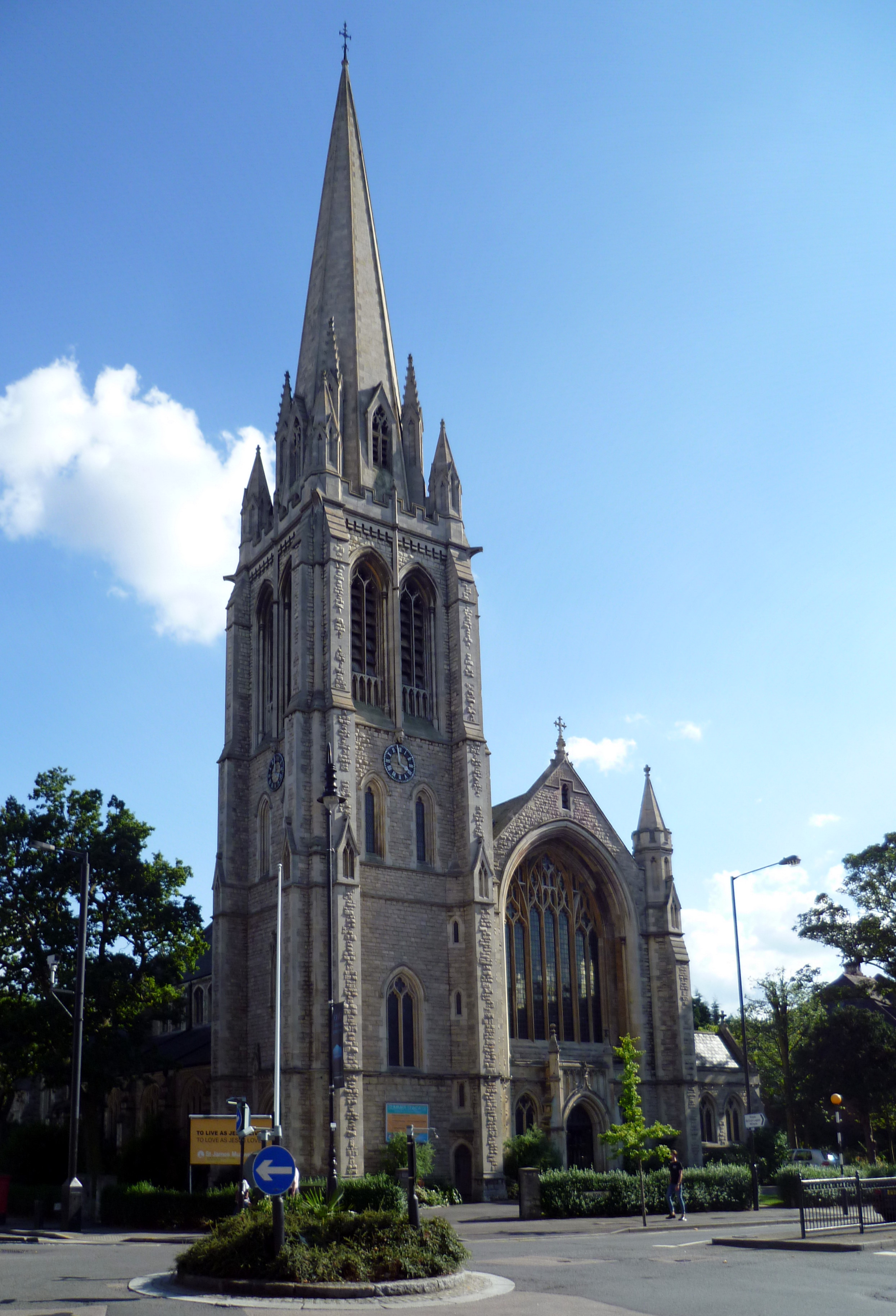
St James' Church, Muswell Hill

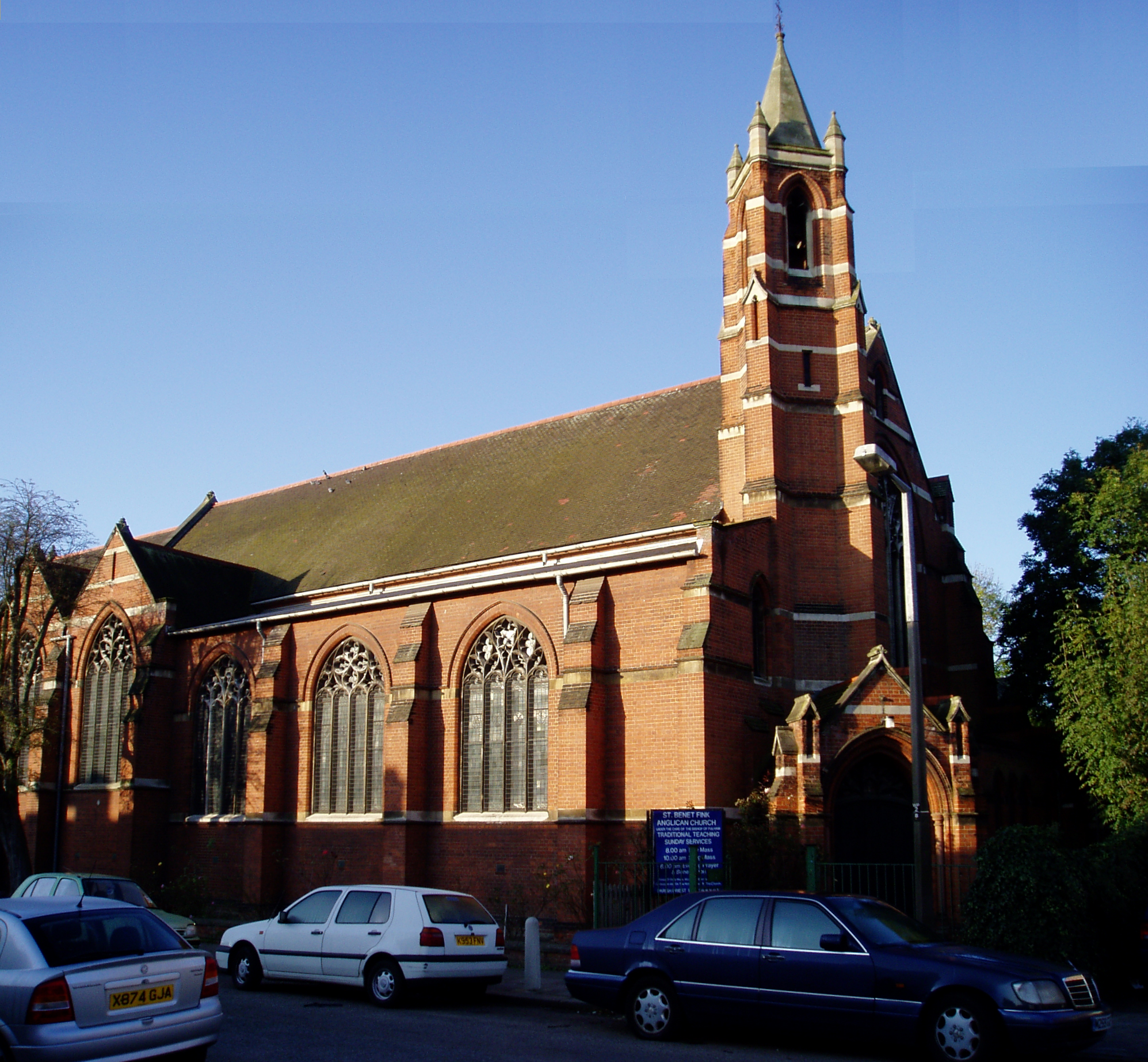
St Benet Fink, Tottenham

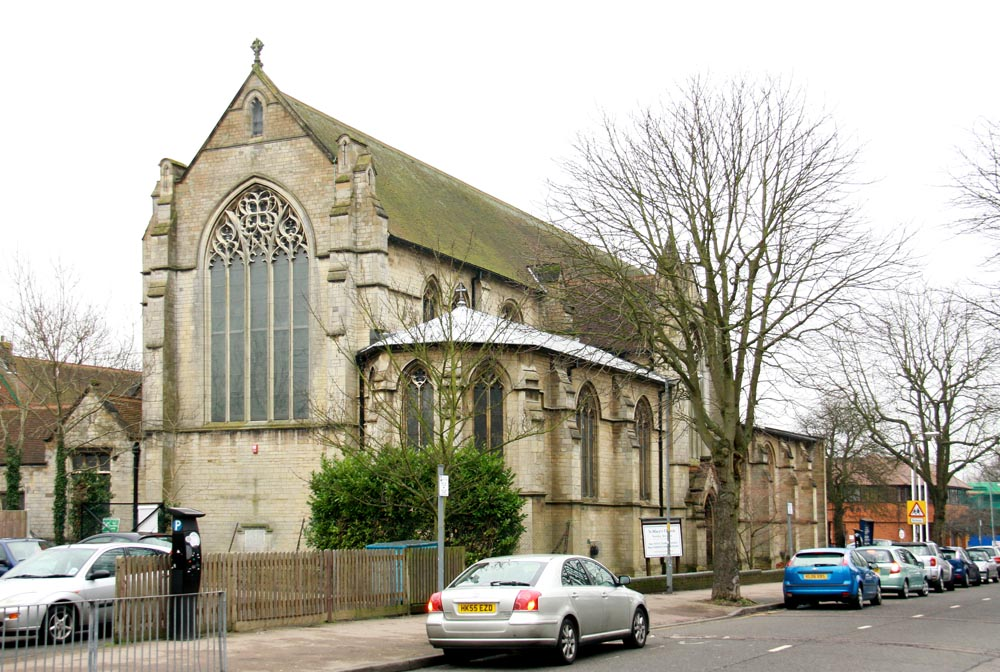
St Mary the Virgin and All Saints, Potters Bar

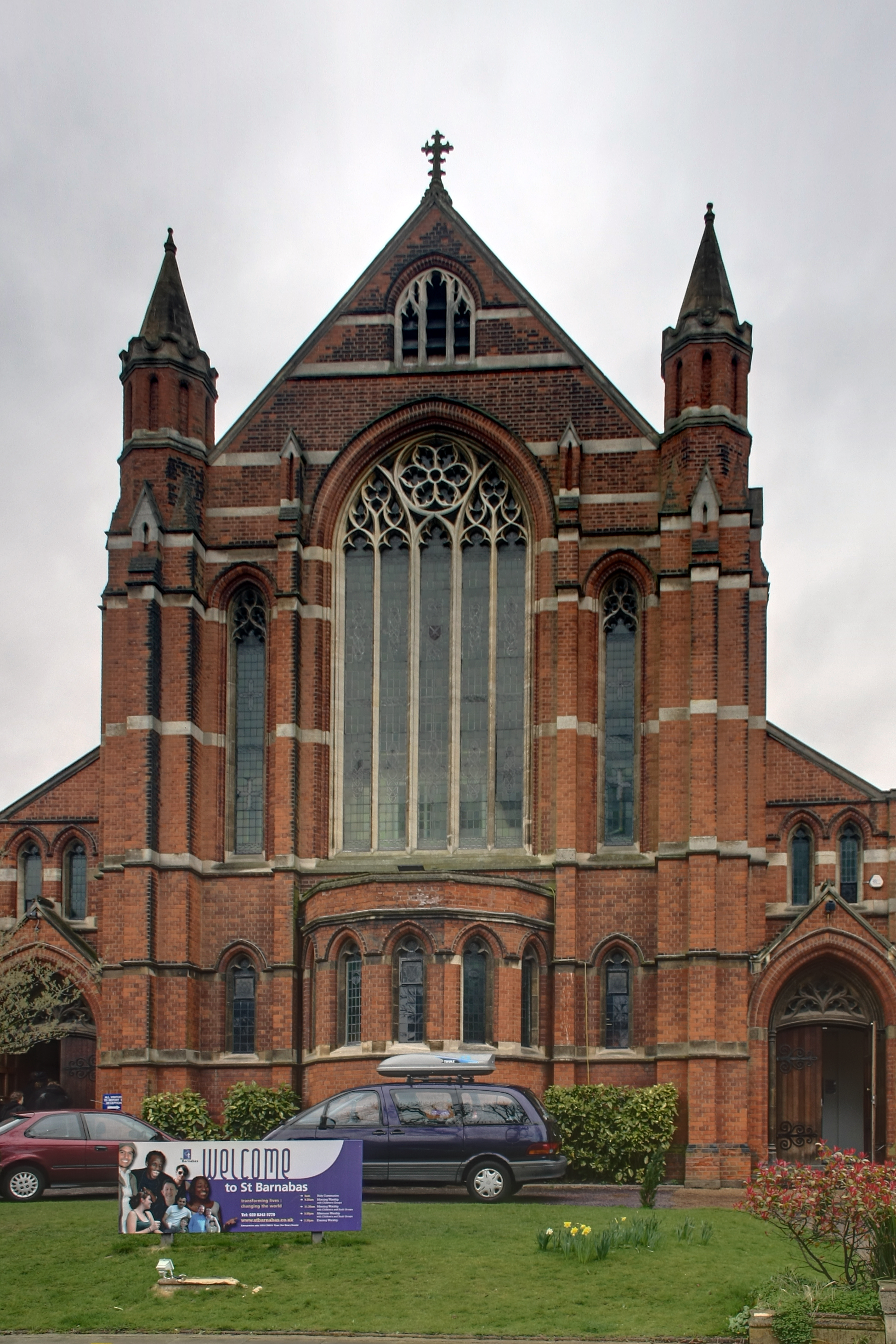
St Barnabas Woodside Park

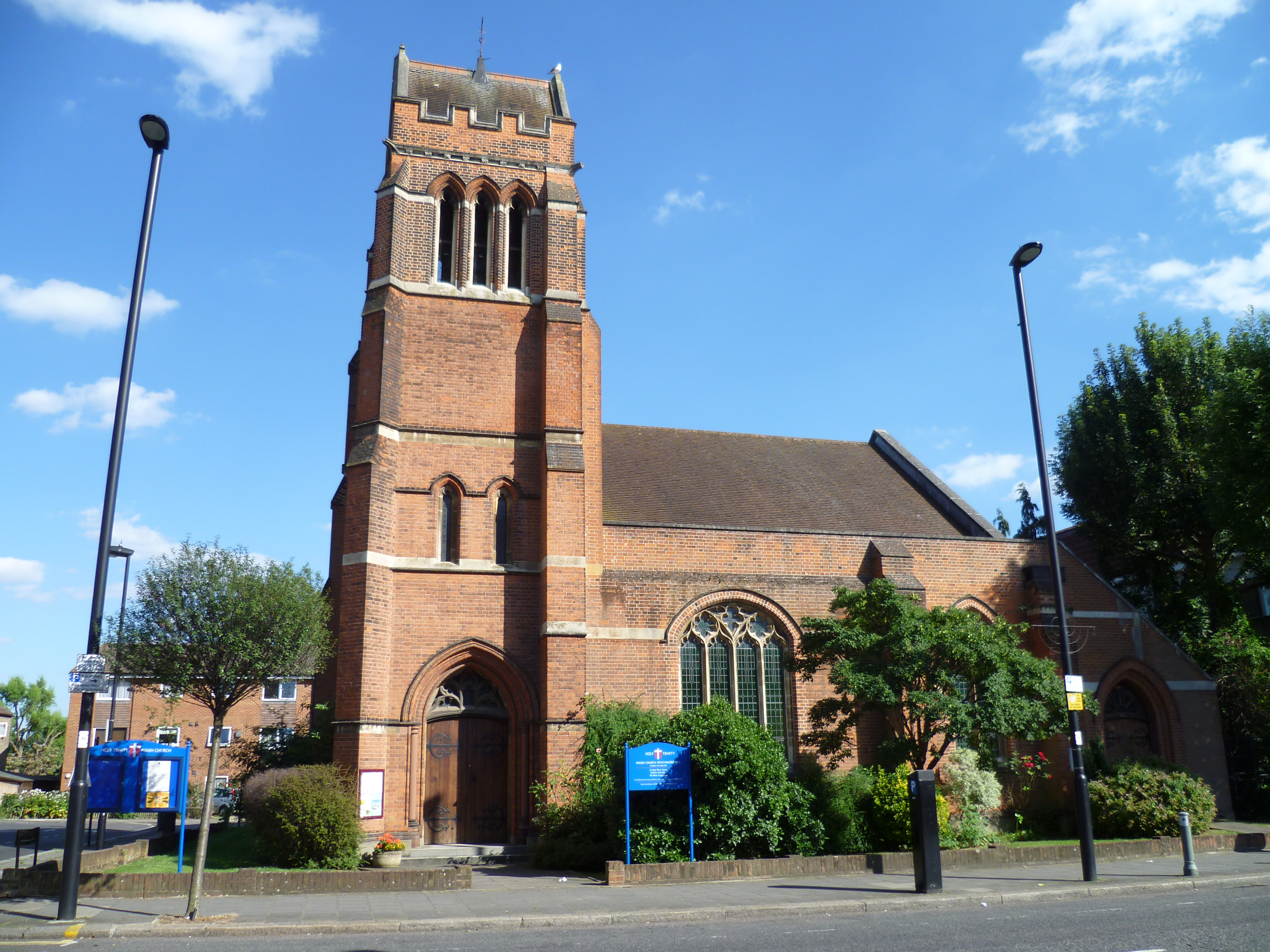
Holy Trinity Winchmore Hill

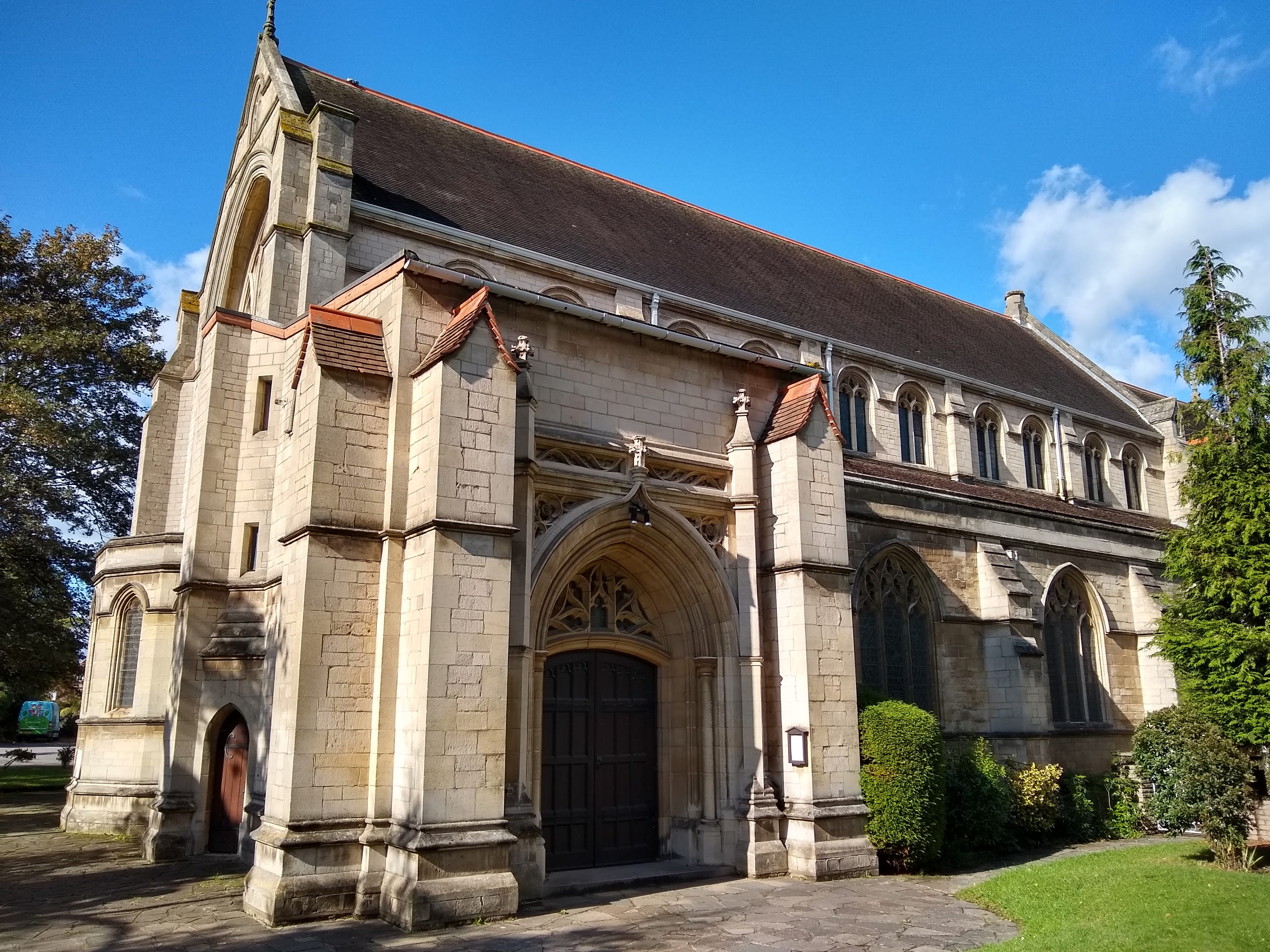
St Stephen's Church, Bush Hill Park

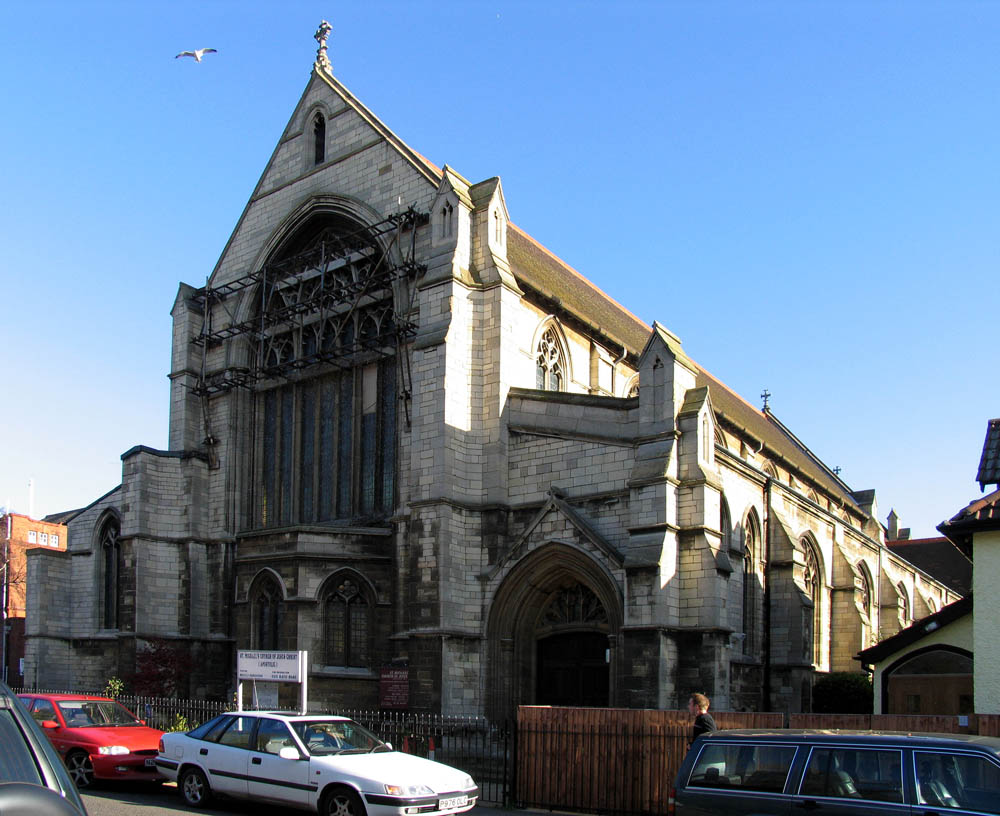
St Michael, Mora Road, Cricklewood

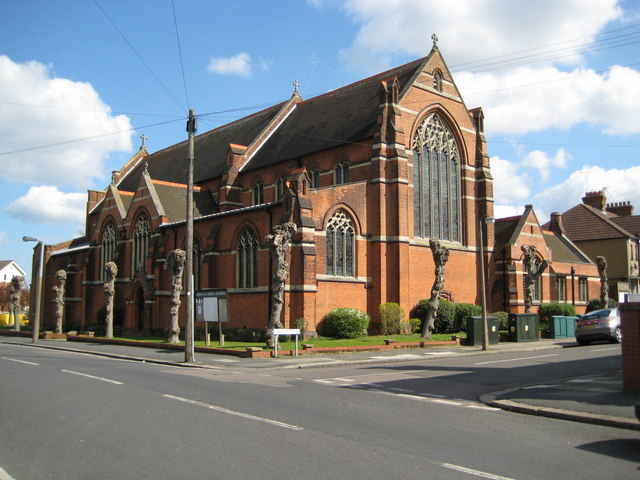
St George, Headstone, Harrow

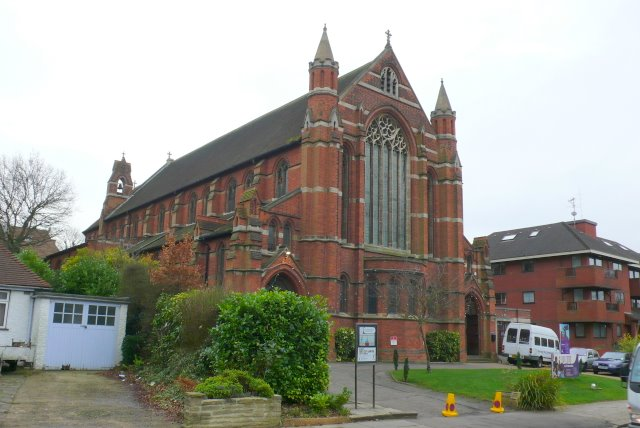
St Barnabas, Holden Road, Finchley

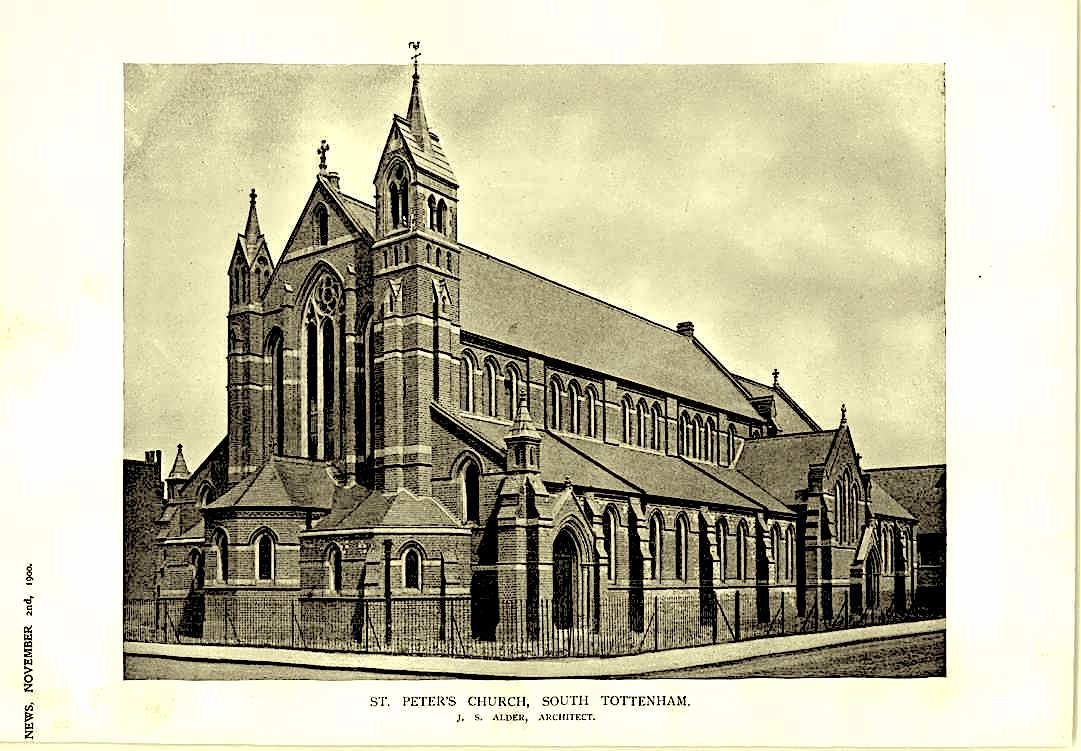
St Peter's Church, South Tottenham

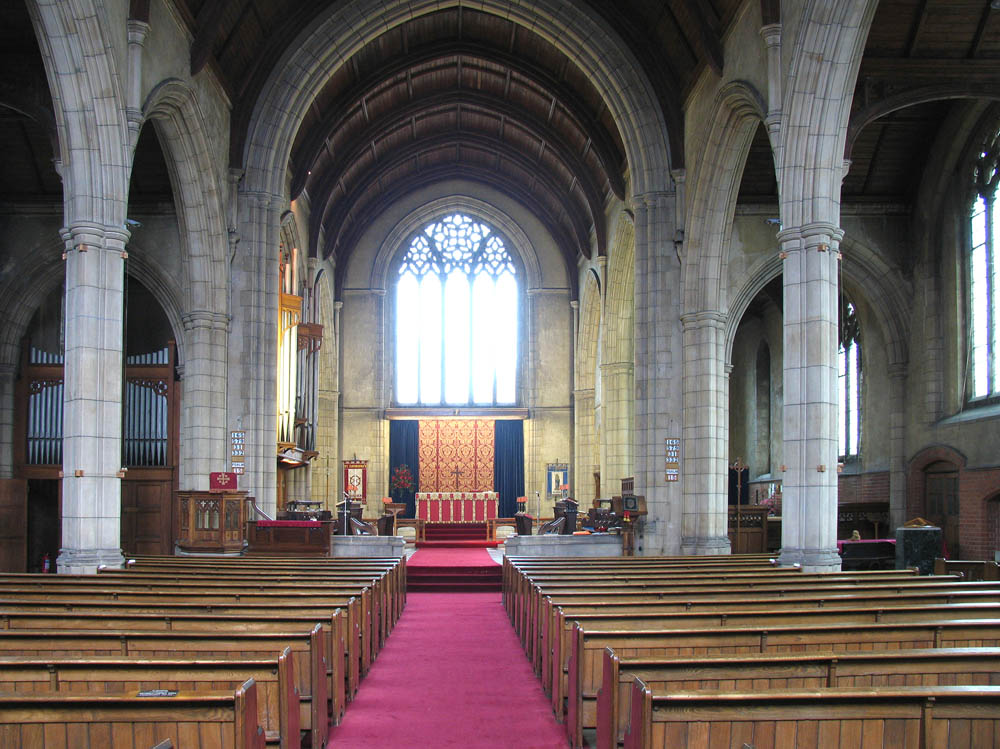
Interior of St Catherine, Dudden Hill Lane, Neasden

=== Church Halls ===
- 1905 – St Augustine, Highgate.
- 1907–08 – All Saints, Edmonton; Charles Lamb Institute.
- 1911 – St Michael and All Angels, Wood Green.
- 1913 – Holy Trinity, Granville Road, Stroud Green.
- (n.d.) All Hallows, Tottenham.
- (n.d.) St Mary, Bowes Park.
- (n.d.) and others at Mill Hill, Potters Bar, Walham Green, Islington, Holloway, Cricklewood, Palmers Green, Twickenham, Temple Fortine and Marylebone.
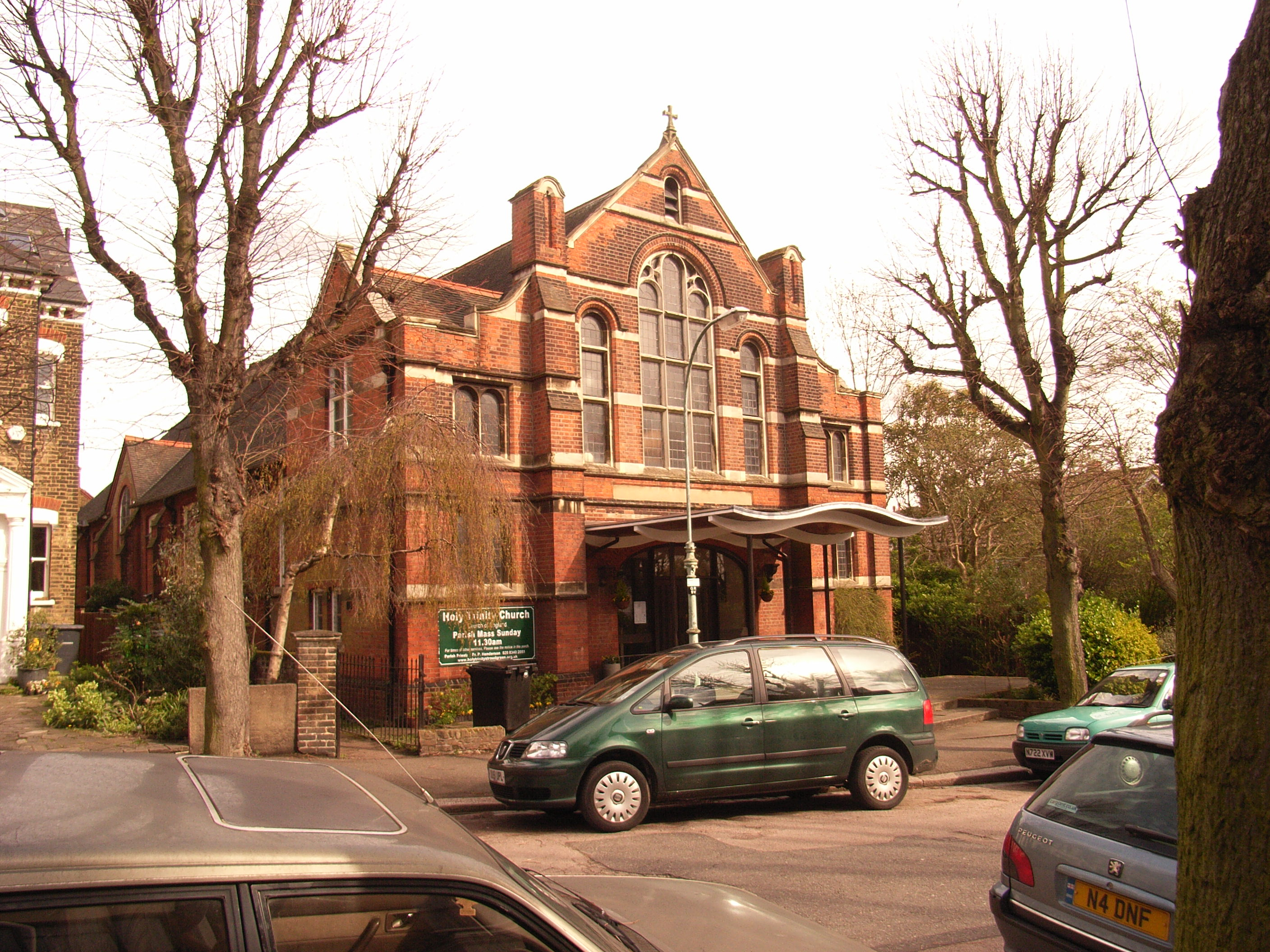
Holy Trinity (former church hall), Stroud Green

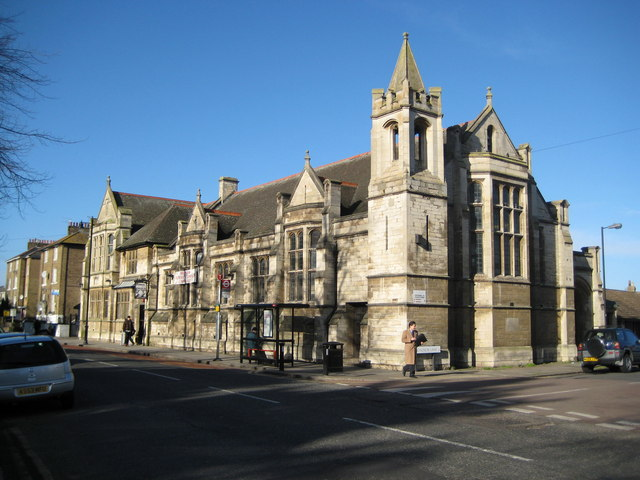
Lamb's Institute, All Saints, Edmonton

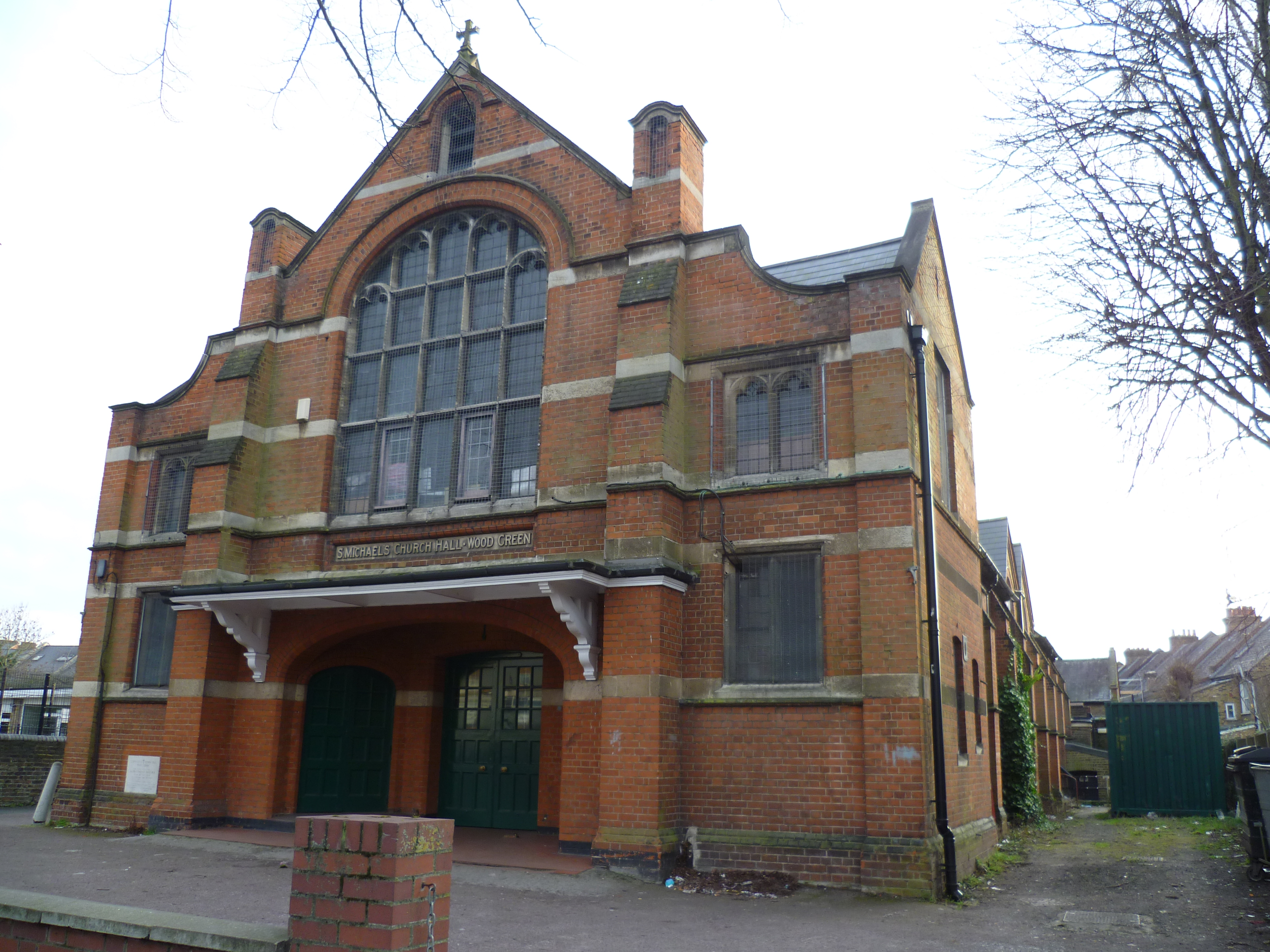
St Michael's Church Hall, Wood Green

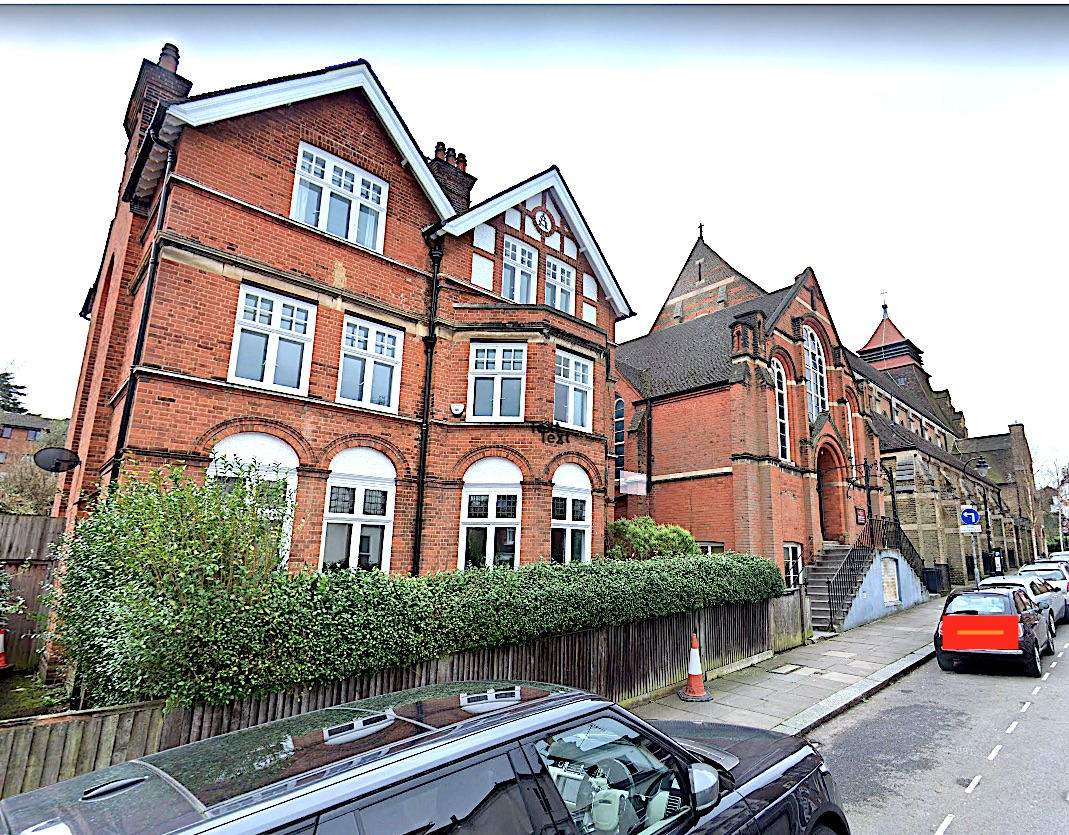
Vicarage and hall to the church of St Augustine Highgate

=== Houses ===
Apart from his work on churches, during and after his time in Preedy's office he designed and extended several country houses, often undertaking dramatic reconstructions.

- 1888 – Temple Grafton Court, Warwickshire.
- 1898 – Vicarage to the church of St Simon, Paddington.
- 1890 – Madresfield Court, Malvern, Worcestershire; subsidiary work.
- 1901 – Vicarage to the church of St Augustine, Highgate.
- 1903 – Vicarage to the church of St Mark Noel Park, London.
- 1904 – Manor House, Ponsbourne Park.
- 1907–08 – Warleigh Manor, Somerset; alterations,
- 1912 – Vicarage to the church of St Benet Fink Church, Tottenham, London.
- (n.d.) – Vicarage to the church of St Andrew, Alexandra Park Road.
- (n.d.) – "Six houses in at Muswell Hill".
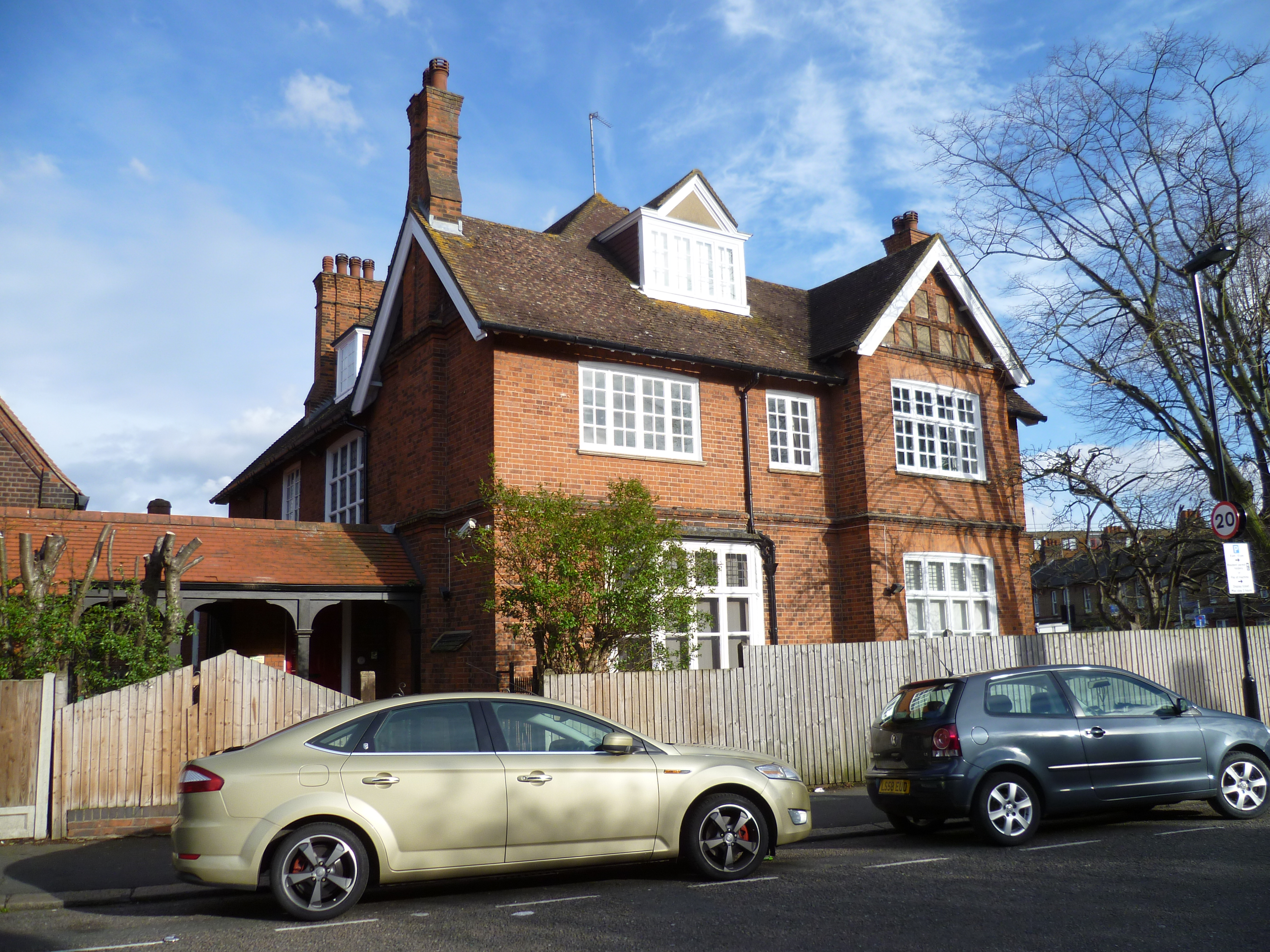
Vicarage to the church of St Mark Noel Park

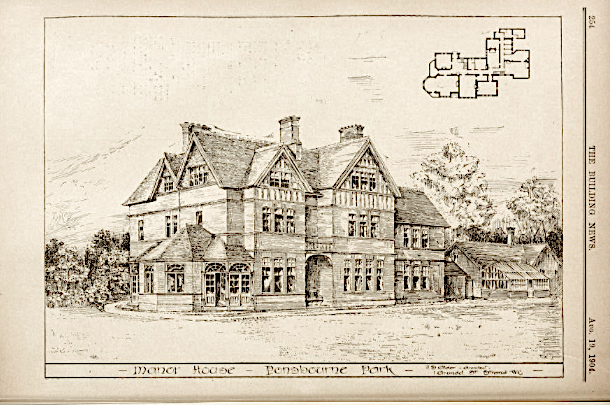
Manor House, Ponsbourne Park

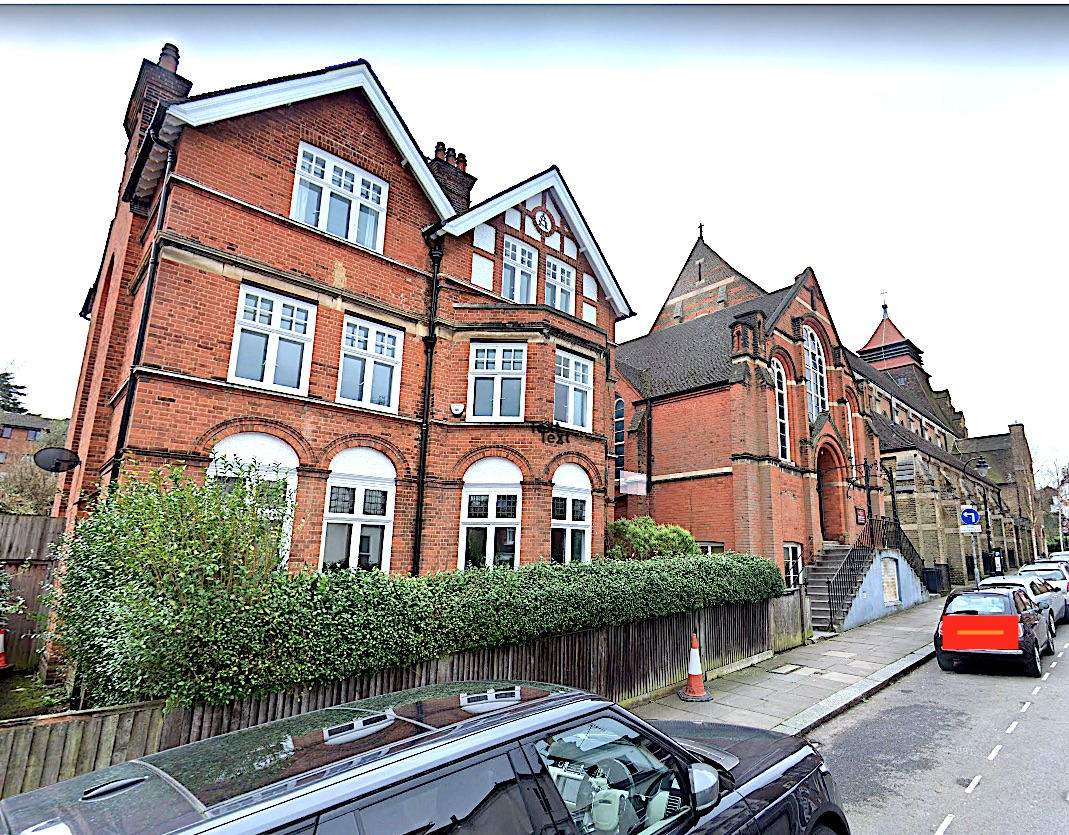
Vicarage and hall to the church of St Augustine Highgate
