= St Stephen's Church, Bush Hill Park =

Church in Enfield, London

- Parish Church of Stephen, Bush Hill Park
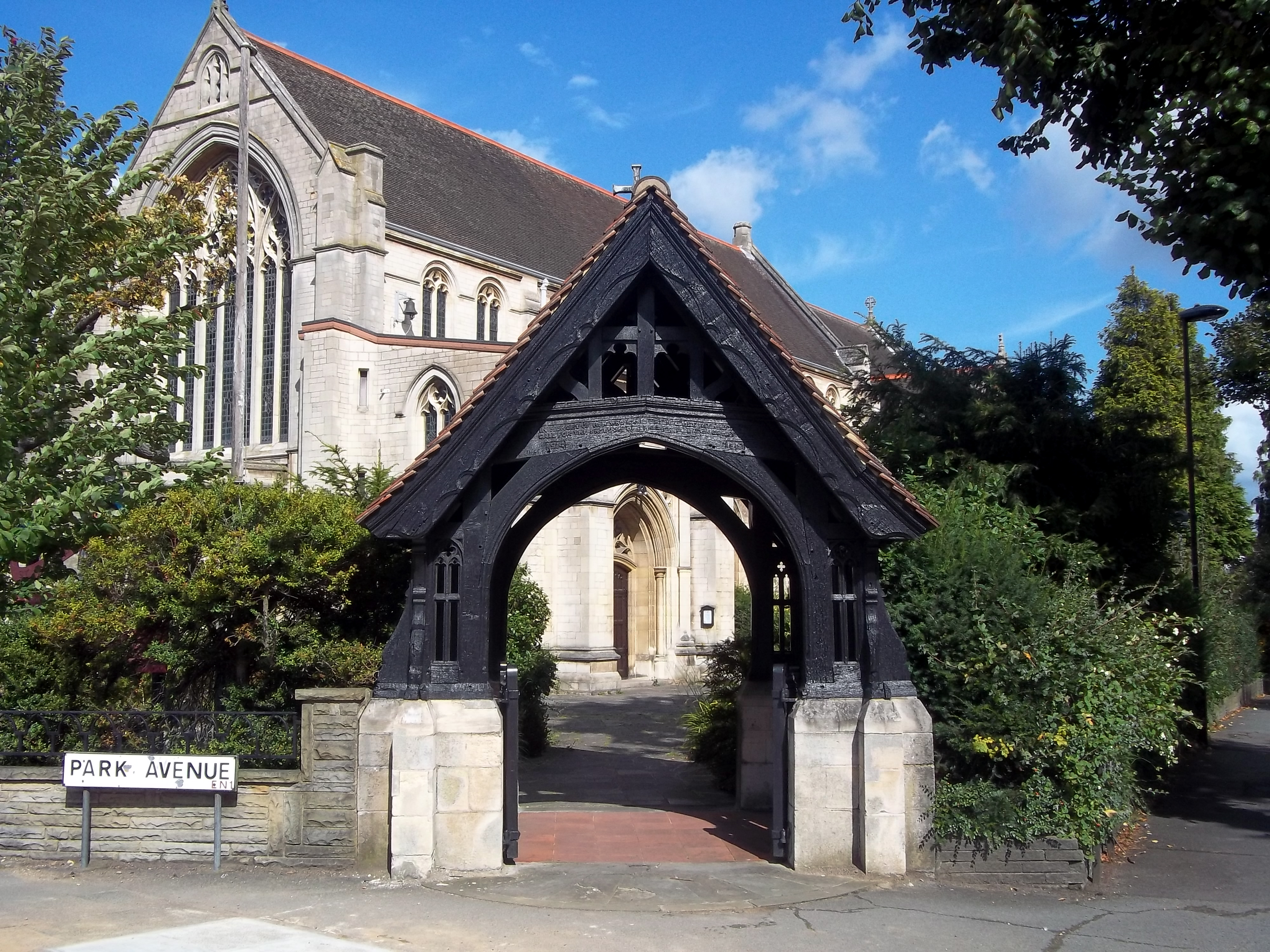
- St Stephen's Church and lychgate war memorial

- 51.6417°N 0.0786°W
- Location: Park Avenue, EN1 2ET
- Country: England
- Denomination: Church of England
- Tradition: Modern Catholic
- Website: https://www.london.anglican.org/directory/st-stephen-bush-hill-park/

History
- Founded: 1901
- Dedicated: 1907

Architecture
- Architect: John Samuel Alder (1847-1919)
- Style: Early English Gothic
- Years built: 1906-16

Administration
- Province: Canterbury
- Diocese: Diocese of London
- Archdeaconry: Hampstead
- Deanery: Enfield

Clergy
- Vicar: Preb. Dr. Amatu Christian-Iwuagwu

St Stephen's Church is a Church of England church in Park Avenue, Bush Hill Park in the London Borough of Enfield.

== History ==
The first St Stephen's was a simple temporary building (’iron church’) put up in 1901 as a chapel of ease to All Saints Church in Edmonton. In 1906 work began on a permanent church to a gothic design by John Samuel Alder (1847-1919) with walls built of Stamford stone, with Welden stone for the corners. Bath stone is used for the windows and pillars and York stone for the steps. The church was lit by electricity. The chancel, lady chapel, organ bay, clergy and choir vestries and three bays of the nave and aisles were completed in 1907 at a cost of £6,000, and consecrated that year by the Bishop of London. In 1909 St Stephen's became a separate parish. Completion of the church, which in 1912 was estimated to cost a further £4,800, was achieved in 1916, but the planned-for tower and spire were never built.

=== Clergy ===
- 1901–35 Edwards Forbes M.A. Curate-in Charge then (1907) Minister, then (1908) Vicar-designate then (1909) Vicar.
  - 1916 An additional priest was provided for occasional duties at a cost of £50 provided by the Edmonton Parish Clergy Fund.
  - 1928–41 Henry Staples, Curate.
- 1935–40 Harold Wood, M.A. L.Th. Vicar.
- 1940–41 Henry Staples, Priest-in Charge.
- 1941–1957 George Moore A.K.C. Vicar.
  - 1941–?56 G. Scovell, Curate.
  - 1956 An assistant curate appointed but ill health precluded him taking up the post.
- 1957–80 Maurice S. Baylis, B.A. Vicar.
  - 1962–?67 John Rogan, Curate.
  - 1967–?69 John Paget, Curate.
  - 1969–72 Denis Morgan, Curate.
  - 1972–75 Rodney Warner, Curate.
  - 1976–79 Alan Scott, Honorary Curate.
  - 1979–84 David Dewey, Honorary Curate.
- 1980–1986 Geoffrey Brown, Vicar.
  - 1981–84 Reginald Bowder, Curate.
  - 1984–88 Paul Taylor, Curate.
- 1987–2013 Rodney Annis, Vicar.
- 2013–19 Paul Atherton. Priest-in-Charge.
  - 2013–19 Stephen Heard, Non-stipendiary Minister.
  - 2017–21 Jeremy Foot, Non-stipendiary Minister.
- 2020– Amatu Christian-Iwuagwu. PhD. Vicar.

== Design ==
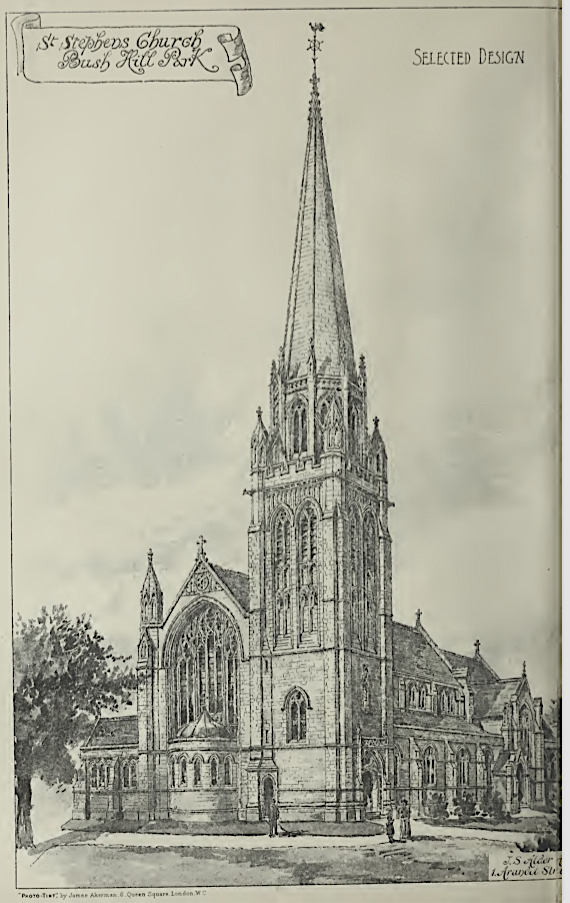
Architect's drawing of St Stephen's Parish Church; seen from Park Avenue

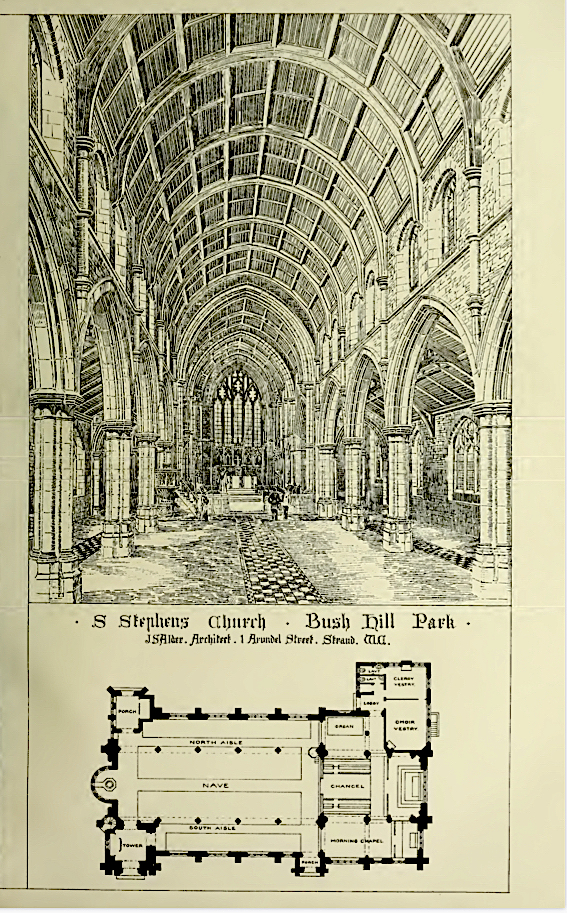
Architect's drawing of St Stephen's Parish Church; interior

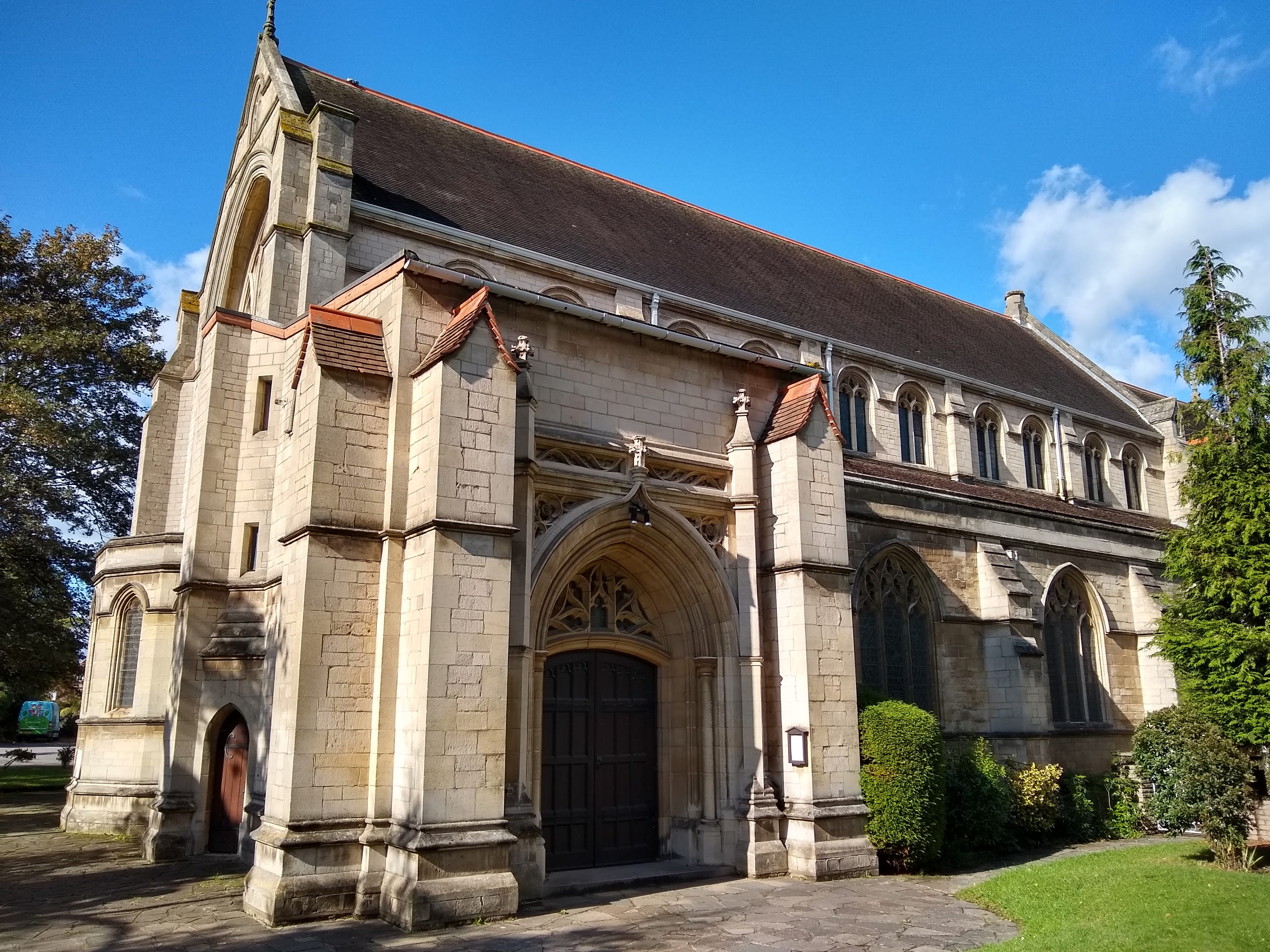
St Stephen's Parish Church, Bush Hill Park south-west entrance under the truncated tower

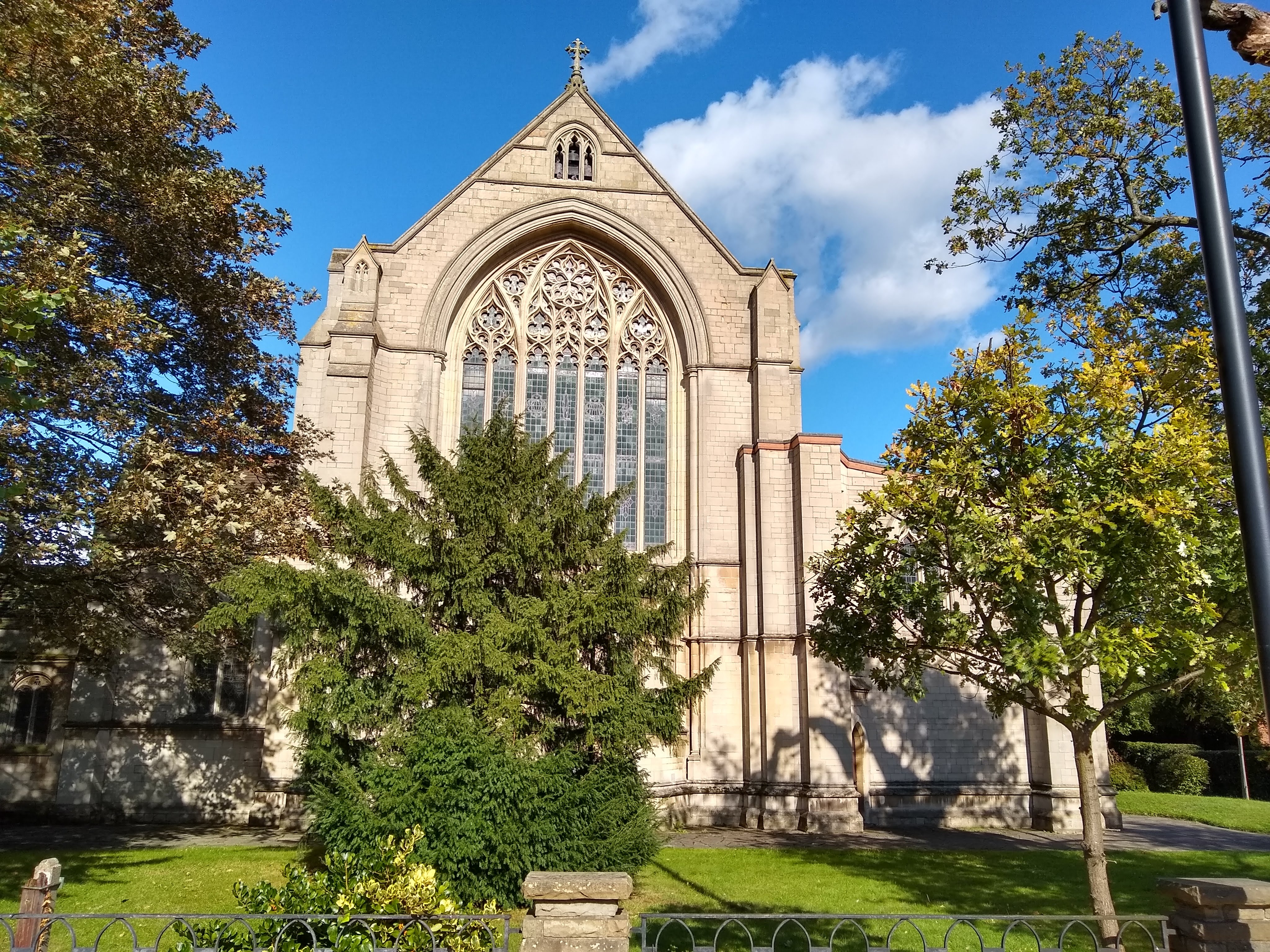
St Stephen's Parish Church, Bush Hill Park; the west front, from the street

In the 22 August 1917 edition of The Building News and Architectural Journal (p. 144) the completed building was described as follows:

It comprises of a nave 84ft long and 27ft wide; aisles of the same length and 12 ft wide; chancel 41 ft long and 24ft wide; lady chapel of the same length and 15ft wide; organ aisle and clergy and choir vestries, with folding doors between, to admit of use as one large room for parish meetings, etc. There are, in addition, a recessed baptistry at west end of nave, and a tower porch at west end of south aisle, and two other entrnnce porches. The nave and chancel are of lofty proportions, with traceried clerestory windows, and an opened timbered and panelled roof of arched form; and there are handsome arcades with stone pillars and richly moulded arches, dividing the nave and chancel from the aisles and lady chapel. Large traceried windows are a feature at east and west ends of the church. At present only the lower stage of the tower has been built, up to the height of clerestory window-sills; but, when completed, the tower and spire, rising to a height of 170ft will be an important feature, and a landmark for many miles round. The general style of the church is Decorated Gothic [...] the walls throughout, inside and out, are faced with Casterton free stone, roughly chiselled. The roofs are covered with rough red hand-made tiles, floors laid with marble mosaic, or with wood blocks under the seats, which are of oak. The accomodation provided is for 750 persons [...] and the builders Messrs. John Bentley & Sons, of Walthan Abbey.

== Stained Glass ==
St Stephen's church has a number of twentieth-century decorated windows.

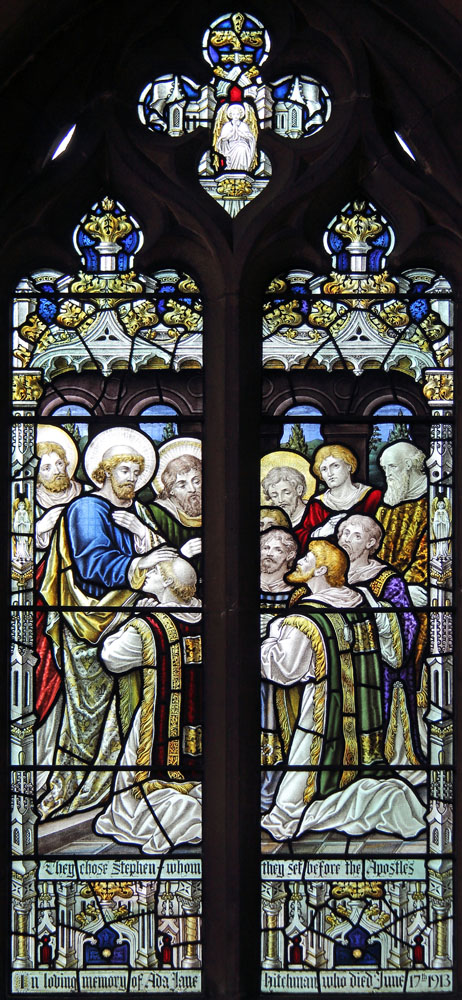
Stained-glass depiction (c.1915) of St Stephen the Martyr.

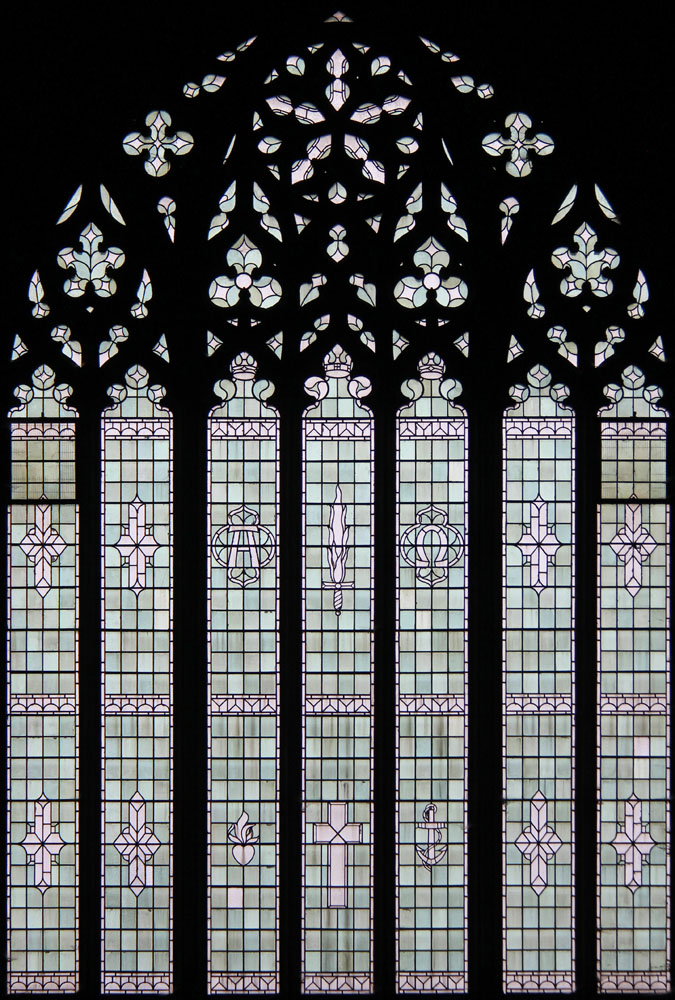
Decorated window (c.1917) at the west end of the nave.

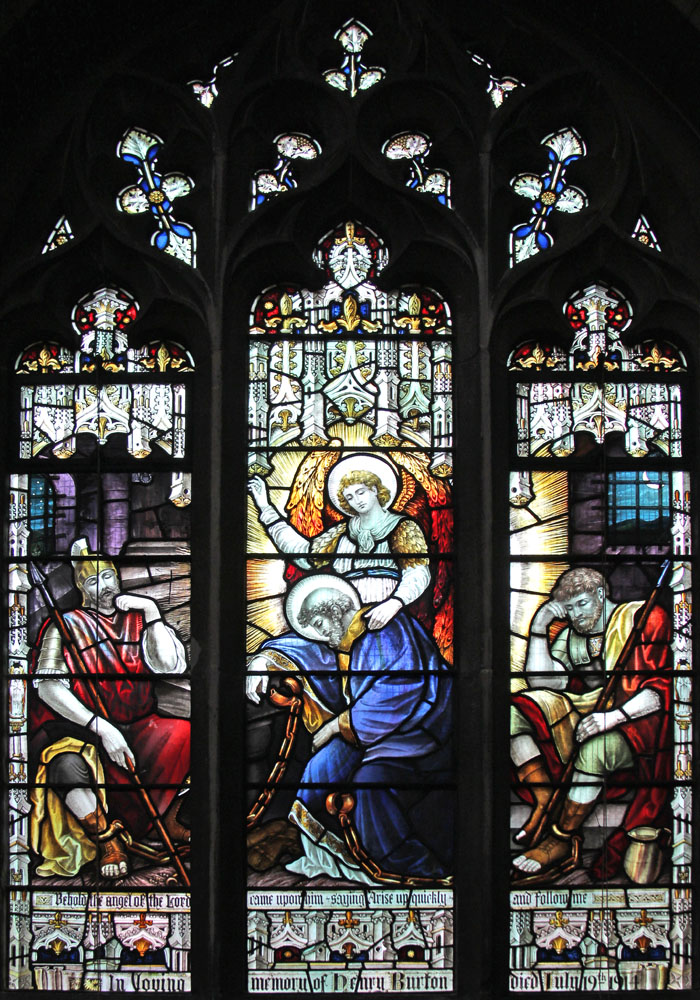
Stained-glass depiction (1920s) of St Paul the Evangelist in prison.

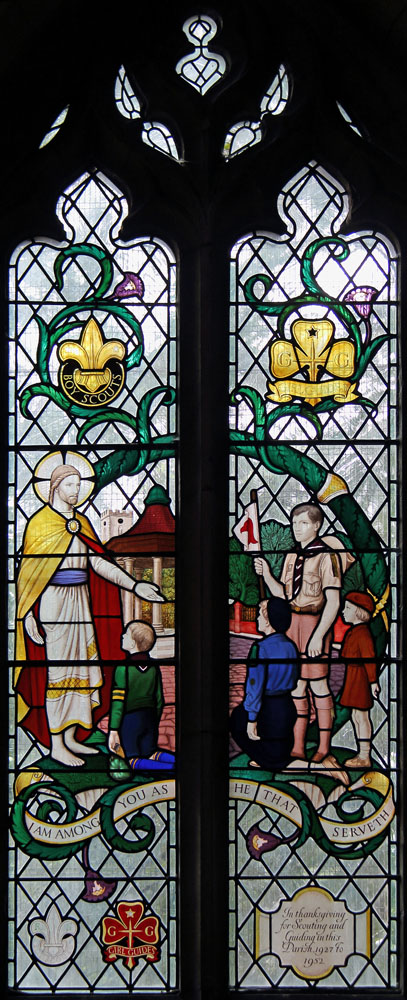
Stained-glass depiction (1952) of parish youth organisations.

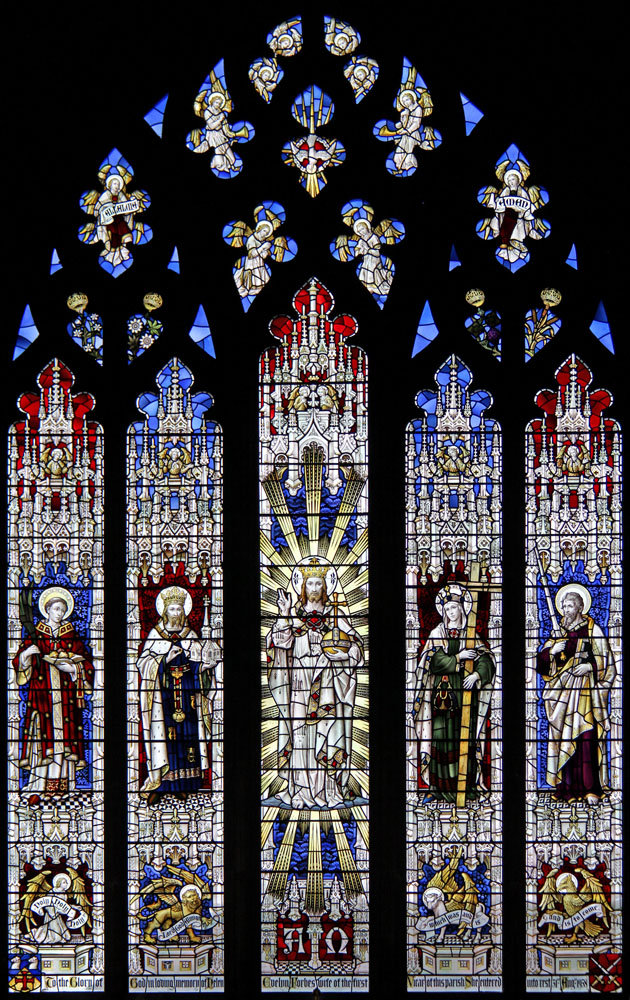
Stained-glass window (1946) at the east end of the nave; a memorial to Helen Forbes (d.1938) the wife of the first Vicar.

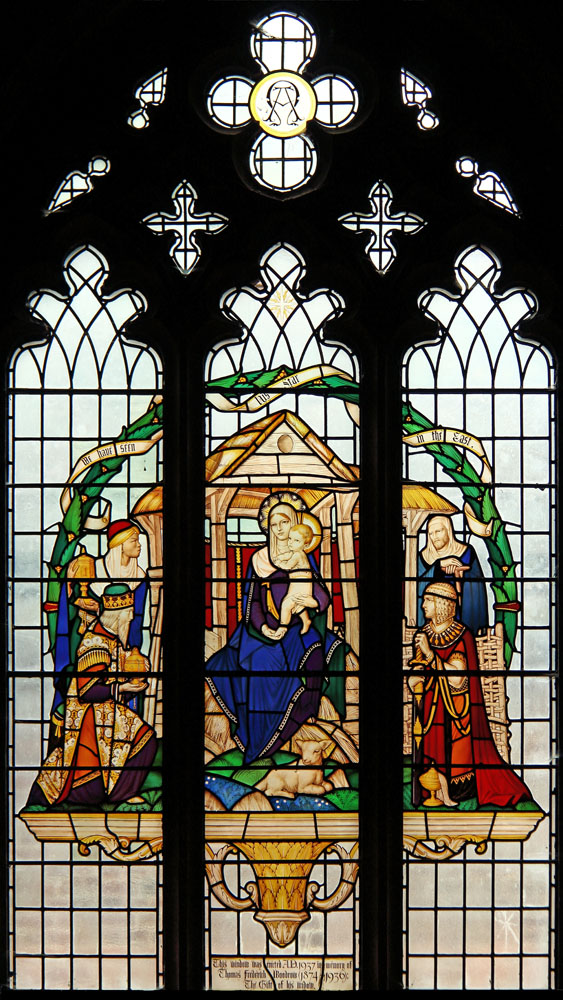
Stained-glass depiction (1950s) of the Adoration of the Magi.

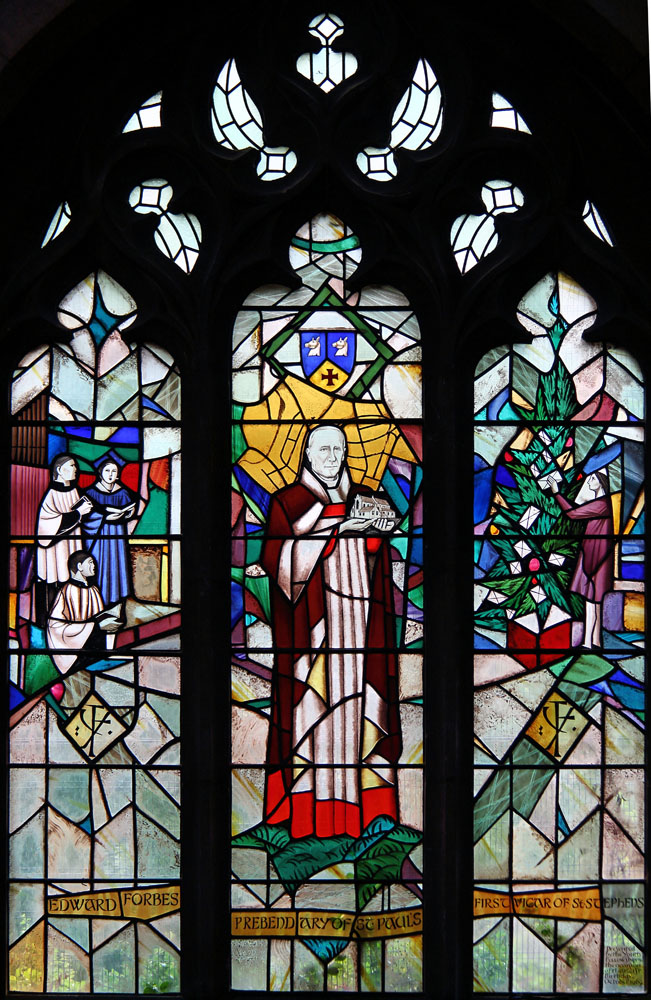
Sttained glass memorial (1969) to the first Vicar of St Stephen's, Edward Forbes (1863-1941).

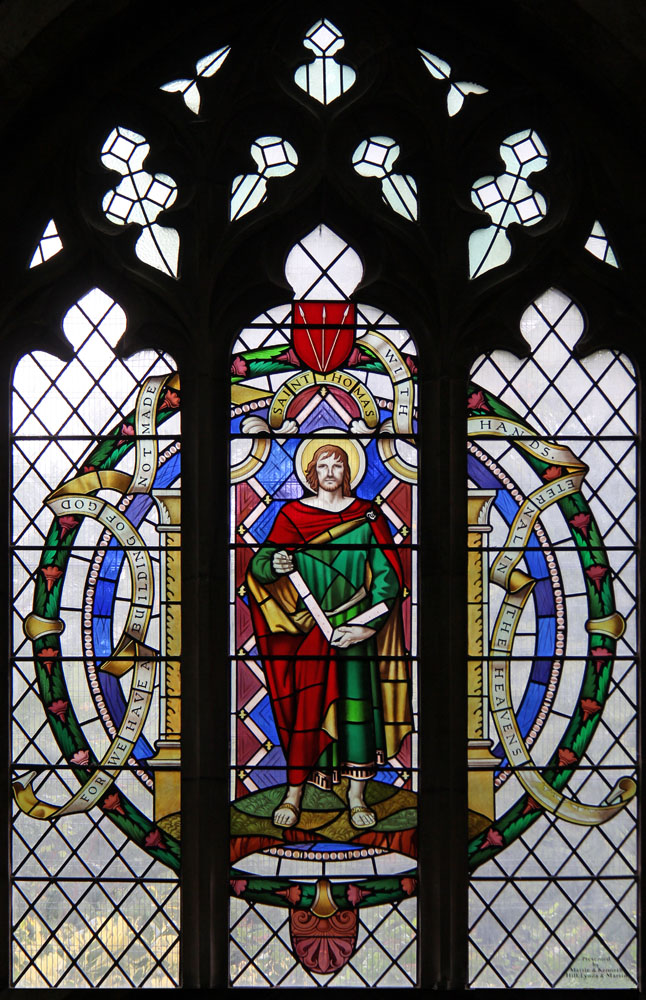
Stained glass depiction (1960s) of St Thomas the Apostle.

== Organ ==
The parish's first pipe organ (1-manual and pedal) was built for the temporary church building by the firm of Henry Jones. It was later moved to the church of St Alphege Edmonton. The present 3-manual instrument was installed in 1908, built by the Norwich-based firm of Norman and Beard. The original cost of the present instrument was £1,150. The imposing carved organ case is a gift from the first vicar, Edward Forbes (1863-1941), as a memorial to his father.

As a mark of the importance of the St Stephen's organ to the nation's heritage, being of special interest and warranting every effort to preserve, it has been awarded an Historic Organ Certificate by the British Institute of Organ Studies, the amenity society for the British organ, which lobbies Government, Historic England and other national bodies. Notwithstanding the instrument's significance it is in poor repair and unused.

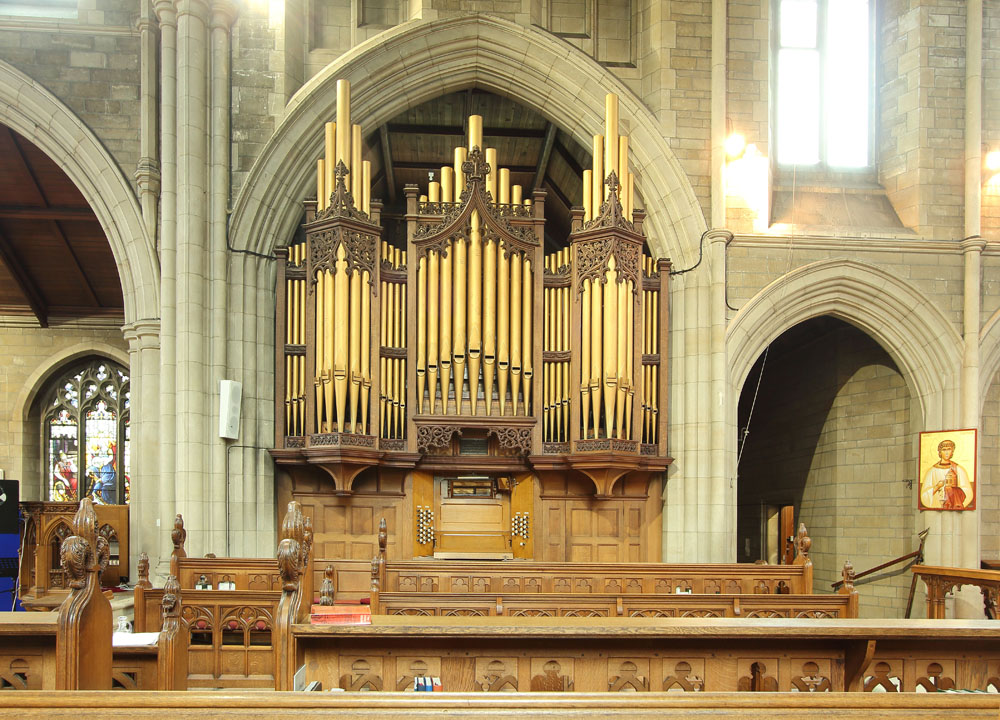
St Stephen's Parish Church, Bush Hill Park - organ facade (1908)

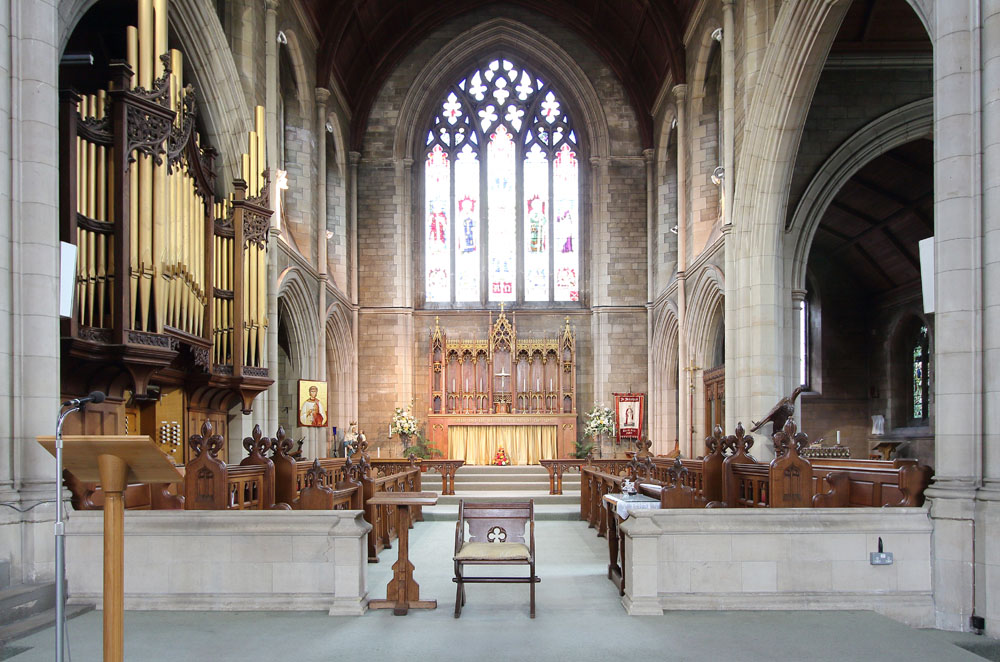
St Stephen's Parish Church, Bush Hill Park - the chancel, showing the position of the organ

=== Organists ===
- 1901–27 Mr C. Albright.
  - ?–? Mr W. W. Stockley | Choirmaster.
  - ?–1923 Mr Green | Choirmaster.
- 1927–1963 Mr. T. Edward Hopkins (d.1978).
  - 1957 Mr Ian Henderson | Assistant Organist.
  - 1958–1963 Mrs Mollie Wade | Assistant Organist.
- 1963–1982 Mrs Mollie Wade
  - 1967–? Mr Peter Bullet | Assistant Organist.
- 1982–1987 Mr Alistair Young.
- 1987–1989 Mr Mark Amey
  - 1988–1989 Mr Ian Graydon | Assistant Organist
- 1989–? Mr Ian Graydon

== Lychgate ==
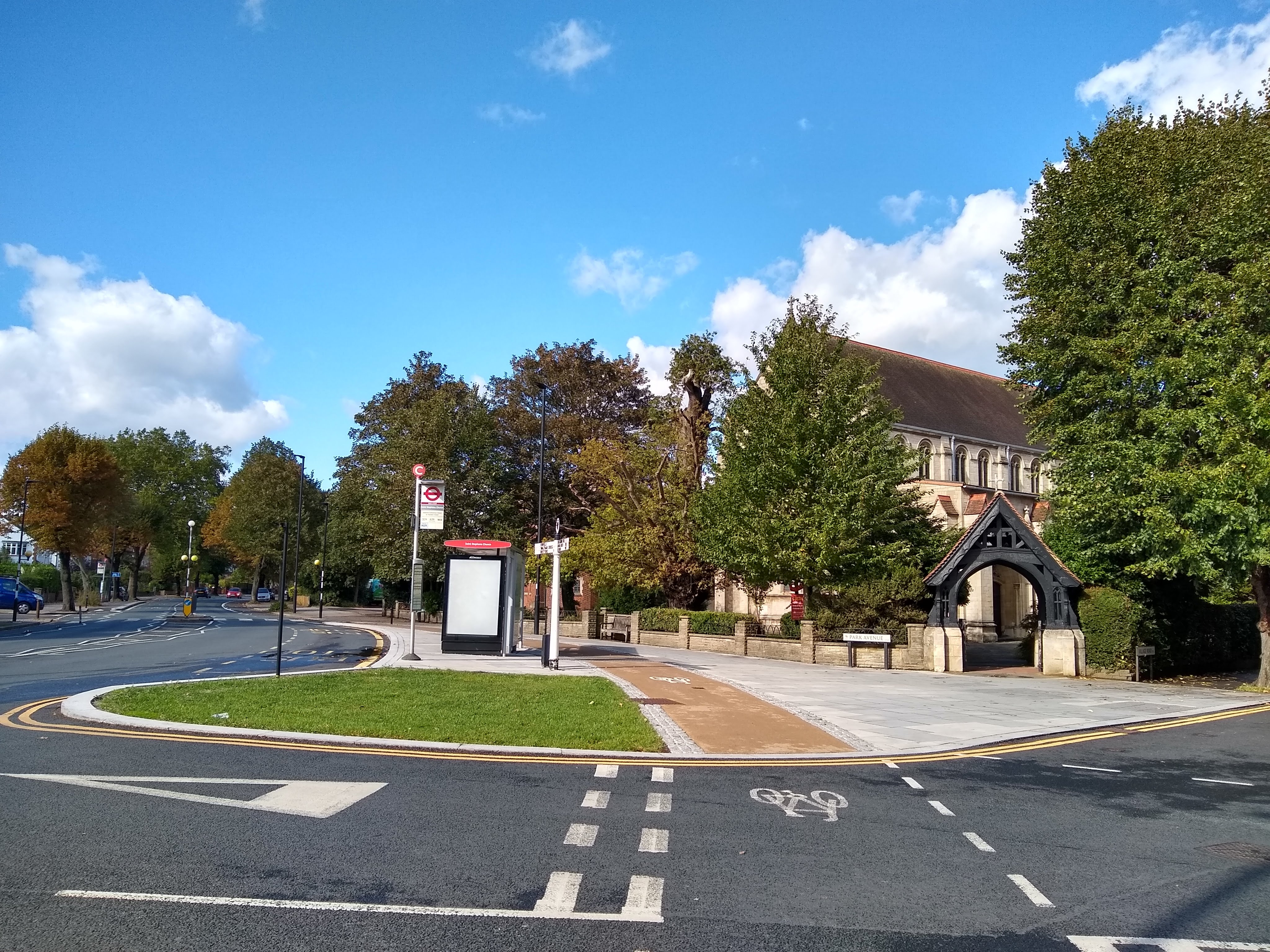
St Stephen's Parish Church, Bush Hill Park; the luchgate seen from Park Avenue

The lychgate was built in 1922, as a war memorial.

== Vicarage ==
The first vicar lived (1901) in a semi-detached house in Village Road. In 1935 a new vicarage was built in Village Road, adjacent to the church, at a cost of £3,500, comprising a dining room, drawing room, study, kitchen, five bedrooms, bathroom and toilet.
