= St. Mary's Church, Potters Bar =

Church building in Hertfordshire, England

Coordinates: 51.6950°N 0.1784°W

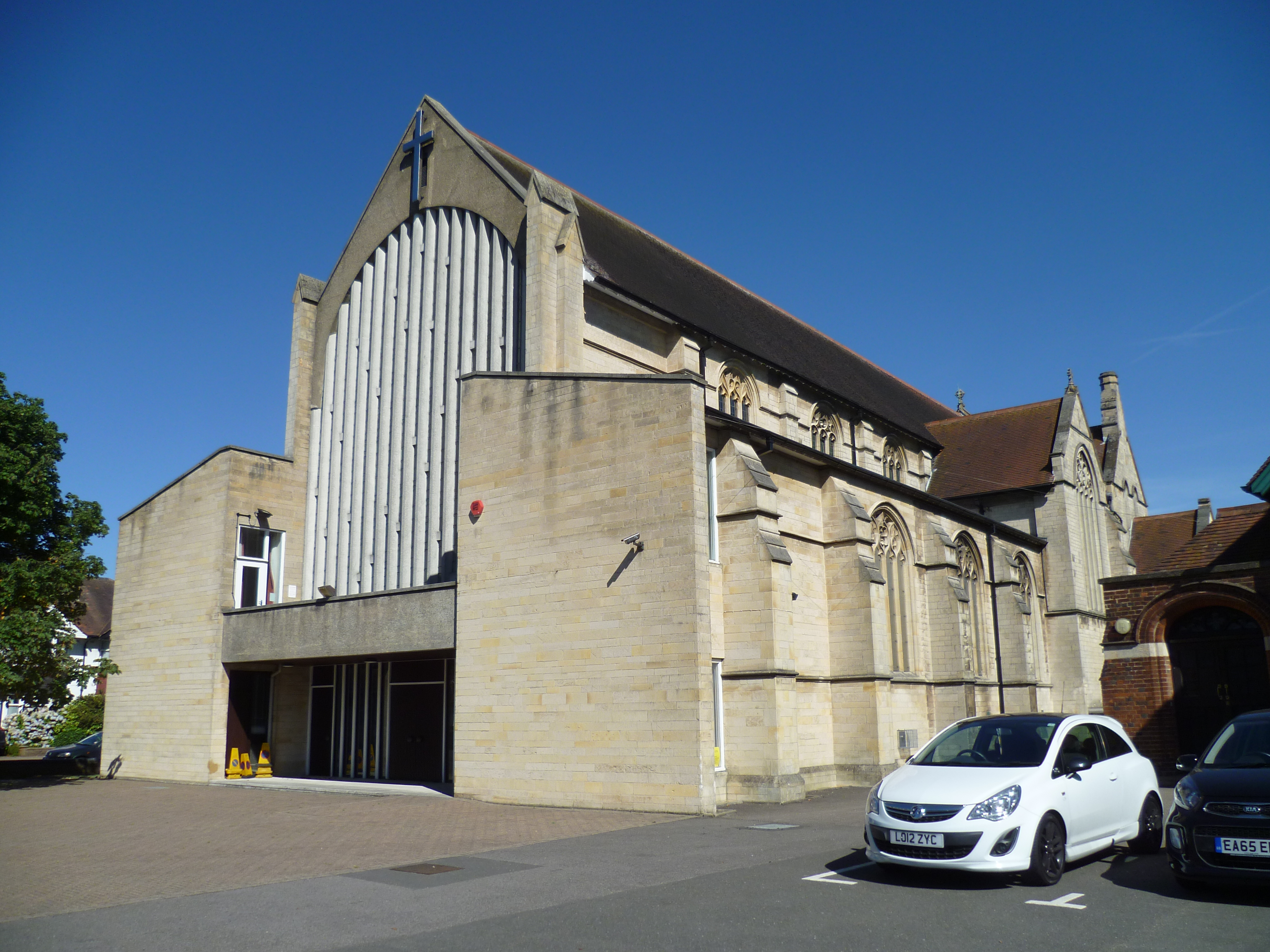
St Mary's Church, west end.

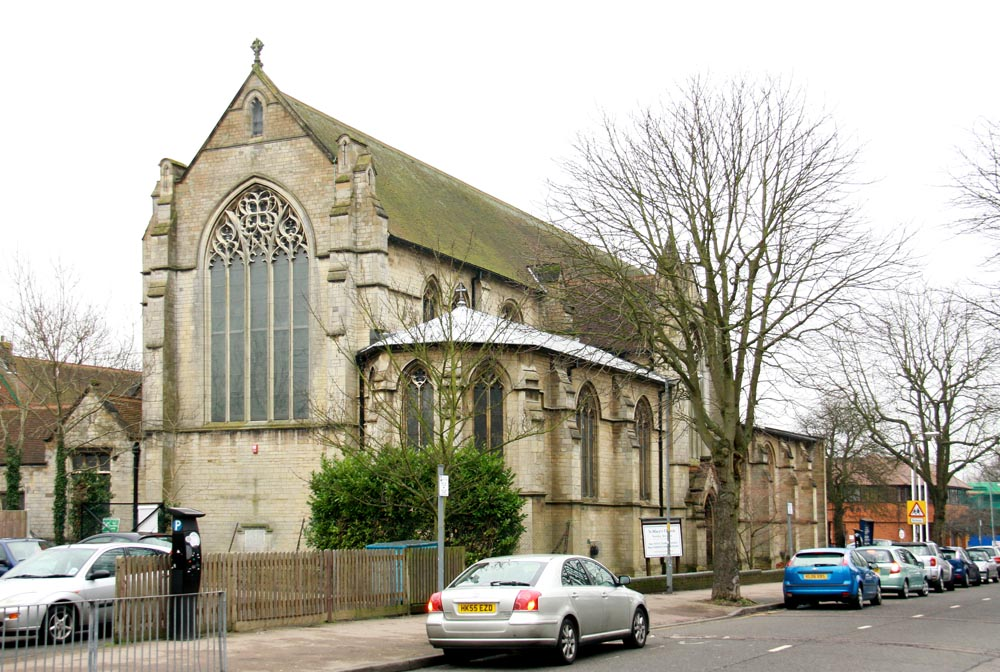
St Mary's Church, east end.

St. Mary's Church is a Church of England church in The Walk, Potters Bar, England. It is in the Diocese of St. Albans. Services are in the Catholic tradition of the Church of England.

The church was designed by J. S. Alder and replaced the dilapidated St John's, which was on the site now occupied by the Potters Bar war memorial. The foundation stone was laid by Princess Marie Louise of Schleswig-Holstein in June 1914 and the church opened one year later.
