= Harleston Sancroft Academy =

Church of England academy in Harleston, Norfolk, England

The Harleston Sancroft Academy

Location
- Wilderness Lane; Harleston, Norfolk, IP20 9DD; England
- Coordinates: 52.3994°N 1.2939°E

Information
- Other name: HSA
- Type: Academy
- Motto: Life in All its Fullness (John 10:10)
- Religious affiliation: Church of England
- Established: 1688; 338 years ago
- Founder: Archbishop William Sancroft
- Local authority: Norfolk
- Trust: St Benet’s Multi Academy Trust
- Department for Education URN: 149197 Tables
- Ofsted: Reports
- Chair of Local Governing Body: Michael Soper
- Head Teacher: Rob Connelly
- Gender: Co-educational
- Age: 3 to 16
- Capacity: 472 Primary 501 Secondary
- Houses: Ormerod, Dove, Sancroft, Pickering
- Previous School Ofsted Grade (before merger): Good
- Website: http://sancroft.stbenets.org/

The Harleston Sancroft Academy is a Church of England all-through school located in Harleston, Norfolk, England. It was formed on 1 September 2022 from Archbishop Sancroft High School and Harleston Primary Academy.

== History ==
The school was first established by Archbishop William Sancroft, who by deed on 25 June 1688 granted £54 a year to Emmanuel College, Cambridge to pay a clergyman to teach in Harleston. Sancroft had to gain permission from the monarch James II to found the school.

The school occupied its current premises in 1964. Since then the school has continued to expand and has in recent years been over-subscribed, with students travelling some distance in Norfolk and Suffolk to be educated at the school.

In 2018, the school became the first secondary school as part of the Diocese of Norwich's St Benet’s Multi Academy Trust.

== Description ==
When Ofsted visited the secondary school in 2013, prior to it becoming an academy, it found a good school. The school is smaller than the average-sized secondary school where a very large majority of the students are from White British backgrounds and all speak English as their first language. The proportion of disabled students and those with special educational needs was below the national average though the proportion of students receiving the pupil premium is similar to the national average.

== Curriculum ==
The school operates a three-year, Key Stage 3 where all the core National Curriculum subjects are taught. Year 7 and Year 8 study core subjects: English, Mathematics, Science. The following foundation subjects are offered: French, German, Geography and History, Computing, Design & Technology, Drama, Life Skills, PSHE & RE, Music, Art and PE.

Every student in Key Stage 4 has the opportunity to study subjects that will give them the greatest possible range of choices in the future. All students will study the English language, English literature, Mathematics, Sciences, and Religious Education – a total of 6 GCSEs that make up the core. In addition to these courses, all students have PE lessons and RSHE - Relationships, Sex and Health Education which are not examined.

In addition to the 6 core qualifications, all students take 3 of: Geography, History, French, Computer Science, German, PE, Music, Catering, Engineering, Art and Design, Drama, or Enrichment. This makes 8 GCSEs, or 9/10 if the pupil is selected to do Triple Science or Further Maths.

== See also ==
- William Sancroft - Archbishop of Canterbury
