= Judge Bennett =

Judge Bennett may refer to:

- Alfred H. Bennett (born 1965), judge of the United States District Court for the Southern District of Texas
- Marion T. Bennett (1914–2000), judge of the United States Court of Appeals for the Federal Circuit
- Mark J. Bennett (born 1953), judge of the United States Court of Appeals for the Ninth Circuit
- Mark W. Bennett (born 1950), judge of the United States District Court for the Northern District of Iowa
- Richard D. Bennett (born 1947), judge of the United States District Court for the District of Maryland
- Richard W. Bennett (born 1974), judge of the United States District Court for the Southern District of Texas

== See also ==
- John Bennet (judge) (1553–1627), British judge of the Prerogative Court of Canterbury
- Hiram Pitt Bennet (1826–1914), judge of the circuit court of Iowa
- Justice Bennett (disambiguation)
