= Lake Bennett =

Lake Bennett may refer to:

- Lake Bennett (Northern Territory), Australia
- Bennett Lake, British Columbia and Yukon, Canada
- Lake Bennett in Faulkner County, Arkansas, U.S.
- Bennett Lake (Minnesota), U.S.

== See also ==
- Bennett (disambiguation)
