= Coleridge Historic District =

Historic district in North Carolina, United States

- U.S. National Register of Historic Places
- U.S. Historic district
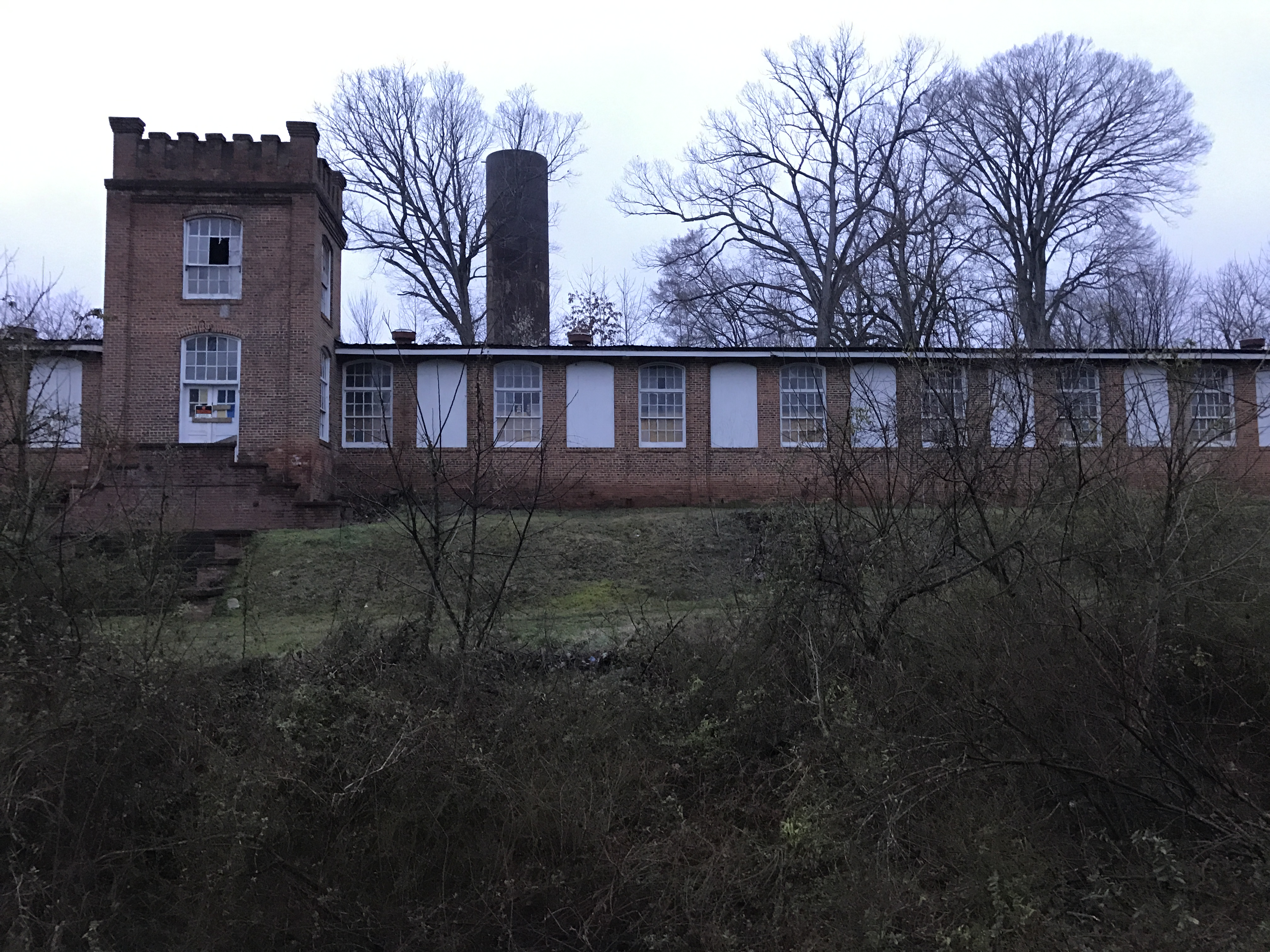
- Enterprise Cotton Mill

- Location within North Carolina Location within the United States
- Location: NC 22, Coleridge, North Carolina
- Coordinates: 35°38′23″N 79°37′00″W
- Area: 45 acres (18 ha)
- Architectural style: Queen Anne, Romanesque
- NRHP reference No.: 76001334
- Added to NRHP: November 13, 1976

Coleridge Historic District is a national historic district located at Coleridge, Randolph County, North Carolina. The district encompasses 17 contributing buildings in the Victorian mill village of Coleridge. It includes buildings built between 1882 and the late 1920s and notable examples of Queen Anne and Romanesque Revival architecture. Notable buildings include the Enterprise Cotton Mill complex, the company store (c. 1910), mill office, Bank of Coleridge, and John Caveness House (c. 1900).

It was added to the National Register of Historic Places in 1976.
