= Benet =

Benet or Benét refers to:

- Benet (surname)
- Benet, Vendée, a place in France
- Benet Academy, in Lisle, Illinois, U.S.
- Benét Laboratories, U.S. Army technology center
- Benet's Reader's Encyclopedia, a 1948 reference work
- Benet, a trade name for the anti-osteoporosis drug Risedronic acid

== See also ==
- Bennet (disambiguation)
- Bennett (disambiguation)
- Benett, a surname
- Bennette, a surname
- St Benet (disambiguation)
