= St Benet Fink =

Former church in London

Coordinates: 51°30′50″N 0°5′10″W

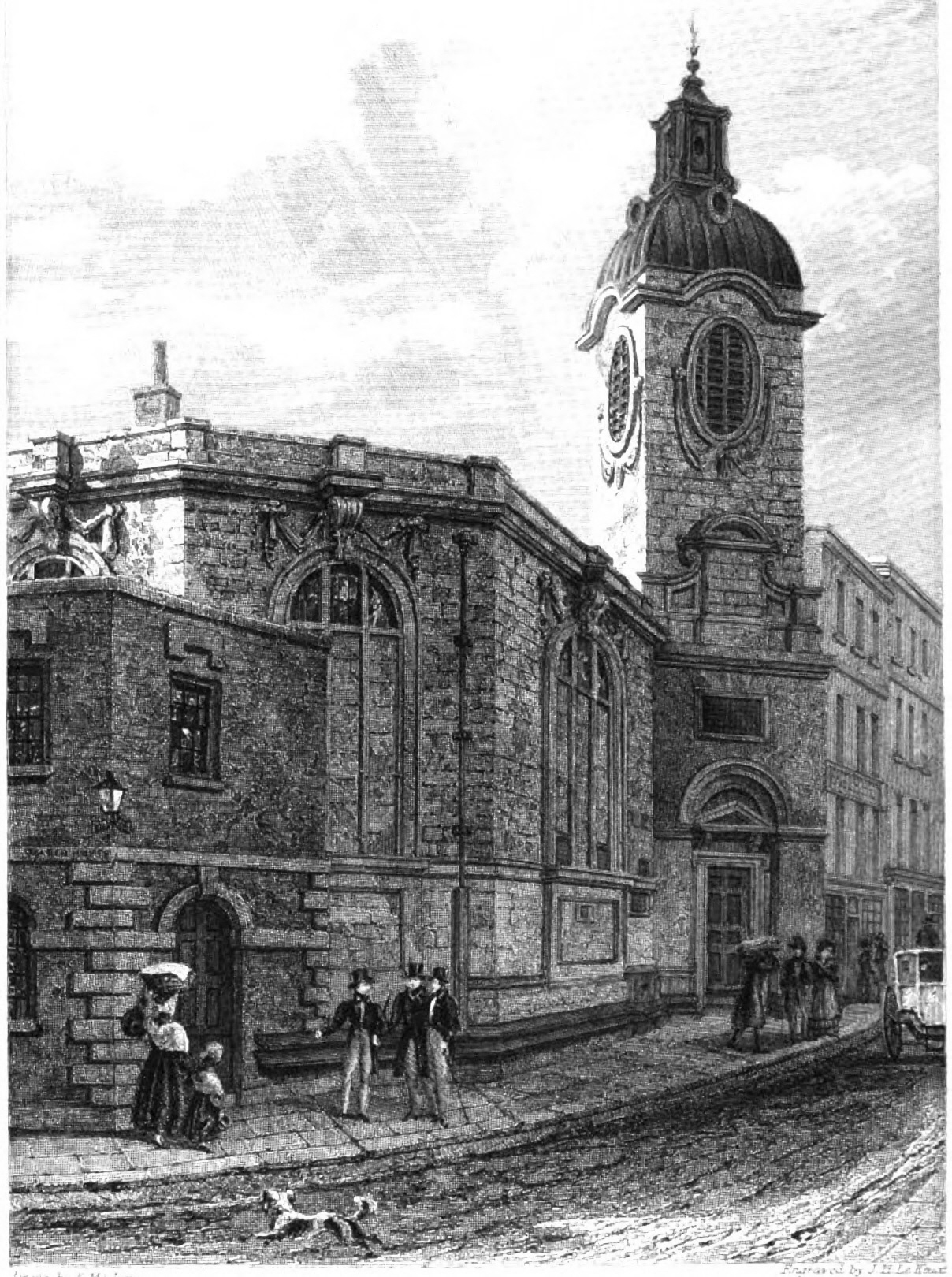
- St Benet Fink
- Location: London
- Country: England
- Denomination: Anglican

Architecture
- Architect: Christopher Wren
- Style: Baroque
- Demolished: 1846

St Benet Fink was a church and parish in the City of London located on what is now Threadneedle Street. Recorded since the 13th century, the church was destroyed in the Great Fire of London of 1666, then rebuilt to the designs of Sir Christopher Wren. The Wren church was demolished between 1841 and 1846.

== History ==
"St Benet" is short for "St Benedict". There were four churches with this dedication in London before the Great Fire of 1666. The earliest surviving reference to the church is in a document of 1216, although the discovery of a 10th-century wheel-headed cross in its former churchyard suggests a Saxon foundation. In the case of St Benet, it is certain that the Benedict referred to Benedict Biscop the 7th-century Anglo-Saxon founder of Jarrow Priory, and St Benedict Fink referred to Benedict of Nursia, the 6th century founder of Western monasticism. "Fink", according to John Stow, is derived from Robert Fink (alias Finch), a 13th-century benefactor who paid to have the church rebuilt. Finch Lane (originally being named as “Fink” or “Finck” Lane), off Threadneedle Street, was named after the same family.

The most significant event in the pre-Fire church was the marriage there, on 10 September 1662, of the Puritan divine Richard Baxter to Margaret Charlton. The wedding ceremony was officiated by a friend of Baxter's, the noted Puritan biographer Mr Samuel Clarke.

St Benet Fink was one of 89 churches destroyed in the Great Fire. Rebuilding began comparatively quickly, in 1670, thanks partly to a donation of £1000 by George Holman, a Roman Catholic. In gratitude, he was given two pews and a place in the vault. Building of the church and steeple was completed in 1675 at a total cost of £4129.

The parish registers record the death of the church warden, Thomas Sharrow, in 1673, from falling in a vault in Paternoster Row and lying there undiscovered for 11 days. The register entry includes the admonition "Let all who read this take heed of drink".

On 9 April 1801, John Henry Newman, the future cardinal, was baptised in St Benet Fink.

In 1838, the Royal Exchange, which had also been rebuilt after the Great Fire, burnt down. In order to improve the site of the Exchange, the Corporation of London petitioned Parliament for permission to demolish the tower of St Benet Fink and appropriate its churchyard, as well as demolish the nearby St Bartholomew-by-the-Exchange. More than twenty City churches were to be demolished over the next century but in 1840 the demolition was enough of a novelty to elicit protests from Edward John Carlos in The Gentleman's Magazine, and from the parish. The Bishop of London, however, supported the Corporation as there were many other churches in the immediate neighbourhood.

The first stage of demolition was carried out in 1842. A new entrance was made in the west wall of the truncated church. This proved unsatisfactory, and the Corporation petitioned Parliament for another Act to demolish the rest of the church. This was granted and the church was knocked down in 1846.

The parish was combined with that of St Peter le Poer and proceeds of the sale of the site were used to build St Benet Fink Church, Tottenham. Sale of the furnishings realised only £15 5s.

The paintings of Moses and Aaron that formed part of the altarpiece are now in the chapel of Emanuel School, Battersea.

Today, the site is occupied by No.1 Threadneedle Street, an 8-storey office block completed in 1991.

== Architecture ==
The pre-Fire church was rectangular. After the Fire, the City appropriated the northwest corner of the church for widening Threadneedle Street. This left an irregular site on which to build, which Wren dealt with by rebuilding St Benet's to a decagonal plan. On top of the decagon sat an oval dome with a lantern, supported from within by six arches. The church had two aisles being spanned by entablatures supporting barrel vaults.

It is possible that the decagonal design employed by Wren was borrowed from Bernini's Sant'Andrea al Quirinale in Rome. Wren had studied Bernini's drawings when he met him in Paris in 1665.

The walls were made from brick and rubble, faced with Portland stone, although the church was built around by houses for much of its history.

The tower was attached to the west end of the decagonal body of the church. It had a square dome surmounted by a bell cage, and, uniquely for a Wren church, a ball and cross, instead of a vane. The tower, including the steeple, was 110 ft. high.

The backs of houses constructed in Sweetings Rents – a lane demolished in the rebuilding of the Royal Exchange - were partly built over the churchyard, and these were supported by pillars, forming a colonnade.

== See also ==
- List of Christopher Wren churches in London
- List of churches rebuilt after the Great Fire but since demolished
- St. Anthony's Hospital, St Benet Fink
- 17th-century Western domes
