= Bennett Creek =

Bennett Creek may refer to:

- Bennett Creek (Missouri), a stream in Missouri
- Bennett Creek (Nansemond River tributary), a stream in Virginia
- Bennett Creek (New Mexico), a stream in New Mexico

== See also ==
- Bennetts River, Arkansas and Missouri
