= Edward John Carlos =

English writer (1798–1851)

Edward John Carlos (12 February 1798 – 20 January 1851) was an English writer on architecture, and the author of many articles for The Gentleman's Magazine.

== Life ==
Carlos was born 12 February 1798, the son of William Carlos and his wife Grace, of Newington, Surrey. He was descended from Colonel William Careless or Carlis who helped save the life of Charles II after the Battle of Worcester and later changed his name to "Carlos" at the King's wish.

He was educated at Mr Colecraft's school in Newington. He was then articled to G. T. R. Reynal of the Lord Mayor's Court Office, and became a barrister, while continuing to manage Reynal's business. He had by this time developed an interest in architecture, especially church architecture. He gathered a large collection of prints, drawings and notes on architectural subjects, and was one of the first people to make a collection of brass rubbings.

He wrote on architecture for the Gentleman's Magazine, including, between 1824 and 1832, a series of articles on the new churches then being built in and around London. The magazine's obituary said that "in days of less taste than the present, he traced the footsteps of innovation or inconsistency with a fearless and unsparing hand". He also reviewed books on architecture, and architectural designs exhibited at the Royal Academy, continuing to write for the magazine until 1848. His articles were signed with the initials "E.I.C.".

In 1832 he was on the committee for the restoration of Crosby Hall, and he campaigned for the preservation of the church of St Mary Overy, Southwark (now Southwark Cathedral), publishing Historical and Antiquarian Notices of Crosby Hall and Some Account of the Chapel of Our Lady, in the Priory Church of St Mary Overy, Southwark (both 1832). He took a special interest in Old London Bridge, which he wished to see preserved, and published, jointly with the assistant architect to the bridge, an account of it "with observations on its architecture, during its demolition". In 1843, he made a revised edition of Joseph Skelton's Oxonia Restaurata.

In 1848 he suffered what his obituary called "a total paralysis of the brain, which totally incapacitated him from mental or bodily labour". He died at York Place, Walworth on 20 January 1851.

A collection of his notes on churches, pasted into five volumes, was purchased by the Guildhall Library in 1993, and is now held by the London Metropolitan Archives.
