= St Benet Fink Church, Tottenham =

Church in London

St Benet Fink
- Parish Church of St Benet Fink
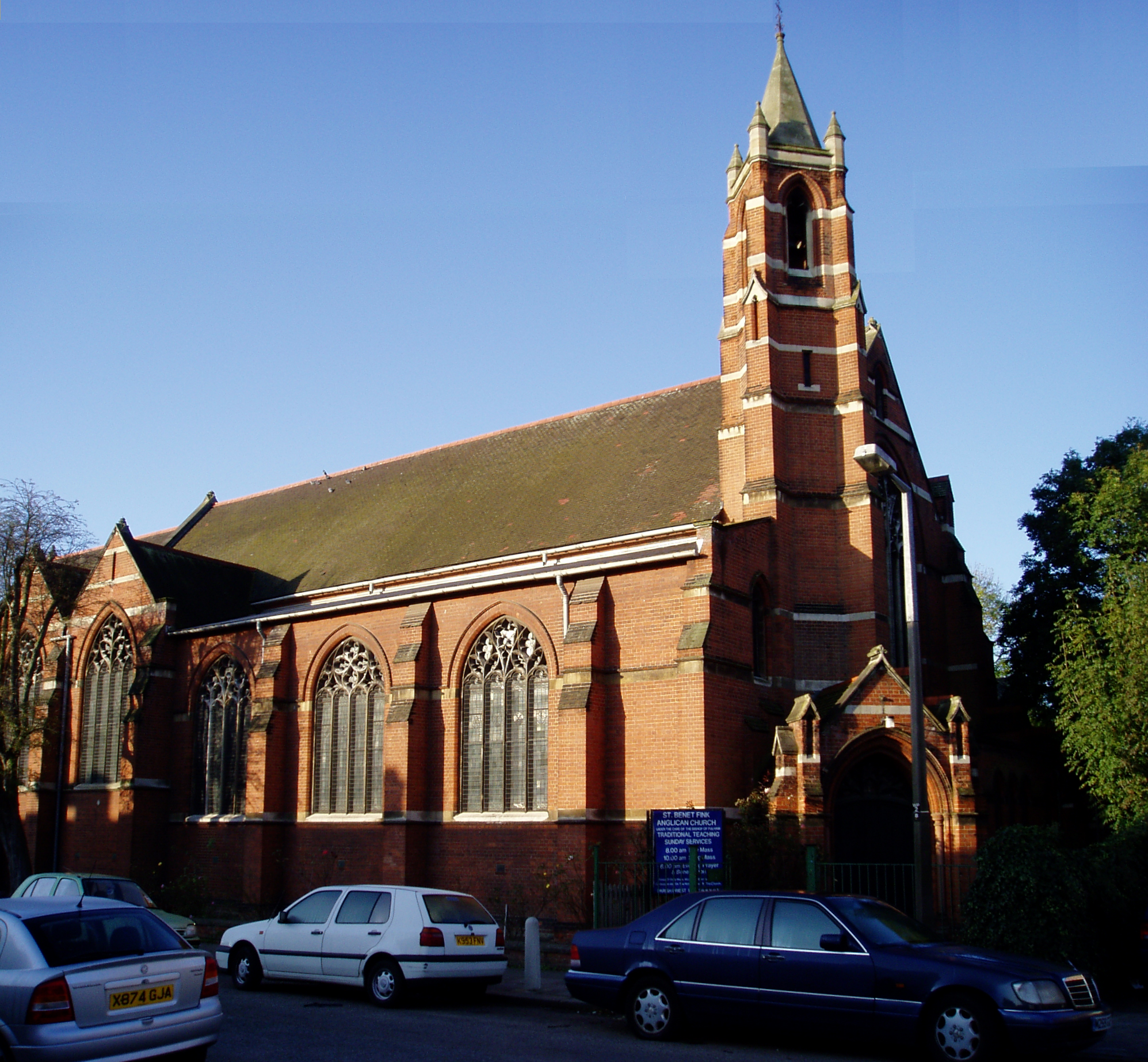

- Location within Greater London
- 51.5973744°N 0.0910583°W
- Country: United Kingdom
- Denomination: Church of England
- Churchmanship: Traditional Catholic
- Website: www.stbenetfink.org.uk

History
- Status: Church
- Founded: June 3, 1911 - but see note below
- Dedication: Saint Benedict
- Consecrated: 1912-05-15

Architecture
- Functional status: Active
- Architectural type: Mini-Cathedral
- Groundbreaking: 1911-06-03

Specifications
- Length: 41 metres (135 ft)
- Width: 18 metres (59 ft)
- Materials: Red brick walls, slate roof.

Administration
- Province: Canterbury
- Diocese: London
- Archdeaconry: Hampstead
- Deanery: Haringey
- Parish: St. Benet Fink, Tottenham

Clergy
- Bishop: Rt Revd Jonathan Baker (AEO)
- Vicar: Fr James Hill SSC

St Benet Fink, Tottenham, is an Anglican church in Tottenham, London.

== History ==
=== Early history ===
The original St Benet Fink church was in Threadneedle Street in the City of London and is first mentioned in 1216. At an unknown prior date a Saint Benedict's Church had been rebuilt with a gift from one Robert Finke.

=== Name ===
Benet is short for Benedict from Saint Benedict. Historically, if there was more than one church in an area dedicated to a particular Saint then the benefactor's name was added to the church's name, hence Benet Fink.

=== 20th century ===
In 1904, a mission to this district was established and a tin tabernacle opened in Granger Road in 1905, dedicated to St Luke, while funds were raised to build a permanent building. The current church was built during 1911 and 1912, and at its consecration on 15 May 1912, the Bishop of London referred to it as "the little Cathedral"; given its light and airy interior, reminiscent of Gothic cathedral architecture, it is easy to see why. The architect was J. S. Alder, and St Benet's is said to be his most complete and unaltered church. The spire houses a single bell, as was common architectural practice at the beginning of the last century; the building has a Grade II listing. The symbols in the windows are the symbols of the saints and martyrs of Christian antiquity.

== Architecture ==
The church is of red brick with a slate roof and has a small spire that accommodates a single bell. It is the style that was common in north London at the beginning of the twentieth century. The site includes a matching vicarage and church hall.

== Incumbents ==
	Vicar
1912-1917	Fr Harold Van Cooten
1917-1927	Fr Marcus Donavon
1927-1962	Fr Charles Waton
1962-1969	Fr William Stephenson
1969-2009	Fr Michael Davenport
	Priest in Charge
2010-2011	Fr Mark Elliott Smith
2011-2016	Fr James Hill
	Vicar
2016	Fr James Hill

Reference:.
