= St Benet's Multi Academy Trust =

Multi-academy trust in Norwich

The Diocese of Norwich St Benet's Multi-Academy Trust
- Founded: 25 June 2020
- Type: multi-academy trust
- Registration no.: 11276240
- Location: Diocesan House, 109 Dereham Road, Easton, Norwich, NR5 9ES
- Website: www.stbenets.org

The Diocese of Norwich St Benet's Multi-Academy Trust is a multi-academy trust, serving schools in the Diocese of Norwich, in Norfolk and the Waveney Valley. These are predominantly former Church of England village primary schools.

== Primary academies ==
- Diss Church of England Junior Academy
- Dickleburgh Church of England Primary Academy
- Diss Infant Academy and Nursery

== All-through academies ==
- Harleston Sancroft Academy, Harleston, Norfolk
