= Bennet =

Bennet may refer to:

== Arts, entertainment and media ==
- Bennet (band), a 1990s British band
- Bennet and the Band, an Indian backing band
- Bennet–Veetraag, an Indian music director duo
- Bennet family, fictional characters from Pride and Prejudice
- Noah Bennet, a fictional character from TV drama Heroes

== Other uses ==
- Bennet (surname), including a list of people with the name
- Bennet, Nebraska, a place in the U.S.
- Bennet (supermarket), in Italy
- Geum urbanum, or herb Bennet, a perennial plant

== See also ==
- Benet (disambiguation)
- Bennett (disambiguation)
- Benett, a surname
