= Bennett High School =

Bennett High School may refer to:

- Bennett High School (Buffalo, New York)
- Bennett High School (Bennett, Colorado)
- James M. Bennett High School, Salisbury, Maryland
