= Bennett, Alberta =

Coordinates: 50.9588889°N 113.796666°W

Bennett is a locality in Alberta, Canada.

Bennett has the name of R. B. Bennett, a railroad official.
