= Justice Bennett =

Justice Bennett may refer to:

- Alfred S. Bennett (1854–1925), associate justice of the Oregon Supreme Court
- Annabelle Bennett (born 1950), additional judge of the Supreme Court of the Australian Capital Territory
- Charles Alan Bennett (1877–1943), judge at the Chancery Division of the High Court
- Elizabeth Bennett (judge) (fl. 1990s–2000s), justice of the Supreme Court of British Columbia
- Granville G. Bennett (1833–1910), associate justice of the Supreme Court for the Dakota Territory
- John E. Bennett (judge) (1833–1893), associate justice of the Arkansas Supreme Court, and later of the South Dakota Supreme Court
- Milo Lyman Bennett (1789–1868), associate justice of the Vermont Supreme Court
- Nathaniel Bennett (1818–1886), associate justice of the California Supreme Court

== See also ==
- Job Bennet Jr. (fl. 1750s–1760s), associate justice of the Rhode Island Supreme Court
- Judge Bennett (disambiguation)
