= Bennett, Missouri =

Extinct town in the American state of Missouri

Coordinates: 36°44′01″N 91°00′16″W

Bennett is an extinct town in western Ripley County, in the U.S. state of Missouri. The GNIS classifies it as a populated place. The community is located on the North Fork Buffalo Creek in the Mark Twain National Forest.

A post office called Bennett was established in 1878, and remained in operation until 1955. The community has the name of William Bennett, who was credited with securing the town a post office.
