= Bennett Township =

Bennett Township may refer to:

- Bennett Township, Kingman County, Kansas
- Bennett Township, Fillmore County, Nebraska
