= Bennett, North Carolina =

Human settlement in North Carolina, USA

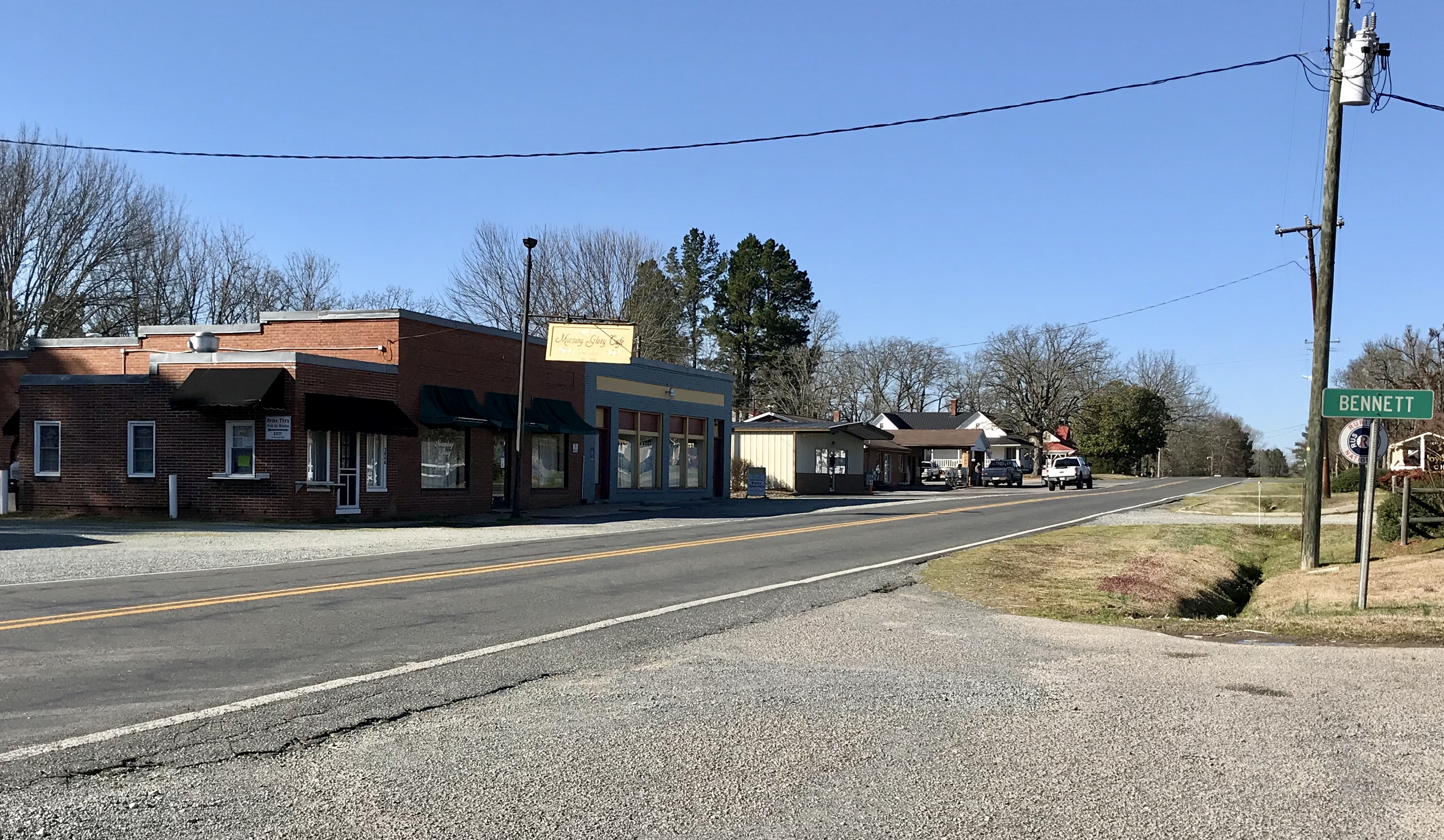
Bennett, North Carolina

Bennett is a census-designated place in Chatham County, North Carolina, United States. As of the 2020 census, Bennett had a population of 284.

== Geography ==
Bennett is located near the southwestern corner of Chatham County and is bordered on its western side by Randolph County. North Carolina Highways 22 and 42 run concurrently just southwest of the center of the town. NC 22 leads north 14 miles (23 km) to Ramseur and south 18 miles (29 km) to Carthage, while NC 42 leads northwest 22 miles (35 km) to Asheboro and east 24 miles (39 km) to Sanford. NC 902 meets the two highways just south of Bennett and leads northeast 25 miles (40 km) to Pittsboro, the Chatham County seat.

== History ==
Founded as "Boaz" in 1888, the area was inhabited by the Scott, Kidd, Powers, Sizemore and Heck families, until the Bonlee & Western Railroad reached the area in 1910. The name changed to "Bennett" in 1910, after Atlantic & Yadkin Railroad Superintendent J.M. Bennett. Bennett was incorporated in 1915, with H.A. Denson, a physician, being the first mayor. The new town was to be a city and was built with 80-foot-wide (24 m) streets and 10-foot (3 m) alleys laid out in a grid. At one time it had a hotel, a ladies emporium, a small mall owned by D.R. Smith, a jewelry store and chocolate shop combination, a millinery shop, and several grocery stores. A small house was converted into a silent movie theater, and they had an auditorium for local plays called the "Arbor".

The bank was robbed in 1927 by Bill Payne and Wash Turner. They were not caught after the robbery, but much later (after a life of crime) they were convicted out in the western states. The town was home to Bennett Christian Church and Bennett Baptist Church; however, only the latter still stands. The train made its last run in 1928, before the Great Depression shrank the town.

== Today ==
Bennett has a hardware store, a fire station, Baxter's Garage and Brady's Grill, a post office, Routh's small grocery, The Ram Food Mart, the Tri-County Ruritans and Bennett School (K-8). It is the site of the annual "Flatwoods Festival" every fall and hosts an annual Christmas parade.

== Phone service ==
Bennett is located in Area code 336 instead of Area code 919 like the rest of Chatham County. The community is in the 336 area code because of its proximity to Randolph County (which is entirely in the 336 district) and because phone service is provided by a company based in Randolph County.

== Points of interest ==
- The Devil's Tramping Ground is located a few miles north of Bennett in the Harper's Crossroads community.
- The Southern Supreme Fruitcake factory is located just outside Bennett off Highway 902.
- The Soapstone Quarry is a few miles south of Bennett in Moore County.
- Historic Mt. Vernon Springs is just a few miles north on Mt. Vernon Springs Road.
- Colonel John Randolph Lane lived just north of Bennett on Little Brush Creek.
