= Randolph High School =

Randolph High School may refer to:

- Randolph High School (Massachusetts), Randolph, Massachusetts
- Randolph High School (Nebraska), Randolph, Nebraska
- Randolph High School (New Jersey), Randolph, New Jersey
- Randolph High School (New York), Randolph, New York
- Randolph High School (Texas), Universal City, Texas
- Randolph High School (Wisconsin), Randolph, Wisconsin

== See also ==
=== Alabama ===
- Randolph School, Huntsville, Alabama
- Randolph County High School, public middle and high school in Wedowee, Alabama

=== North Carolina ===
- Eastern Randolph High School, Ramseur, North Carolina
- Southwestern Randolph High School, Asheboro, North Carolina

=== Other ===
- Randolph Secondary School, Randolph, Minnesota
- The Randolph School, Wappingers Falls, New York
