= Randolph County Schools =

Randolph County Schools or Randolph County School System can refer to:

- Randolph County School District (Alabama)
- Randolph County School District (Arkansas)
- Randolph County School District (Georgia)
- Randolph County Schools (North Carolina)
- Randolph County Schools (West Virginia)
