= Josh King (basketball) =

American basketball coach

South East Melbourne Phoenix
- Title: Head coach
- League: NBL

Personal information
- Born: August 24, 1985 (age 41) Hammond, Indiana, U.S.
- Listed height: 5 ft 10 in (1.78 m)
- Listed weight: 170 lb (77 kg)

Career information
- High school: Trinity (Trinity, North Carolina)
- College: East Carolina (2004–2006); Eckerd (2006–2008)
- Position: Guard
- Coaching career: 2008–present

Career history

Coaching
- 2008–2009: Vassar College (assistant)
- 2009–2010: UMass Lowell (assistant)
- 2010–2014: Marshall (assistant)
- 2016–2018: New Hampshire (assistant)
- 2018–2021: Riesen Ludwigsburg (assistant)
- 2021–2022: USK Praha
- 2022–2024: Riesen Ludwigsburg
- 2024: Darüşşafaka
- 2024–present: South East Melbourne Phoenix
- 2025: Mets de Guaynabo

Josh King (born August 24, 1985) is an American professional basketball coach who is the head coach of the South East Melbourne Phoenix of the Australian National Basketball League (NBL). After playing college basketball for East Carolina and Eckerd, King immediately moved into coaching and served as an assistant coach in the college system between 2008 and 2018. In 2018, he moved overseas for the first time, spending three seasons as an assistant with Riesen Ludwigsburg in Germany. His first head coach position came in 2021 with Czech club USK Praha before returning to Riesen Ludwigsburg as head coach in 2022. After two seasons with Ludwigsburg, he had a brief stint with Darüşşafaka in Turkey before joining the South East Melbourne Phoenix in Australia in October 2024.

== High school career ==
King was born in Hammond, Indiana. He played high school basketball at Trinity High School in Trinity, North Carolina. As a senior in 2003–04, King averaged 27.1 points per game and led his team to the state 3A championship. He earned North Carolina AP Player of the Year honors and was named the NCHSAA 3A Player of Year. He set a state high school single-season record for three-point field goals made (164) and set a state high school single-game record for three-point field goals made (12). His 416 career three-pointers saw him finish as the state's all-time leader in career three-point field goals, surpassing the former mark of 275.

== College career ==
King played two seasons of NCAA Division I college basketball for the East Carolina Pirates between 2004 and 2006. He played 45 games with two starts, averaging 2.6 points in 10.5 minutes per game.

After being informed that his scholarship would not be renewed, King transferred to Eckerd College of the NCAA Division II in May 2006. He was the co-captain of the Tritons during his senior campaign, starting all 28 games. The team made the NCAA Division II tournament both of King's seasons, reaching the Sweet 16 during the 2006–07 season.

King graduated from Eckerd in 2008 with a B.A. in business.

== Coaching career ==
After graduating from Eckerd, King spent the 2008–09 season as the assistant men's basketball coach at Vassar College. He then joined the UMass Lowell River Hawks coaching staff for the 2009–10 season.

Between 2010 and 2012, King served as a graduate assistant with the Marshall Thundering Herd men's basketball team. As a graduate assistant, King assisted the coaching staff with day-to-day operations while earning a master's degree in adult technical education. He was elevated to an assistant coach in July 2012. After two seasons as an assistant with Marshall, he left to serve as director of the Hoop Group Elite from 2014 to 2015.

In August 2016, King joined the New Hampshire Wildcats men's basketball team as an assistant coach.

In August 2018, King joined Riesen Ludwigsburg in Germany as an assistant coach under head coach John Patrick. He served in the role for three seasons.

In July 2021, King was named head coach of Czech club USK Praha. His team reached the quarter-finals of the play-offs in the 2021–22 season.

In June 2022, King returned to Riesen Ludwigsburg as the newly appointed head coach. His team reached the semi-finals in the 2022–23 season and the quarter-finals in the 2023–24 season.

In May 2024, King parted ways with Ludwigsburg and joined Darüşşafaka in Turkey as head coach. He coached two games for Darüşşafaka to start the 2024–25 Turkish League season before parting ways in a mutual agreement after he accepted a new coaching role in Australia.

On October 22, 2024, King was appointed head coach of the South East Melbourne Phoenix of the Australian National Basketball League (NBL) for two seasons. He joined the team midway through the 2024–25 NBL season after they started the season with a 0–5 record. In his first game as coach on November 1, the Phoenix defeated the Tasmania JackJumpers 79–77. He went on to guide the Phoenix to fourth place on the ladder with a 16–13 record. He subsequently finished runner-up for NBL Coach of the Year. In the semi-finals, the Phoenix lost 2–1 to the Illawarra Hawks.

On May 9, 2025, King was appointed head coach of Mets de Guaynabo of the Baloncesto Superior Nacional for the rest of the 2025 season, replacing J. J. Barea.

In the 2025–26 NBL season, King helped the Phoenix become a contender and by early February 2026 was considered a leading candidate for the Coach of the Year award. He went on to finish as runner-up for NBL Coach of the Year for the second straight season.

On July 24, 2026, King signed a new three-year contract extension with the Phoenix, securing him with the club until at least the end of the 2028–29 season. The Phoenix started the 2026–27 season with two wins from seven games.

== Personal life ==
King is the son of Terry and Michelle King, and he has one younger sister, Anna, and two younger brothers, Ben and Chris.

King's wife, Sihem, is German with Tunisian heritage. They met while King was coaching in Germany with Riesen Ludwigsburg. Their daughter was born in Istanbul in 2024.
