= Jordan Terrell =

American football player (born 2000)

Profile
- Position: Running back

Personal information
- Born: July 21, 2000 (age 26)
- Listed height: 5 ft 10 in (1.78 m)
- Listed weight: 215 lb (98 kg)

Career information
- High school: Eastern Randolph (Ramseur, North Carolina)
- College: Barton (2019–2023)
- NFL draft: 2024: undrafted

Career history
- BC Lions (2024–2025)
- Stats at CFL.ca

Jordan Terrell (born July 21, 2000) is an American professional football running back who is currently a free agent. He played college football at Barton.

== Early life ==
Jordan Terrell was born on July 21, 2000. He began his high school football career at Lee County High School in Sanford, North Carolina. In 2018, he transferred to play his final season at Eastern Randolph High School in Ramseur, North Carolina. Terrell also participated in track and field in high school.

== College career ==
In 2020, Barton College revived their college football program which had last played in 1950. In preparation for the 2020 season, Terrell and the entire team redshirted the 2019 season. They only practiced that year and did not play any games. Terrell then played for the revived Barton Bulldogs from 2020 to 2023. He played in four games during the COVID-19 shortened 2020 Division II football season, rushing 72 times for 280 yards and three touchdowns while also catching 11 passes for 73 yards and one touchdown.

In his last college game, Terrell rushed for a school and South Atlantic Conference record 403 yards. He finished his college career with totals of 37 games played, 969 carries for 5,487 yards and 44 touchdowns, and 39 receptions for 320 yards and two touchdowns. He graduated with a degree in social work. Despite having a year of eligibility remaining due to the COVID-19 pandemic, Terrell decided to turn professional.

== Professional career ==
On April 28, 2024, after having gone undrafted in the 2024 NFL draft, Terrell was invited to the Tennessee Titans' rookie minicamp on a tryout basis, however he was ultimately not signed by team.

On May 16, 2024, Terrell signed with the BC Lions of the Canadian Football League (CFL). On June 2, 2024, Terrell was assigned to the Lions' practice squad. He rejoined the active roster on September 12, 2024. On October 11, Terrell was reassigned to the Lions' practice squad where spent the remainder of the 2024 CFL season. Terrell dressed in three games that year, rushing four times for 24 yards while also catching one pass for a 24-yard touchdown. On November 29, 2024, Terrell re-signed with the Lions. On June 1, 2025, Terrell was released by the Lions.

On June 9, 2025, Terrell was re-signed by the Lions and rejoined their practice squad, where he spent the entirety of the 2025 CFL season, before being released on November 9, 2025.
