= Andy Headen =

American football player (born 1960)

No. 54
- Position: Linebacker

Personal information
- Born: July 8, 1960 (age 66); Liberty, North Carolina, U.S.
- Listed height: 6 ft 5 in (1.96 m)
- Listed weight: 240 lb (109 kg)

Career information
- High school: Eastern Randolph (Ramseur, North Carolina)
- College: Clemson
- NFL draft: 1983: 8th round, 205th overall pick

Career history
- New York Giants (1983–1988)

Awards and highlights
- Super Bowl champion (XXI); National champion (1981); First-team All-ACC (1982)

Career NFL statistics
- Sacks: 19.5
- Interceptions: 6
- Touchdowns: 1
- Stats at Pro Football Reference

Andrew Roosevelt Headen (born July 8, 1960) is an American former professional football player who was a linebacker for six seasons with the New York Giants of the National Football League (NFL). He played college football for the Clemson Tigers, helping them win the 1981 national championship game. He was selected in the eighth round with the 205th overall pick in the 1983 NFL Draft.
