= Wheatmore High School =

American public school in North Carolina

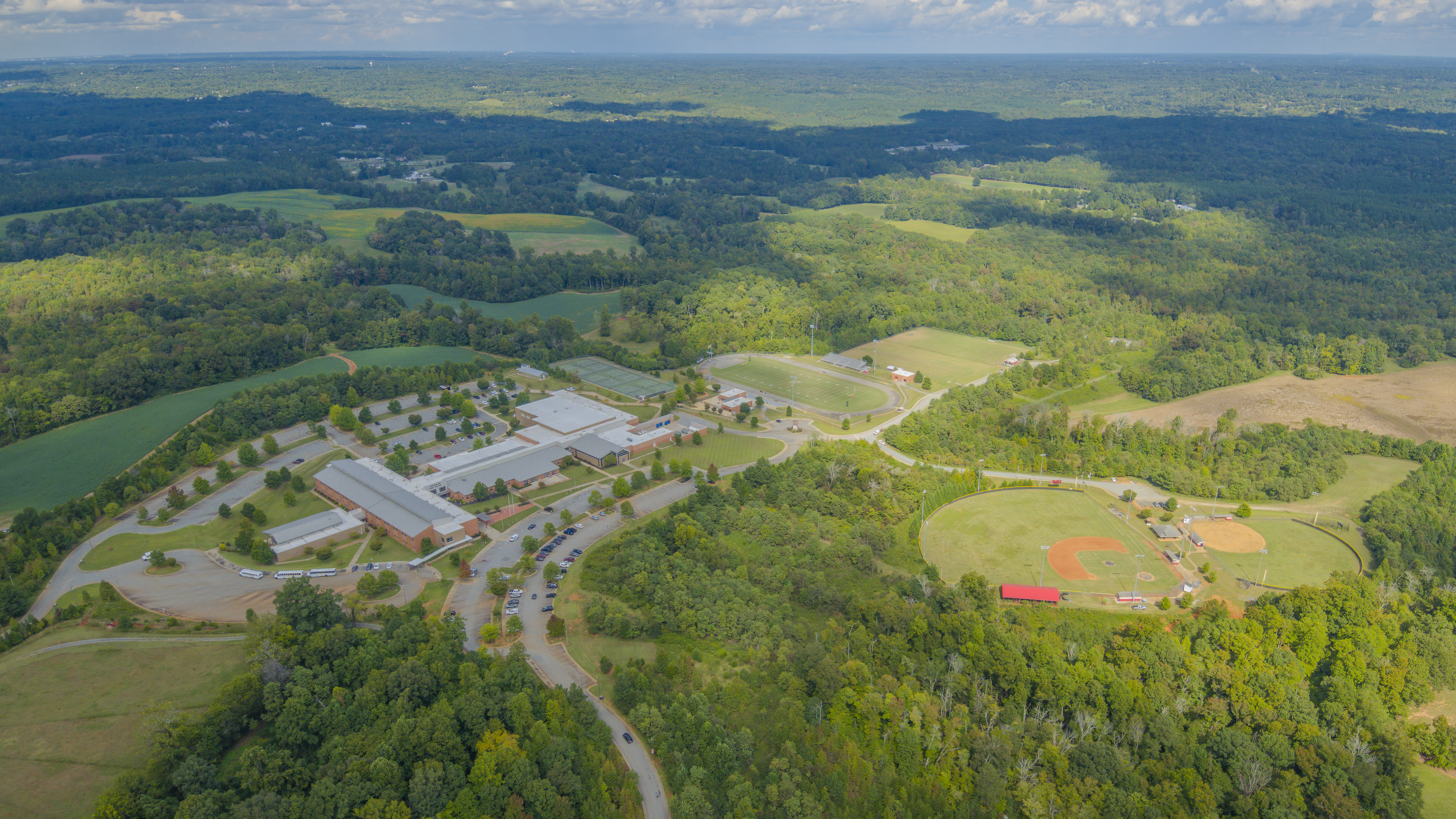
- Wheatmore High School

Location
- 3678 Finch Farm Rd; Trinity, North Carolina 27370; United States; 35°49′45″N 80°00′27″W

Information
- Type: Public
- Motto: Honor. Pride. Valor.
- Established: 2009 (17 years ago)
- School district: Randolph County School System
- Oversight: Randolph County Schools
- CEEB code: 344004
- Principal: Matt Smith
- Faculty: 72
- Teaching staff: 39.76 (FTE)
- Grades: 9–12
- Enrollment: 677 (2022–23)
- Student to teacher ratio: 17.03
- Campus type: Rural
- Colors: Red, White
- Athletics: 2A PAC-7
- Team name: Warriors
- Rival: Trinity High School
- Website: whs.randolph.k12.nc.us

Wheatmore High School is a public high school in Trinity, North Carolina. Wheatmore was originally built to help with an overflow of students from Trinity High School. Wheatmore High opened for the 2009–2010 school year.

== History ==
Wheatmore opened in the 2009–2010 school year, to help with the overflow of students from nearby Trinity High School. At the beginning of the school year in 2009–2010, the Wheatmore school building was not yet ready, so students had to briefly go to school at Trinity, operating as a school within a school.

== Notable alumni ==
- Thad Moffitt — stock car racing driver
