= Ramseur =

Ramseur can refer to:

- Stephen Dodson Ramseur, one of the youngest Confederate generals in the American Civil War
- Ramseur, North Carolina
