= Antonio Goss =

American football player and coach (born 1966)

Carson–Newman Eagles
- Title: Co-defensive coordinator & cornerbacks coach

Personal information
- Born: August 11, 1966 (age 60); Randleman, North Carolina, U.S.
- Listed height: 6 ft 4 in (1.93 m)
- Listed weight: 228 lb (103 kg)

Career information
- High school: Randleman
- College: North Carolina
- NFL draft: 1989: 12th round, 319th overall pick

Career history

Playing
- San Francisco 49ers (1989); San Diego Chargers (1990); San Francisco 49ers (1991–1995); St. Louis Rams (1996)

Coaching
- East Chapel Hill HS (NC) (1998–1999) Linebackers coach; North Carolina Central (2000) Special teams coordinator & linebackers coach; Buffalo (2001–2005) Special teams coordinator, defensive backs coach, & linebackers coach; Middle Tennessee (2006–2008) Special teams coordinator & defensive backs coach; Louisville (2009) Special teams coordinator & defensive backs coach; Furman (2011–2014) Special teams coordinator & defensive backs coach; East Tennessee State (2015–2017) Special teams coordinator & defensive backs coach; Carson–Newman (2018–2025) Special teams coordinator & cornerbacks coach; Carson–Newman (2026–present) Co-defensive coordinator & cornerbacks coach

Awards and highlights
- Super Bowl champion (XXIV, XXIX)

Career NFL statistics
- Tackles: 56
- Fumble recoveries: 1
- Sacks: 1
- Stats at Pro Football Reference

Antonio Derrell Goss (born August 11, 1966) is an American college football coach and former player. He is the co-defensive coordinator and cornerbacks coach for Carson–Newman University, positions he has held since 2026. Goss played professionally as a linebacker in the National Football League (NFL) for seven seasons with the San Francisco 49ers and St. Louis Rams. He was selected 319th overall by the 49ers in the 12th round of the 1989 NFL draft. He won two Super Bowl rings with the 49ers and captain alongside Jerry Rice and Tim McDonald in Super Bowl XXIX.

Goss was a standout in high school sports, lettering in football, basketball, track, and baseball. His athleticism earned him All-American honors in football during his senior year. Goss was key member of Randleman's 2A state championship teams in 1981, 1982, and 1983 and was named captain of his football team his senior year. He was inducted into the Randleman High School Sports Hall Fame in 2013.
