= Deep River-Columbia Manufacturing Company =

- U.S. National Register of Historic Places
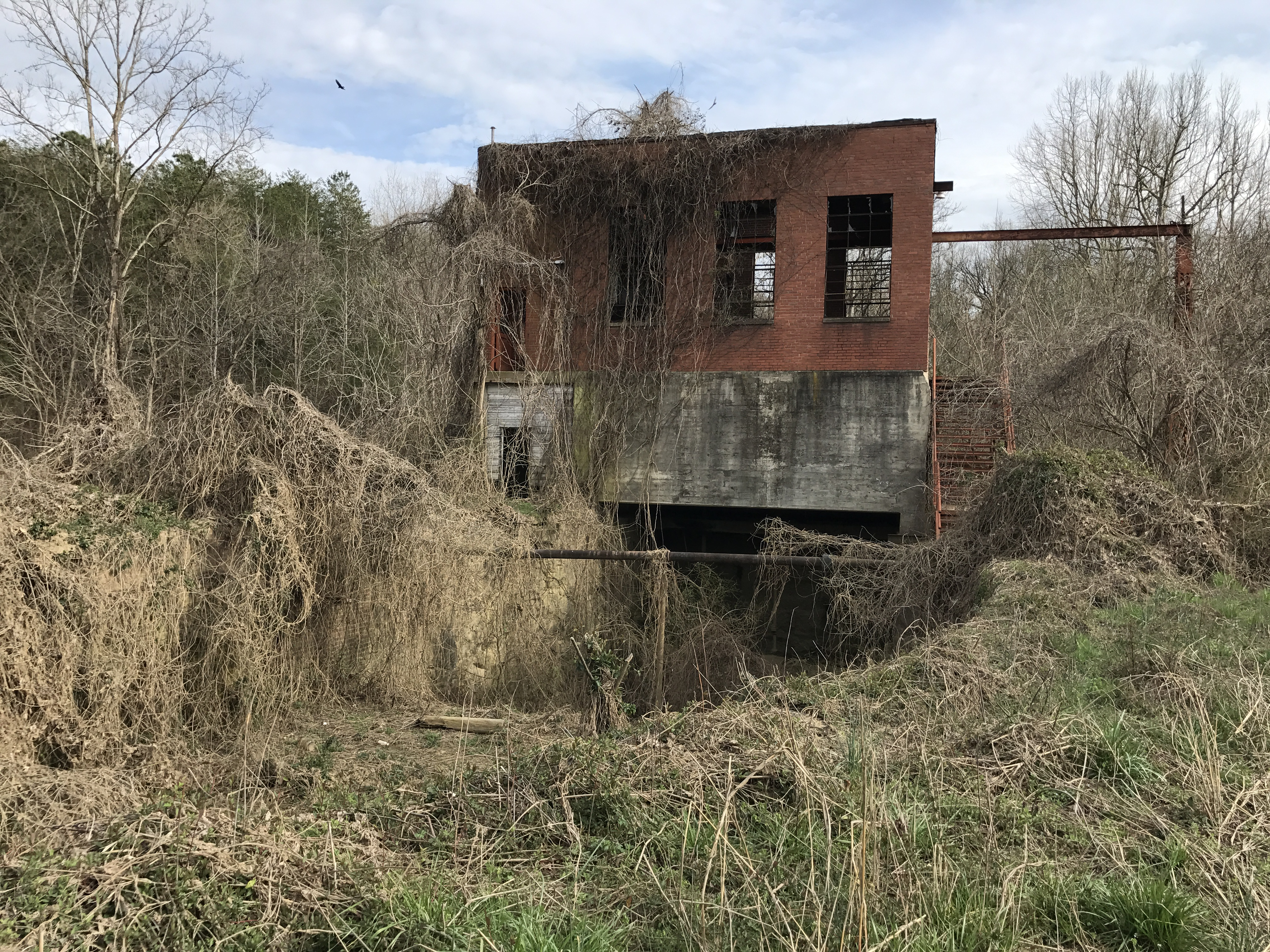
- Mill powerhouse in 2019

- Location within North Carolina Location within the United States
- Location: Main St., Ramseur, North Carolina
- Coordinates: 35°43′48″N 79°39′16″W
- Area: 22.6 acres (9.1 ha)
- Built: circa 1850-1920
- NRHP reference No.: 78001970
- Added to NRHP: November 15, 1978

Deep River-Columbia Manufacturing Company was a historic textile mill complex located at Ramseur, Randolph County, North Carolina. The brick mill complex was built between about 1850 and 1920. The main mill building consisted of a two-story, 11-bay, gable-roofed section built about 1850, with a three-story, 13-bay addition constructed in 1888. A four-story stair tower was added to the mill between 1885 and 1888. The mill closed in January 1963. It has been demolished.

It was added to the National Register of Historic Places in 1978.
