= Providence Grove High School =

American public school in North Carolina

Location
- 5555 Mack Lineberry Rd; Climax, North Carolina 27233; United States; 35°51′00″N 79°42′51″W

Information
- Type: Public
- Established: 2008 (18 years ago)
- School district: Randolph County School System
- CEEB code: 340799
- Principal: Denis Hamilton
- Teaching staff: 35.70 (FTE)
- Grades: 9–12
- Enrollment: 587 (2024–2025)
- Student to teacher ratio: 16.44
- Colors: Red, white, navy
- Team name: Patriots
- Website: pghs.randolph.k12.nc.us

Providence Grove High School (often abbreviated as PGHS) is a high school located in Climax, North Carolina, United States. It is part of the Randolph County School System.
