= Yolanda Hill Robinson =

Second Lady of North Carolina from 2021 to 2025

Second Lady of North Carolina
- In role January 9, 2021 – January 1, 2025
- Lieutenant Governor: Mark Robinson
- Preceded by: Alice Forest
- Succeeded by: Olav Nielender (as Second Gentleman)

Personal details
- Born: Yolanda Dechelle Hill; 1968 (age 57–58) Ramseur, North Carolina, U.S.
- Party: Republican
- Spouse: Mark Robinson (m. 1990)
- Children: 2
- Education: University of North Carolina at Greensboro (BS, MS)
- Occupation: Accountant; Non-profit executive

Yolanda Dechelle Hill Robinson (born 1968) is an American accountant and non-profit executive. As the wife of Former Lieutenant Governor Mark Robinson, she served as the Second Lady of North Carolina from 2021 to 2025 and was the first African-American woman to serve as the state's second lady. Robinson's time in public life has been marked by controversy. An investigation by WBTV revealed that her husband did not disclose her role as a board member of American Leadership Academy North Carolina and two of its affiliated charter schools in a 2023 ethics filing. In 2024, the North Carolina Department of Health and Human Services announced that she owed the state $132,000 for disallowed expenses following a compliance review of her non-profit organization, Balanced Nutrition, Inc.

== Early life and education ==
Robinson was born Yolanda Dechelle Hill in Ramseur, North Carolina. She grew up in Randolph County and graduated from Eastern Randolph High School in 1986. She earned a bachelor's degree and a master's degree in accounting from the University of North Carolina at Greensboro.

== Career and public life ==
In 1990, Robinson co-managed a childcare facility with her husband. She later founded Balanced Nutrition, Inc., a non-profit organization that provides healthy meals for children enrolled in licensed daycare facilities in North Carolina, which she owns and operates.

She is a board member of Revolution Academy, a K-8 charter school in Oak Ridge, North Carolina. She also sits on the board of American Leadership Academy North Carolina and two of its affiliated charter schools, American Leadership Academy in Garner and American Leadership Academy in Monroe. She joined the American Leadership Academy boards in the spring of 2022.

=== Second Lady of North Carolina ===
In 2020, Robinson's husband was elected as the first African-American Lieutenant Governor of North Carolina. When he assumed office in 2021, she became the state's first African-American Second Lady.

In May 2021, Robinson spoke at an event hosted by the Wayne County Republican Women. On July 11, 2021, Robinson and her husband attended a patriotic worship service called "God and Country Day" at the Lake Church in White Lake, North Carolina.

Robinson received a resolution of appreciation from the Davidson County Republican Party Executive Committee for being a "positive role model for young ladies" while attending a Republican event in the county with her husband in 2023.

In 2023, Robinson's husband announced his candidacy for Governor of North Carolina. Had he won the election, Robinson and her husband would have become North Carolina's first African-American governor and first lady.

==== Controversies ====
In 2022, a news story was published revealing that Robinson, who expresses anti-abortion political views, obtained an abortion in 1989. The abortion was paid for by her future husband, Mark Robinson, while they were dating. The Robinsons stated that the decision to have an abortion "has been with us ever since" and is the reason they now have a staunch anti-abortion stance. In 2022, she and her husband appeared in a video to address the abortion after it had been reported on in the news. The video was posted to her husband's official Facebook page. She did not speak in the video, but sat next to her husband while he spoke about the abortion. The Robinsons were criticized by members of the North Carolina Democratic Party and by reproductive rights activists for supporting bans on abortions after obtaining one themselves.

The North Carolina Board of Education voted twice not to approve the charter of the American Leadership Academy in Monroe, of which Robinson is a board member. Following an investigation by WBTV, it was revealed that Lieutenant Governor Robinson did not disclose his wife's role, as required by law, in his 2023 ethics filing despite recusing himself from voting in the North Carolina General Assembly's proposed legislation to implement a new Charter School Review Board on which he would sit. Robinson's husband, as Lieutenant Governor, was presiding over the North Carolina State Senate when the proposal passed, and was appointed to the review board.

===== Financial controversies =====
In 2024, North Carolina state regulators declared that Robinson's non-profit company, Balanced Nutrition, Inc., owed the state money for disallowed expenses while carrying out the Child and Adult Care Food Program, a federally funded childcare meal program. The North Carolina Department of Health and Human Services revealed that Robinson owed $132,000 following a compliance review of her non-profit and sent a notice for "serious deficiency" to the company. Robinson had previously taken out two Paycheck Protection Program loans, in 2020 and in 2021, for a total of $57,000 that were eventually forgiven. She gave herself a $28,000 raise in 2020 when Balanced Nutrition's revenue rose from $950,000 to $1.3 million. In her tax filings for Balanced Nutrition in 2021 and 2022, Robinson failed to list the salaries of their top employees, including herself and failed to acknowledge that family members were key company employees, as is required by federal guidelines. Robinson announced she would be closing her non-profit.

== Personal life ==
She married Mark Keith Robinson on May 5, 1990, in a private ceremony. They have one daughter and one son. The couple lives in Colfax, a suburb of High Point.

In September 2003, Robinson was sued by the Tarheel Triad Girl Scouts of the USA in Guilford County Small Claims Court over money owed after she gave them a bad check for $2,956.03. The magistrate ruled in favor of the Girl Scouts and ordered Robinson to pay $3,486.03 to cover fees and damages.

Robinson and her husband filed for bankruptcy on three separate occasions. They lost a home to foreclosure and lost their daycare business. In 2012, they were evicted from a rental home after failing to pay $2,000 in rent.

Honorary titles
Preceded by Alice Forest	Second Lady of North Carolina; 2021–2025	Succeeded by Olav Nielender
