= Hulond Humphries =

American educator (born 1937)

Hulond Humphries (born May 1937) is a part-time hog farmer and former principal at Randolph County High School who caused a national controversy in 1994 and 1995 after he threatened to cancel the high school's prom due to fears about interracial dating. In 1997, he again drew national attention after he was elected superintendent of the Randolph County School District.

== Personal life ==
Born May 1937, Humphries has two children.

== Interracial dating ban ==
Humphries became principal of Randolph County High School in 1969. Randolph County High School is located in Wedowee, Alabama and, in 1994, had a student body that was roughly 62 percent white and 38 percent black. In 1974, the Randolph County Board of Education was sued by the parents of two children who Humphries allegedly expelled from school without due process.

In 1989, the Randolph County School District was investigated by the US Department of Education's Office for Civil Rights based on allegations that Humphries disciplined black students more harshly than similarly situated white students and required segregation of buses from the high school to the vocational school. OCR found against the District and required it to institute a very specific disciplinary code.

In 1994, Humphries began asking his students whether they planned to attend the prom "with somebody who is not of the same race". When several students answered yes, Humphries threatened to cancel the event, saying "How would that look at a prom, a bunch of mixed couples?". Humphries reportedly claimed that he was concerned that interracial dating would lead to violence. The junior class president, ReVonda Bowen, who has a black mother and a white father, reportedly asked Humphries what his order would require her to do. Humphries replied that ReVonda's parents had "made a mistake" by conceiving her. Humphries had long opposed interracial dating, as had some of his teachers; Humphries reportedly threatened to tell students' parents that they were dating interracially, as well as telling white girls that "no white boy would have them" after they had been with a black boy.

Following the incident, parents across the district organized demonstrations and boycotted classes. About one fifth of the school's students did not attend classes for several days. Two local "Freedom Schools", held in African-American church buildings, were organized by local civil rights groups as a temporary alternative. Eventually, Humphries was placed on paid leave by the local school board; he was also sued by the Southern Poverty Law Center on behalf of Bowen's parents. The Southern Christian Leadership Conference scheduled a demonstration in Wedowee, but this was canceled after Ku Klux Klan members from Georgia said that they would travel to Wedowee to stage a counterdemonstration. Threats were made against Bowen's family, and her home was guarded by FBI agents.

Some white parents in the district, however, approved of Humphries' views; as a result, he was reinstated as principal two weeks after the incident. Humphries rescheduled the prom, which did occur. Bowen showed up with her white boyfriend, Chris Brown. Most of the African-American students still refused to attend, however, and held their own prom at the local elementary school. Incidentally, the elementary school was the school where the African-American students attended in Wedowee for years until Randolph County High School was integrated in the late 1960s. Nine years later, Bowen would write a book about her experiences, No Mistakes, No More Tears.

Due to an arson fire which destroyed the school building in August 1994, Humphries was reassigned to the school district's central office. Humphries was one of the first to show up at the scene of the fire, and he reportedly shouted racial epithets at Bill Gill, a black cameraman who was filming the scene. Gill was beaten, but Humphries denied participating in his assault. Some black residents began staying indoors at night for fear of Ku Klux Klan retaliation, due to the fact that many white residents believed that blacks were responsible for the fire. A rally in support of Humphries was organized by the late white nationalist activist Richard Barrett and his Nationalist Movement.

A year after the incident, the local school district reached an agreement which barred Humphries from all school grounds in the district during class hours; the ban was to have been effective until July 1997. The agreement also promoted racial equality in general, and then-Assistant Attorney General Deval Patrick said that it removed "existing barriers to equality of educational opportunity". Some parents in the district felt that the agreement did not go far enough in punishing Humphries, however.

== Later career ==
In July 1997, Humphries was elected as superintendent of the Randolph County school district, narrowly winning the Democratic primary and running unopposed in the general election.

The Randolph High School football stadium is named for Humphries.

== See also ==
- 2009 Louisiana interracial marriage incident
- Constance McMillen
- Anti-miscegenation laws
