= Trinity, North Carolina =

- City
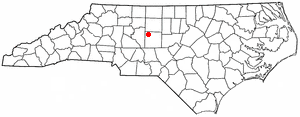
- Location of Trinity, North Carolina
- Coordinates: 35°52′32″N 80°00′34″W
- Country: United States
- State: North Carolina
- County: Randolph
- Incorporated: 1869
- Named for: Trinity College

Government
  - Mayor: Richard McNabb

Area
  - Total: 17.05 sq mi (44.17 km^{2})
  - Land: 16.88 sq mi (43.73 km^{2})
  - Water: 0.17 sq mi (0.44 km^{2})
- Elevation: 709 ft (216 m)

Population (2020)
  - Total: 7,006
  - Density: 415/sq mi (160.2/km^{2})
- Time zone: UTC-5 (Eastern (EST))
  - Summer (DST): UTC-4 (EDT)
- ZIP code: 27370
- Area code: 336
- FIPS code: 37-68400
- GNIS feature ID: 2405605
- Website: www.trinity-nc.gov

Trinity is a city in Randolph County, North Carolina, United States. The population was 7,006 at the 2020 census. Trinity is part of the Greensboro-High Point Metropolitan Statistical Area of the Piedmont Triad metro region.

== History ==
The community was named after Trinity College, which later became Duke University. Trinity College started as Brown's Schoolhouse, a private subscription school founded in 1838. The school was organized by a group of Methodists and Quakers, and was officially started by Hezekiah Leigh, who was also a founder of Randolph-Macon College. In 1841 North Carolina issued a charter for Union Institute Academy. The school took the name Trinity College in 1859, and in 1892, the college moved to Durham.

Sealy Corporation, the world's largest manufacturer of bedding products with sales of $1.2 billion in 2003, is headquartered in Trinity.

== Notable people ==
Former baseball player Gil English died in Trinity, North Carolina. Trinity is also home to NASCAR Cup Series drivers Bobby Labonte, Brian Vickers and Kyle Petty, and current NASCAR Craftsman Truck Series driver Thad Moffitt.

The former "World's Longest Hot Wheels Track" was built at the Kyle Petty Farm in Trinity on May 9, 1999.

== Geography ==
According to the 2020 United States census the city has a land area of 16.88 square miles (43.7 km^{2}) and a population density of 415.1 residents per square mile.

== Demographics ==
Historical population
Census	Pop.	Note	%±
1880	240		—
1890	380		58.3%
1900	274		−27.9%
1910	332		21.2%
1920	400		20.5%
1930	554		38.5%
1980	6,878		—
1990	5,469		−20.5%
2000	6,690		22.3%
2010	6,614		−1.1%
2020	7,006		5.9%
U.S. Decennial Census

=== 2020 census ===
Trinity racial composition
Race	Number	Percentage
White (non-Hispanic)	5,880	83.93%
Black or African American (non-Hispanic)	335	4.78%
Native American	39	0.56%
Asian	173	2.47%
Other/Mixed	249	3.55%
Hispanic or Latino	330	4.71%

As of the 2020 census, Trinity had a population of 7,006. The median age was 47.2 years. 19.3% of residents were under the age of 18 and 22.2% of residents were 65 years of age or older. For every 100 females there were 96.0 males, and for every 100 females age 18 and over there were 95.4 males age 18 and over.

68.1% of residents lived in urban areas, while 31.9% lived in rural areas.

There were 2,856 households in Trinity, of which 27.7% had children under the age of 18 living in them. Of all households, 54.7% were married-couple households, 17.2% were households with a male householder and no spouse or partner present, and 22.9% were households with a female householder and no spouse or partner present. About 24.4% of all households were made up of individuals and 12.3% had someone living alone who was 65 years of age or older.

There were 3,032 housing units, of which 5.8% were vacant. The homeowner vacancy rate was 2.2% and the rental vacancy rate was 3.1%.

=== 2000 census ===
As of the census of 2000, there were 6,690 people, 2,638 households, and 2,057 families residing in the city. The population density was 395.9 inhabitants per square mile (152.9/km^{2}). There were 2,759 housing units at an average density of 163.3 per square mile (63.1/km^{2}). The racial composition of the city was: 93.05% White, 5.04% Black or African American, 0.91% Hispanic or Latino American, 0.54% Asian American, 0.63% Native American, 0.01% Native Hawaiian or Other Pacific Islander, 0.33% some other race, and 0.40% two or more races.

There were 2,638 households, out of which 30.5% had children under the age of 18 living with them, 63.3% were married couples living together, 10.4% had a female householder with no husband present, and 22.0% were non-families. 18.3% of all households were made up of individuals, and 6.7% had someone living alone who was 65 years of age or older. The average household size was 2.54 and the average family size was 2.86. Trinity has a low rate of studio and one bedroom rentals compared to many cities; it also has a low rate of people living alone.

In the city, the population was spread out, with 22.5% under the age of 18, 6.9% from 18 to 24, 29.1% from 25 to 44, 29.7% from 45 to 64, and 11.8% who were 65 years of age or older. The median age was 40 years. For every 100 females, there were 97.7 males. For every 100 females age 18 and over, there were 94.8 males.

The median income for a household in the city was $43,277, and the median income for a family was $48,838. Males had a median income of $35,498 versus $22,208 for females. The per capita income for the city was $21,068. About 6.1% of families and 8.6% of the population were below the poverty line, including 12.0% of those under age 18 and 12.0% of those age 65 or over.

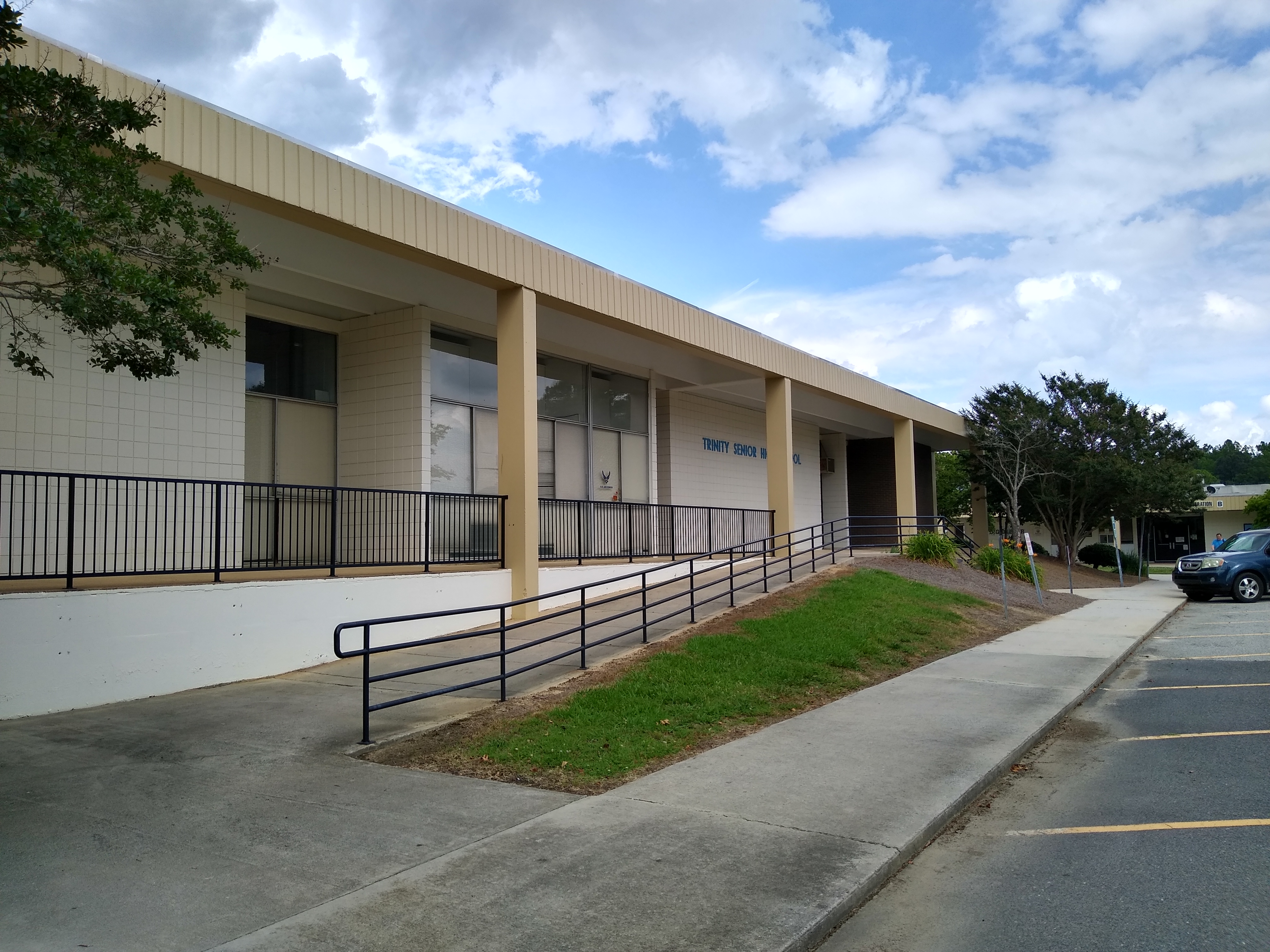
Trinity High School

== Education ==
Randolph County School System operates public schools including Trinity High School and Wheatmore High School.

== See also ==
- List of municipalities in North Carolina
