= Randleman High School =

American public school in North Carolina

Location
- 4396 Tiger's Den Road; Randleman, North Carolina 27317; United States; 35°49′36″N 79°49′15″W

Information
- School type: Public
- Opened: 1974 (52 years ago)
- School district: Randolph County Schools
- CEEB code: 343250
- Principal: Corey Phillips
- Teaching staff: 50.47 (FTE)
- Grades: 9–12
- Enrollment: 872 (2023–2024)
- Student to teacher ratio: 17.28
- Language: English
- Colors: Orange, Blue
- Athletics conference: 4-A; PAC Seven 4A/5A
- Team name: Tigers
- Website: rhs.randolph.k12.nc.us

Randleman High School is a public high school in Randleman, North Carolina It is a part of the Randolph County Schools system.

== Overview ==
Randleman High School is a high school in the Randolph County School District. The current campus was opened in 1974. In April 2024, the school board approved to build a new building for the school.

== Administration ==
- Principal – Corey Phillips
- Assistant principals – Jessi Green, Jonathan Lanier

== Athletics ==
Randleman's mascot is the Tiger. They play in the NCHSAA's PAC Seven 4A/5A Conference.

- Baseball
- Basketball
- Cross Country
- Football
- Golf
- Soccer
- Swimming
- Tennis
- Track and field
- Volleyball
- Wrestling

=== Sporting achievements ===
The Tigers' football team won 3 consecutive state 2A championships from 1981 to 1983. The 1983 team, led by All-State running back Tony Goss, finished in USA TODAY's final Top 25 poll.

Under head coach Jake Smith, the Tigers won the NCHSAA 2A state title in baseball in 2011, 2021, and 2022. They were also the 2A state runner-up in 2019.

Year	NCHSAA State Championships
1981	2A Football
1982	2A Football
1983	2A Football
2011	2A Baseball
2021	2A Baseball
2022	2A Baseball

== Notable alumni ==
- Nathan Buttke, stock car racing driver
- Antonio Goss, American football coach and former NFL linebacker
- Dale Inman, former NASCAR crew chief
- Dallas McPherson, former MLB third baseman
- Kyle Petty, former NASCAR driver and current racing commentator
- Maurice Petty, former NASCAR crew chief and engine builder for Petty Enterprises
- Richard Petty, former seven-time NASCAR Cup Series champion, total of 200 Cup Series wins
