= Alvin Wright =

American football player (1961–2018)

No. 99
- Positions: Defensive tackle, defensive end

Personal information
- Born: February 5, 1961; Wedowee, Alabama, U.S.
- Died: March 23, 2018 (aged 57)
- Listed height: 6 ft 2 in (1.88 m)
- Listed weight: 274 lb (124 kg)

Career information
- High school: Randolph Co. (Wedowee, Alabama)
- College: Jacksonville State
- NFL draft: 1986: undrafted

Career history
- Los Angeles Rams (1986–1991); Cleveland Browns (1992); Los Angeles Raiders (1992)

Career NFL statistics
- Sacks: 8
- Fumble recoveries: 1
- Stats at Pro Football Reference

Alvin Wright (February 5, 1961 – March 23, 2018) was an American professional football defensive lineman. Wright, a nose tackle, played with the National Football League (NFL)'s Los Angeles Rams from 1986 to 1991 and was All-Pro in 1990.

== Early life and college ==
Wright graduated from Randolph County High School in 1980 after leading the football team to the state playoff finals in 1979 and earned a football scholarship with Jacksonville State University in Alabama. Wright was Gulf South Conference Freshman of the Year in 1980 and Defensive Player of the Year in 1981. He earned Honorable Mention All-America honors after the 1981 season. Wright lettered four years at Jacksonville State and had 200 career solo tackles, 388 total tackles, and 30 quarterback sacks. Wright led the Gamecocks to two Gulf South conference championships and three trips to the NCAA Division II playoffs.

== Professional career ==
After college, Wright was drafted in the 14th round by the Birmingham Stallions of the USFL. Rather than report to the Stallions, Wright went undrafted by the NFL and later signed as an undrafted free agent with the Rams in 1985. He briefly left the Rams' camp, but returned in 1986 and spent most of that season on the injured list with a knee injury. Wright was the first Rams player to cross the picket line during the 1987 NFL players' strike and started his first career game against the New Orleans Saints in Week 3. He played 84 career games over seven seasons, starting 62, and recording 163 career solo tackles, 71 assists, and eight quarterback sacks. Wright led all Rams defensive linemen in tackles for four consecutive seasons and started 50 consecutive games from 1988 to 1991.

== Personal life ==
Wright had a wife named Sherri Wright (Baldy) and has two children, Brittany Shantelle Wright and Eric Pool (Wright).

Alvin Wright died of a heart attack on March 23, 2018.
