= Southwestern Randolph High School =

American public school in North Carolina

Location
- 1641 Hopewell Friends Rd; Asheboro, North Carolina 27205; United States; 35°37′29″N 79°52′11″W

Information
- Established: 1970 (56 years ago)
- School district: Randolph County School System
- CEEB code: 340110
- Principal: Brian Hodgin
- Staff: 46.15(FTE)
- Grades: 9–12
- Enrollment: 801 (2020-21)
- Student to teacher ratio: 17.36
- Colors: Royal blue, Gold
- Mascot: Cougar
- Yearbook: Infinity
- Website: swrhs.randolph.k12.nc.us

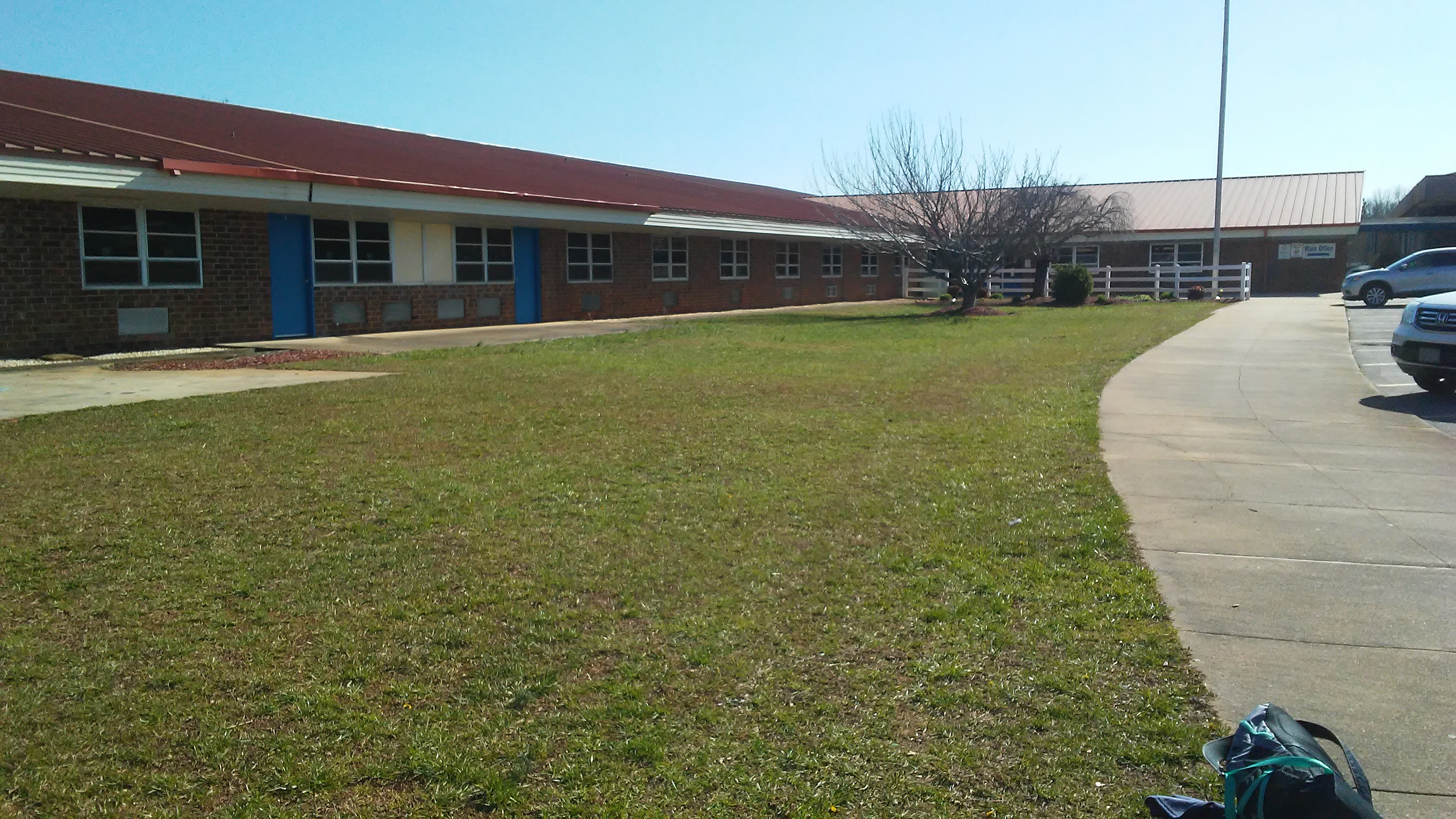

Southwestern Randolph High School is a public high school in an unincorporated area in Randolph County, North Carolina. It is a part of the Randolph County Schools.

== Overview ==
Southwestern Randolph is a rural, public, consolidated high school serving grades 9–12. The school is one of seven public high schools located in Randolph County, North Carolina. The school opened in 1970. The student body consists of approximately 854 students as of the 2019-2020 school year.

The school's colors are royal blue and gold. The mascot is the Cougar. The school yearbook is Infinity. The campus includes a Cultural Arts Building named after G. C. Castelloe, Jr. a Gymnasium named after John (Jack) S. Castelloe, and a Stadium named after Ivey B. Luck.

271 students are free lunch eligible, 24 are Reduced-price lunch eligible, and 177 are directly certified.

== Principals ==
- G. C. Castelloe, Jr. (1970–1985)
- Donnie Baxter (1985–1996)
- Jerry Tillman (1996)
- Wayne Thrift (1996–2001)
- Drew Maerz (2001–2003)
- Greg Batten (2003–2004)
- Chris Vecchione (2004–2010)
- Brian Toth (2010–2012)
- Shon Hildreth (2012–2018)
- Brian Hodgin (2019-2025)
- Jonathan Lanier (2025-)
