= Randolph County School District (Alabama) =

School district in Alabama

Address
- 182 Circle Drive Wedowee, Alabama, 36278; United States

District information
- Type: Public
- Grades: PreK–12
- NCES District ID: 0102820

Students and staff
- Students: 2,029
- Teachers: 130.43
- Staff: 148.0
- Student–teacher ratio: 15.56

Other information
- Website: www.randolphboe.org

Randolph County School District the a school district on Randolph County, Alabama, headquartered in Wedowee.

== Schools ==
K-12 schools:

- Wadley High School

7-12 schools:

- Woodland High School

Senior high schools:

- Randolph County High School

K-8 schools:

- Rock Mills Jr. High School

Middle schools:

- Wedowee Middle School

Elementary schools:

- Wedowee Elementary School
- Woodland Elementary School

Other:

- Randolph-Roanoke Career Technology Center
