= Ramseur, North Carolina =

- Town
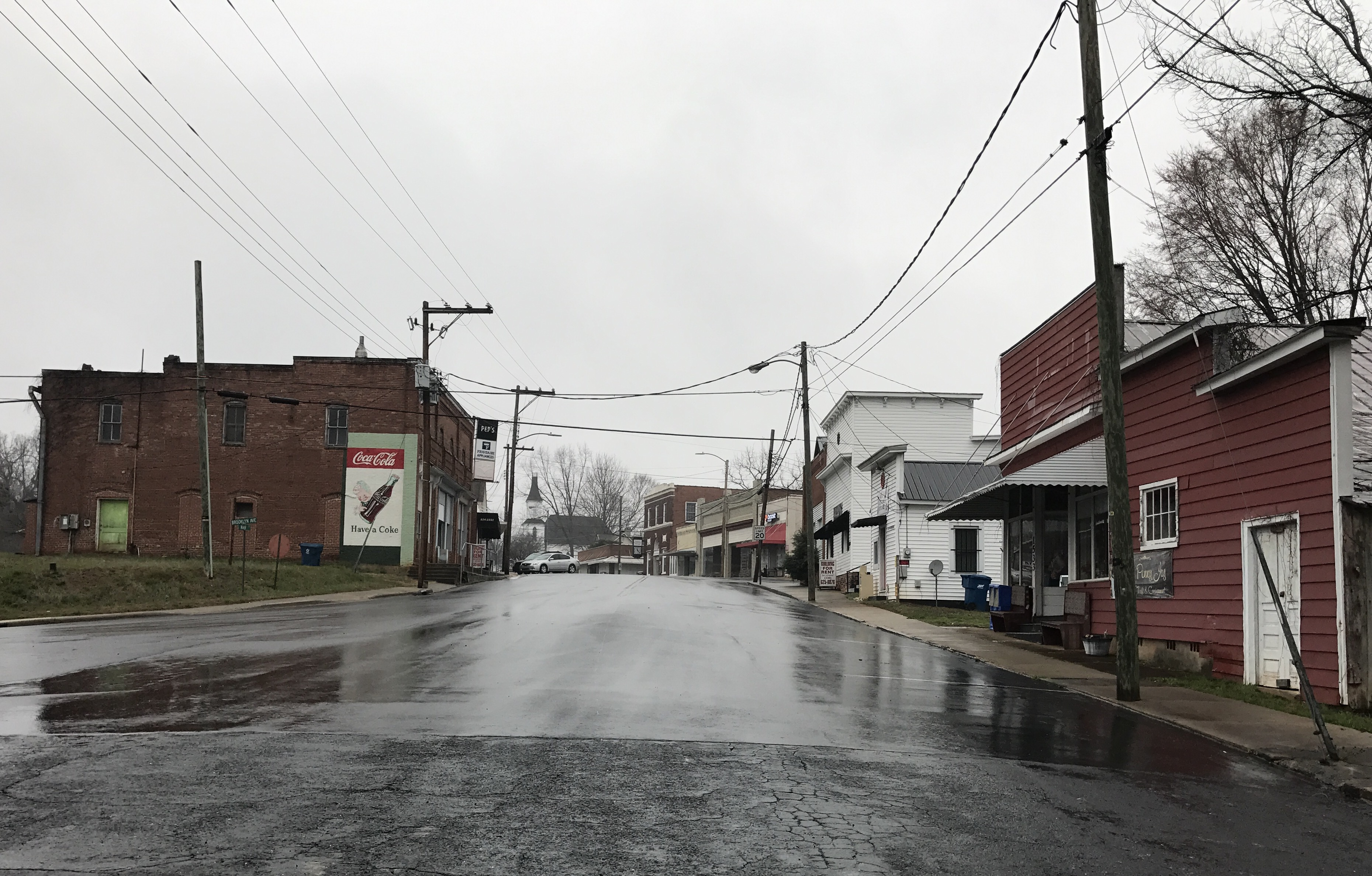
- Main Street in Ramseur

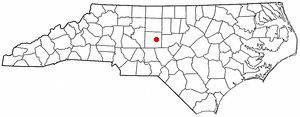
- Location of Ramseur, North Carolina
- Coordinates: 35°44′15″N 79°39′16″W
- Country: United States
- State: North Carolina
- County: Randolph
- Incorporated: 1895
- Named for: Stephen D. Ramseur

Area
  - Total: 2.24 sq mi (5.81 km^{2})
  - Land: 2.00 sq mi (5.18 km^{2})
  - Water: 0.25 sq mi (0.64 km^{2})
- Elevation: 538 ft (164 m)

Population (2020)
  - Total: 1,774
  - Density: 887.2/sq mi (342.55/km^{2})
- Time zone: UTC-5 (Eastern (EST))
  - Summer (DST): UTC-4 (EDT)
- ZIP code: 27316
- Area code: 336
- FIPS code: 37-55040
- GNIS feature ID: 2407172
- Website: www.townoframseur.org

Ramseur is a town in Randolph County, North Carolina, United States. As of the 2020 census, Ramseur had a population of 1,774.

== Geography ==
According to the United States Census Bureau, the town has a total area of 1.7 square miles (4.3 km^{2}), of which 1.6 square miles (4.2 km^{2}) is land and 0.04 square mile (0.1 km^{2}) (1.80%) is water.

== Demographics ==
Historical population
Census	Pop.	Note	%±
1900	769		—
1910	1,022		32.9%
1920	1,014		−0.8%
1930	1,220		20.3%
1940	1,220		0.0%
1950	1,134		−7.0%
1960	1,258		10.9%
1970	1,328		5.6%
1980	1,162		−12.5%
1990	1,186		2.1%
2000	1,588		33.9%
2010	1,692		6.5%
2020	1,774		4.8%
U.S. Decennial Census

=== 2020 census ===
Ramseur racial composition
Race	Number	Percentage
White (non-Hispanic)	1,094	61.67%
Black or African American (non-Hispanic)	233	13.13%
Native American	10	0.56%
Asian	32	1.8%
Other/Mixed	108	6.09%
Hispanic or Latino	297	16.74%

As of the 2020 United States census, there were 1,774 people, 638 households, and 415 families residing in the town.

=== 2000 census ===
At the 2000 census there were 1,588 people, 652 households, and 444 families in the town. The population density was 968.0 inhabitants per square mile (373.7/km^{2}). There were 697 housing units at an average density of 424.9 per square mile (164.1/km^{2}). The racial makeup of the town was 80.67% White, 10.96% African American, 0.25% Native American, 0.69% Asian, 5.04% from other races, and 2.39% from two or more races. Hispanic or Latino of any race were 8.25%.

Of the 652 households 32.1% had children under the age of 18 living with them, 47.7% were married couples living together, 16.6% had a female householder with no husband present, and 31.9% were non-families. 29.0% of households were one person and 16.1% were one person aged 65 or older. The average household size was 2.42 and the average family size was 2.95.

The age distribution was 26.3% under the age of 18, 7.9% from 18 to 24, 27.0% from 25 to 44, 21.1% from 45 to 64, and 17.8% 65 or older. The median age was 36 years. For every 100 females, there were 85.9 males. For every 100 females age 18 and over, there were 78.6 males.

The median household income was $32,961 and the median family income was $42,153. Males had a median income of $28,500 versus $20,848 for females. The per capita income for the town was $15,411. About 10.2% of families and 14.8% of the population were below the poverty line, including 19.2% of those under age 18 and 22.1% of those age 65 or over.

== History ==
Ramseur was named for Stephen Dodson Ramseur, a Confederate major general of the Civil War.

The Deep River-Columbia Manufacturing Company was listed on the National Register of Historic Places in 1978.

== Education ==
Eastern Randolph High School, a public high school that is under the jurisdiction of the Randolph County School System, is located in Ramseur.

== In film ==
Portions of the 1968 film Killers Three were shot in the Ramseur and Coleridge areas, and many locals were cast as extras.

== Notable people ==
- Heidi N Closet, drag queen and Miss Congeniality on season 12 of RuPaul's Drag Race
- B. Everett Jordan, United States Senator from 1959 to 1973
- Yolanda Hill Robinson, Second Lady of North Carolina
