= Eastern Randolph High School =

Public high school in Randolph County, North Carolina

Location
- 390 Eastern Randolph Road; Ramseur, North Carolina 27316; United States; 35.7552°N 79.6177°W

Information
- Type: Public
- Established: 1968
- School district: Randolph County School System
- Principal: Christopher Campbell
- Teaching staff: 37.17 (FTE)
- Grades: 9–12
- Enrollment: 627 (2023–2024)
- Student to teacher ratio: 16.87
- Campus: Rural
- Nickname: Wildcats
- Website: erhs.randolph.k12.nc.us

Eastern Randolph High School is a public high school in Ramseur, North Carolina, that is part of the Randolph County School System.

== History ==
Eastern Randolph High School was founded in 1968. It is one of eight high schools in the Randolph County school system.

In 2024, Eastern Randolph High School was ranked between 451th and 576th in North Carolina and between 13,242th and 17,655th in national school rankings.

In May 2024, health officials confirmed a case of tuberculosis at the school.

In August 2024, the North Carolina Department of Public Safety State Highway Patrol reported that two students at the school were killed, and another two were injured, in a car crash.

== Demographics ==
The total minority enrollment at the school in 2024 was fifty percent, with sixty-six percent of students listed as economically disadvantaged.

== Notable alumni ==
- Sandy Waugh Bradshaw, flight attendant on United Airlines Flight 93 who was killed during the September 11 attacks
- Bradley Cain, professional wrestler, better known under his ring name "Lodi"
- Andy Headen, former NFL linebacker, Super Bowl XXI champion with the New York Giants
- Yolanda Hill Robinson, former Second Lady of North Carolina
