= Trinity High School (Trinity, North Carolina) =

American public school in North Carolina

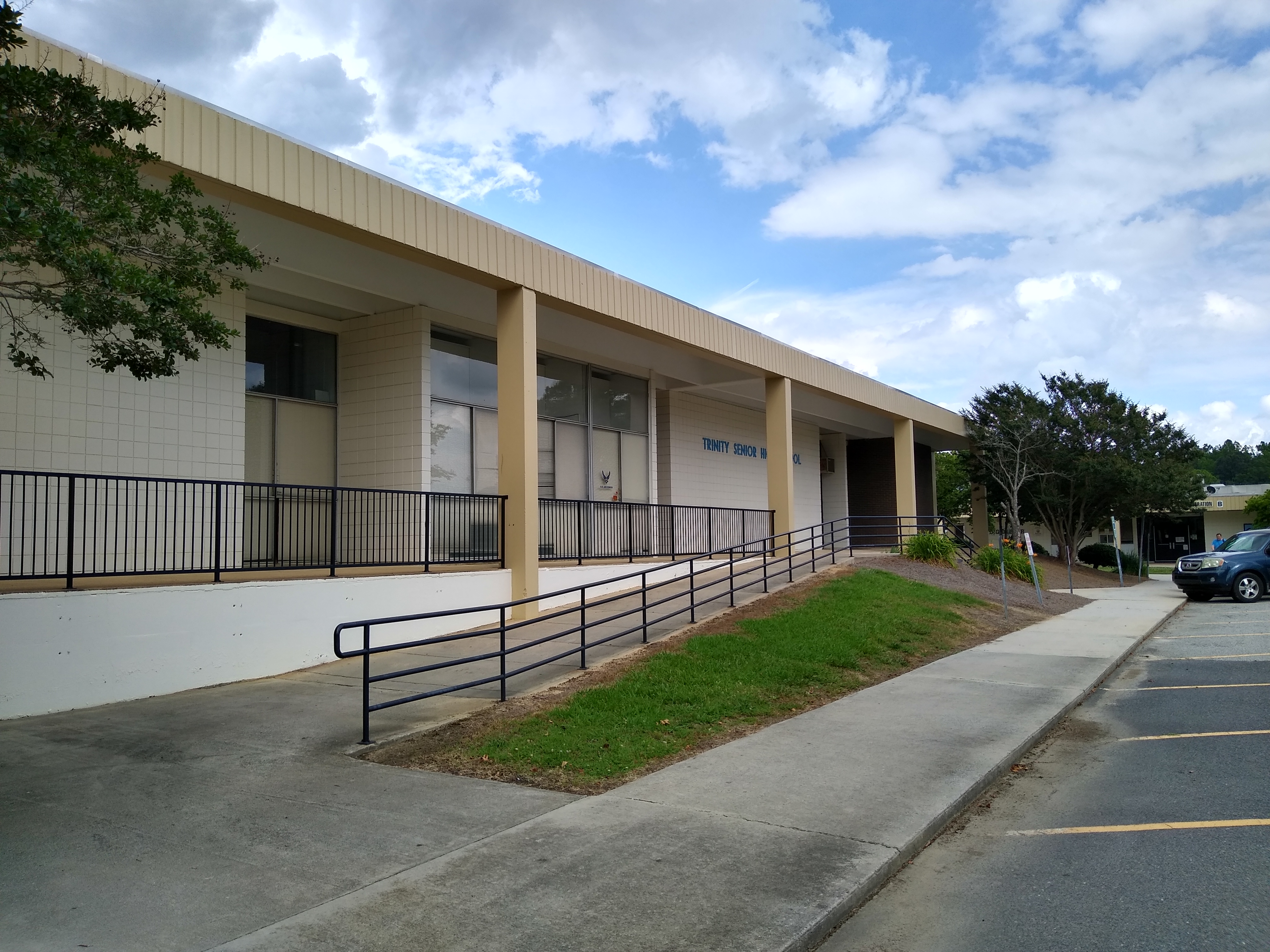

Location
- 5746 Trinity High Drive; Trinity, North Carolina 27370; United States; 35°53′39″N 79°59′49″W

Information
- Type: Public
- Motto: "Tradition, Honor, Success"
- Established: 1925 (101 years ago)
- School district: Randolph County Schools
- CEEB code: 344005
- NCES School ID: 370378001534
- Principal: Brian Toth
- Teaching staff: 40.00 (on FTE basis)
- Grades: 9–12
- Enrollment: 695 (2023-2024)
- Student to teacher ratio: 17.38
- Colors: Columbia blue and black
- Athletics conference: PAC 6
- Mascot: Bulldog
- Nickname: Bulldogs
- Website: ths.randolph.k12.nc.us

Trinity High School is a public high school located in Trinity, North Carolina. The school serves about 870 students in grades 9 to 12 in the Randolph County Schools district.

== Notable alumni ==
- Bobby Labonte, stock car racing driver and NASCAR Hall of Fame inductee
- Adam Petty, stock car racing driver
- Brian Vickers, stock car racing driver
