= Randolph County School System (North Carolina) =

School district in North Carolina, US

Coordinates: 35.6759°N 79.8236°W

The Randolph County School System (RCSS) is a school district headquartered in Asheboro, North Carolina, United States. It serves Randolph County, except for a central portion of the county, which is served by Asheboro City Schools. That district includes the vast majority of Asheboro and some unincorporated areas.

== History ==
In 2013 the district board voted 5-2 to ban Invisible Man from the school libraries. Gary Mason, a board member, said that he "didn’t find any literary value." The board vote occurred after a parent of an 11th grade student at Randleman High School complained about the book. After immediate outrage from residents and negative national coverage, the board voted 6-1 to reverse the decision within two weeks.

== Schools ==
- Farmer Elementary School
- Hopewell Elementary School
- Trindale Elementary School
- Archdale Elementary School
- Level Cross Elementary School
- Grays Chapel Elementary School
- Liberty Elementary School
- Randleman Elementary School
- Lawrence Elementary School
- New Market Elementary School
- Tabernacle Elementary School
- Southmont Elementary School
- Seagrove Elementary School
- Coleridge Elementary School
- Franklinville Elementary School
- Ramseur Elementary School
- Braxton Craven Middle School
- Randleman Middle School
- Northeastern Randolph Middle School
- Southeastern Randolph Middle School
- Southwestern Randolph Middle School
- Trinity High School
- Wheatmore High School
- Southwestern Randolph High School
- Eastern Randolph High School
- Providence Grove High School
- Randleman High School
